= Zeiss (company) =

German optics company

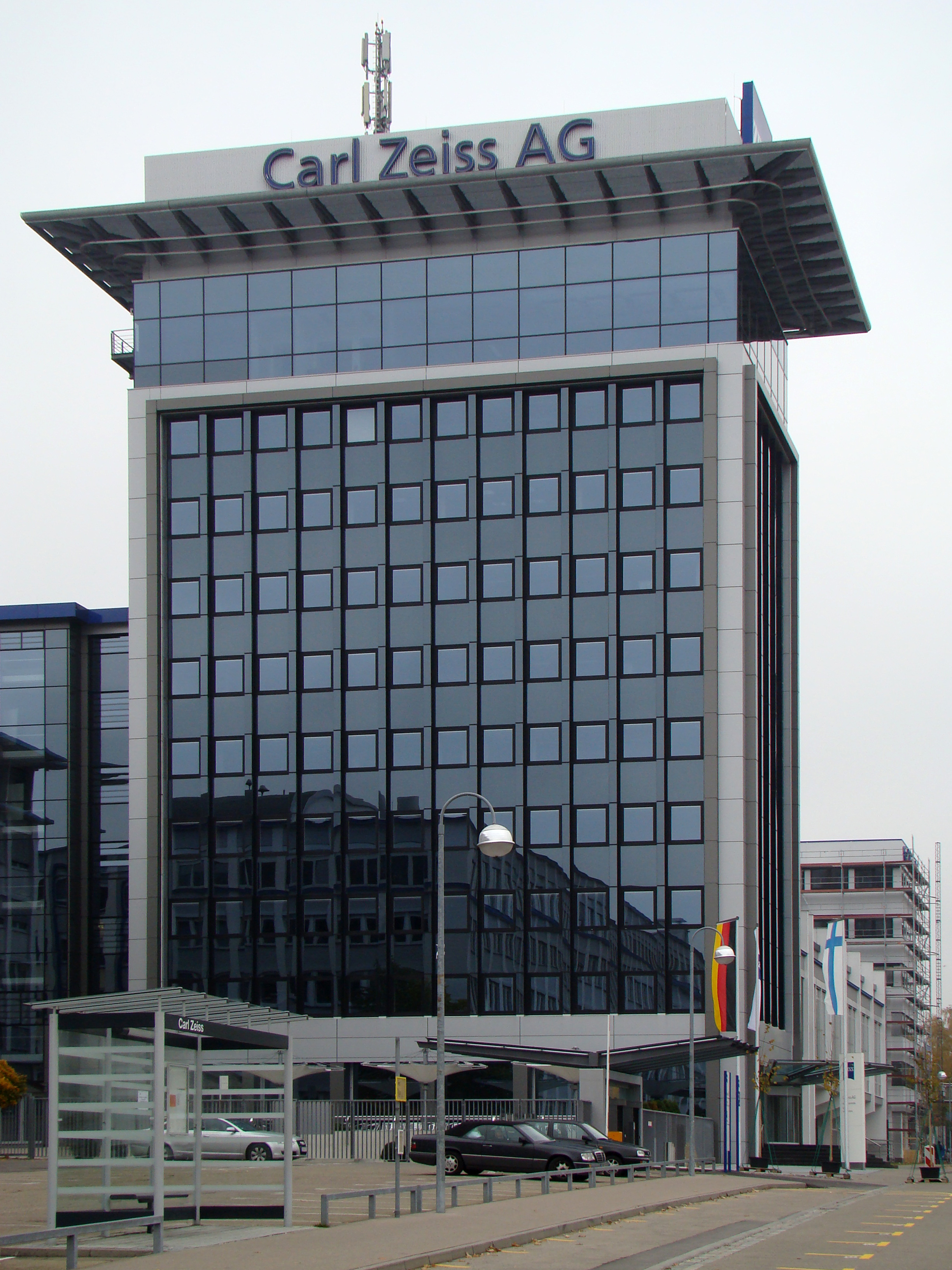
- Headquarters in Oberkochen
- Formerly: Carl Zeiss
- Type: Private
- Industry: Imaging
- Founded: 1846; 180 years ago in Jena, Saxe-Weimar-Eisenach, German Confederation
- Founder: Carl Zeiss
- Headquarters: Oberkochen, Baden-Württemberg, Germany
- Key people: Andreas Pecher, CEO and President
- Products: Semiconductor lithography equipment, light, electron and ion microscopes, coordinate-measuring machines, medical devices, eyeglasses, binoculars, spotting scopes, telescopes, planetarium projectors, and other optical equipment.
- Revenue: ▲€11,896 million (2025)
- Operating income: ▲€1,814 million (2025)
- Net income: ▲€952 million (2025)
- Total assets: ▲€18,329 million (2025)
- Total equity: ▲€8,780 million (2025)
- Owner: Carl-Zeiss-Stiftung
- Number of employees: ▲46,622 (2025)
- Website: www.zeiss.com

Zeiss (/zaɪs/ ZYSSE; German: [kaʁl ˈtsaɪs]) is a German manufacturer of optical systems and optoelectronics, founded in Jena, Germany, in 1846 by optician Carl Zeiss. Together with Ernst Abbe (joined 1866) and Otto Schott (joined 1884) he laid the foundation for today's multinational company. The current company emerged from a reunification of Carl Zeiss companies in East and West Germany with a consolidation phase in the 1990s. Zeiss is active in four business segments with approximately equal revenue (Industrial Quality and Research, Medical Technology, Consumer Markets and Semiconductor Manufacturing Technology) in almost 50 countries, has 30 production sites and around 25 development sites worldwide.

Carl Zeiss AG is the holding company for all subsidiaries within the Zeiss Group, of which Carl Zeiss Meditec AG is the only one that is traded on the stock market. Carl Zeiss AG is owned by the Carl-Zeiss-Stiftung foundation. The Zeiss Group has its headquarters in southern Germany, in the small town of Oberkochen, with its second largest, and founding site, being Jena in eastern Germany. Also controlled by the Carl-Zeiss-Stiftung is the glass manufacturer Schott AG, located in Mainz and Jena. Carl Zeiss is one of the oldest optics manufacturers in the world.

== Corporate history ==
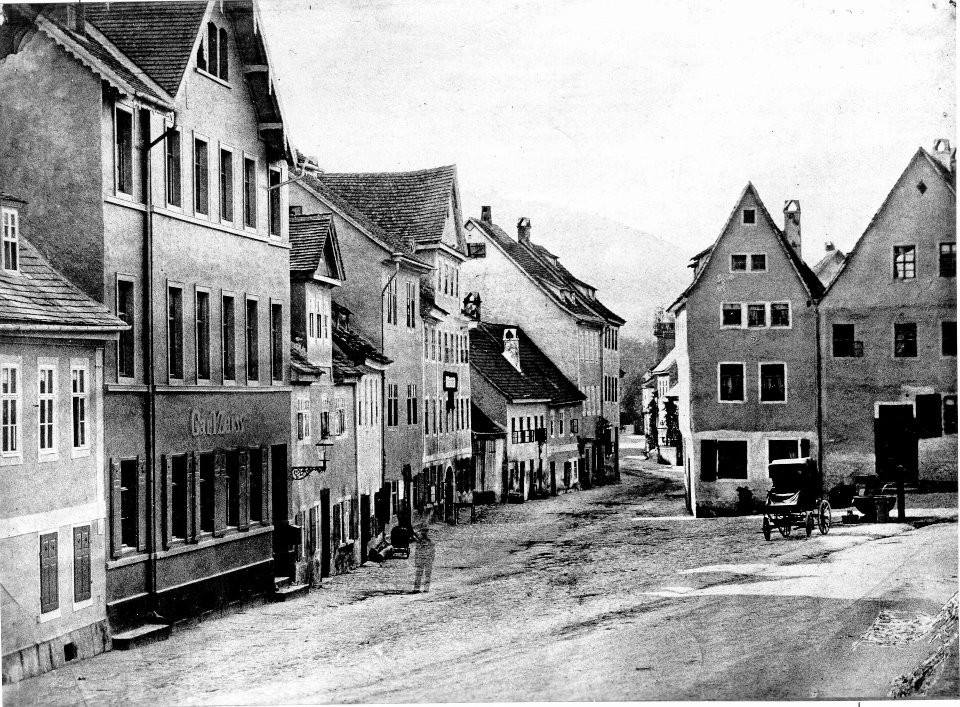
First workshop of Carl Zeiss in the center of Jena (c. 1847)

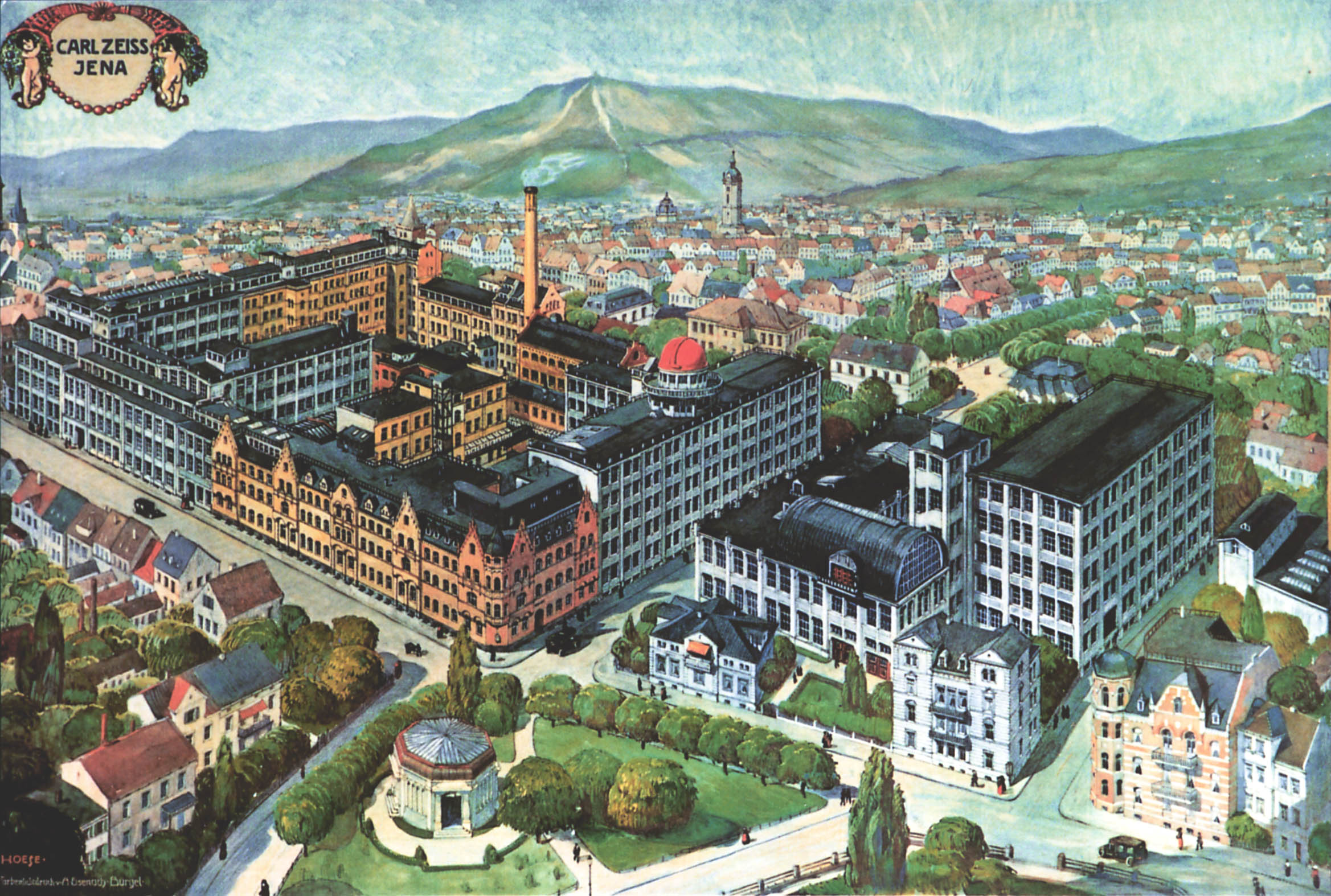
Carl Zeiss Jena (1910)

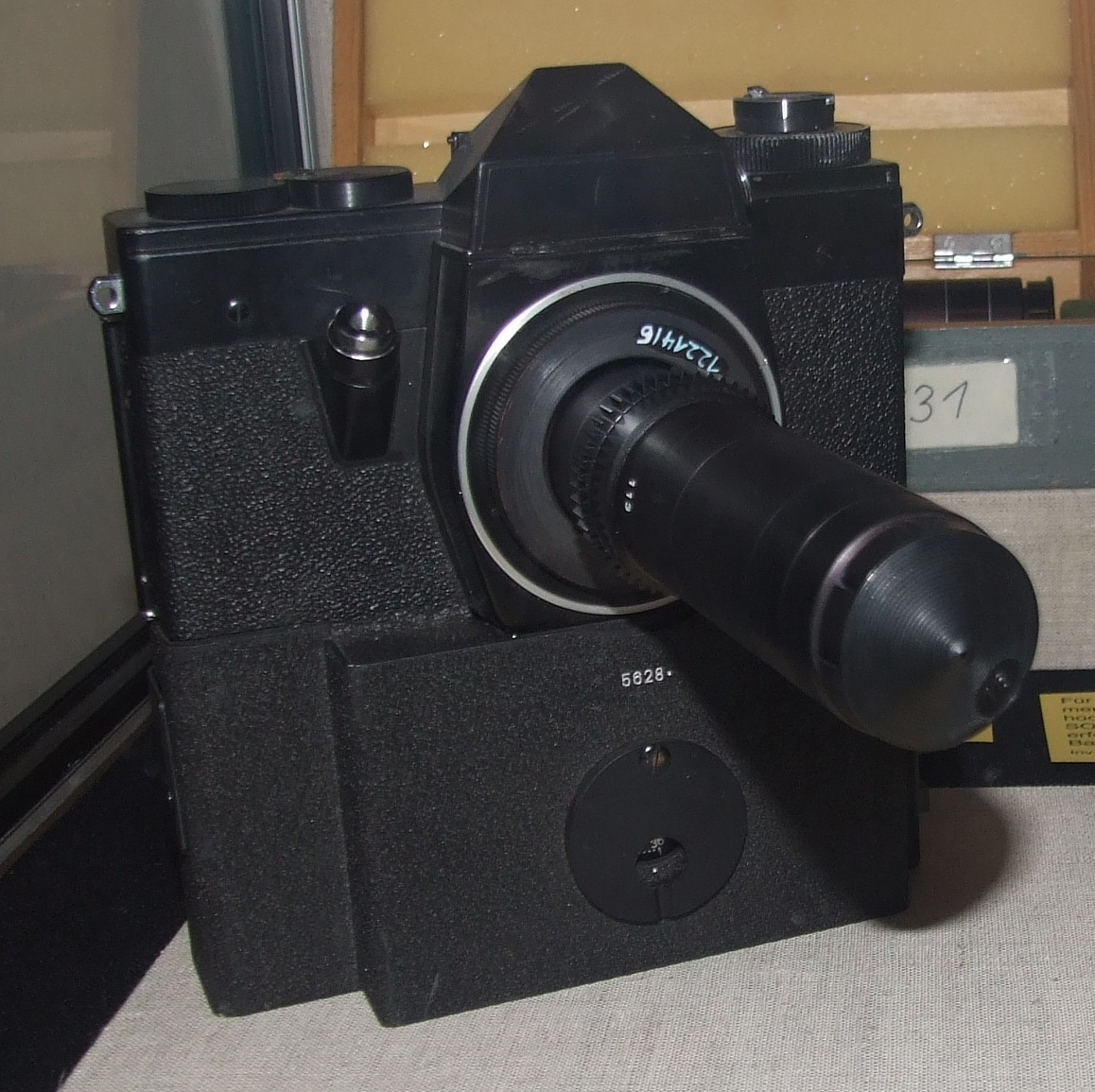
One of the Stasi's cameras with the special SO-3.5.1 (5/17mm) lens developed by Carl Zeiss, a so-called "needle eye lens", for shooting through keyholes or holes down to 1 mm in diameter

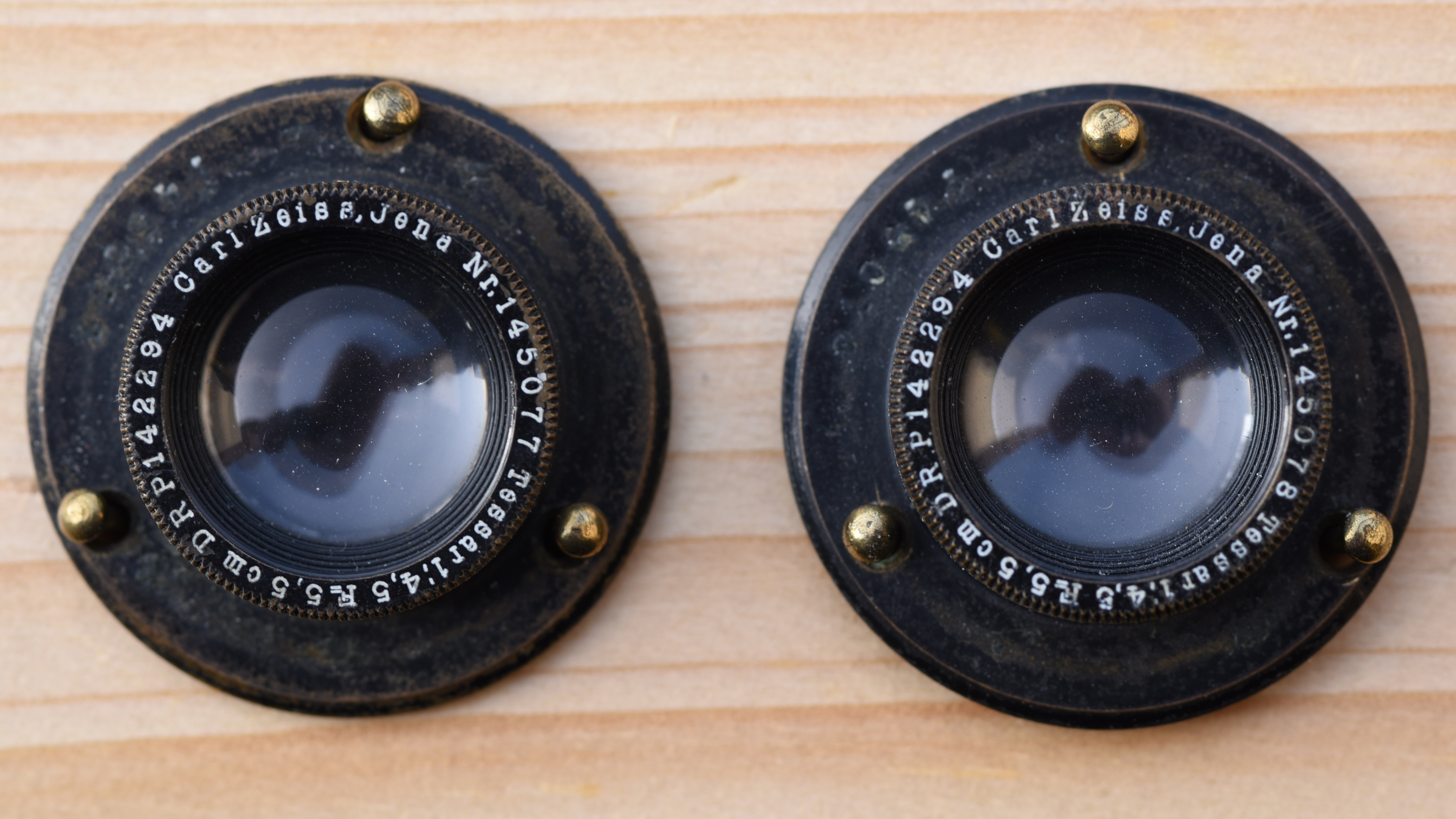
2 historical lenses of Carl Zeiss, Nr. 145077 and Nr. 145078, Tessar 1:4,5 F=5,5cm DRP 142294 (produced before 1910)

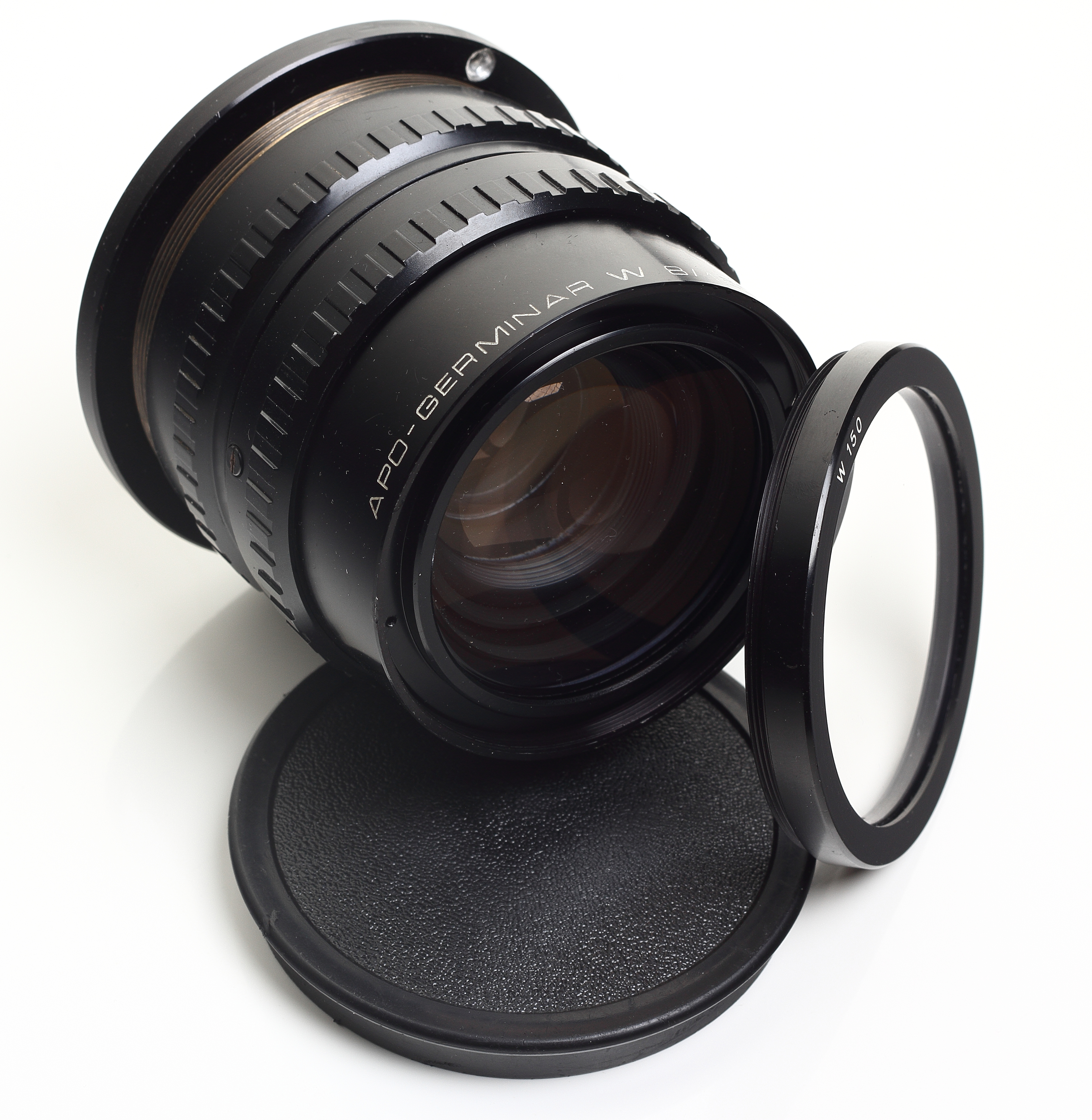
Carl Zeiss APO-Germinar W B/150

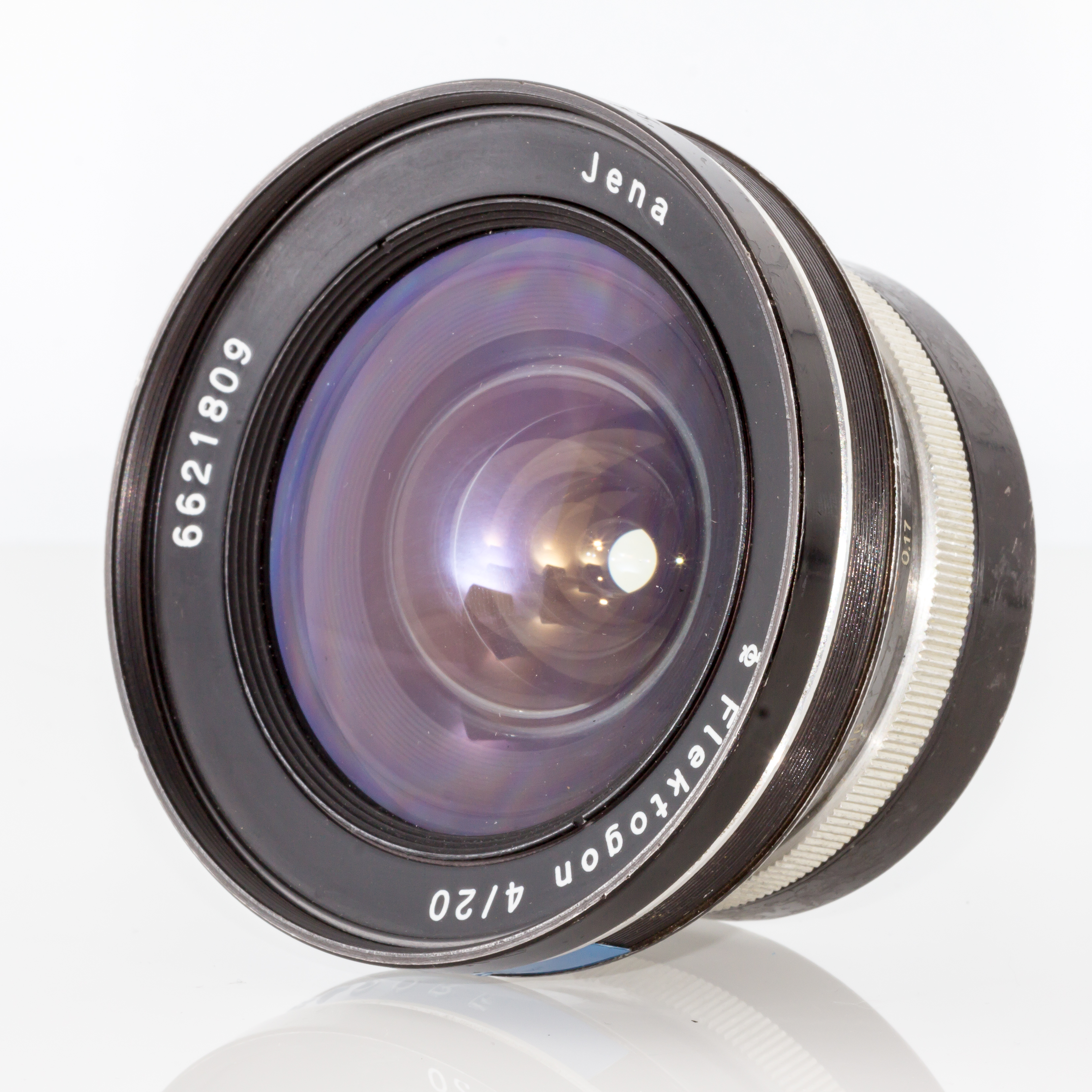
VEB Zeiss Jena Flektogon lens engraved with "Jena" to be exported to West Germany (1967)

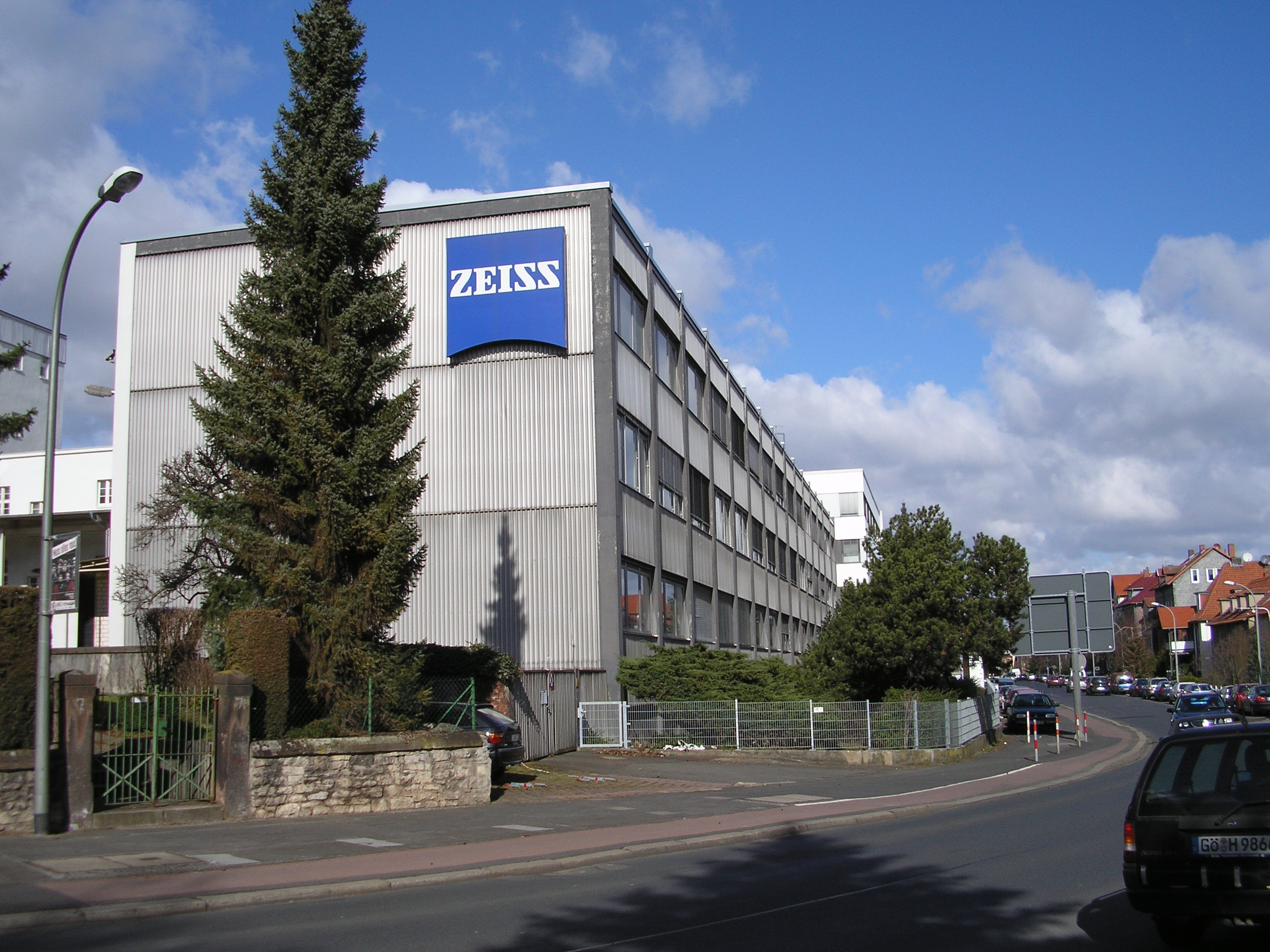
Office of Zeiss in Göttingen

Carl Zeiss opened an optics workshop in Jena in 19 November 1846. By 1847, he was making microscopes full-time. In 1861, the rapidly growing company had a staff of about 20 and won a gold medal at the Thuringian Industrial Exposition. By 1866 Zeiss sold their 1,000th microscope. In 1872 physicist Ernst Abbe joined Zeiss, and along with Otto Schott designed greatly improved lenses for the optical instruments they were producing. After Carl Zeiss's death in 1888, the business was incorporated as the Carl-Zeiss-Stiftung in 1889.

By World War I, Zeiss was the world's largest producer of cameras. Zeiss Ikon represented a significant part of the production, along with dozens of other brands and factories, including a major works at Dresden.

In 1928 the Zeiss company took a majority stake of Hensoldt AG and fully acquired around the year 1964 and 1968, which has produced Zeiss binoculars and rifle-scopes since 1964 this has occasionally resulted in twin products being offered under both the "Hensoldt" and "Zeiss" brand-names. The Hensoldt System Technology division (resulting from a merger of the military-optics operations of Leica and Hensoldt) was continued by Zeiss under the "Hensoldt" name until 2006.

As part of Nazi Germany's Zwangsarbeiter program, Zeiss used forced labour, including Jews and other minorities during World War II. The destruction of the war caused many companies to divide into smaller subcompanies and others to merge. There was great respect for the engineering innovation that came out of Dresden—before the war the world's first 35 mm single-lens reflex camera, the Kine Exakta, and the first miniature camera with good picture-quality were developed there.

At the end of the war, Jena was initially occupied by the United States Army. When Jena and Dresden were incorporated into the Soviet occupation zone, later East Germany, the US Army relocated some parts of Zeiss Jena to the Contessa manufacturing facility in Stuttgart, West Germany, while the remainder of Zeiss Jena was reestablished by the (eastern) German Democratic Republic as Kombinat VEB Zeiss Jena. The Soviet Army relocated most of the existing Zeiss factories and tooling to the Soviet Union, establishing the Kiev camera-works.

In the West, business activity restarted in Oberkochen in present-day Baden-Württemberg (southwestern Germany) as Opton Optische Werke Oberkochen GmbH in 1946, which became Zeiss-Opton Optische Werke Oberkochen GmbH in 1947, but was soon renamed to "Carl Zeiss". West-German Zeiss products were labelled "Opton" for sale in the Eastern bloc, while East German Zeiss products were labelled "Zeiss Jena" or simply "Jena" for sale in Western countries.

In 1973, Carl Zeiss AG made cooperation agreement with Japanese camera manufacturer Yashica to create cameras with photographic lenses in the Contax range. In 1974, the first camera in this range, the Contax RTS, was launched. After Yashica was bought by Kyocera in 1983, this partnership continued with Kyocera until the company stopped producing cameras in 2005. Since then, Carl Zeiss AG has continued to produce high quality, photographic lenses. These include lenses for professional photography and for use in space. In addition, VEB Carl Zeiss Jena (East Germany) became very well known for producing optical instruments, photographic lenses and other precision products.

Following the German reunification of 1989–1991, VEB Zeiss Jena — reckoned as one of the few East-German firms that was even potentially able to compete on a global basis — became Zeiss Jena GmbH, which became Jenoptik Carl Zeiss Jena GmbH in 1990. In 1991, Jenoptik Carl Zeiss Jena was split in two, with Carl Zeiss AG (Oberkochen) taking over the company's divisions for microscopy and other precision optics (effectively reuniting the pre-war Carl Zeiss enterprise) and moving its microscopy and planetarium divisions back to Jena. Jenoptik GmbH was split off as a specialty company in the areas of photonics, optoelectronics, and mechatronics.

The Hensoldt AG was renamed "Carl Zeiss Sports Optics GmbH" on 1 October 2006.

The companies of the Zeiss Gruppe in and around Dresden have branched into new technologies: screens and products for the automotive industry, for example.

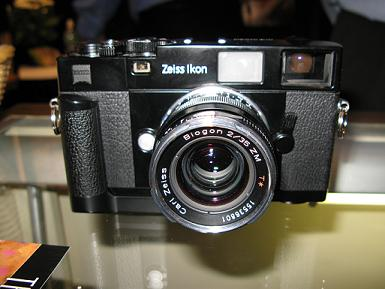
A 2004 Zeiss Ikon rangefinder with 35mm ƒ/2 Biogon lens

Zeiss Ikon has several descendant companies. In West Germany, Zeiss Ikon AG was established in Stuttgart in 1948. It became a part of Carl Zeiss, but was sold to a Finnish group in 1989. The company was renamed IKON AG in 1990. In East Germany, the Zeiss Ikon factories in Dresden were nationalised and formed into VEB Zeiss Ikon in 1948. In 1964 it became part of VEB Pentacon Dresden. Carl Zeiss AG in West Germany remained a separate company, continuing the tradition of Zeiss optics.

A division called "Carl Zeiss Vision" produces lenses for eyeglasses. In 2005, the eyeglass division merged with U.S. company SOLA, which included the former American Optical Company.

On 28 June 2013, Carl Zeiss announced its plan to rename the brand from "Carl Zeiss" to simply "Zeiss". All the products were to be standardized under the "Zeiss" brand.

In April 2019, Zeiss announced the acquisition of Brunswick-based GOM.

== Innovations ==
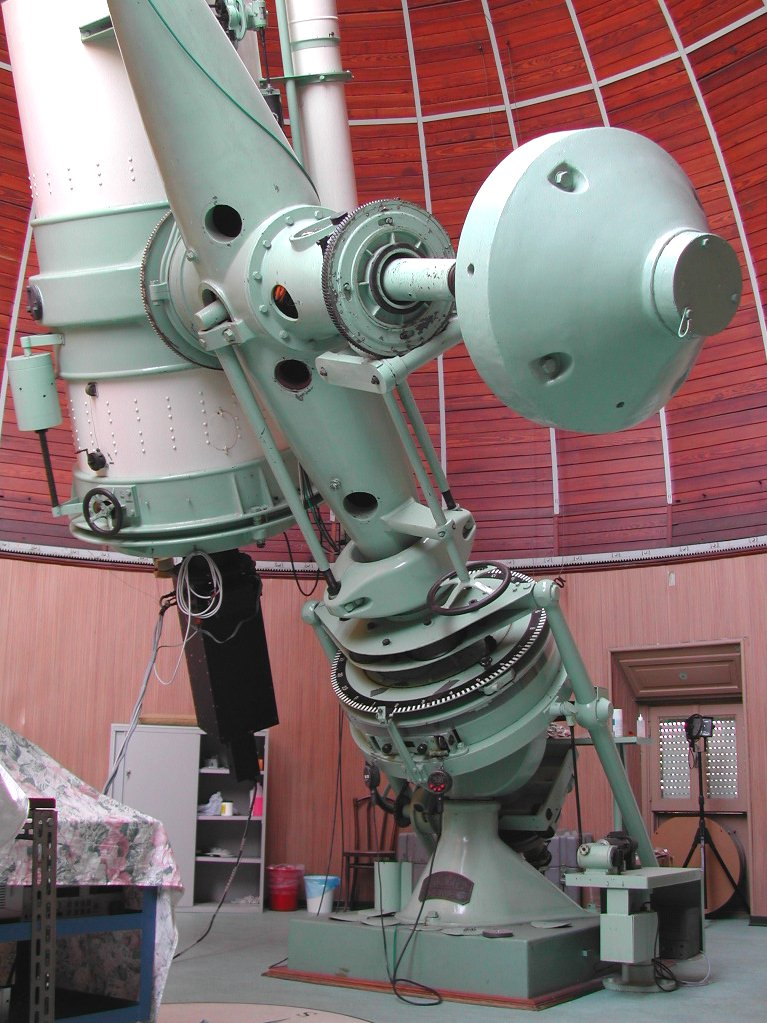
A Zeiss 100 cm aperture reflecting telescope

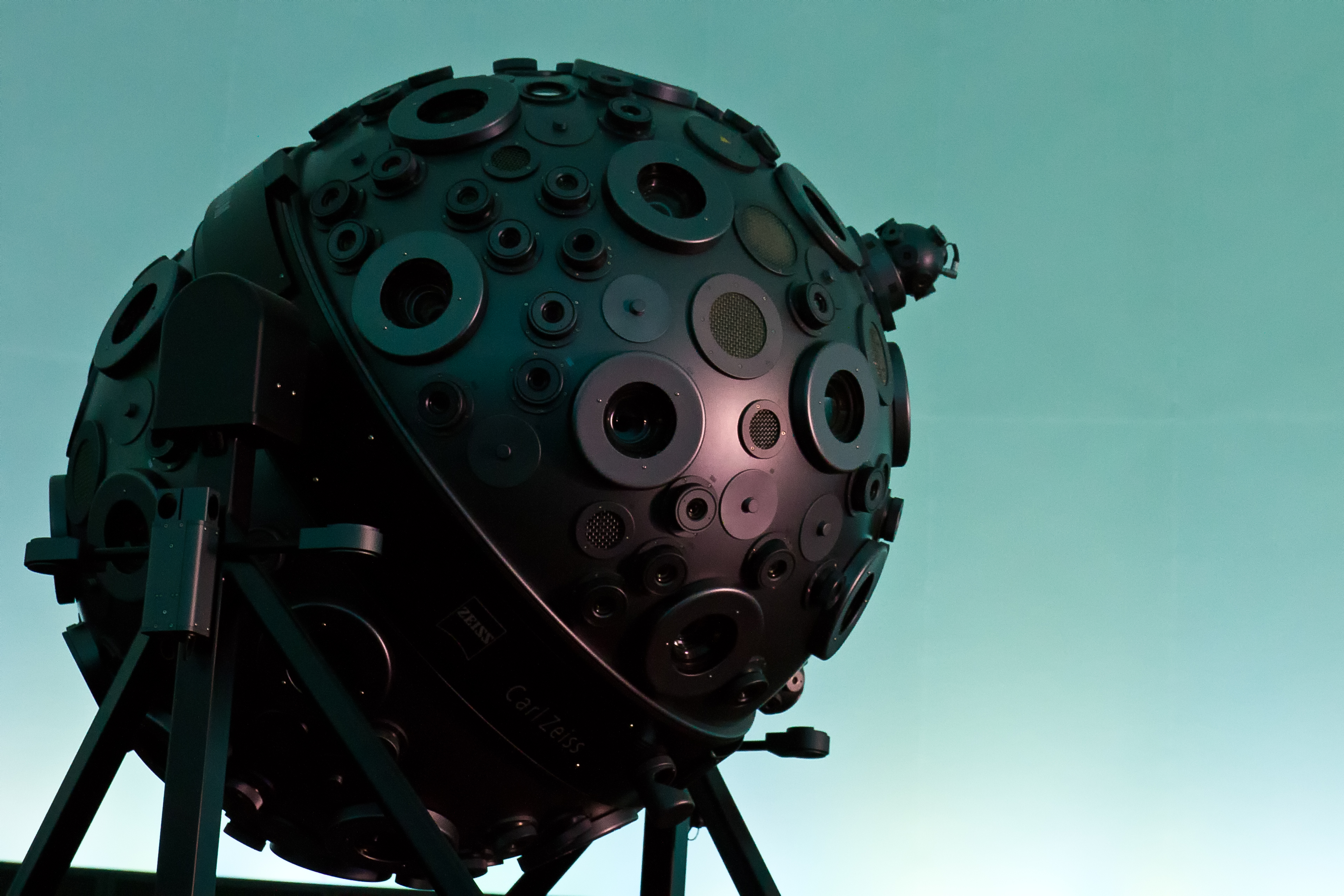
Zeiss star projector for a planetarium

The Zeiss company was responsible for many innovations in optical design and engineering in each of their major fields of business. Today this becomes exemplarily visible in the latest EUV lithography systems, the equipment needed to produce the latest generations of semiconductor components. It also includes early high-performance optical microscopes up to today's electron and ion microscopes, which reach a sub-nanometers resolution. It includes technology leadership in the first surgical microscopes and ophthalmic devices. It also includes high-performance contact metrology systems. For many years Zeiss showed innovations in fields as astronomical telescopes, photographic and cinematic lenses.

Early on, Carl Zeiss realised that he needed a competent scientist so as to take the firm beyond just being another optical workshop. In 1866, the service of Dr. Ernst Abbe was enlisted. From then on novel products appeared in rapid succession which brought the Zeiss company to the forefront of optical technology.

Abbe was instrumental in the development of the famous Jena optical glass. When he was trying to eliminate stigmatism from microscopes, he realized that the range of optical glasses available was insufficient. After some calculations, he realised that performance of optical instruments would dramatically improve if optical glasses of appropriate properties were available. His challenge to glass manufacturers was finally answered by Dr. Otto Schott, who established the famous glassworks at Jena from which new types of optical glass began to appear from 1888 to be employed by Zeiss and other makers.

The new Jena optical glass also opened up the possibility of increased performance of photographic lenses. The first use of Jena glass in a photographic lens was by Voigtländer, but as the lens was an old design its performance was not greatly improved. Subsequently, the new glasses would demonstrate their value in correcting astigmatism, and in the production of apochromatic lenses. Abbe started the design of a photographic lens of symmetrical design with five elements, but went no further.

Zeiss' domination of photographic lens innovation was due to Dr Paul Rudolph. In 1890, Rudolph designed an asymmetrical lens with a cemented group at each side of the diaphragm, appropriately named "Anastigmat". This lens was made in three series: Series III, IV and V, with maximum apertures of f/7.2, f/12.5, and f/18 respectively. In 1891, Series I, II and IIIa appeared with respective maximum apertures of f/4.5, f/6.3, and f/9 and in 1893 came Series IIa of f/8 maximum aperture. These lenses are now better known by the trademark "Protar", which was first used in 1900.

At the time, single combination lenses, which occupy one side of the diaphragm only, were still popular. Rudolph designed one with three cemented elements in 1893, with the option of fitting two of them together in a lens barrel as a compound lens, but it was found to be the same as the Dagor by C.P. Goerz, designed by Emil von Hoegh. Rudolph then came up with a single combination with four cemented elements, which can be considered as having all the elements of the Protar stuck together in one piece. Marketed in 1894, it was called the Protarlinse Series VII, the most highly corrected single combination lens with maximum apertures between f/11 and f/12.5, depending on its focal length.

But the important thing about this Protarlinse is that two of these lens units can be mounted in the same lens barrel to form a compound lens of even greater performance and a larger aperture, between f/6.3 and f/7.7. In this configuration, it was called the Double Protar Series VIIa. An immense range of focal lengths can thus be obtained by the various combination of Protarlinse units.

Rudolph also investigated the Double-Gauss concept of a symmetrical design with thin positive menisci enclosing negative elements. The result was the Planar Series Ia of 1896, with maximum apertures up to f/3.5, one of the fastest lenses of its time. Whilst it was very sharp, it suffered from coma which limited its popularity. However, further developments of this configuration made it the design of choice for high-speed lenses of standard coverage.

Probably inspired by the Stigmatic lenses designed by Hugh Aldis for Dallmeyer of London, Rudolph designed a new asymmetrical lens with four thin elements, the Unar Series Ib, with apertures up to f/4.5. Due to its high speed, it was used extensively on hand cameras.

The most important Zeiss lens by Rudolph was the Tessar, first sold in 1902 in its Series IIb f/6.3 form. It can be said as a combination of the front half of the Unar with the rear half of the Protar. This proved to be the most valuable and flexible design, with tremendous development potential. Its maximum aperture was increased to f/4.7 in 1917 and reached f/2.7 in 1930. It is probable that every lens manufacturer has produced lenses of the Tessar configurations.

Rudolph left Zeiss after World War I, but many other competent designers such as Merté, Wandersleb, etc. kept the firm at the leading edge of photographic lens innovations. One of the most significant designers was the ex-Ernemann man Dr Ludwig Bertele, famed for his Ernostar high-speed lens.

With the advent of the Contax by Zeiss-Ikon, the first professional 35mm system camera became available. At this stage the Leica was no more than a convenient and portable snapshot camera. However Leitz could see the potential offered by the Contax and rapidly developed a coupled rangefinder and started to introduce additional lenses. As a system camera there was a need for a range of lenses for the Contax. Bertele's Sonnar series of lenses designed for the Contax was the match in every respect for the Leica for at least two decades. Other lenses for the Contax included the Biotar, Biogon, Orthometar, and various Tessars and Triotars.

The last important Zeiss innovation before World War II was the technique of applying an anti-reflective coating to lens surfaces invented by Olexander Smakula in 1935. A lens so treated was marked with a red "T", short for "Transparent". The technique of applying multiple layers of coatings was developed from this basis after the war, and known as "T✻" (T-star).

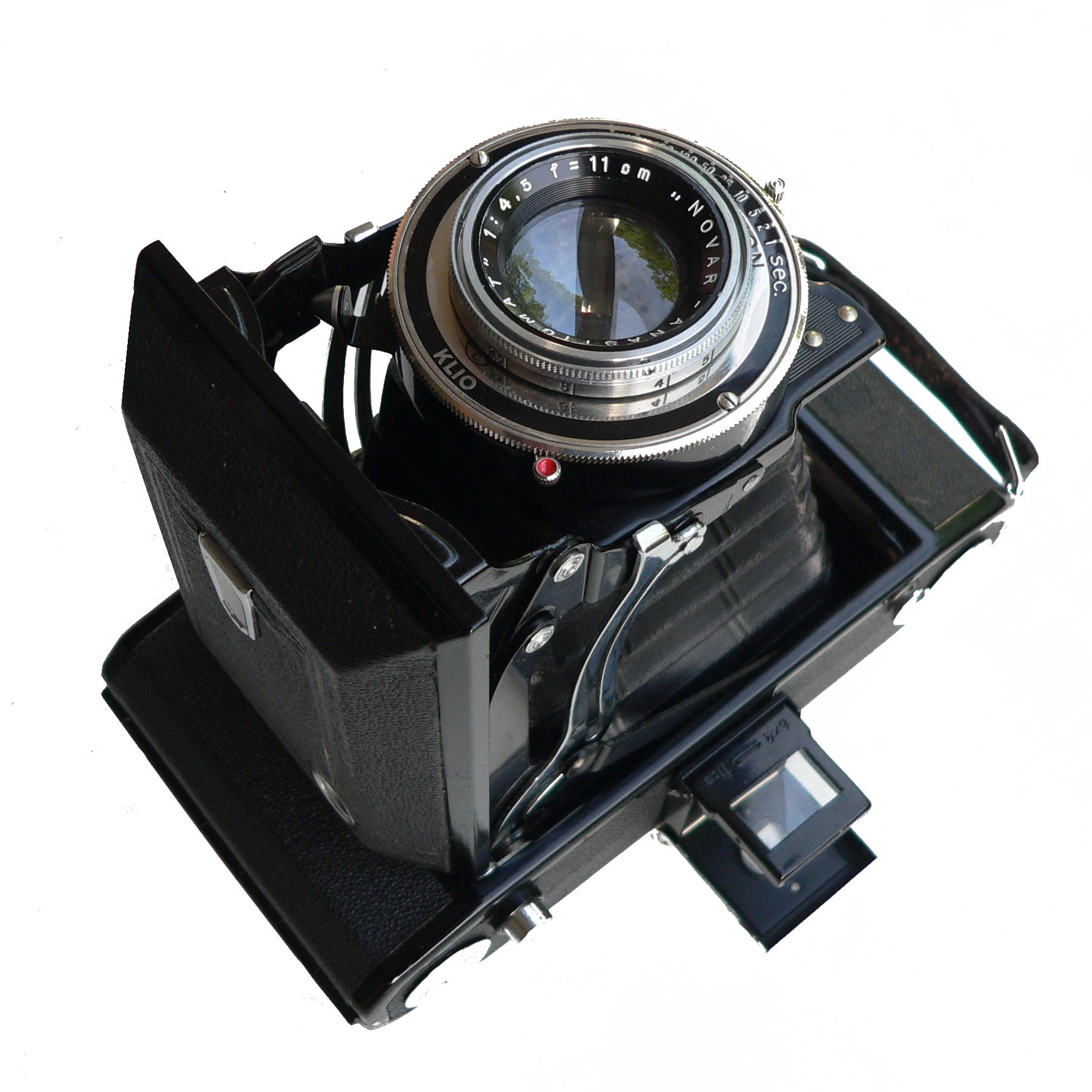
Zeiss Ikon Nettar 515 with Klio shutter and Novar-Anastigmat 11cm ƒ/4.5 lens

After the partitioning of Germany, a new Carl Zeiss optical company was established in Oberkochen, while the original Zeiss firm in Jena continued to operate. At first, both firms produced very similar lines of products, and extensively cooperated in product-sharing, but they drifted apart as time progressed. Jena's new direction was to concentrate on developing lenses for 35 mm single-lens reflex cameras, and many achievements were made, especially in ultra-wide angle designs. In addition to that, Oberkochen also worked on designing lenses for the 35 mm single-lens reflex camera Contarex, for the medium format camera Hasselblad, for large format cameras like the Linhof Technika, interchangeable front element lenses such as for the 35 mm single-lens reflex Contaflex and other types of cameras.

Since the beginning of Zeiss as a photographic lens manufacturer, it has had a licensing programme, allowing other manufacturers to produce its lenses. Over the years its licensees included Voigtländer, Bausch & Lomb, Ross, Koristka, Krauss, Kodak. etc. In the 1970s, the western operation of Zeiss-Ikon collaborated with Yashica to produce the new Contax cameras, and many of the Zeiss lenses for this camera, among others, were produced by Yashica's optical arm, Tomioka. As Yashica's owner Kyocera ended camera production in 2006, and Yashica lenses were then made by Cosina, who also manufactured most of the new Zeiss designs for the new Zeiss Ikon coupled rangefinder camera. Another licensee active today is Sony who uses the Zeiss name on lenses on its video and digital still cameras.

== Business relationships ==
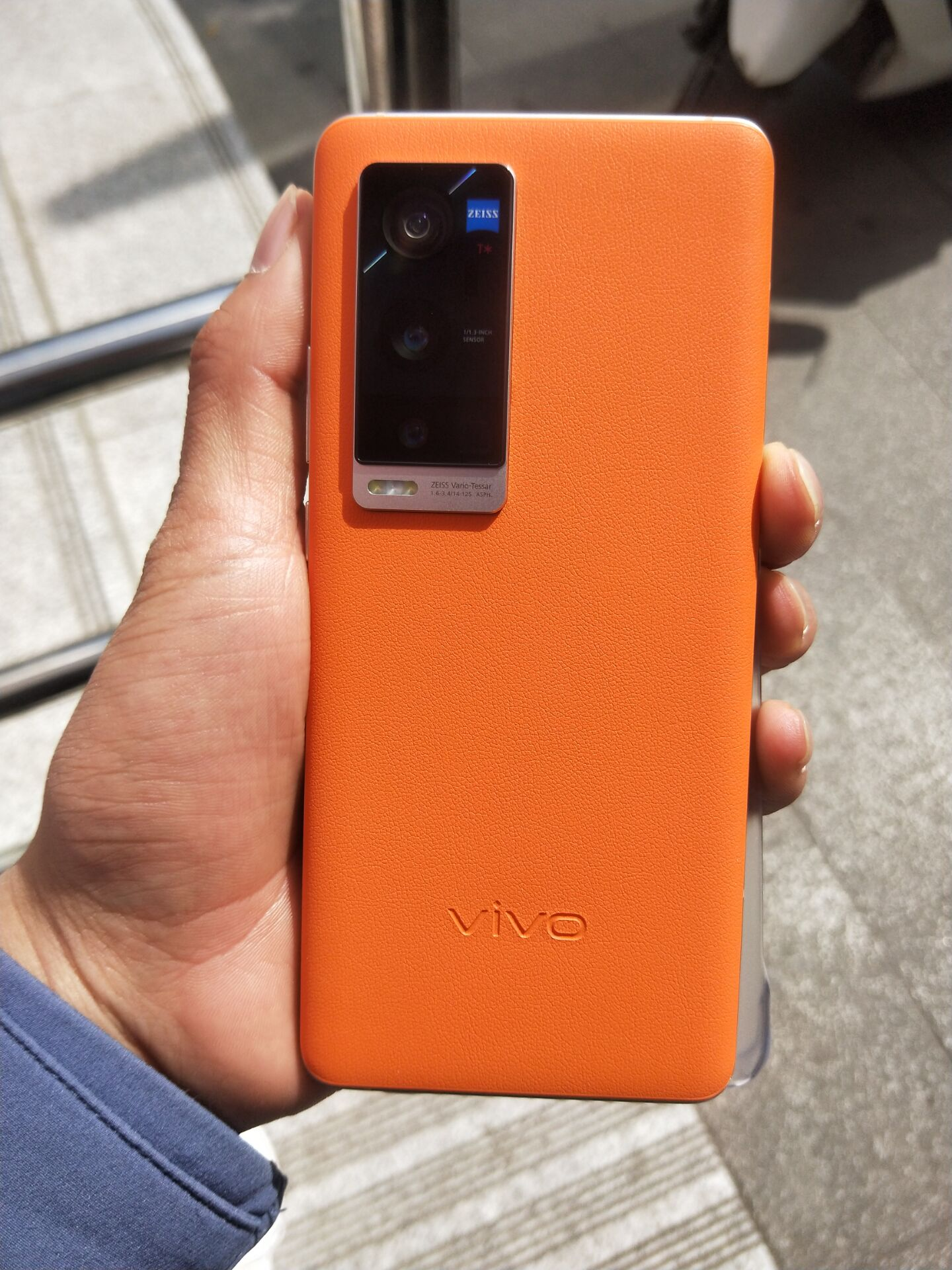
Vivo X60 featured the Zeiss co-engineered imaging system.

Zeiss has licensed its name or technology to various other companies including Hasselblad, Rollei, Yashica, Sony, Logitech and Alpa. The nature of the collaboration varies, from co-branding optics designed by another firm (e.g., Sony) to complete optical design and manufacturing (e.g., Hasselblad).

On 27 April 2005, the company announced a collaboration with Nokia in the camera phone market, with Zeiss providing camera optics. The first smartphone to be co-engineered with Zeiss optics was the Nokia N90, Zeiss will again provide optics for Nokia products through a collaboration with HMD Global announced on 6 July 2017.

On 17 December 2020, Vivo and Zeiss announced a long-term strategic partnership to jointly promote and develop breakthrough innovations in mobile imaging technology. The first "Vivo Zeiss co-engineered imaging system" will be featured in the Vivo X60 series, followed by Vivo X-Fold 3 Pro, and lowered to their V-series. As part of the collaboration agreement, Vivo and Zeiss will establish the Vivo Zeiss Imaging Lab, a joint R&D program to innovate mobile imaging technology for Vivo's flagship smartphones.

== Zeiss cameras ==
=== Zeiss Ikon film cameras ===
The Zeiss Ikon logo is based on the design of the rear cemented group in Rudolph's Tessar lens.

Zeiss Ikon was an independent camera company related to Carl Zeiss, formed by the merger of four camera makers (Contessa-Nettel, Ernemann, Goerz and ICA) in Dresden on September 15, 1926. Much of the capital came from Zeiss which also provided components for the cameras, including lenses and shutters through its subsidiaries such as Deckel. One of the four merged companies, Internationale Camera Actiengesellschaft (ICA AG), had been founded in 1909 shortly after Carl Zeiss Palmos, which had been co-founded by Zeiss lens designer Paul Rudolph and Curt Bentzin from Görlitz in 1899, went out of business. Another founding company, Contessa-Nettel, was operated by August Nagel, who left the company in 1928 to form the Nagel Works; in 1932, his company was bought by Kodak, which continued to produce cameras in Germany under the Retina brand.

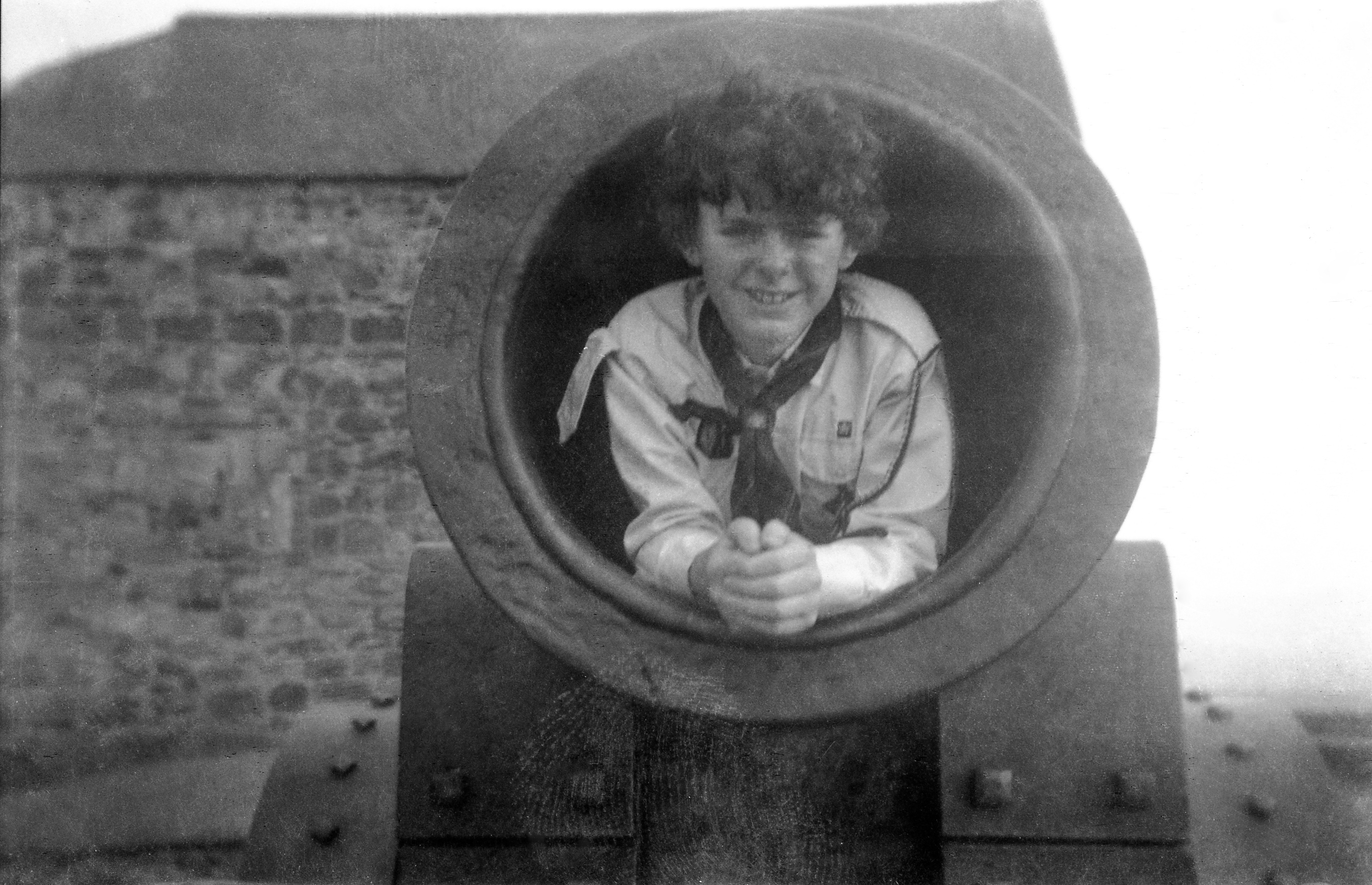
Photograph taken with a Zeiss Ikon Box Tengor 54/2 camera in 1971

The earliest Zeiss Ikon cameras were a range of medium and large format folding cameras badged as Nettar, Ikonta, and Super Ikonta, for film and glass plate photography. The most expensive was the Universal Juwel (Jewel), a glass plate camera originally designed by ICA in 1909. This was a favorite of both Ansel Adams and Dorothea Lange. Other models produced by Zeiss Ikon prior to World War II included the Baldur, named for Baldur von Schirach; the Contaflex, a twin-lens reflex; and the Tengor, a box camera derived from an earlier Goerz design. Despite German production, the folding Super Ikonta was among the mainstays of British Army photographers during World War II.

In 1932 Zeiss Ikon introduced the Contax line of 35mm rangefinder cameras, having recognised the potential for a system camera using 35mm film. The Contax I was introduced with a wide range of lenses and accessories for scientific and professional use. In 1936, an improved model, the Contax II, was introduced and became the favorite of many renowned photographers and journalists, including Robert Capa and Margaret Bourke-White. A second 35mm camera, the Contax III, was mechanically identical with a light meter grafted to the top of the camera.

Zeiss Ikon cameras

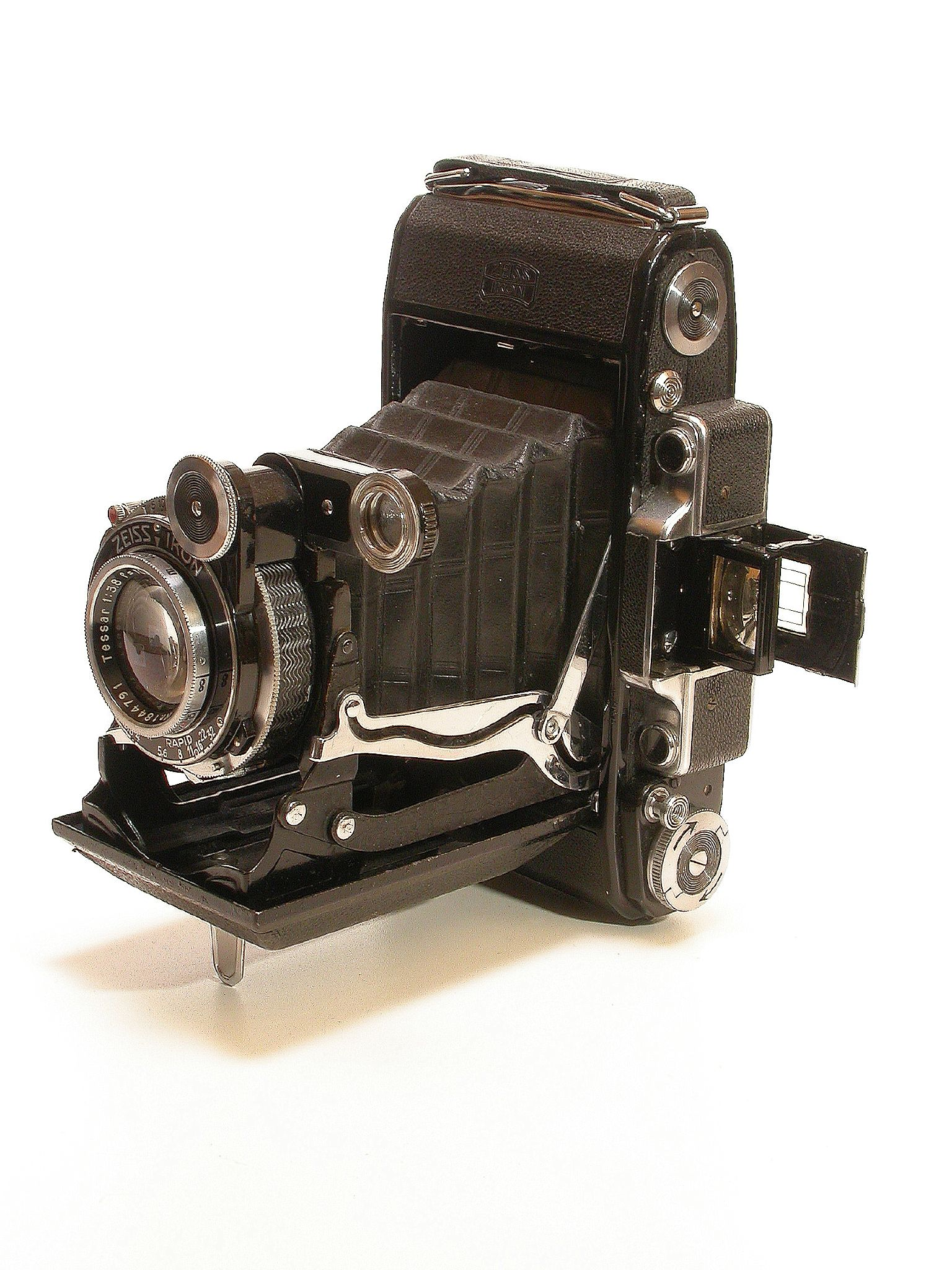
Super Ikonta folding rollfilm camera

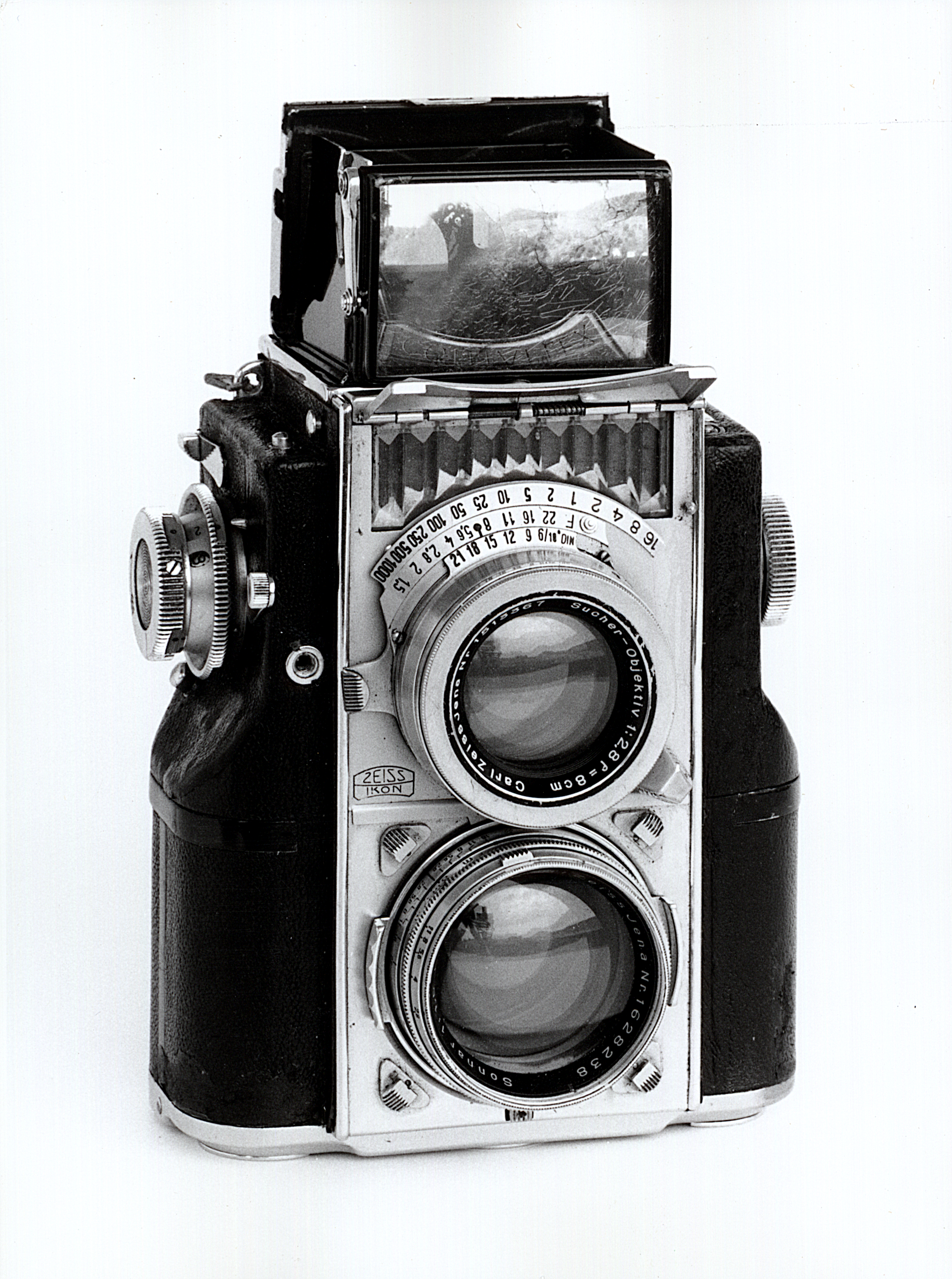
Contaflex TLR

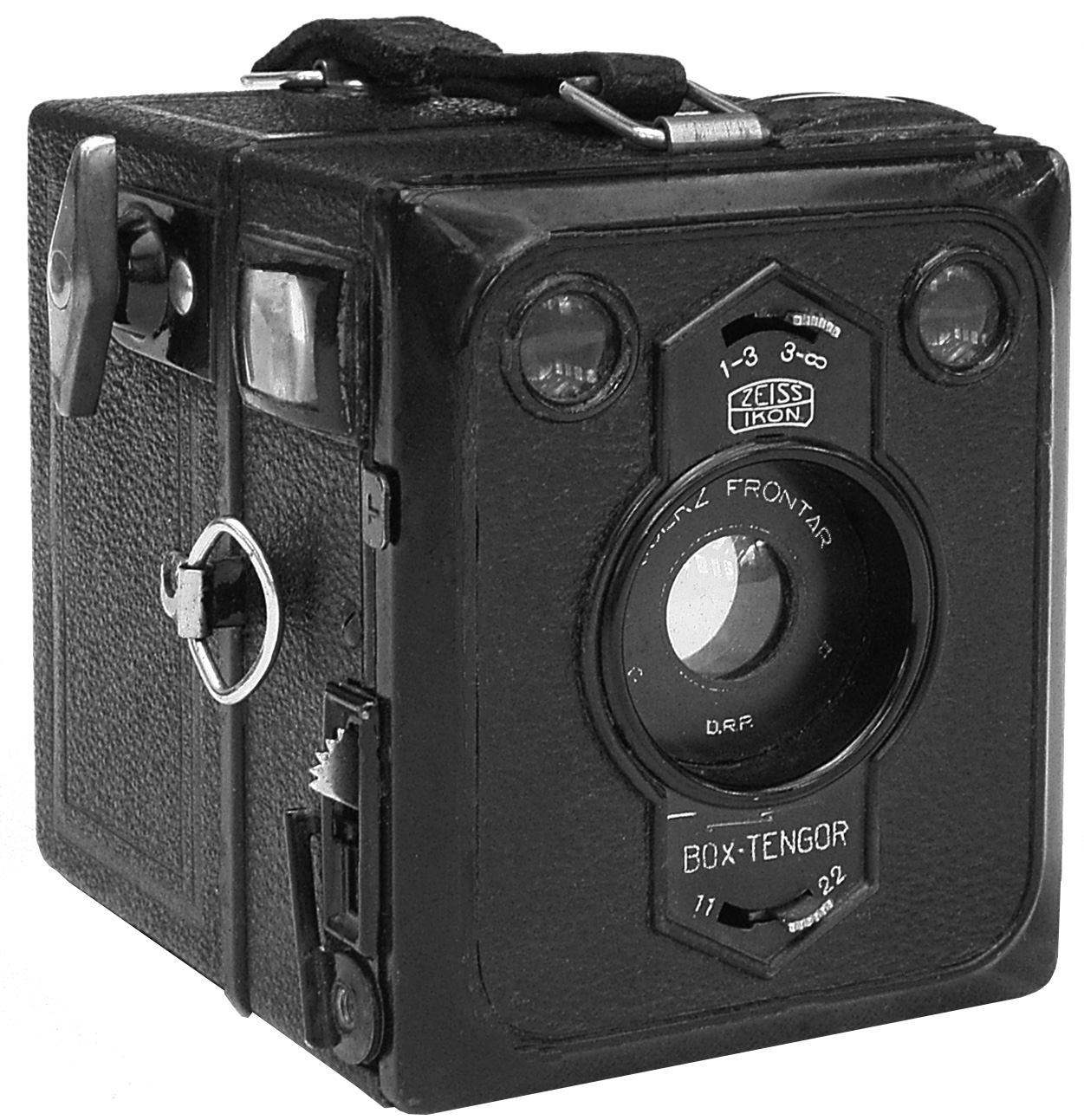
Box Tengor Model 54, c. 1932

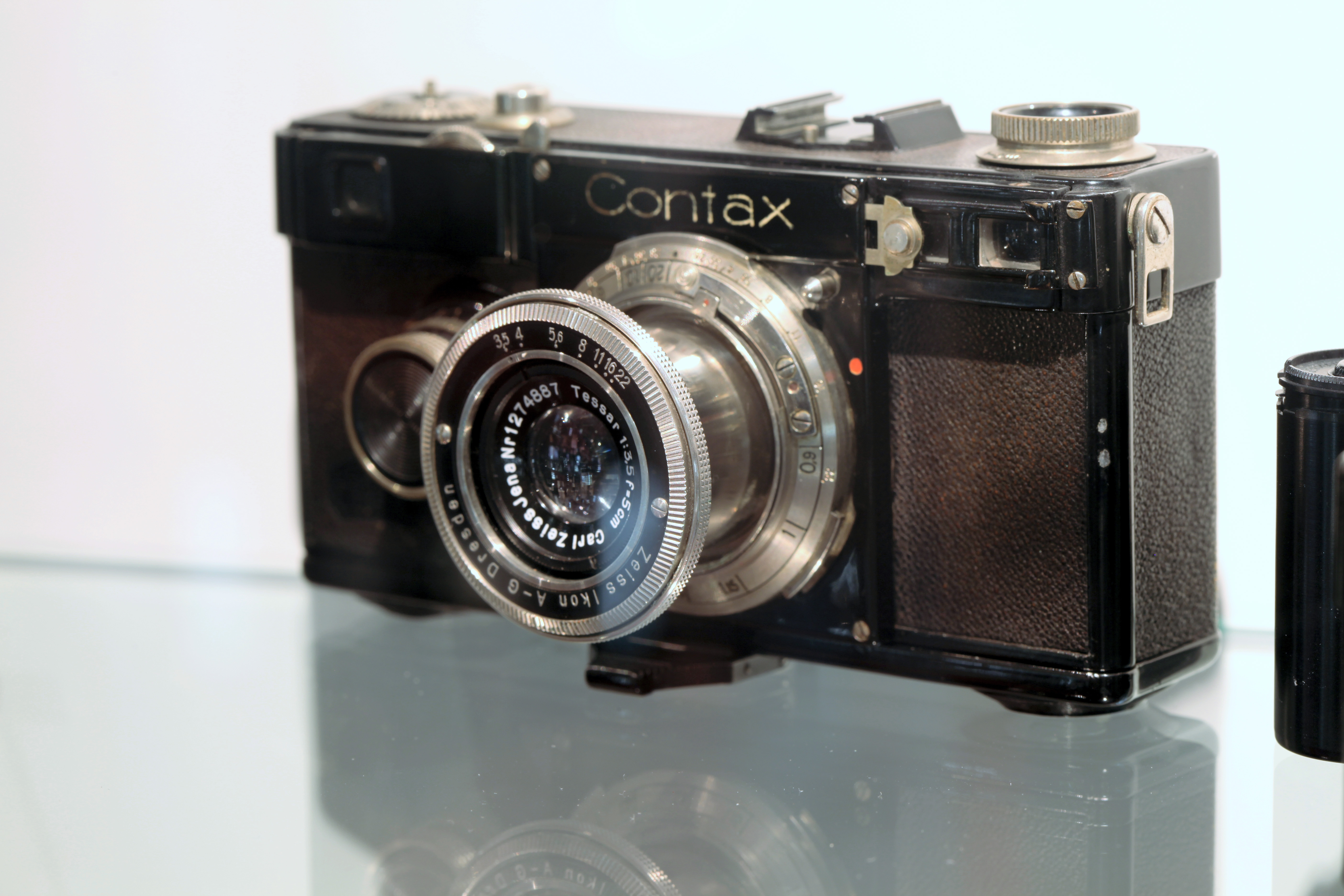
Contax I rangefinder camera (1932–36)

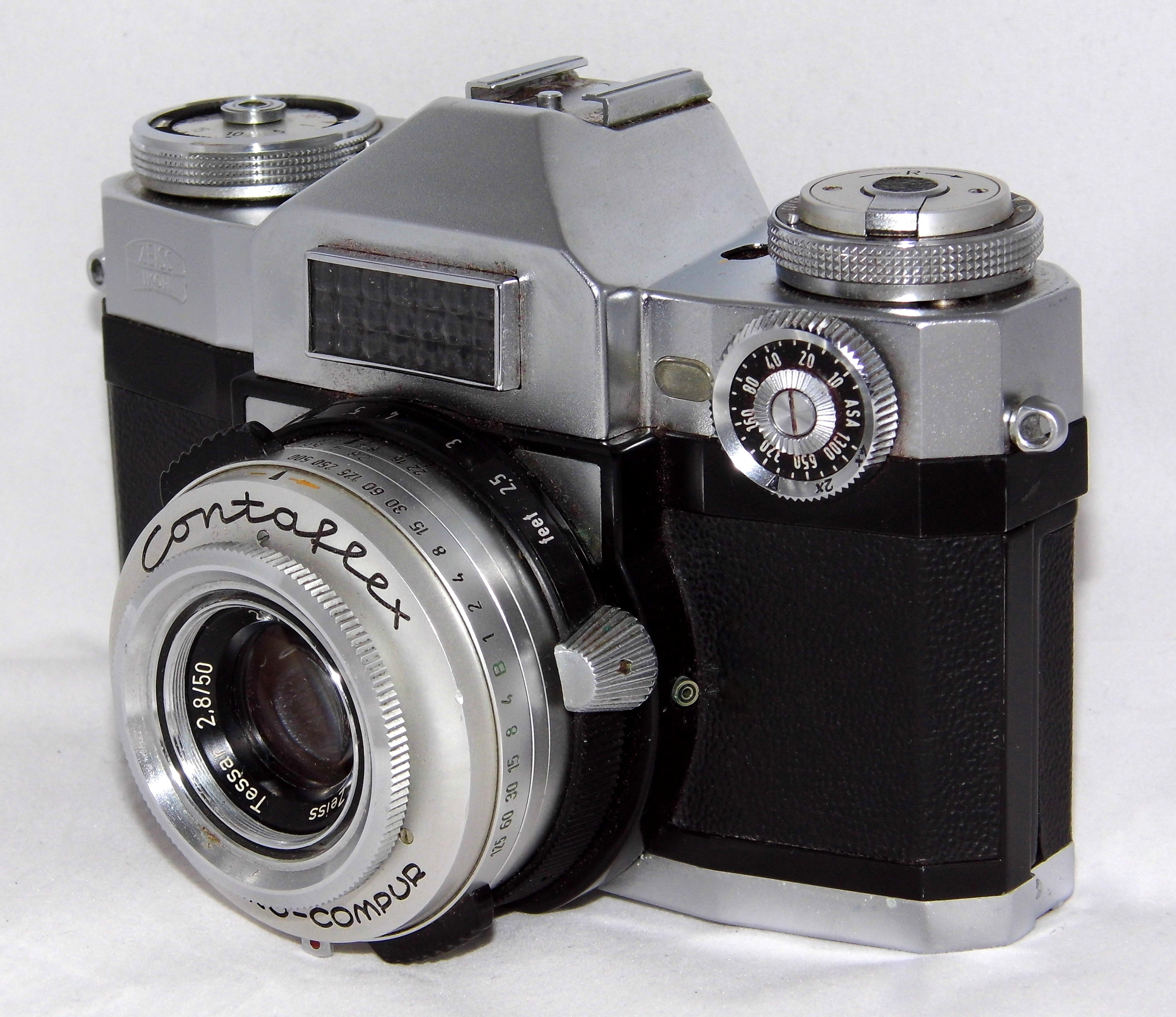
Contaflex SLR

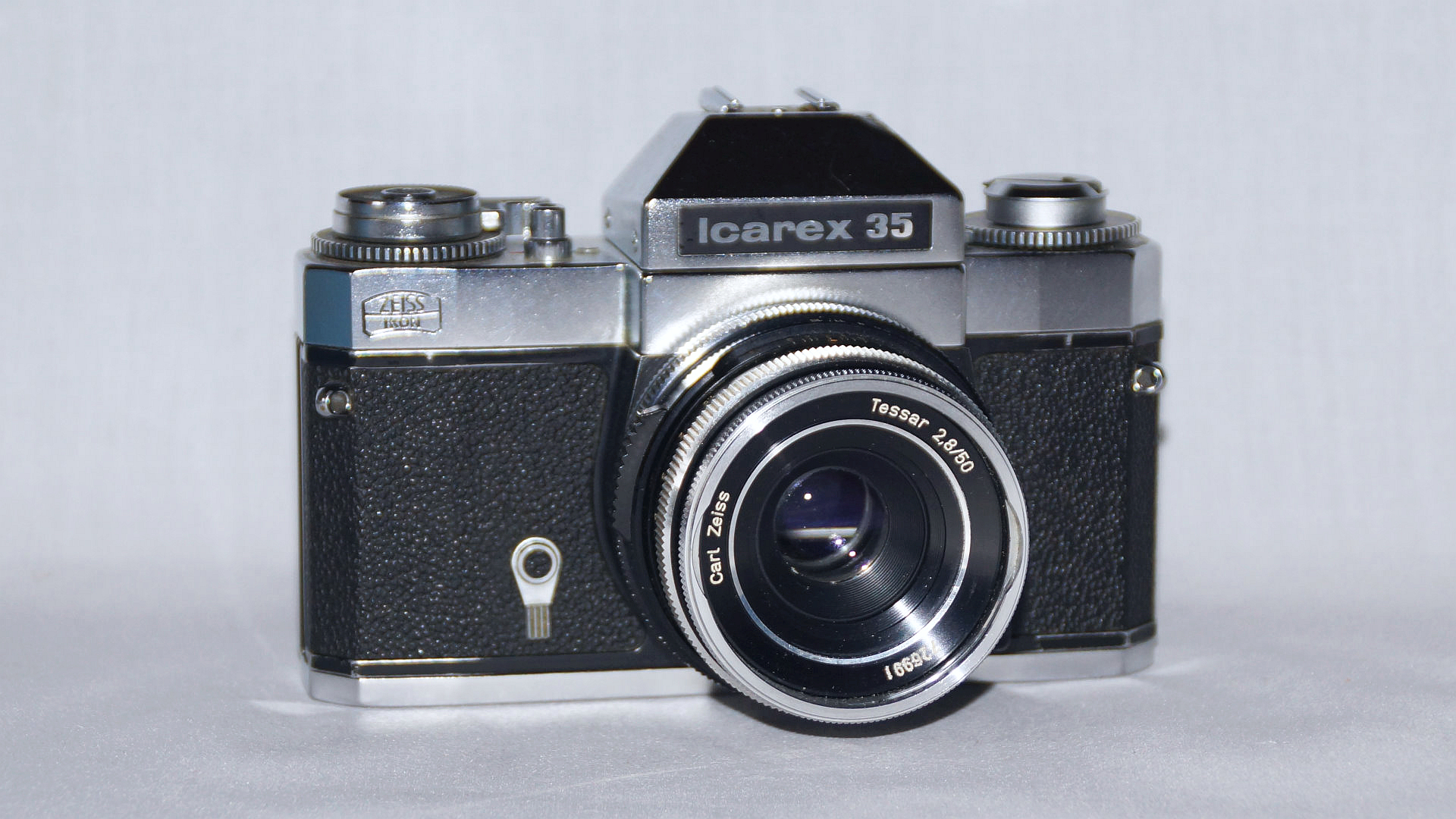
Icarex 35 SLR

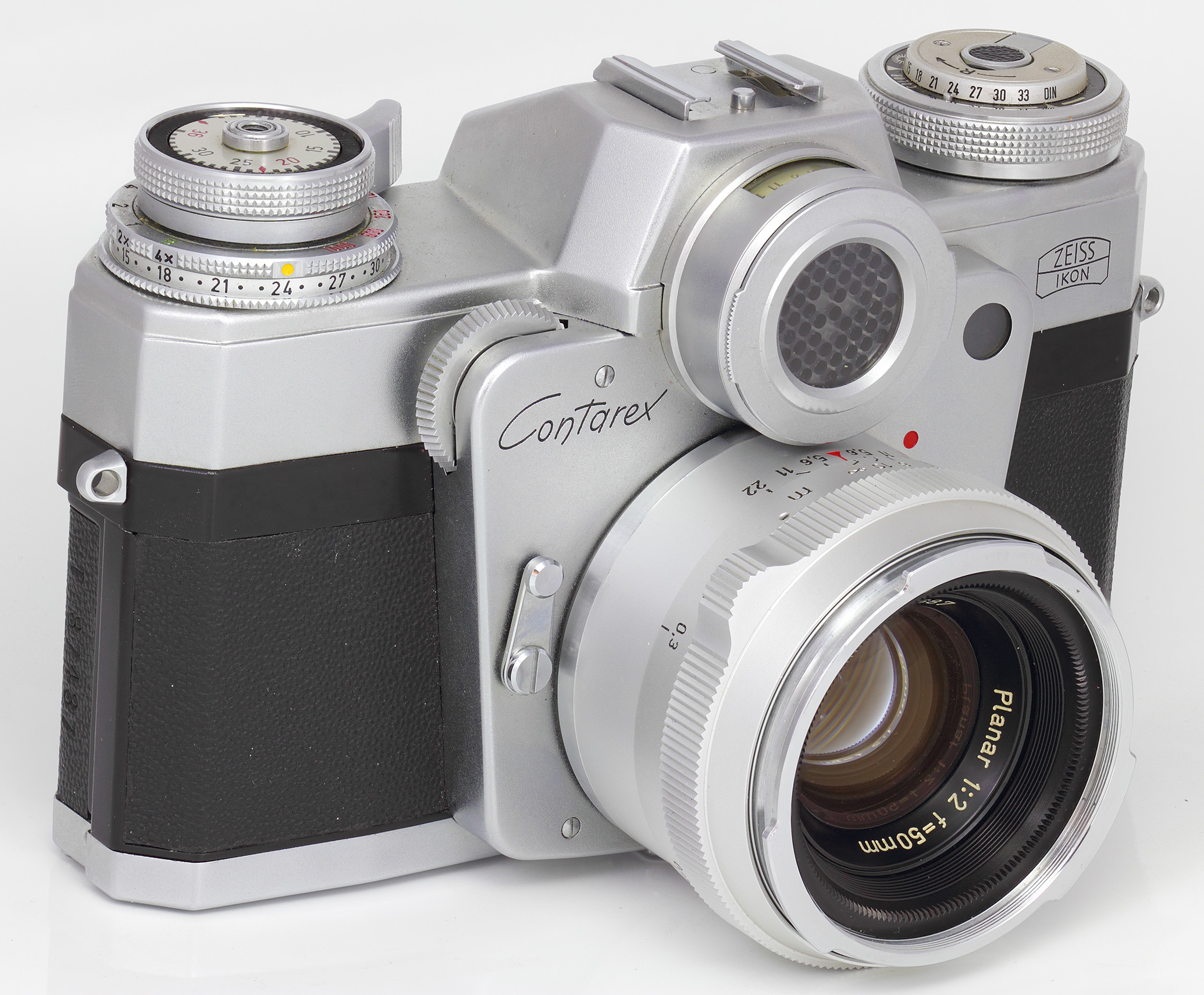
Contarex 1 ("Bullseye") SLR

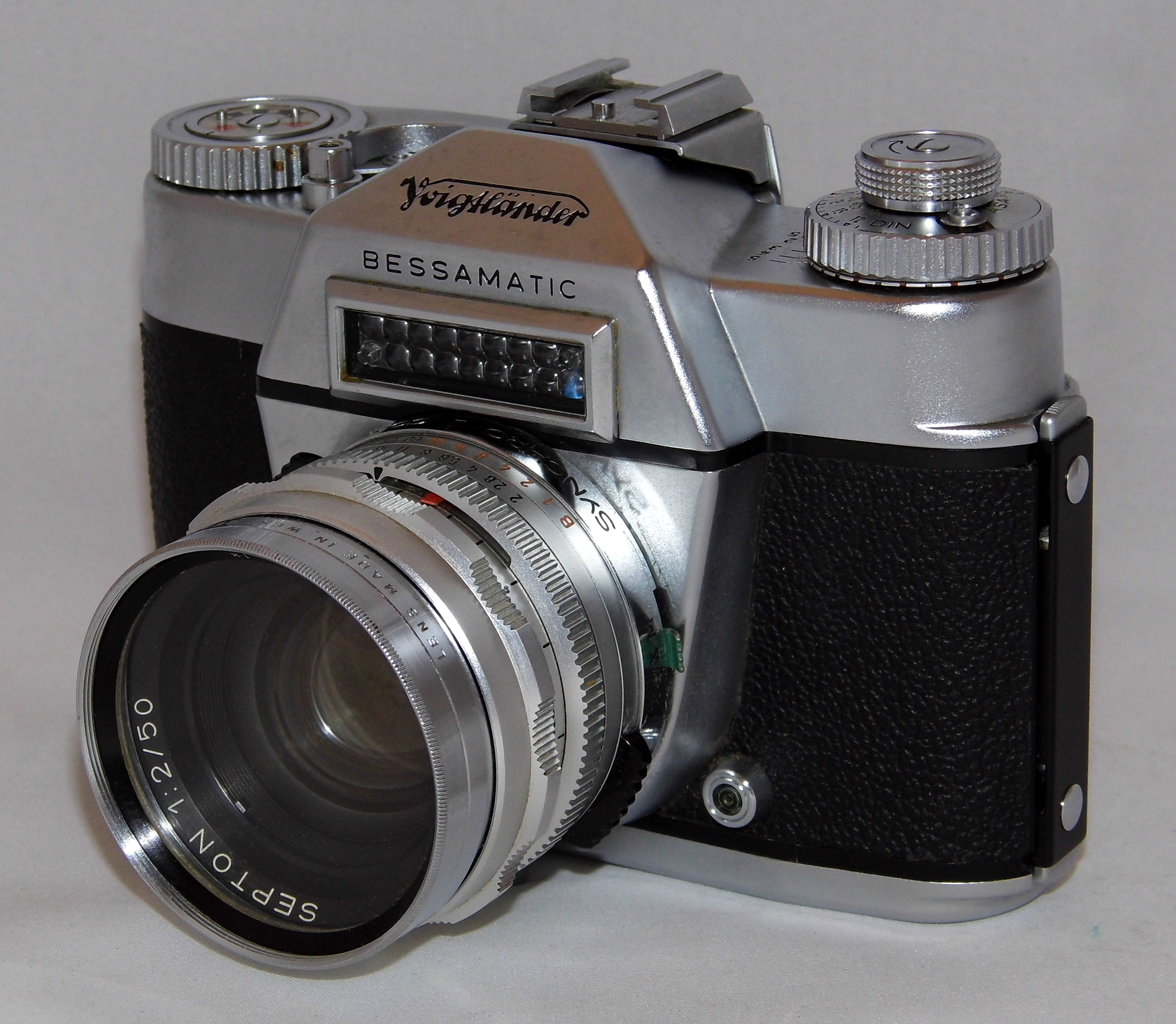
Voigtländer Bessamatic SLR

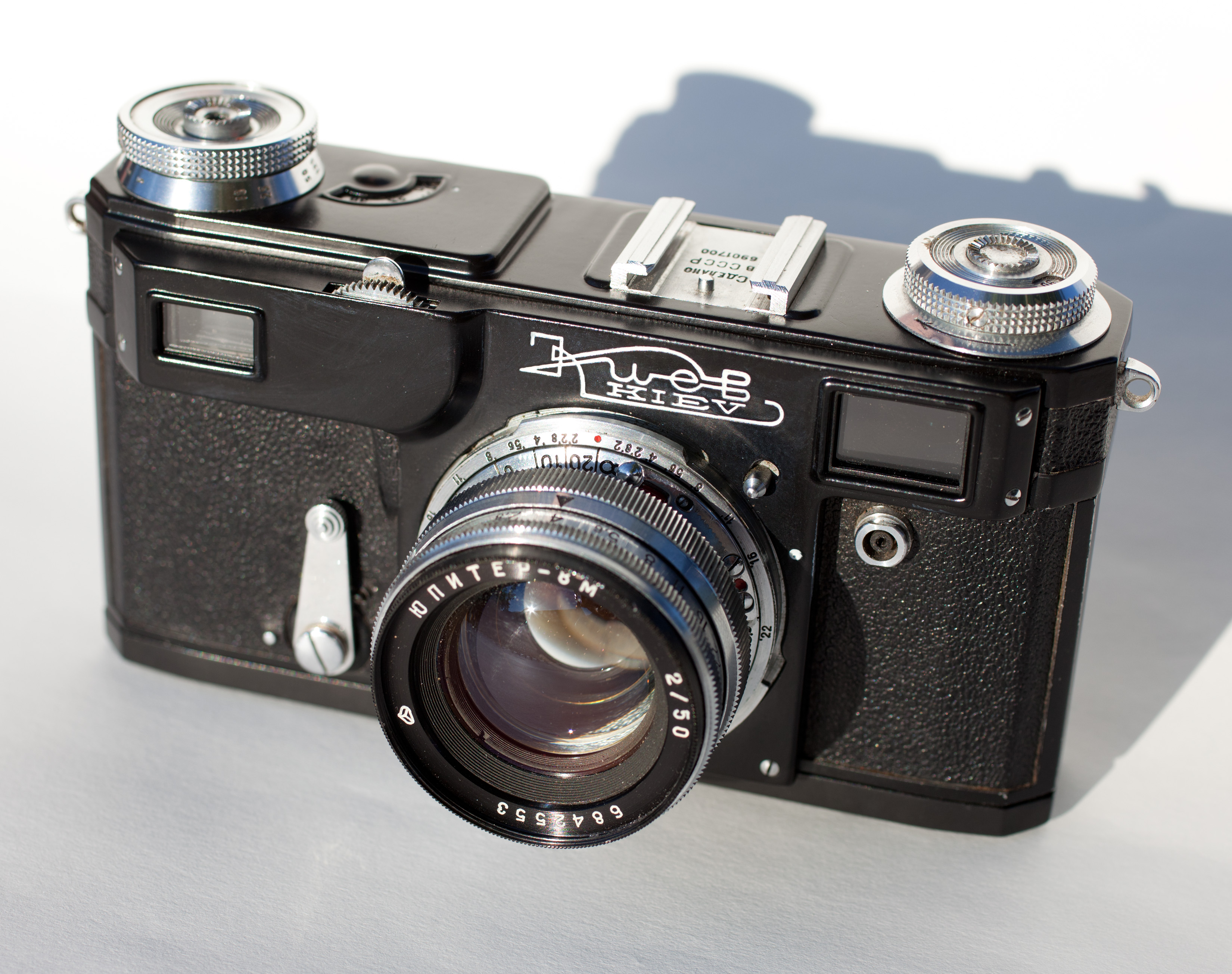
Kiev 4A rangefinder

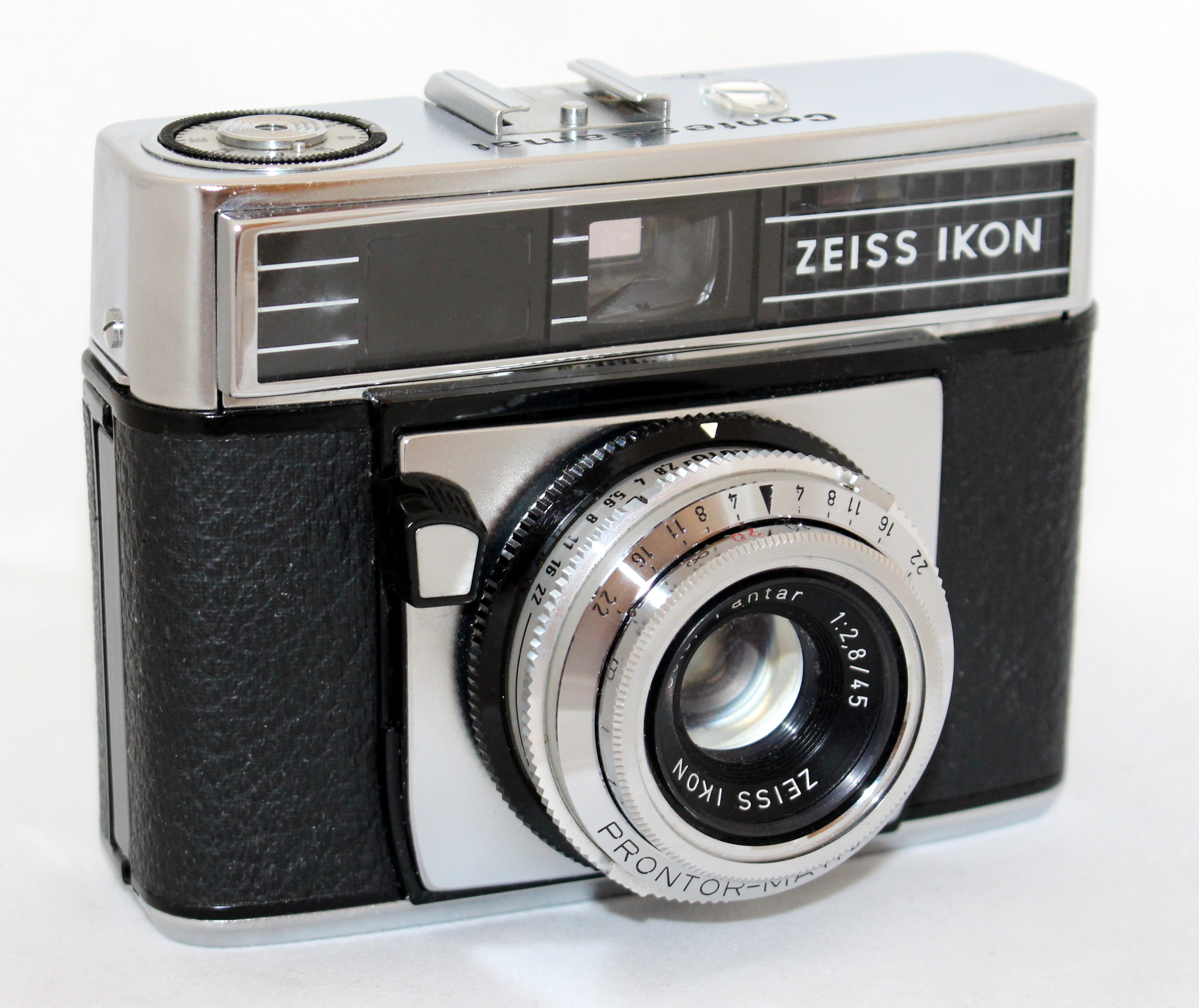
Contessamat compact

After World War II, the Dresden factory was dismantled and the Soviet Union forcibly relocated the Contax factory to Kiev as war reparations, where the pre-war Contax II and III camera designs were produced under the Kiev brand. The first Kiev cameras were identical except for logos.

The United States also relocated Zeiss from Jena to Heidenheim (Oberkochen) in 1945, but Zeiss Ikon were without designs or facilities for making the Contax and set about producing an improved replacement. These were named the Contax IIa and IIIa, and were smaller and lighter than the original designs. But by the time the IIa and IIIa hit the market, they faced strong competition from many European and Asian brands, notably the visually similar Nikon produced by Nippon Kogaku, which was a high quality camera sharing the same lens-mount and most of the features. Zeiss Ikon prevented some European distribution under the theory that "Nikon" was an infringement on their brand name.

Starting in the mid-1950s, Zeiss Ikon shifted its focus to market single-lens reflex cameras in three distinct lines: the Contaflex line (1953) for amateurs with leaf shutters, the high-end Contarex line (1959) with film magazine backs and superb optics, and the mid-range Icarex line (1967) with focal plane shutters and either the popular M42 lens mount or a proprietary bayonet mount. While these designs were initially competitive with SLRs produced by Japanese brands including Canon, Yashica, Minolta, and Nikon, Zeiss Ikon failed to keep pace by adding features and Zeiss Ikon camera production ceased in 1971.

=== Voigtländer ===
Zeiss also acquired the Voigtländer brand in 1956, putting it in the curious position of offering competing cameras in the same market segments, including professional rangefinders (Prominent (135), in competition with the Contax), amateur SLRs (Bessamatic/Ultramatic, competing with the Contaflex), and numerous compact and folding cameras through at least 1967, when the Icarex, a Voigtländer design released under the Zeiss Ikon brand, was released to consolidate the competing SLR lines.

After Zeiss Ikon stopped producing cameras, the Voigtländer brand and Icarex designs were acquired by Rollei, which released variations of the Icarex under both Voigtländer and Rollei as the Rolleiflex SL35 M.

=== Cameras produced under Zeiss licenses ===
Zeiss-licensed cameras

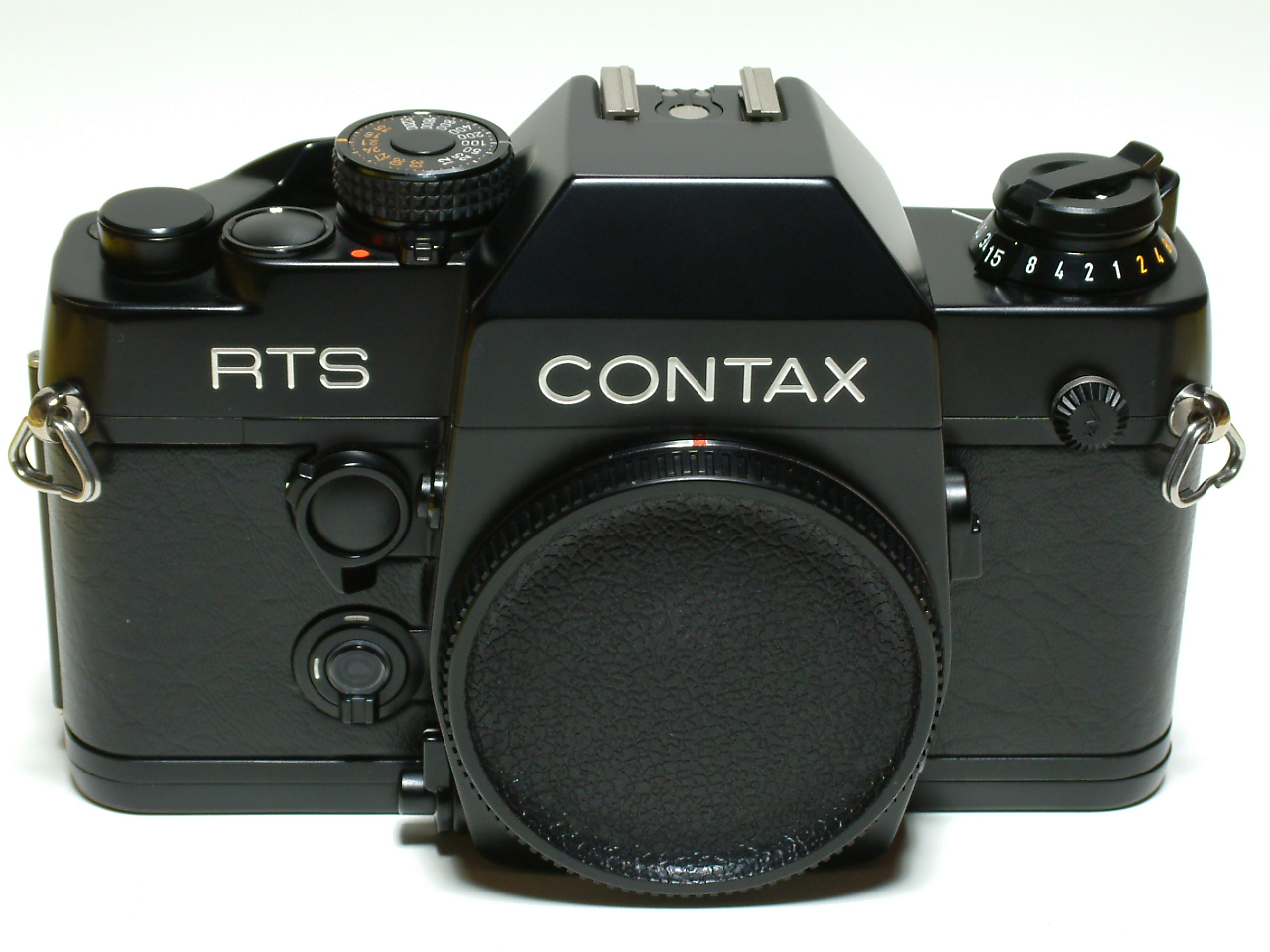
Contax RTS II (Yashica/Kyocera)

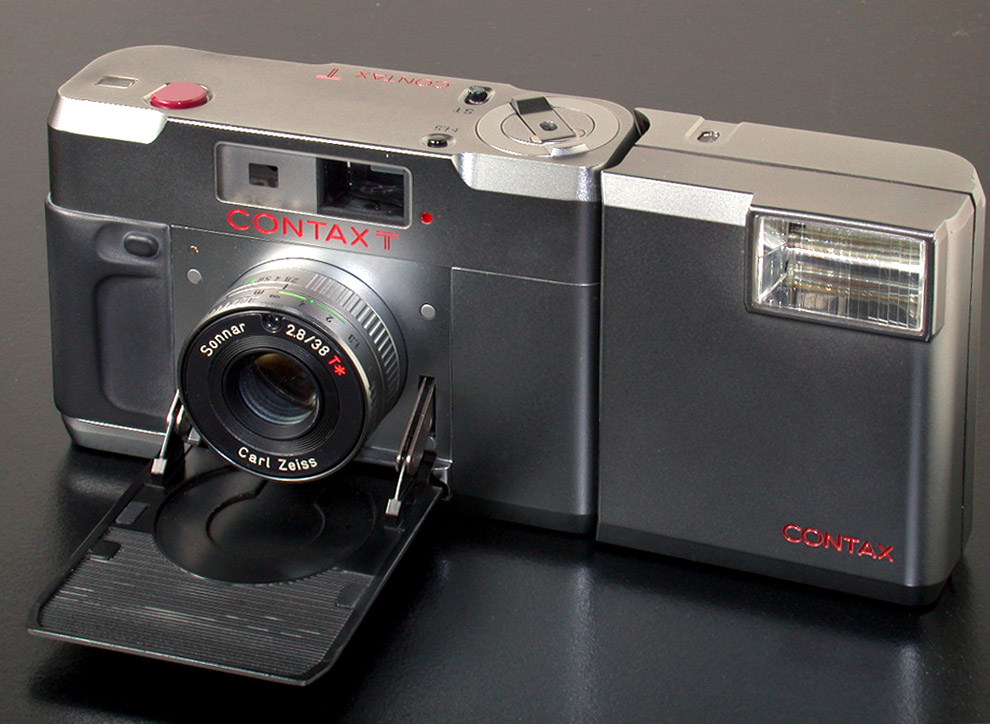
Contax T (Yashica/Kyocera)

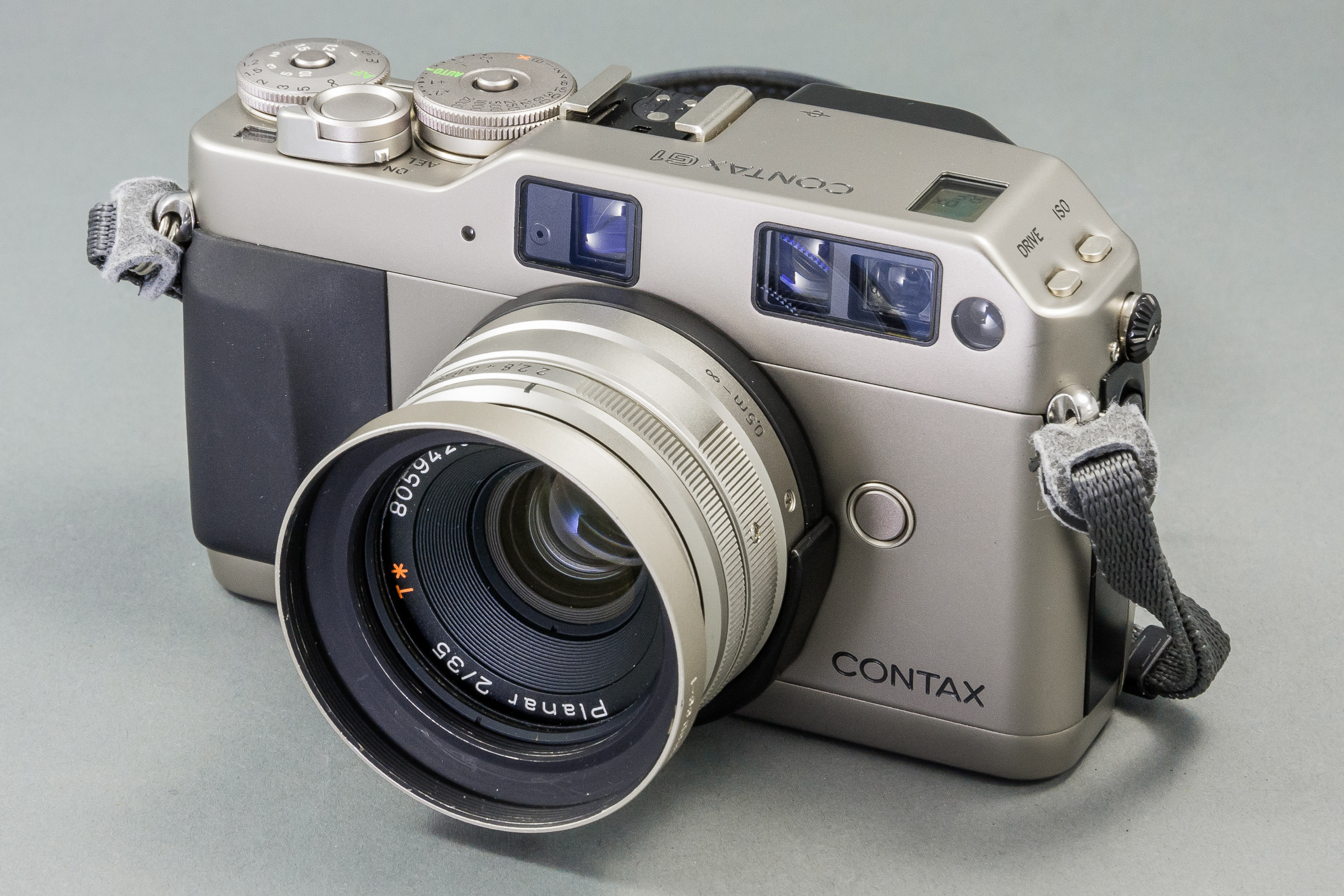
Contax G1 (Yashica/Kyocera)

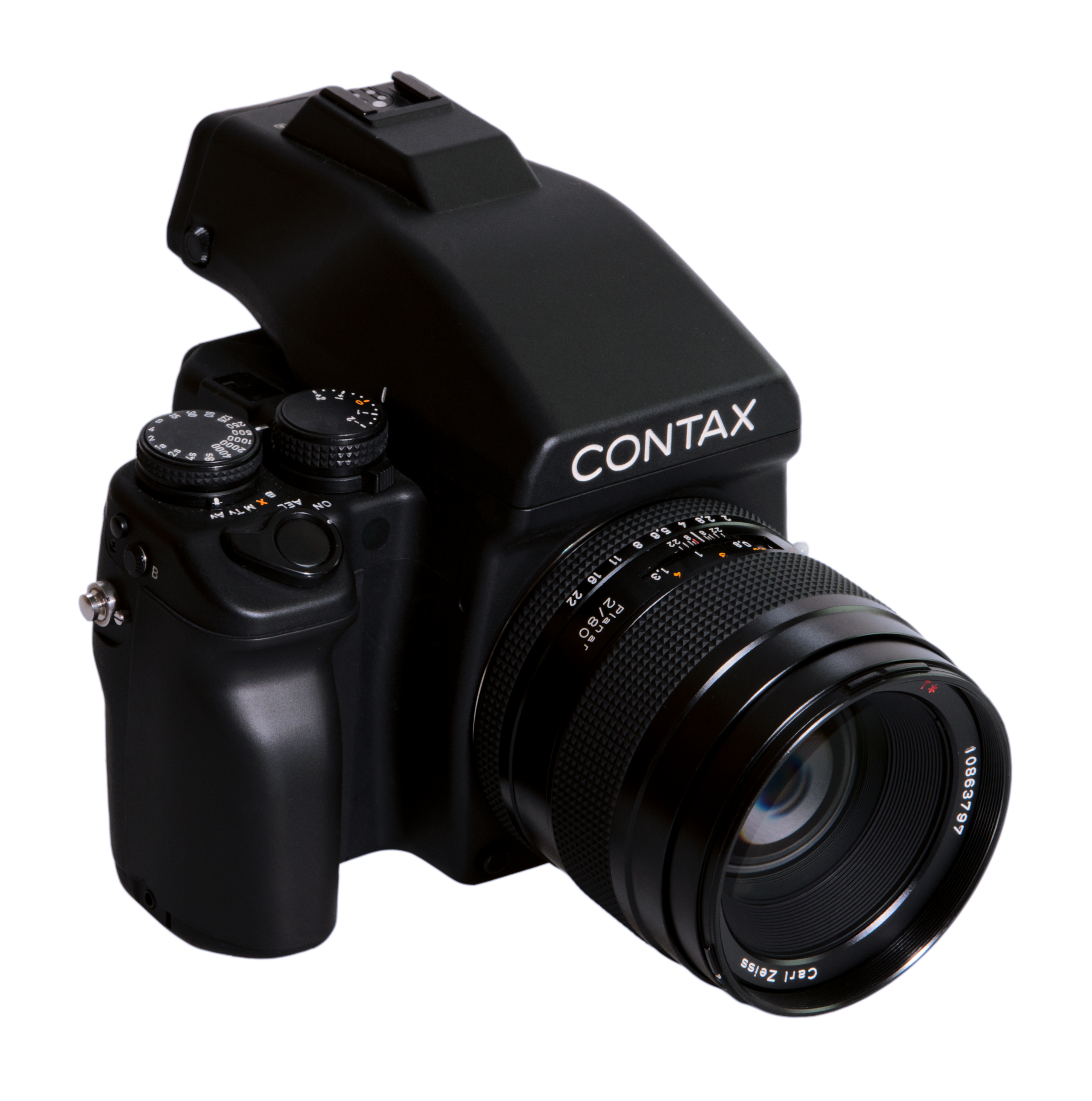
Contax 645 (Yashica/Kyocera)

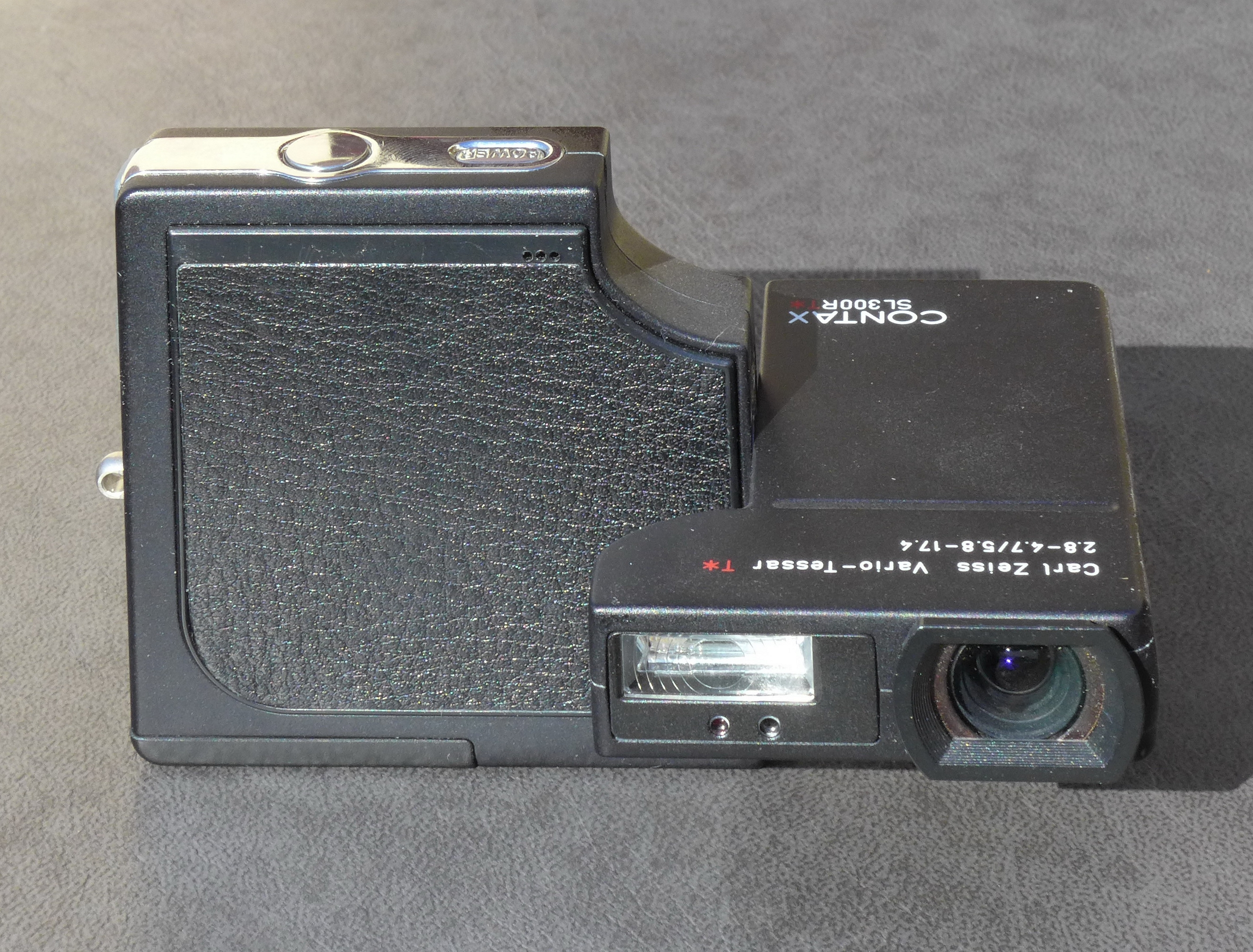
Contax SL300RT digital (Yashica/Kyocera)

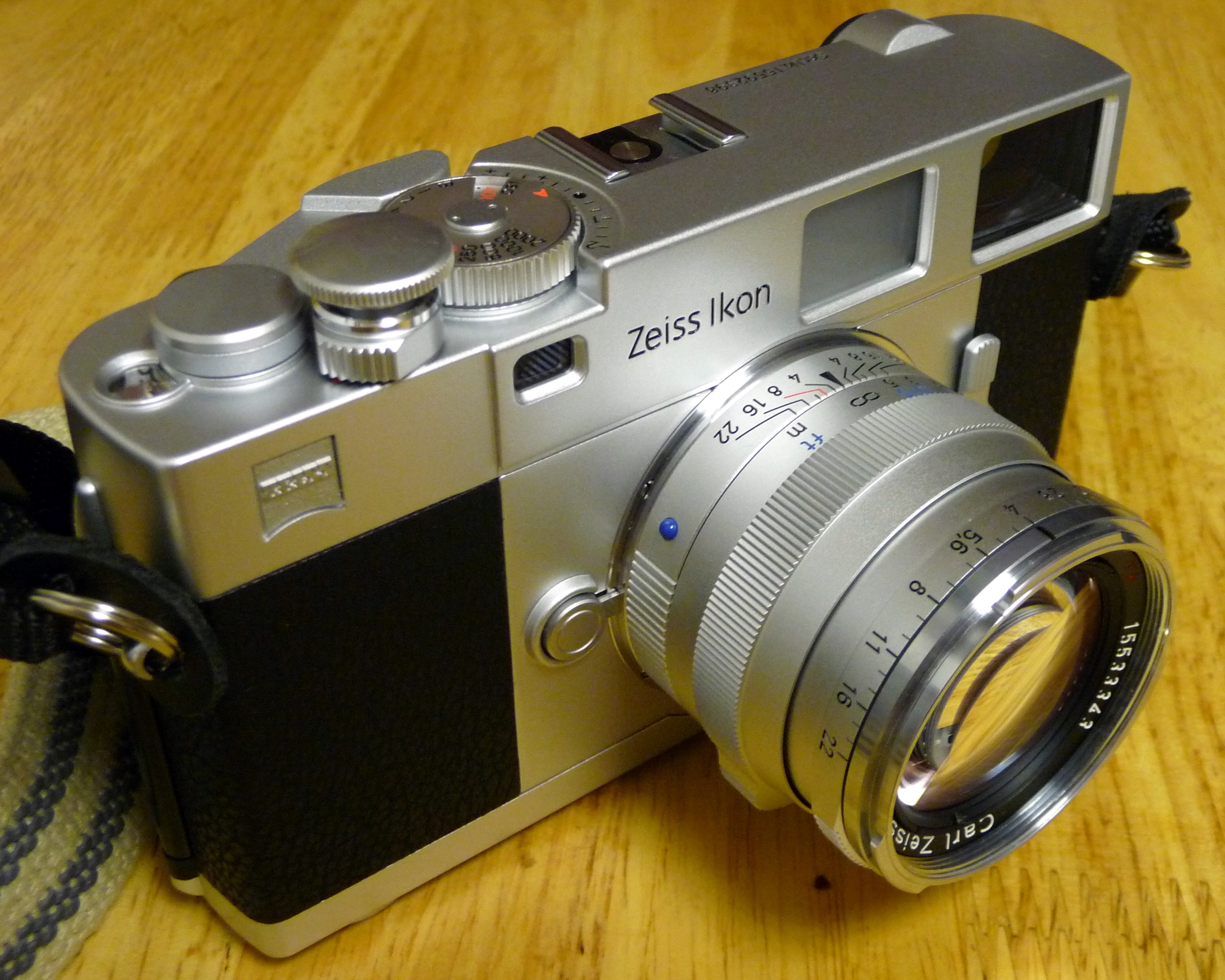
Zeiss Ikon rangefinder (Cosina)

Since 1972, some 35mm cameras have been marketed under the "Contax" and "Zeiss Ikon" brands. The "Contax" brand was licensed to Yashica in 1974, which later was acquired by Kyocera; Contax marketed several lines of SLR, rangefinder, compact, and digital cameras with Zeiss lenses and Japanese-built bodies. The most recent "Zeiss Ikon" rangefinder camera was an M mount camera with automatic exposure, introduced by Zeiss in 2004 and manufactured in Japan by Cosina; it was discontinued in 2012.

=== ZX1 digital ===
The Zeiss ZX1 full-frame 35mm F/2 large-sensor compact camera was announced during Photokina 2018 with the slogan 'Shoot – Edit – Share'. The camera incorporates Adobe Lightroom Mobile editing capacities, and an internal 512GB SSD affording 6,800 DNG-format RAW images or 50,000 JPEG-format compressed images. The ZX1, which was one of only a few cameras to use the Android operating system, was discontinued in 2023.

== Camera lenses ==
=== Cinema lenses ===
Carl Zeiss AG has long produced motion picture lenses. Zeiss manufactures prime and zoom lenses for 35mm, 16mm, and 65mm film production. They also make lenses for digital cinema and high definition video, and has maintained an association with the German camera manufacturer Arri for whom they currently produce lenses.

Current models of Zeiss cinema lenses are:

- Master Prime T✻XP Distagon 14 mm T1.3
- Master Prime T✻XP Distagon 16 mm T1.3
- Master Prime T✻XP Distagon 18 mm T1.3
- Master Prime T✻XP Distagon 21 mm T1.3
- Master Prime T✻XP Distagon 25 mm T1.3
- Master Prime T✻XP Distagon 27 mm T1.3
- Master Prime T✻XP Distagon 32 mm T1.3
- Master Prime T✻XP Distagon 35 mm T1.3
- Master Prime T✻XP Distagon 40 mm T1.3
- Master Prime T✻XP Planar 50 mm T1.3
- Master Prime T✻XP Planar 65 mm T1.3
- Master Prime T✻XP Sonnar 75 mm T1.3
- Master Prime T✻XP Sonnar 100 mm T1.3
- Master Prime T✻XP Sonnar 150 mm T1.3
- Master Zoom T✻XP 16.5–110 mm T2.6
- Master Macro T✻XP Makro-Planar 100 mm T2.0/T4.3
- Lightweight Zoom LWZ.2 T✻XP Vario-Sonnar 15.5–45 mm T2.6
- Ultra Prime 8R T✻ Distagon 8 mm T2.8
- Ultra Prime T✻ Distagon 10 mm T2.1
- Ultra Prime T✻ Distagon 12 mm T1.9
- Ultra Prime T✻ Distagon 14 mm T1.9
- Ultra Prime T✻ Distagon 16 mm T1.9
- Ultra Prime T✻ Distagon 20 mm T1.9
- Ultra Prime T✻ Distagon 24 mm T1.9
- Ultra Prime T✻ Distagon 28 mm T1.9
- Ultra Prime T✻ Distagon 32 mm T1.9
- Ultra Prime T✻ Distagon 40 mm T1.9
- Ultra Prime T✻ Planar 50 mm T1.9
- Ultra Prime T✻ Planar 65 mm T1.9
- Ultra Prime T✻ Planar 85 mm T1.9
- Ultra Prime T✻ Sonnar 100 mm T1.9
- Ultra Prime T✻ Sonnar 135 mm T1.9
- Ultra Prime T✻ Sonnar 180 mm T1.9
- Compact Prime CP.2 T✻ Distagon 18 mm T3.6
- Compact Prime CP.2 T✻XP Distagon 21 mm T2.9
- Compact Prime CP.2 T✻XP Distagon 25 mm T2.9
- Compact Prime CP.2 T✻XP Distagon 28 mm T2.1
- Compact Prime CP.2 T✻XP Distagon 35 mm T2.1
- Compact Prime CP.2 T✻XP Distagon 50 mm T2.1
- Compact Prime CP.2 T✻ Planar 50 mm T2.1 Macro
- Compact Prime CP.2 T✻ Planar 85 mm T2.1
- Compact Prime CP.2 T✻ Makro-Planar 100 mm T2.1 CF
- Ultra 16 T✻XP Distagon 6 mm T1.3
- Ultra 16 T✻XP Distagon 8 mm T1.3
- Ultra 16 T✻XP Distagon 9.5 mm T1.3
- Ultra 16 T✻XP Distagon 12 mm T1.3
- Ultra 16 T✻XP Distagon 14 mm T1.3
- Ultra 16 T✻XP Distagon 18 mm T1.3
- Ultra 16 T✻XP Distagon 25 mm T1.3
- Ultra 16 T✻XP Planar 35 mm T1.3
- Ultra 16 T✻XP Planar 50 mm T1.3
- DigiPrime T✻ 3.9 mm T1.9
- DigiPrime T✻ 5 mm T1.9
- DigiPrime T✻ 7 mm T1.6
- DigiPrime T✻ 10 mm T1.6
- DigiPrime T✻ 14 mm T1.6
- DigiPrime T✻ 20 mm T1.6
- DigiPrime T✻ 28 mm T1.6
- DigiPrime T✻ 40 mm T1.6
- DigiPrime T✻ 52 mm T1.6
- DigiPrime T✻ 70 mm T1.6
- DigiPrime T✻ 135 mm T1.9
- DigiZoom T✻ Vario-Sonnar 6–24 mm T1.9
- DigiZoom T✻ Vario-Sonnar 17–112 mm T1.9

=== Medium-format lenses ===
Carl Zeiss AG has produced lenses for Hasselblad and Rollei cameras, including:

- CFi/CFE-Lenses for Hasselblad 500 (V System)
  - F-Distagon T✻ 30mm ƒ/3.5
  - Distagon T✻ 40mm ƒ/4
  - Distagon T✻ 50mm ƒ/4
  - Distagon T✻ 50mm ƒ/4 ZV
  - Distagon T✻ 60mm ƒ/3.5
  - Planar T✻ 80mm ƒ/2,8
  - Planar T✻ 100mm ƒ/3.5
  - Makro-Planar T✻ 120mm ƒ/4
  - Makro-Planar T✻ 120mm ƒ/4 ZV
  - Sonnar T✻ 150mm ƒ/4
  - Sonnar T✻ 180mm ƒ/4
  - Sonnar T✻ 250mm ƒ/5.6
  - Tele-Superachromat T✻ 350mm ƒ/5,6
- FE-Lenses for Hasselblad 200
  - Distagon T✻ 50mm ƒ/2,8 FE
  - Planar T✻ 110mm ƒ/2 FE
- Hasselblad SWC Biogon 38mm ƒ/4.5
- Rollei 6000 system
  - F-Distagon 30mm ƒ/3.5 HFT PQ
  - Distagon 40mm ƒ/4 FLE HFT
  - Distagon 50mm ƒ/4 FLE HFT
  - Distagon 60mm ƒ/3.5 HFT PQ
  - Planar 80mm ƒ/2.8 HFT PQS
  - Planar 110mm ƒ/2 HFT PQ
  - Sonnar 150mm ƒ/4 HFT PQS
  - Sonnar 250mm ƒ/5.6 HFT PQS
  - Makro-Planar 120mm ƒ/4 HFT PQS
- Rolleiflex TLR
  - Tessar 75mm ƒ/3.5
  - Planar 80mm ƒ/2.8
  - Distagon 55mm ƒ/4

=== Large-format lenses ===
Zeiss has produced lenses for large format and press cameras, including:

- Tessar lenses (4 elements in 3 groups)
  - Tessar 100mm ƒ/3.5 (6.5×9 cm format)
  - Tessar 105mm ƒ/3.5 (6.5×9 cm fmt)
  - Tessar 150mm ƒ/4.5 (9×12 cm fmt)
- Planar lenses (5 elements in 4 groups)
  - Planar 80mm ƒ/2.8 (6×7 cm fmt)
  - Planar 100mm ƒ/2.8 (6.5×9 cm fmt)
  - Planar 135mm ƒ/3.5
  - Planar 135mm ƒ/3.5 T✻
  - Planar 150mm ƒ/2.8
- Sonnar lenses
  - Sonnar 180mm ƒ/4.8
  - Sonnar 250mm ƒ/5.6
- Biogon lenses
  - Biogon 45mm ƒ/4.5 (6×7 cm fmt)
  - Biogon 53mm ƒ/4.5 (6.5×9 cm fmt)
  - Biogon 75mm ƒ/4.5 (9×12 cm fmt)
- Lenses for Linhof cameras
  - Biogon 53mm ƒ/4.5
  - Hologon 110mm ƒ/8
  - Planar 135mm ƒ/3.5
  - Sonnar 250mm ƒ/5.6

Zeiss has departed the large-format optics field along with Nikon, leaving Schneider and Rodenstock as the primary makers of such lenses today.

=== ZM lenses ===
Zeiss ZM lenses fit Leica M mount cameras, including Leica M series, the Ricoh GXR A12, and many mirrorless interchangeable-lens cameras through the use of adapters. Some ZM lenses are manufactured in Germany by Zeiss, others in Japan by Cosina. Lenses designated "C" are considered compact or classic lenses.

- Distagon T✻ 15mm ƒ/2.8 (Made in Germany)
- Distagon T✻ 18mm ƒ/4
- Distagon T✻ 21mm ƒ/2.8
- C Biogon T✻ 21mm ƒ/4.5
- Biogon T✻ 25mm ƒ/2.8
- Biogon T✻ 28mm ƒ/2.8
- Distagon T✻ 35mm ƒ/1.4
- Biogon T✻ 35mm ƒ/2
- C Biogon T✻ 35mm ƒ/2.8
- C Sonnar T✻ 50mm ƒ/1.5
- Planar T✻ 50mm ƒ/2
- Tele-Tessar T✻ 85mm ƒ/4
- Sonnar T✻ 85mm ƒ/2 (Made in Germany)

Zeiss claims that the 25mm ƒ/2.8 ZM achieves a resolution of 400 lp/mm in the center of the image at ƒ/4, which is equal to the calculated diffraction limit for this aperture.

=== Z-series SLR lenses ===
Zeiss produces optically identical manual-focus lenses for multiple SLR lens mounts under the ZE, ZF, ZK, and ZS lines, manufactured in Japan by Cosina to Zeiss specifications.

Optical design	ZE	ZF	ZF.2	ZF-I	ZF-IR	ZK	ZS
Distagon T✻ 15mm ƒ/2.8	✓		✓				
Distagon T✻ 18mm ƒ/3.5	✓	✓	✓			✓	
Distagon T✻ 21mm ƒ/2.8	✓	✓	✓			✓	
Distagon T✻ 25mm ƒ/2.0	✓		✓				
Distagon T✻ 25mm ƒ/2.8		✓	✓	✓	✓	✓	✓
Distagon T✻ 28mm ƒ/2.0	✓	✓	✓	✓		✓	
Distagon T✻ 35mm ƒ/1.4	✓		✓				
Distagon T✻ 35mm ƒ/2.0	✓	✓	✓	✓		✓	✓
Planar T✻ 50mm ƒ/1.4	✓	✓	✓		✓	✓	✓
Makro-Planar T✻ 50mm ƒ/2.0	✓	✓	✓			✓	
Planar T✻ 85mm ƒ/1.4	✓	✓	✓		✓	✓	
Makro-Planar T✻ 100mm ƒ/2.0	✓	✓	✓			✓	
Apo Sonnar T✻ 135mm ƒ/2.0	✓		✓				

ZE lenses fit the Canon EF lens mount. They feature electronic contacts allowing for focus-confirmation, and electric aperture operation as with standard Canon EF lenses.

ZF series lenses fit the Nikon F-mount. Four design variations are designated ZF, ZF.2, ZF-I, and ZF-IR. All are manual-focus designs with Nikon AI-S type aperture indexing.

- ZF lenses have AI-S aperture indexing, half-stop aperture ring detents, and no electronic features.
- ZF.2 lenses are like ZF lenses, with the addition CPU functionality, similar to Nikon AI-P lenses. They allow electronic focus confirmation, full metering compatibility, and electronic aperture control with Nikon SLR cameras which require CPU lenses.
- ZF-I lenses feature mechanical locks for focus and aperture, and additional environmental sealing, for industrial applications.
- ZF-IR lenses are adapted to infrared imaging, with coatings that transmit wavelengths up to 1100 nm, and focus scales marked for infrared.

ZK lenses fit the Pentax K-mount. They have no electronics, are manual focus only, K_{A} couplers. Zeiss announced the discontinuation of the ZK line in September 2010.

ZS lenses fit the M42 lens mount (Pentacon/Practica/Pentax screw mount). By use of mount adapters they can be adapted to most 35 mm bayonet camera mounts including Canon FD and EF, Pentax K, Minolta SR and Sony/Konica Minolta/Minolta A mounts (with the exception of Nikon F mount), usually losing open-aperture-metering, multi-segment metering, focus confirmation, automatic flash zoom capabilities as well as some built-in shake reduction performance and Exif data accuracy.

=== Otus lenses ===
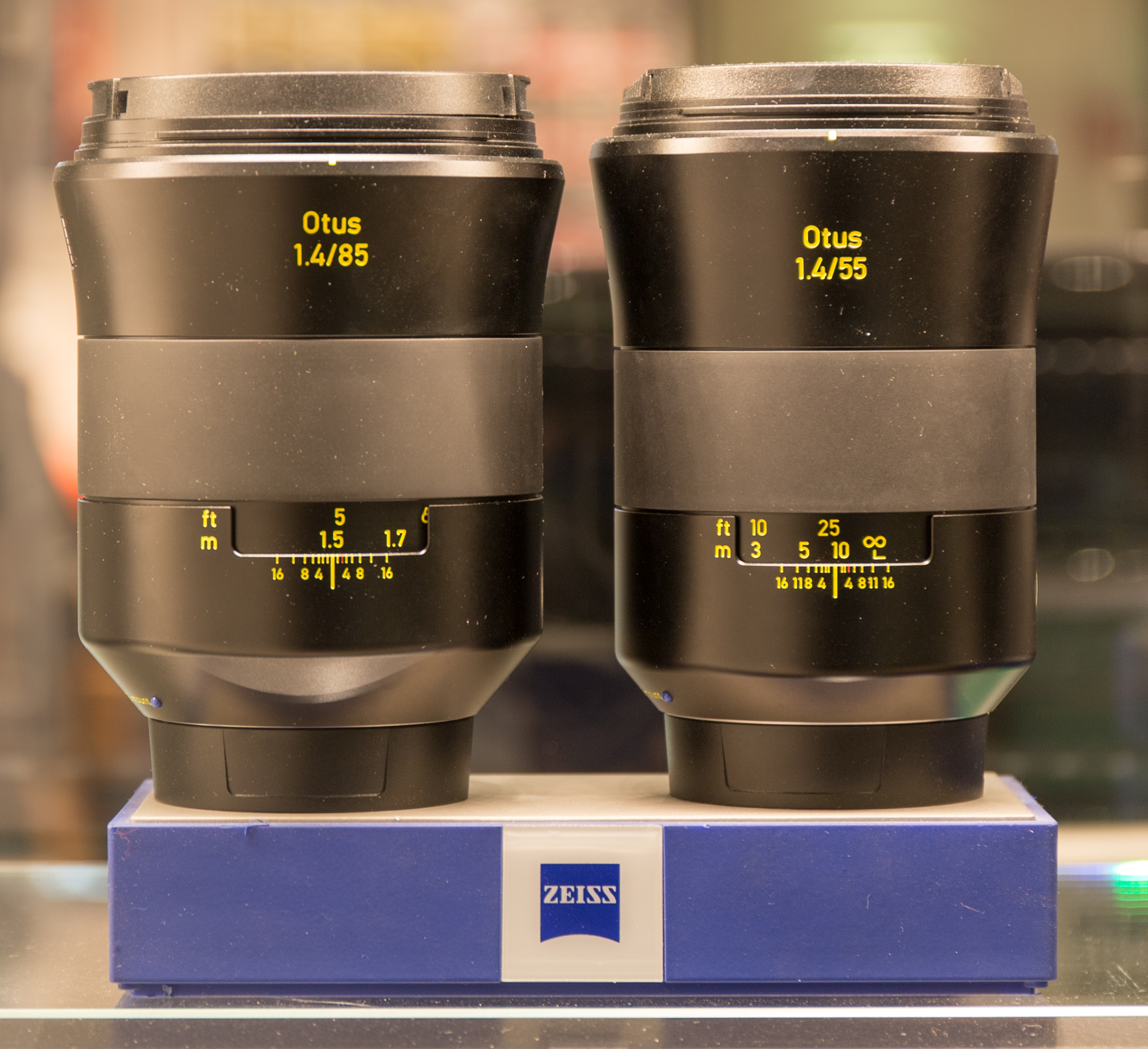
Zeiss Otus 55mm & 85mm ƒ/1.4 lens

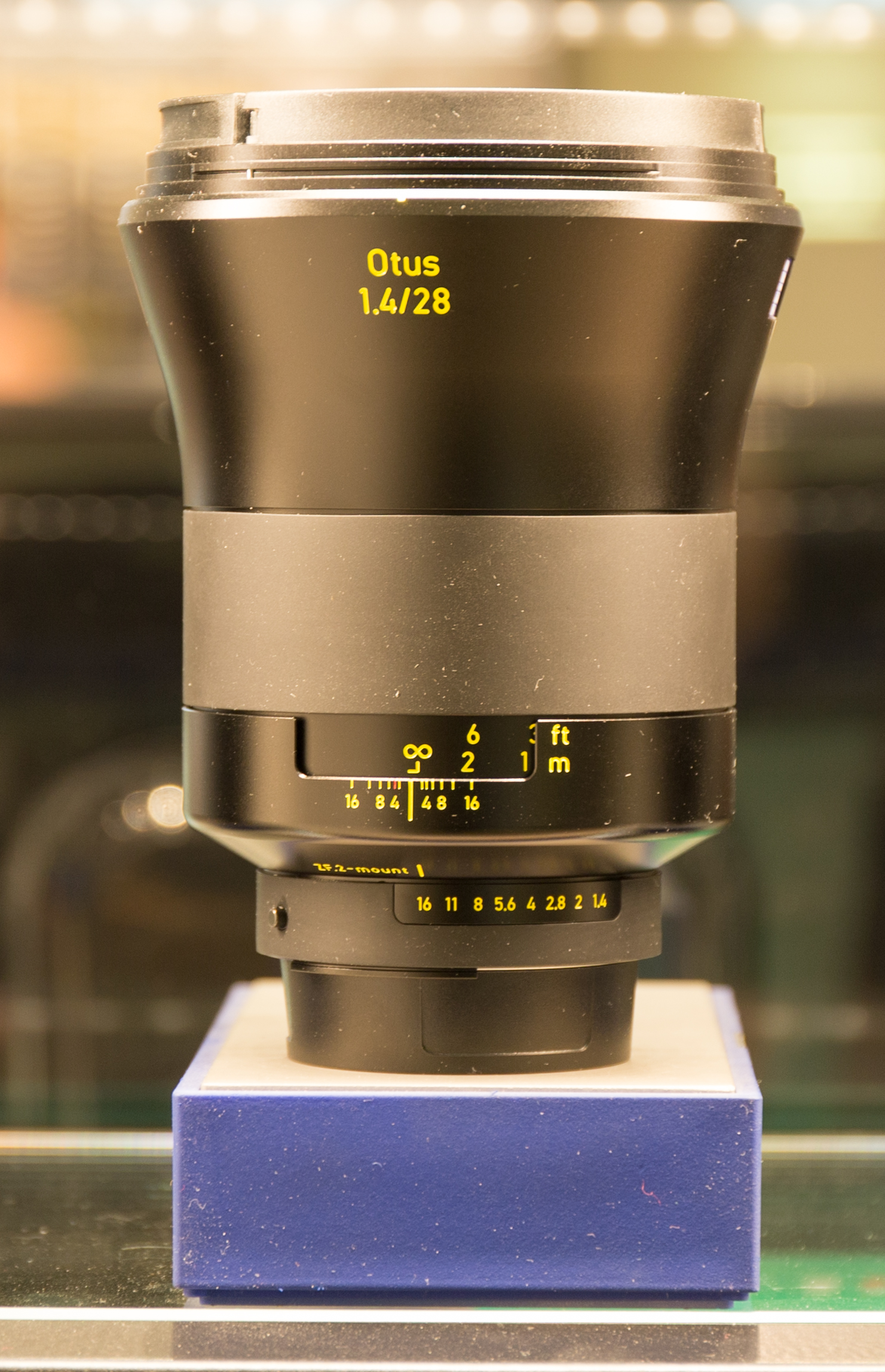
Zeiss Otus 28mm ƒ/1.4 lens

Zeiss produces manual focus Otus lenses for the Nikon F-mount and Canon EF mount, with electronic features equivalent to Zeiss ZF.2 and ZE lenses respectively. Otus lenses are complex no-compromise designs which Zeiss refers to as the "best in the world" in the normal lens and short telephoto categories. They cover the 35 mm format.

- Otus APO-Distagon T✻ 28mm ƒ/1.4
- Otus APO-Distagon T✻ 55mm ƒ/1.4
- Otus APO-Planar T✻ 85mm ƒ/1.4
- Otus APO-Sonnar T✻ 100mm ƒ/1.4

=== Batis lenses ===
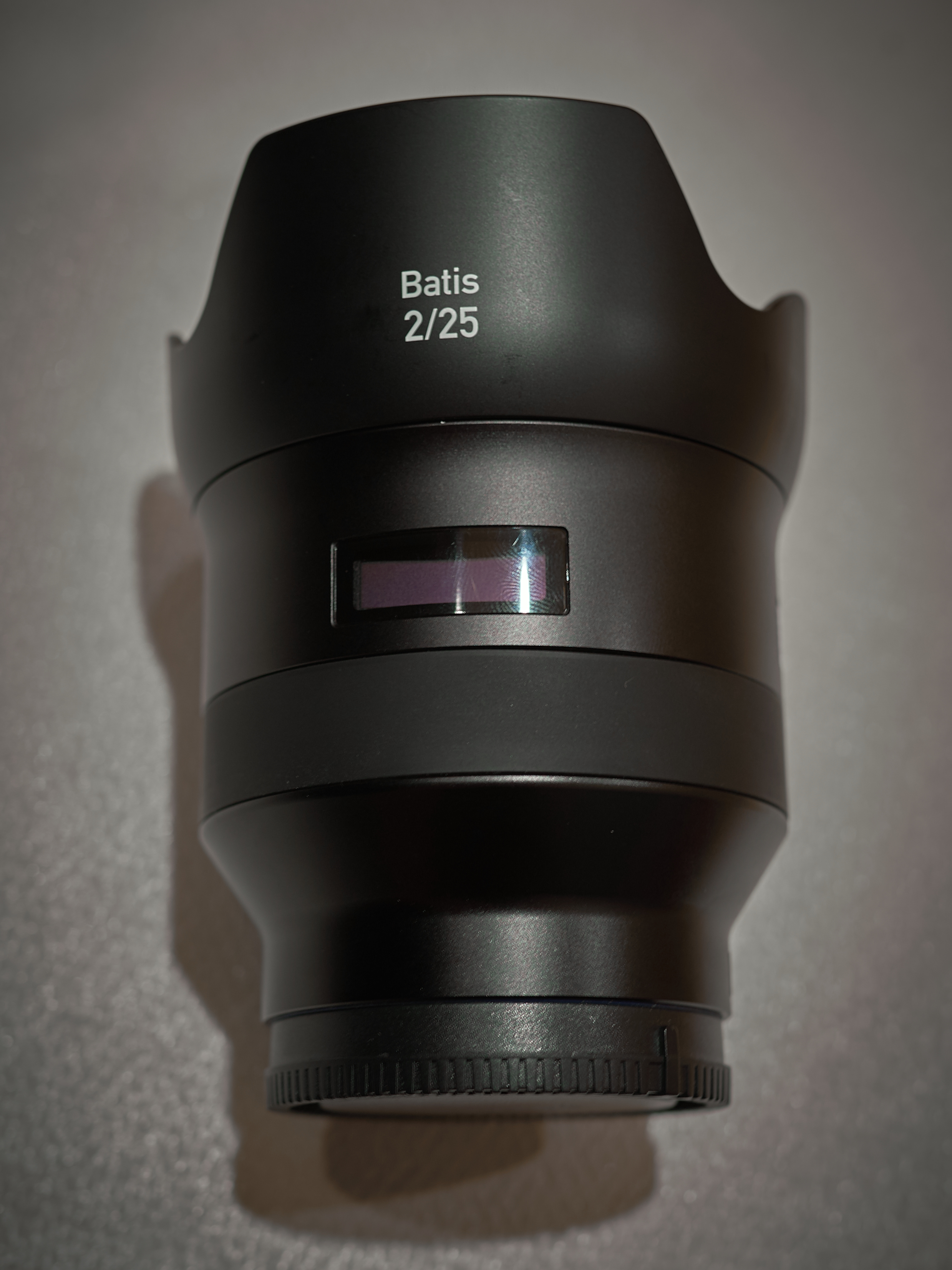
Zeiss Batis ƒ/2.0 25 mm

Zeiss produces autofocus Batis lenses for the Sony E-mount. Like Sony "FE" lenses, they cover the 35mm format.

- Batis Distagon T✻ 18mm f/2.8
- Batis Distagon T✻ 25mm f/2
- Batis Distagon T✻ 40mm f/2 Close-Focus
- Batis Sonnar T✻ 85mm f/1.8
- Batis Sonnar T✻ 135mm f/2.8

=== Loxia lenses ===
Zeiss produces manual focus Loxia lenses for the Sony E-mount. Like Sony "FE" lenses, they cover the 35mm format. The 35/2 and 50/2 are carried over from the existing ZM line.

- Loxia Distagon T✻ 21mm f/2.8
- Loxia Distagon T✻ 25mm f/2.4
- Loxia Biogon T✻ 35mm f/2.0
- Loxia Planar T✻ 50mm f/2.0
- Loxia Sonnar T✻ 85mm f/2.4

=== Touit lenses ===
Zeiss produces autofocus Touit lenses for the Fujifilm X-mount and Sony E-mount. They cover the APS-C format.

- Touit 1.8/32
- Touit Distagon T✻ 12mm f/2.8
- Touit Planar T✻ 32mm f/1.8
- Touit Makro Planar T✻ 50mm f/2.8 Macro

=== Milvus lenses ===
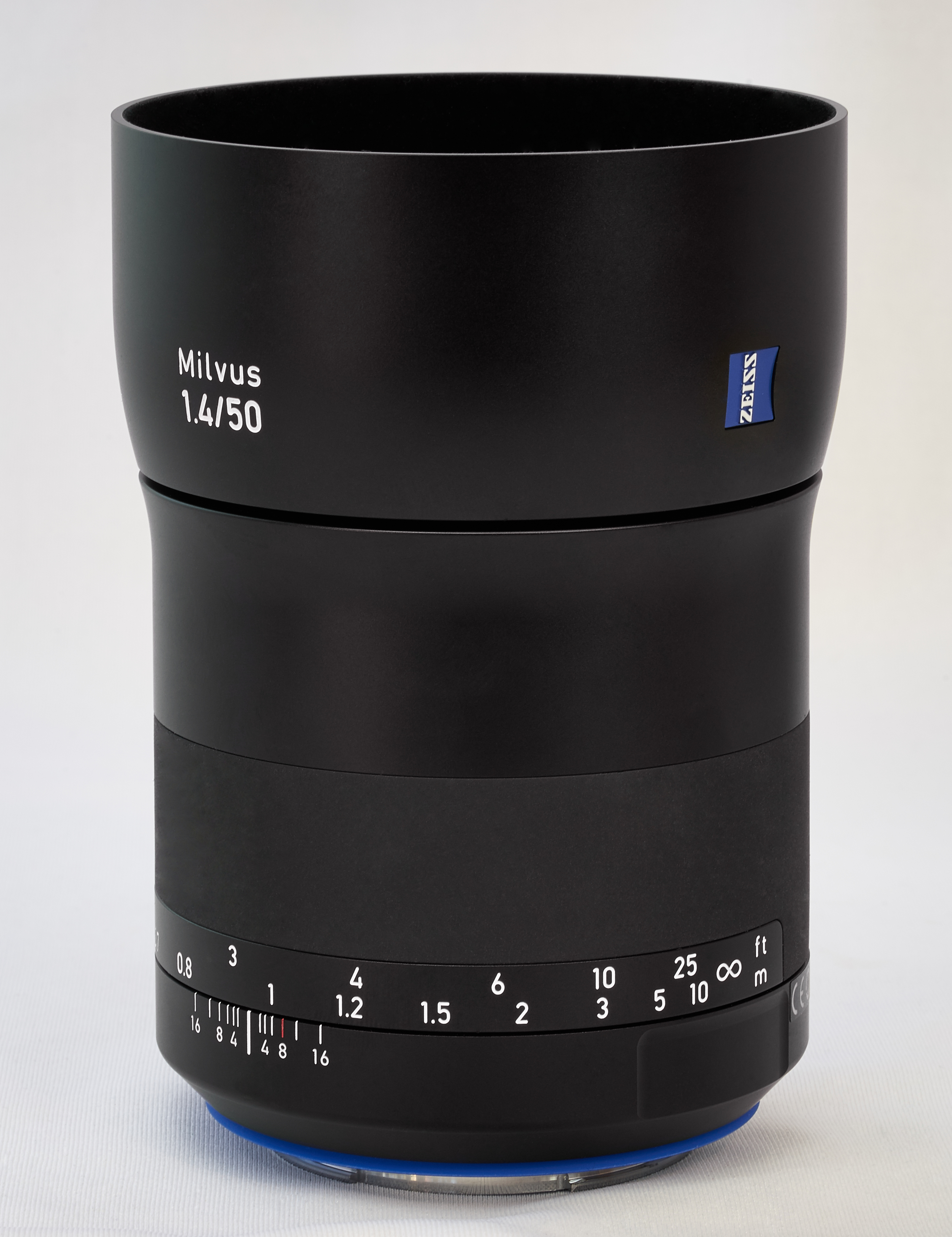
Zeiss Milvus ƒ/1.4 50 mm

Zeiss produces manual focus Milvus lenses for the Nikon F-mount (ZF.2) and Canon EF lens mount (ZE), covering the 35mm format. The 15/2.8, 21/2.8, 35/2, 50/2, 100/2, and 135/2 are carried over from the previous Z-series (now referred to as Zeiss Classic).

- Milvus Distagon T✻ 15mm ƒ/2.8
- Milvus Distagon T✻ 18mm ƒ/2.8
- Milvus Distagon T✻ 21mm ƒ/2.8
- Milvus Distagon T✻ 25mm ƒ/1.4
- Milvus Distagon T✻ 35mm ƒ/1.4
- Milvus Distagon T✻ 35mm ƒ/2
- Milvus Distagon T✻ 50mm ƒ/1.4
- Milvus Makro-Planar T✻ 50mm ƒ/2
- Milvus Planar T✻ 85mm ƒ/1.4
- Milvus Makro-Planar T✻ 100mm ƒ/2
- Milvus APO-Sonnar T✻ 135mm ƒ/2

=== Super-rotator lenses ===
These are 360° tilt/shift lenses (based on Zeiss medium format lens designs) for 35 mm format including full-frame digital. Available mounts: Canon EF, Nikon F, Sony Alpha/Konica Minolta/Minolta A mount. Other mounts on request. Manual focus only, no electronics. Manufactured in Germany and Ukraine.

- Hartblei Superrotator Carl Zeiss Distagon T✻ IF 1:4.0 40 mm
- Hartblei Superrotator Carl Zeiss Planar T✻ 1:2.8 80 mm
- Hartblei Superrotator Carl Zeiss Makro-Planar T✻ 1:4.0 120 mm

=== NASA ===
Zeiss designed the optical components for the James Webb Space Telescope.

A unique triplet of ultra-fast 50 mm f/0.7 lenses originally created by Zeiss for NASA's lunar program had the distinction of being reused by Stanley Kubrick in the filming of his historical drama Barry Lyndon. The period atmosphere of the film demanded that several indoor scenes be filmed by candlelight. To facilitate this, Kubrick had the lenses modified to mount onto a cinema camera and two of them subsequently further modified in separate ways to give wider angles of view.

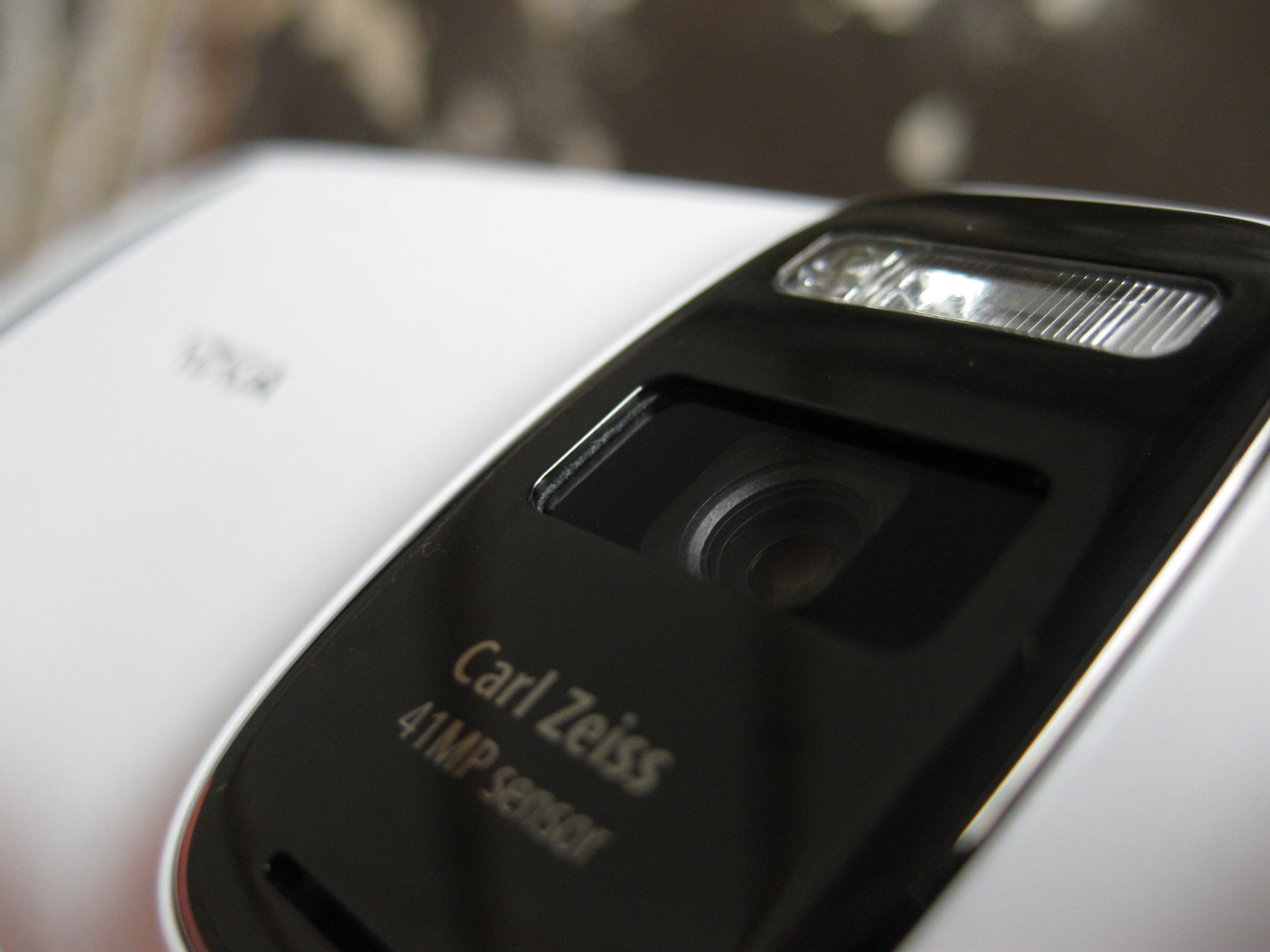
Nokia 808 PureView with Zeiss lens

=== Smartphone lenses ===
Zeiss worked with Nokia, and later with Microsoft Mobile as they continued production of the Lumia series. The Nokia 808 PureView features a lens custom-developed by Zeiss for its 1/1.2 inch sensor; as did its successor, the Nokia Lumia 1020. The Nokia N90 and Nokia N8 also used Zeiss optics. In 2017, Zeiss again provided optics for Nokia products through a collaboration with HMD Global, beginning with the Nokia 8.

=== ZA lenses ===
ZA ("Zeiss Alpha") lenses are designed and manufactured by Sony in Japan, and co-branded with the Zeiss name. Sony and Zeiss collaboratively set design and quality parameters for ZA lenses.

- A-mount ZA-lenses fit the Sony Alpha/Konica Minolta/Minolta A-mount system. They are fully dedicated autofocus lenses with eight electrical contacts, ROM-IC, and distance encoder ("(D)-function" to support ADI flash). All except for the DT lens are full-frame lenses.
  - Sony α Carl Zeiss Distagon T✻ 1:2 24 mm ZA SSM (SAL-24F20Z)
  - Sony α Carl Zeiss Planar T✻ 1:1.4 50 mm ZA SSM (SAL-50F14Z)
  - Sony α Carl Zeiss Planar T✻ 1:1.4 85 mm ZA (SAL-85F14Z)
  - Sony α Carl Zeiss Sonnar T✻ 1:1.8 135 mm ZA (SAL-135F18Z)
  - Sony α Carl Zeiss Vario-Sonnar T✻ 1:2.8 16–35 mm ZA SSM (SAL-1635Z)
  - Sony α Zeiss Vario-Sonnar T✻ 1:2.8 16–35 mm ZA SSM II (SAL-1635Z2)
  - Sony α Carl Zeiss Vario-Sonnar T✻ DT 1:3.5–1:4.5 16–80 mm ZA (SAL-1680Z)
  - Sony α Carl Zeiss Vario-Sonnar T✻ 1:2.8 24–70 mm ZA SSM (SAL-2470Z)
  - Sony α Zeiss Vario-Sonnar T✻ 1:2.8 24–70 mm ZA SSM II (SAL-2470Z2)
- E-mount ZA-lenses are fully dedicated Sony E-mount autofocus lenses. Lenses carrying the E designation cover the APS-C format, while lenses designated FE cover 35mm format.
  - Sony α Carl Zeiss Sonnar T✻ E 1:1.8 24 mm ZA (SEL-24F18Z)
  - Sony α Zeiss Distagon T✻ FE 1:1.4 35 mm ZA (SEL-35F14Z)
  - Sony α Carl Zeiss Sonnar T✻ FE 1:2.8 35 mm ZA (SEL-35F28Z)
  - Sony α Zeiss Planar T✻ FE 1:1.4 50 mm ZA (SEL-50F14Z)
  - Sony α Carl Zeiss Sonnar T✻ FE 1:1.8 55 mm ZA (SEL-55F18Z)
  - Sony α Zeiss Vario-Tessar T✻ FE 1:4 16–35 mm ZA OSS (SEL-1635Z)
  - Sony α Carl Zeiss Vario-Tessar T✻ E 1:4 16–70 mm ZA OSS (SEL-1670Z)
  - Sony α Carl Zeiss Vario-Tessar T✻ FE 1:4 24–70 mm ZA OSS (SEL-2470Z)

In addition to these Sony collaboration lenses, Zeiss offers Touit (APS-C format), Loxia (35mm format) and Batis (35mm format) lenses for E-mount.

== Other products ==
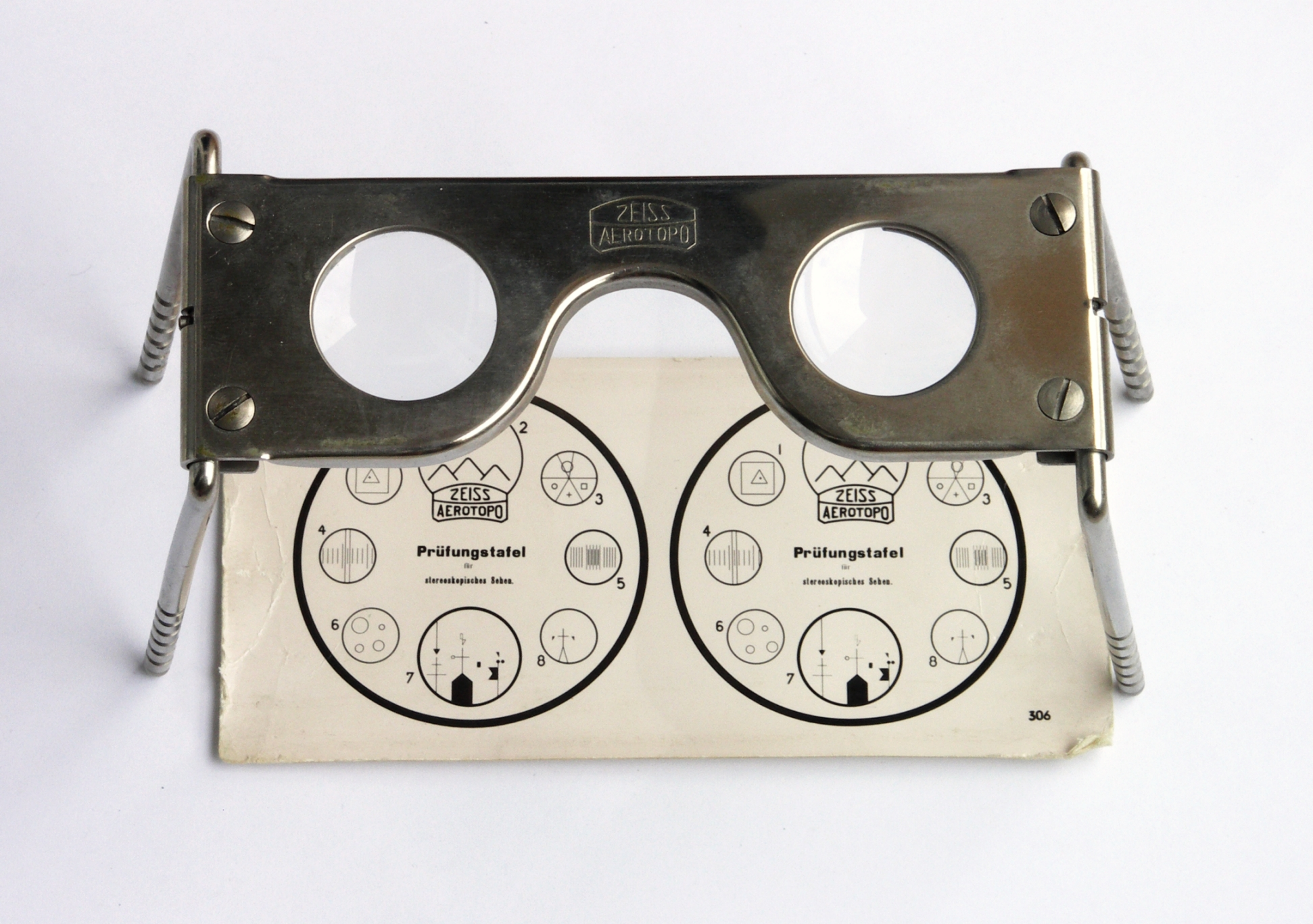
Zeiss pocket stereoscope

Zeiss offers a wide range of products related to optics and vision. These include camera and cine lenses, microscopes and microscopy software, binoculars and spotting scopes, eyeglasses and lenses, planetariums and dome video-systems, optical sensors, industrial metrology systems and ophthalmology products. Even video glasses belong to the product range. In the summer of 2012, the new video glasses Cinemizer OLED were to come on the market. In addition to the viewing of 2D and 3D movies, it will be possible to play computer games when fitted with the equipment.

The largest part of Carl Zeiss AG's revenue is generated by its Semiconductor Manufacturing Technologies division, which produces lithographic systems for the semiconductor industry, as well as process control solutions (electron microscopes, mask repair tools, helium ion microscopes).

=== Sports optics ===
Carl Zeiss Sports Optics division produces rifle telescopic sights, spotting scopes, binoculars, and distance measuring devices for outdoors enthusiasts. The three main product lines are the Conquest line, which is manufactured in Germany and assembled in the United States, and Victory line, which is produced entirely in Germany, and the Terra line, which is made in Asia.

Since 2019 the following Zeiss sport optics products series are in production:

=== Binoculars ===
- Terra
- Conquest HD
- SFL
- Victory HT
- Victory SF
- Victory RF range finding binoculars
- 20 x 60 T* S

=== Spotting scopes ===
- Dialyt
- Conquest Gavia
- Victory Harpia

=== Rifle scopes ===
- Conquest V4
- Conquest V6
- Victory HT
- Victory V8

=== Medical solutions ===
This branch of Carl Zeiss is managed by Carl Zeiss Meditec. It is divided in Ophthalmology/Optometry, Neurosurgery, ENT, Spine, P&R, Dentistry, Radiotherapy and Gynecology.

=== Vision care ===
Carl Zeiss Vision Care division develops, manufactures and distributes ophthalmic lenses, optical coatings, and dispensary technologies and services. Zeiss is known for ophthalmic lenses made from high refractive index glass, allowing stronger prescription lenses to be thinner.

Their progressive lens ZEISS Progressive Individual has won multiple awards including the OLA awards in 2009 presented at Washington, D.C., and the VisionPlus or VP Awards in 2014 at Mumbai, India.

=== Industrial metrology ===
Zeiss Industrial Metrology specializes in high-accuracy measurement systems, including coordinate-measuring machines (CMMs), computed tomography measurement machines (non-medical), optical measuring equipment, metrology software and measurement sensor systems. The Industrial Metrology subsidiary provides this equipment to a wide range of manufacturing facilities worldwide.

Zeiss has manufactured coordinate measuring machines since 1919, offering very basic manually operated CMMs. In 1973, Zeiss introduced the UMM 500, using a Zeiss sensor system and Hewlett-Packard computer. Zeiss has since vastly improved and diversified their product line and now feature many high accuracy CMMs, the Metrotom, a CT x-ray scanning measuring machine, with the ability to quickly and completely measure a part in 3 dimensions without ever touching the part, and the O-INSPECT, a combination optical-tactile measurement machine.

Zeiss is currently a member of the International Association of CMM Manufacturers (IACMM).

Many of the sensor systems produced by Zeiss are proprietary technologies, using technologies exclusively patented by Zeiss, and therefore can offer better accuracy and repeatability than its competitors.

Zeiss was the first manufacturer of coordinate measurement machines to introduce computer numerical control (CNC) technology to a coordinate measurement machine and was the first company to offer CNC stylus changer capability for these machines.

=== Semiconductor manufacturing technology ===
Carl Zeiss SMT systems for DUV and EUV electromagnetic radiation are used in chip-lithography machines for focusing the extremely short wavelengths. Together with the company ASML and its subsidiaries and partners Zeiss is the sole supplier of the lithography systems that are able to manufacture core layers of the latest semiconductor chips.

=== Microscopes ===
Zeiss offers different types of microscopes:

- Optical microscopes (LMs)
- Laser scanning microscopes (LSMs)
- Scanning electron microscopes (SEMs)
- Scanning helium ion microscopes (SHIMs)
- X-ray Microscopes (XRMs)

=== Fire doors ===
The name Zeiss Ikon can also be found in old cinemas, on fire shutters of the projection windows. They had heat fuses that melted and dropped the shutter over the hole if the film caught fire in the projection booth.

== See also ==
- Carl Pulfrich
- Telescopic sight
- Walther Bauersfeld
- Zeiss projector
- Internationale Camera Actiengesellschaft
