= Cooke triplet =

Patented photographic lens system designed by Dennis Taylor

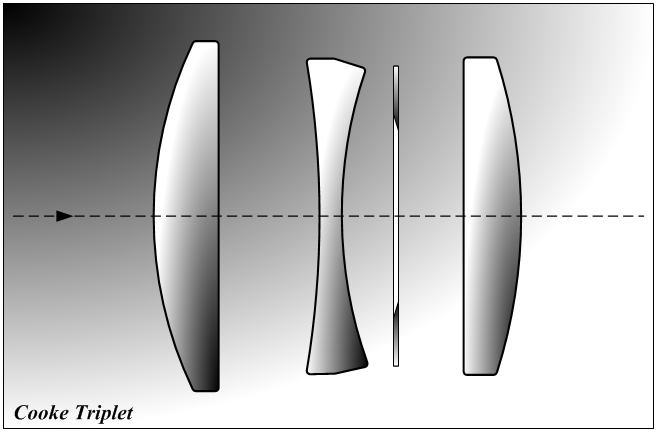
- Introduced in: 1893
- Author: Dennis Taylor
- Construction: 3 elements in 3 groups
- Aperture: f/3.5 (early) f/2.8 (rare-earth optical glass)

The Cooke triplet is a photographic lens designed and patented in 1893 by Dennis Taylor who was employed as chief engineer by T. Cooke & Sons of York. It was the first lens system that allowed the elimination of most of the optical distortion or aberration at the outer edge of the image.

The Cooke triplet is noted for being able to correct the five Seidel aberrations. The compound lens design consists of three air-spaced simple lens elements: two biconvex (positive) lenses surrounding a biconcave (negative) lens in the middle. It is one of the most important objective designs in the history of photography.

== Design ==
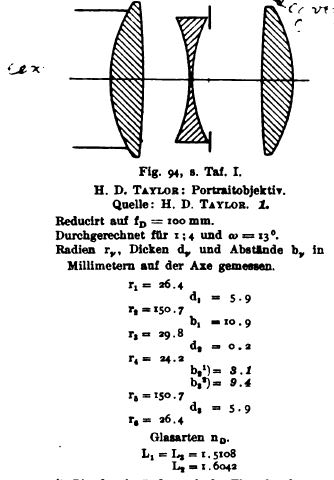
Cooke triplet

According to Taylor, the lens design was derived by considering a cemented achromatic doublet consisting of one thin negative element and one thin positive element, both of equal power; such a doublet would result in a compound lens with zero net power but also a flat field of focus. (Note: The field of focus is expressed by the Petzval field curvature, also known as Petzval sum. This was defined by the mathematician Joseph Petzval as the sum of the product of the radii of curvature and refractive index for each lens element.) However, by separating the elements, the resulting air gap would act as an additional lens element, giving the system a positive overall power while retaining the flat-field characteristic. To correct the oblique aberrations, Taylor recommended splitting one element and mounting them on either side of the remaining element; although he patented versions in which either the negative or positive element was split, in his preferred embodiment, he split the positive element.

A Cooke triplet comprises a negative flint glass element in the centre with a positive crown glass element on each side. In this design, the Petzval sum is zero, so the field of focus is flat. In other words, the negative lens can be as strong as the outer two combined, when one measures in dioptres, yet the lens will converge light, because the rays strike the middle element close to the optical axis. The curvature of field is determined by the sum of the dioptres, but the focal length is not.

=== Impact and production ===
At the time, the Cooke triplet was a major advancement in lens design. For one wavelength, the design can correct, using only three elements, spherical aberration, coma, astigmatism, field curvature, and distortion. However, Kingslake noted "there is no symmetry to help the designer, and there is no control over distortion", leading to a trial-and-error design process. It was surpassed by later designs in high-end cameras, including the double Gauss design, but is still widely used in inexpensive cameras, including variations using aspheric elements, particularly in cell-phone cameras.

The Cooke triplet consists of three separated lenses positioned at the finite distance. It is often considered that the triplet is one of the most important discoveries in the field of photographic objectives

— The Cooke triplet optimizations (2002)

T. Cooke & Sons were reluctant to manufacture the lens, possibly because of the difficulty in grinding the strong central negative element, and the design was licensed to Taylor, Taylor and Hobson, who named the product the Cooke triplet.

Starting from the early 1900s, the Cooke triplet was adopted by other major optical lens manufacturers and were produced for many decades.

- Agfa Agnar, Apotar
- Argus Cintar
- Corfield Lumar
- Enna Ennagon
- ISCO Iscotar
- Kodak Anaston
- E.Ludwig Meritar, (Note: Entry-level normal lens offered for Ihagee Exakta SLR cameras.) Victar
- Meyer Optik Domiplan, Trioplan
- Piesker Piconar
- Plaubel Anticomar (early) (Note: After c. 1932–35, a fourth element was added to Anticomar lenses, making them more similar to Tessar designs.)
- Rodenstock Eurygon, Trinar
- Schacht Travegar
- Schneider Kreuznach Radionar
- Steinheil Cassar, Cassarit
- Voigtländer Vaskar, Voigtar
- Zeiss Pantar, Novar-Anastigmat, (Note: Novar lenses were manufactured by Rodenstock or Steinheil for Zeiss Ikon cameras.) Triotar

=== Further development ===
Cooke triplet and derivative design diagrams

Cooke triplet (Taylor, 1893)

Voigtländer Heliar (Harting, 1900)

Voigtländer Dynar (Harting, 1903)

Taylor Hobson Speedic (Lee, 1924)

Ernostar f/2.0 (Bertele, 1924)

Arthur Cox noted that anastigmat lenses were "almost exclusively, the logical development of two main types, the symmetrical lens, and the Cooke triplet of H. D. Taylor." One of the first derivatives was the Voigtländer Heliar, developed by Hans Harting in 1900 as a symmetrical modification of the original Cooke triplet. Harting continued to develop the lens, resulting in the Dynar (1903), whose design was later adopted as a new version of the Heliar after World War I. Anecdotal evidence indicates that a Heliar was used to take official portraits of Emperor Hirohito. Although the contemporary Zeiss Tessar (1902) is said to be a development of the Cooke triplet, it is more accurately considered a parallel development descended from earlier, four-element designs by Paul Rudolph, including the Protar and Unar.

To increase the lens speed, either the rear element was further split into two, as patented by Edward Bausch in 1900 and H.W. Lee as the Speedic in 1924, or a positive meniscus element was inserted into the front air space, as in Ludwig Bertele's enduring Ernostar and Sonnar designs for Ernemann and Carl Zeiss AG, respectively.

Several of the early lenses used with the Leica camera were derived from the Cooke triplet by splitting one or more of the three elements into a cemented doublet, including the Elmar, Elmarit, Hektor, and Thambar.

== Application ==
Binoculars as well as refracting telescopes often use triplets. The same holds for many projection lenses, e.g., for 35 mm slide projectors.

Rudolf Kingslake notes the Hologon is a triplet in which the negative element was split to surround a positive element.

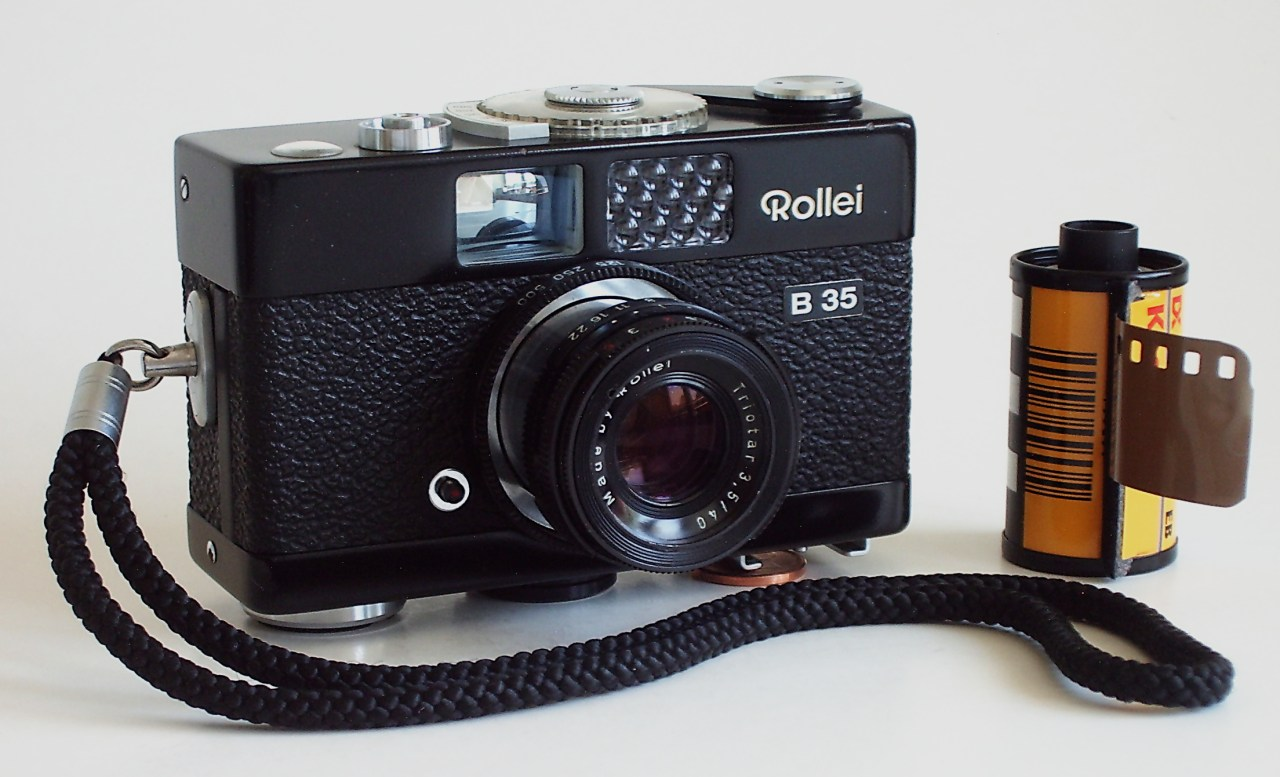
Triotar-Triplet on a Rollei scale-focus camera

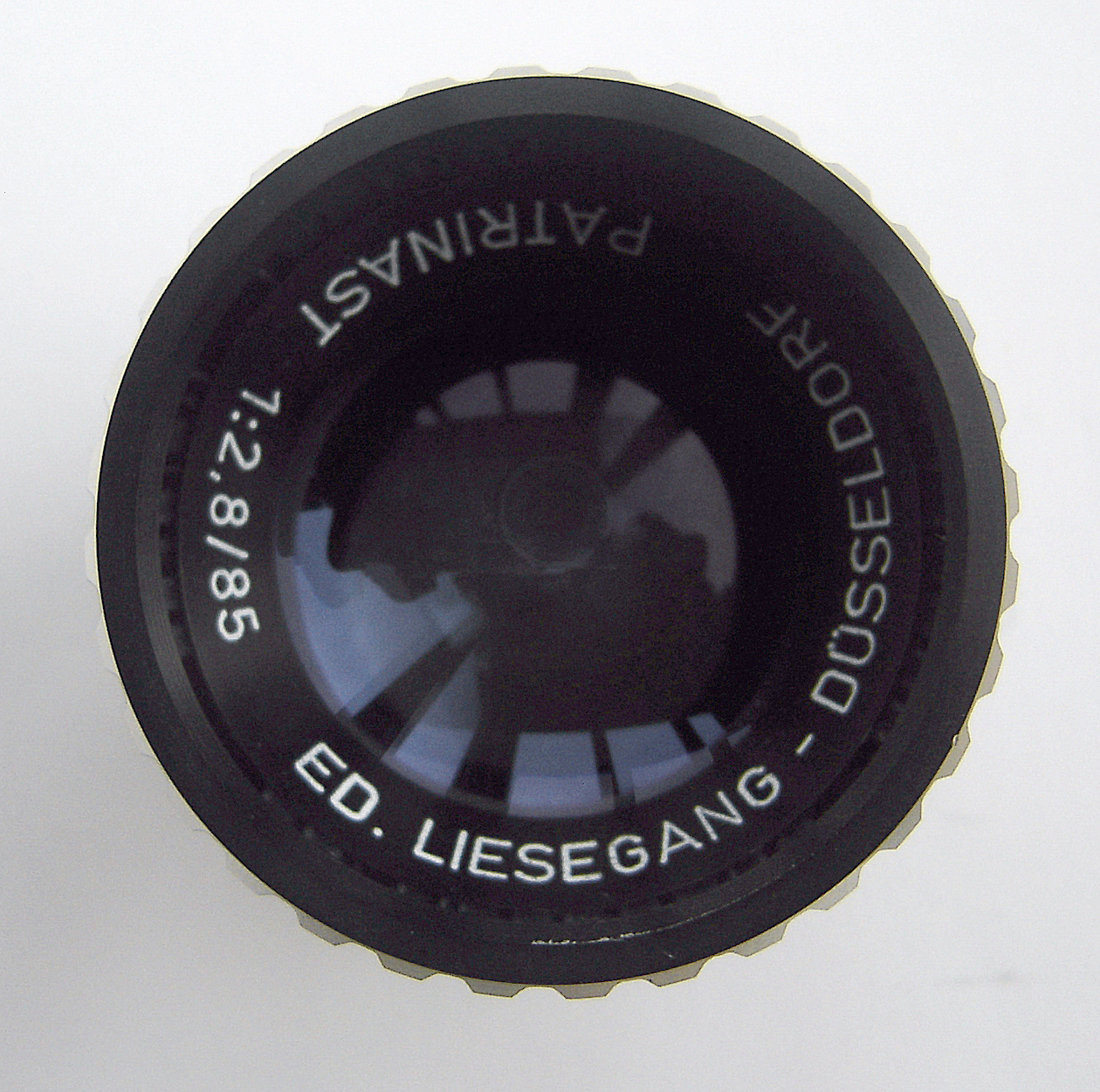
Projection objective Patrinast for a 35 mm slide projector by Ed. Liesegang; 1:2.8/85

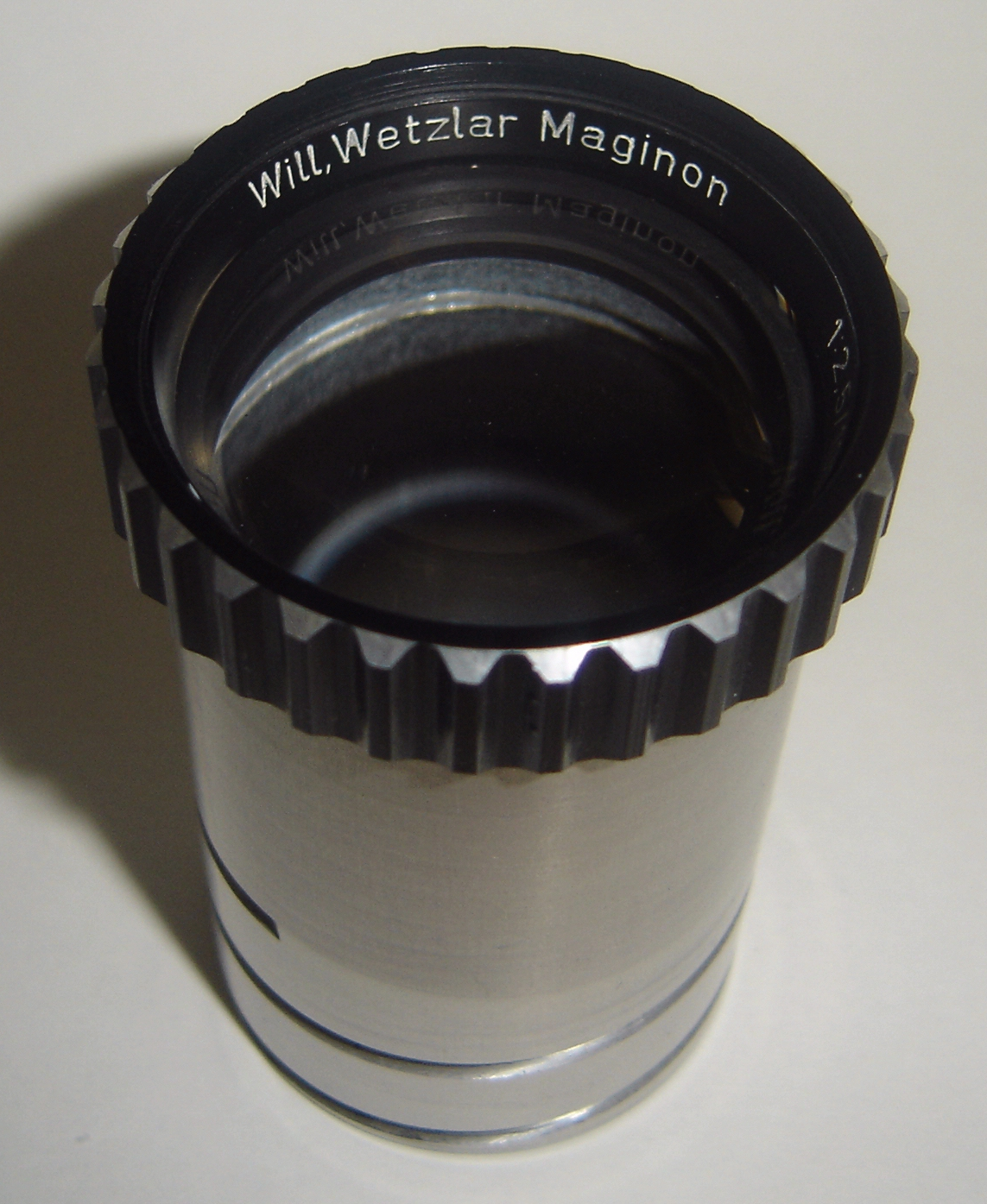
Projection objective Maginon by Wilhelm Will, Wetzlar, 1:2.8/100

The Cooke triplet has provided the basis for additional designs, including a derivative with five lens elements.

== See also ==
- Achromatic lens
- Chromatic aberration
- Triplet lens
