= List of lenses for Hasselblad cameras =

Photographic lenses for Hasselblad cameras have been designed and manufactured by several companies, primarily by Carl Zeiss AG; others include Fujifilm, Kodak, Nittoh, Rodenstock, and Schneider.

== Aerial cameras ==
The first cameras assembled by Victor Hasselblad were supplied to the Swedish Air Force as the ROSS HK-7, which was reverse-engineered from a recovered German camera for aerial reconnaissance, the Handkammer Hk 12,5/7×9. 240 handheld HK-7s were produced between 1941 and 1943. It captures 7×9 cm (2.8×3.5 in) images, giving it a crop factor of 0.38 for 135 film equivalent, and was fitted with one of three non-interchangeable lenses.

Lenses for ROSS HK-7
FL (mm)	Apr.	Mfr.	Name	Construction		Min. Focus	Dimensions			Notes
FL (mm)	Apr.	Mfr.	Name	Ele	Grp	Min. Focus	Φ×L	Wgt.	Filter (mm)	Notes
135	f/2.8	Zeiss	Biotessar	?	?	fixed, ∞	?	?	?	
240	f/4.5–16	Schneider	Xenar	?	?	fixed, ∞	?	?	?	
250	f/4.5–22	Meyer	Tele-Megor	?	?	fixed, ∞	?	?	?	

After testing the HK-7, the Swedish Air Force commissioned Hasselblad to produce another aerial camera, this time mounted to the airplane. Hasselblad produced the Ross SKa 4 and SKa 4a, which both accept interchangeable lenses and film magazines, differing in how the standard (150 mm) lens was stored. Both cameras capture 12×12 cm (4.7×4.7 in) images, giving a crop factor of 0.25.

Lenses for ROSS SKa 4/4a
FL (mm)	Apr.	Mfr.	Name	Construction		Min. Focus	Dimensions			Notes
FL (mm)	Apr.	Mfr.	Name	Ele	Grp	Min. Focus	Φ×L	Wgt.	Filter (mm)	Notes
150	f/4.5	Zeiss	Tessar	?	?	fixed, ∞	?	?	?	
152	f/4.5	Cooke	Aviar	?	?	fixed, ∞	?	?	?	
250	f/3.5	Zeiss	Tele-Tessar	?	?	fixed, ∞	?	?	?	
400	f/5.5	Meyer	Tele-Megor	?	?	fixed, ∞	?	?	?	

The SKa 4/4a were re-engineered for land combat and the resulting camera, the MK 80, featured tripod support and periscope attachments, along with a set of slower shutter speeds. Although the lens mount is physically compatible with the SKa 4/4a, lenses were tested and paired to the camera body, so a lens from a different body may not have the correct focus distance. It captured 7×12 cm (2.8×4.7 in) images, giving a crop factor of 0.31.

Lenses for ROSS MK 80
FL (mm)	Apr.	Mfr.	Name	Construction		Min. Focus	Dimensions			Notes
FL (mm)	Apr.	Mfr.	Name	Ele	Grp	Min. Focus	Φ×L	Wgt.	Filter (mm)	Notes
165	f/4.5–16	Zeiss Jena	Tessar	?	?	fixed, ∞	?	?	?	
320	f/6.3	Zeiss	Tele-Tessar	?	?	fixed, ∞	?	?	?	
600	f/8	Zeiss	Tele-Tessar	?	?	fixed, ∞	?	?	?	

The final cameras assembled by Ross for the Swedish military were labeled as the SKa 5, intended for aerial photogrammetry. Only 24 were built. It captured 18×24 cm (7.1×9.4 in) images, giving a crop factor of 0.14.

Lenses for ROSS SKa 5
FL (mm)	Apr.	Mfr.	Name	Construction		Min. Focus	Dimensions			Notes
FL (mm)	Apr.	Mfr.	Name	Ele	Grp	Min. Focus	Φ×L	Wgt.	Filter (mm)	Notes
250	f/4.5	Zeiss	Orthometar	?	?	fixed, ∞	?	?	?	
250	f/4.5	Zeiss	Tele-Tessar	?	?	fixed, ∞	?	?	?	
500	f/5.6	Zeiss	Tele-Tessar	?	?	fixed, ∞	?	?	?	

== Medium format cameras ==
The traditional Hasselblad medium format film cameras capture images on 120 film in the 6×6 cm (nominal) frame size; the actual frame size measures 56.5×56.5 mm (2.22×2.22 in), which is larger than small format 135 film, with a frame size of 36×24 mm (1.42×0.94 in). This means the crop factor for most film-based Hasselblad cameras (based on diagonal angle of view) compared to "full-frame" 135 is 0.54; for example, a V system lens with a focal length of 80 mm would have the equivalent coverage of a lens with a focal length of approximately 45 mm on a 135 film camera. If the square format images are cropped to an equivalent 3:2 aspect ratio, the resulting 56.5×37.7 mm (2.22×1.48 in) images would have an equivalent focal length multiplier of 0.64, so the 80 mm lens has the equivalent angle of view as a 50 mm lens on a 135 film camera.

=== Lenses for 1600F / 1000F cameras ===
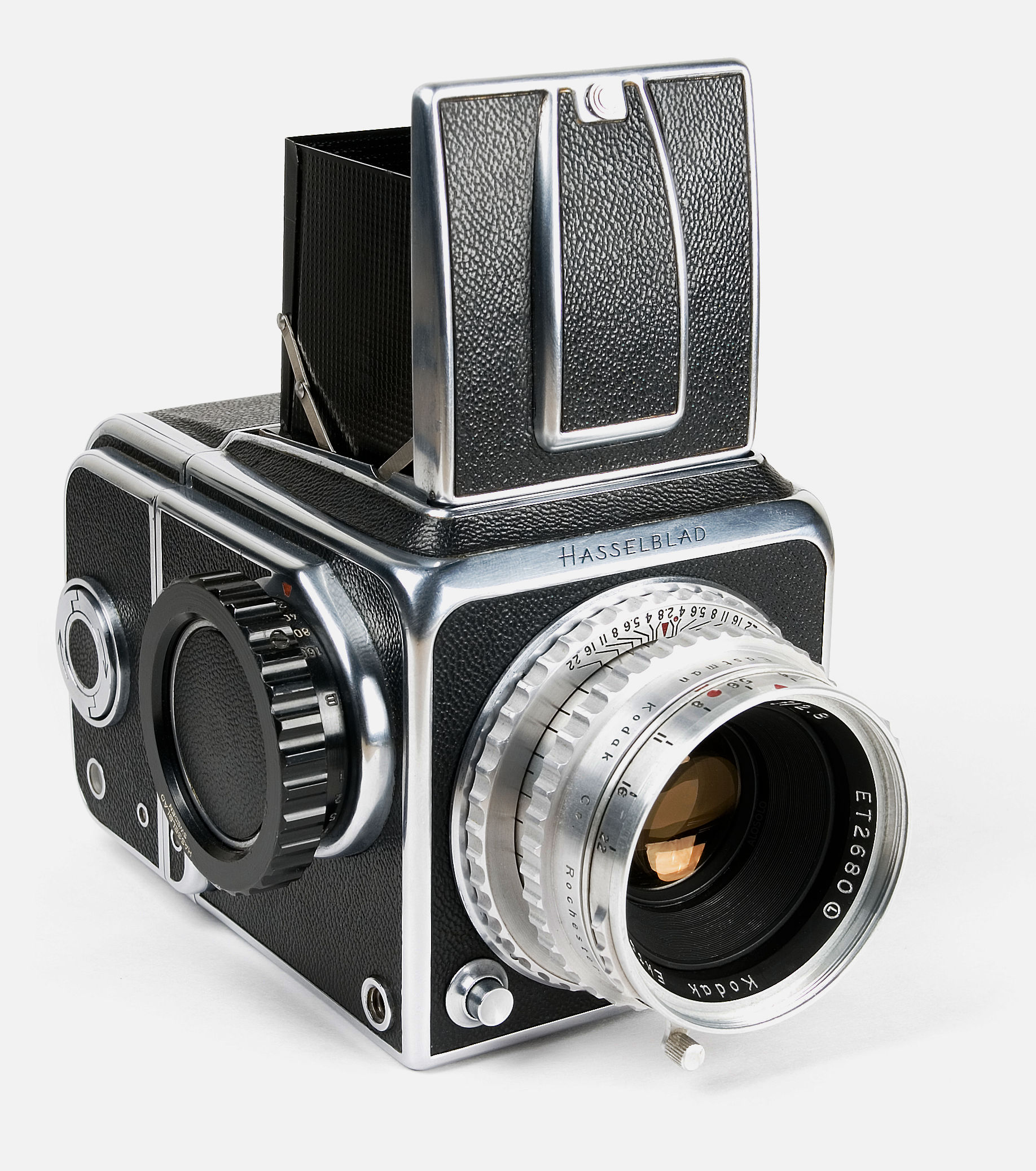
1600F with Kodak Ektar 2.8/80 lens

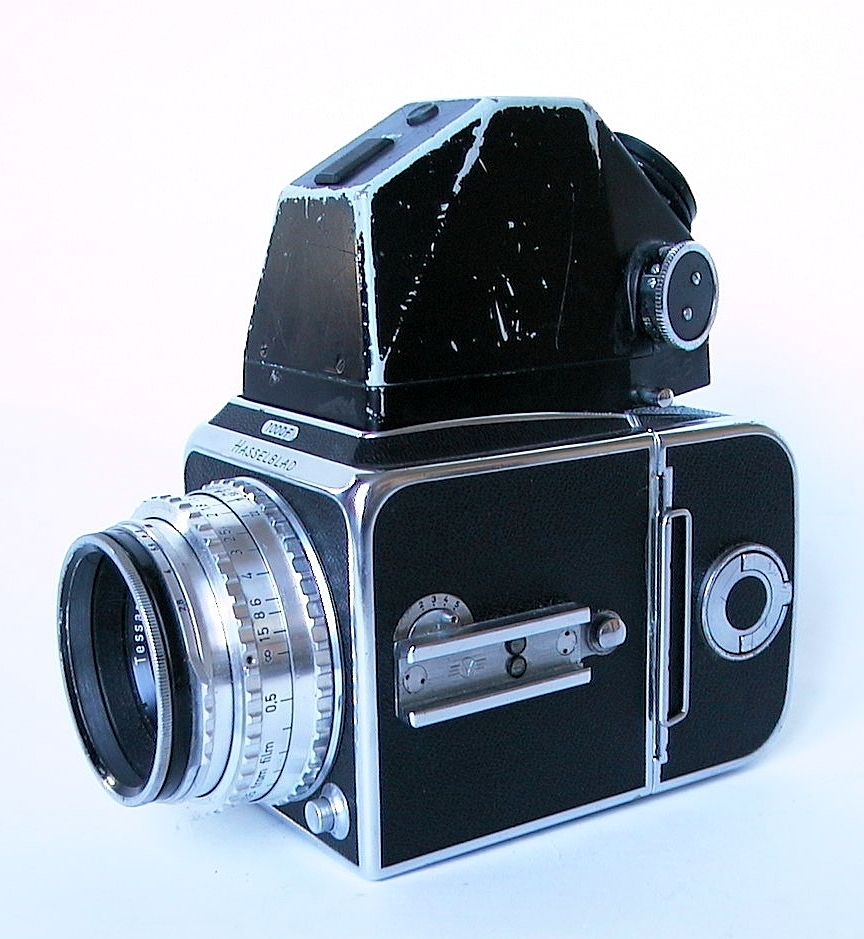
1000F with Zeiss Tessar 2.8/80 lens

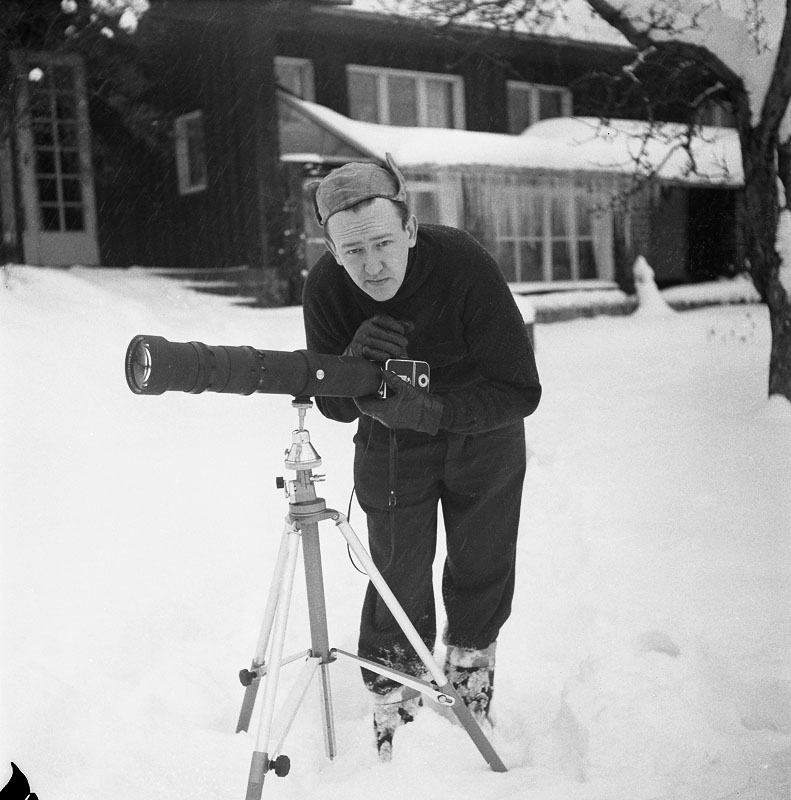
Pål-Nils Nilsson with Cook & Perkins Dallmeyer Dallon Tele-Anastigmat 5.6/500 lens

The original normal lens for the 1600F and 1000F was the Kodak Ektar 80 mm f/2.8. It was succeeded by the Zeiss Tessar in 1953.

Interchangeable lenses for Hasselblad 1600F / 1000F cameras
FL (mm)	Apr.	Mfr.	Name	Construction		Min. Focus	Dimensions			Notes
FL (mm)	Apr.	Mfr.	Name	Ele	Grp	Min. Focus	Φ×L	Wgt.	Filter (mm)	Notes
Ultra wide angle lenses
38	f/4.5	Zeiss	Biogon	8	5	0.5 m (1 1/2 ft)	?	?	63 (Series VIII)	Fitted to original Super Wide camera
Wide angle lenses
55	f/6.3	Kodak	Wide Field Ektar	?	?	1.0 m (3 ft 4 in)	?	?	?	Requires mirror lock-up
60	f/5.6	Zeiss	Distagon	6	4	0.5 m (1 ft 8 in)	47.0×43.5 mm (1.9×1.7 in)	280 g (9.9 oz)	57 (Series VII)	
Normal lenses
80	f/2.8	Zeiss	Tessar	4	3	0.5 m (1 ft 8 in)	47.5×71.5 mm (1.9×2.8 in)	250 g (8.8 oz)	57	
80	f/2.8	Kodak	Ektar	4	3	0.5 m (1 ft 8 in)	?	?	?	
Portrait lenses
135	f/3.5	Zeiss	Sonnar	5	3	0.9 m (3 ft)	74.0×80.5 mm (2.9×3.2 in)	520 g (18 oz)	57 (Series VII)	
135	f/3.5–22	Kodak	Ektar	5	3?	1 m (3 ft 3 in)	?	?	?	
Telephoto lenses
250	f/4	Zeiss	Sonnar	4	3	2.4 m (8 ft)	72.0×163 mm (2.8×6.4 in)	1,100 g (39 oz)	80 (Series IX)	
250	f/5.6–45	Zeiss	Sonnar	4	3	2.4 m (8 ft)	?	?	(Series VII)	
254	f/5.6	Kodak	Ektar	?	?	2.2 m (7 ft 4 in)	?	?	?	
508	f/5.6	Cook & Perkins	Dallmeyer Dallon Tele-Anastigmat	?	?	9.1 m (30 ft)	?	?	100	

=== Lenses for V system cameras ===
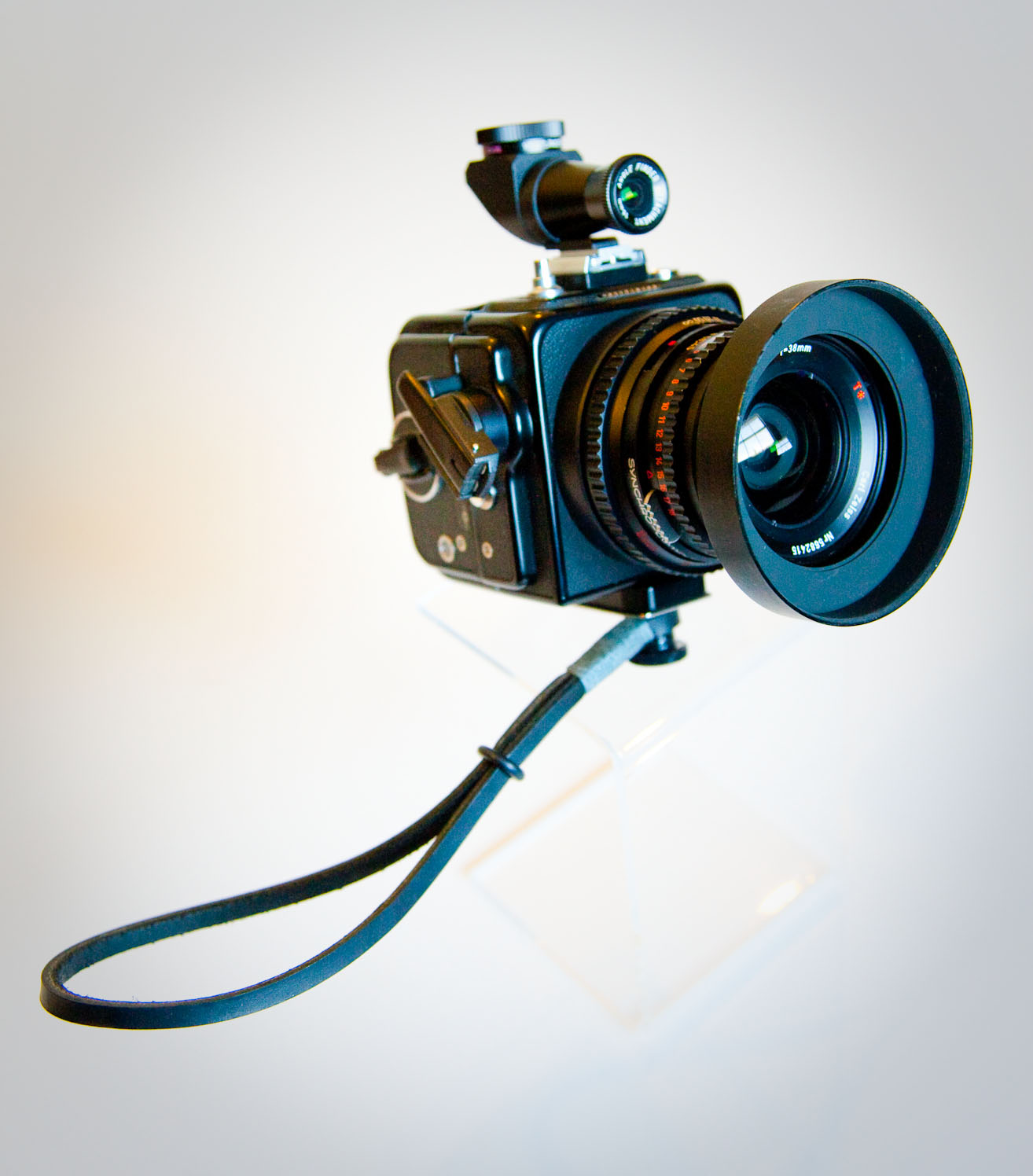
SWC with Zeiss Biogon 4.5/38 (C black barrel, T*)

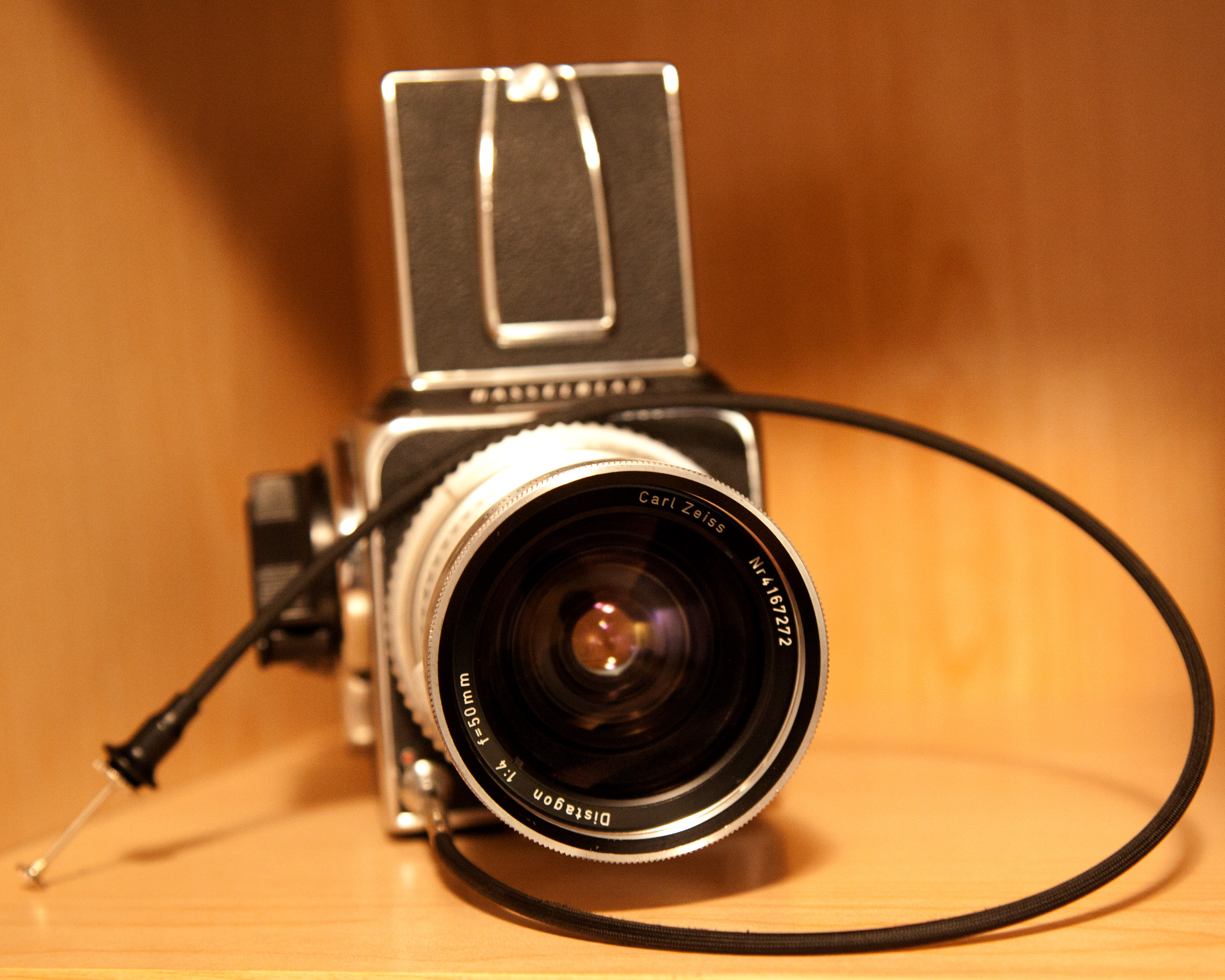
Zeiss Distagon 4/50 (C chrome barrel, not multicoated)

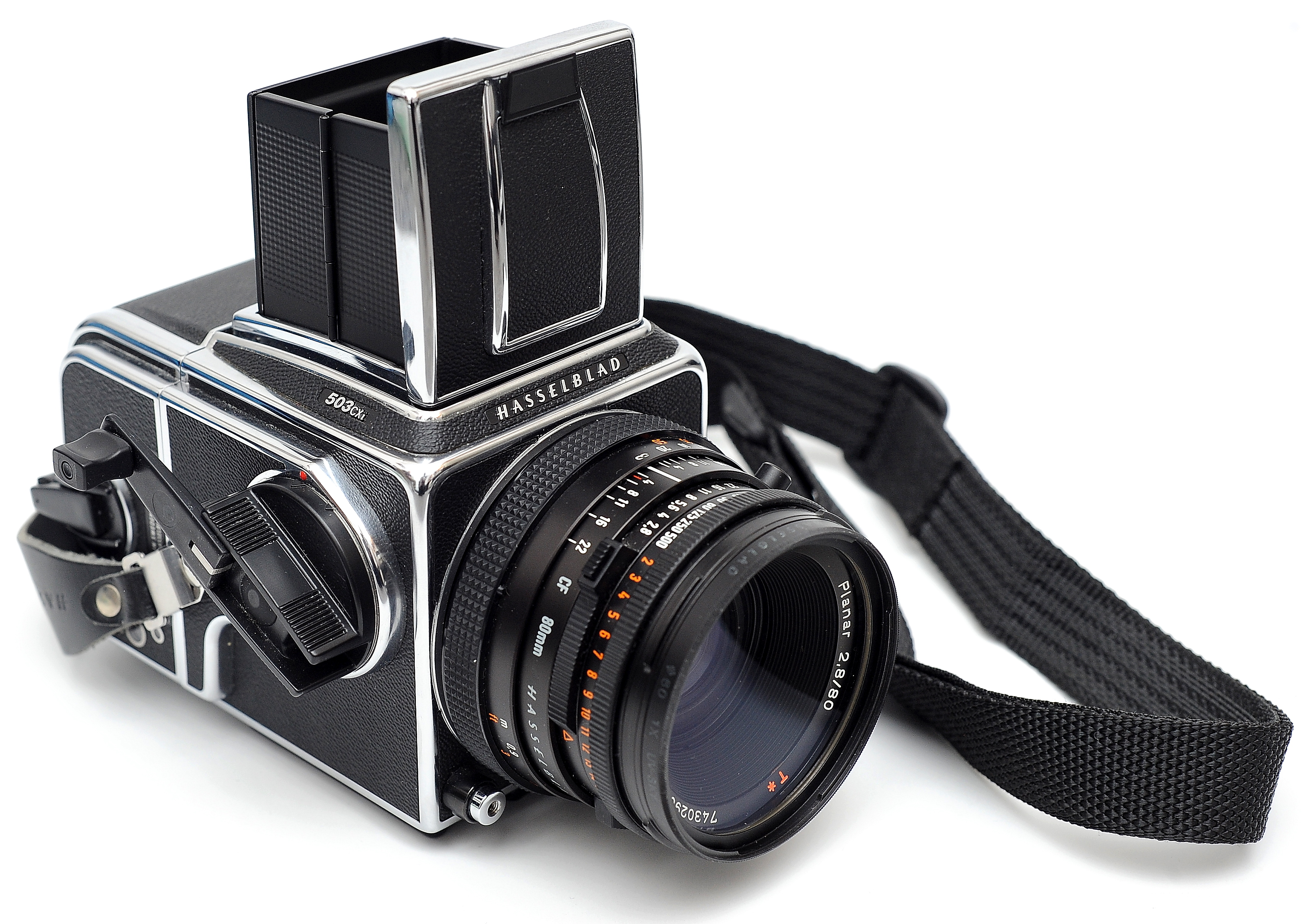
503 with Zeiss Planar 2.8/80 (CF black barrel, T*)

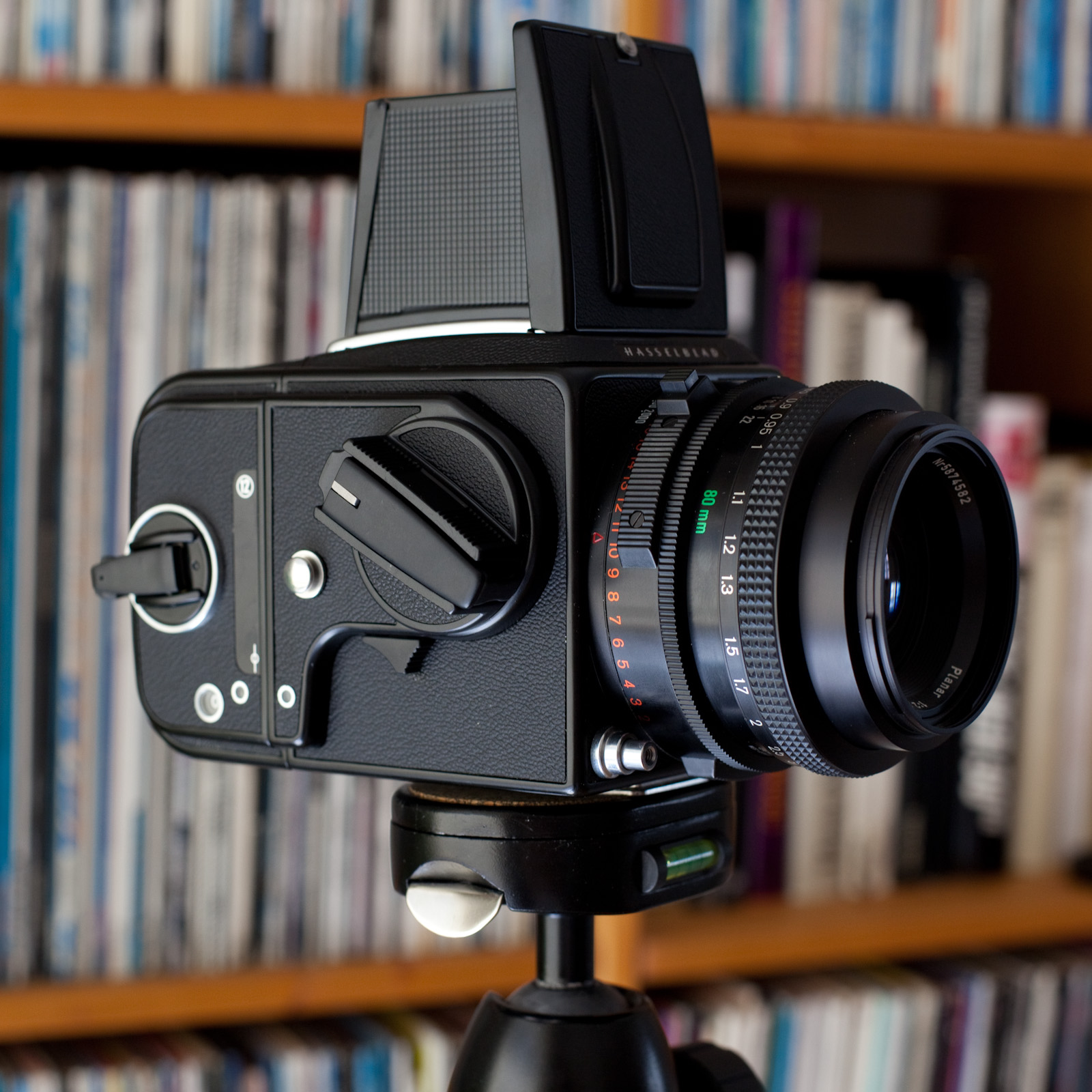
2000FC/M with Zeiss Planar 2.8/80 (F black barrel, T*)

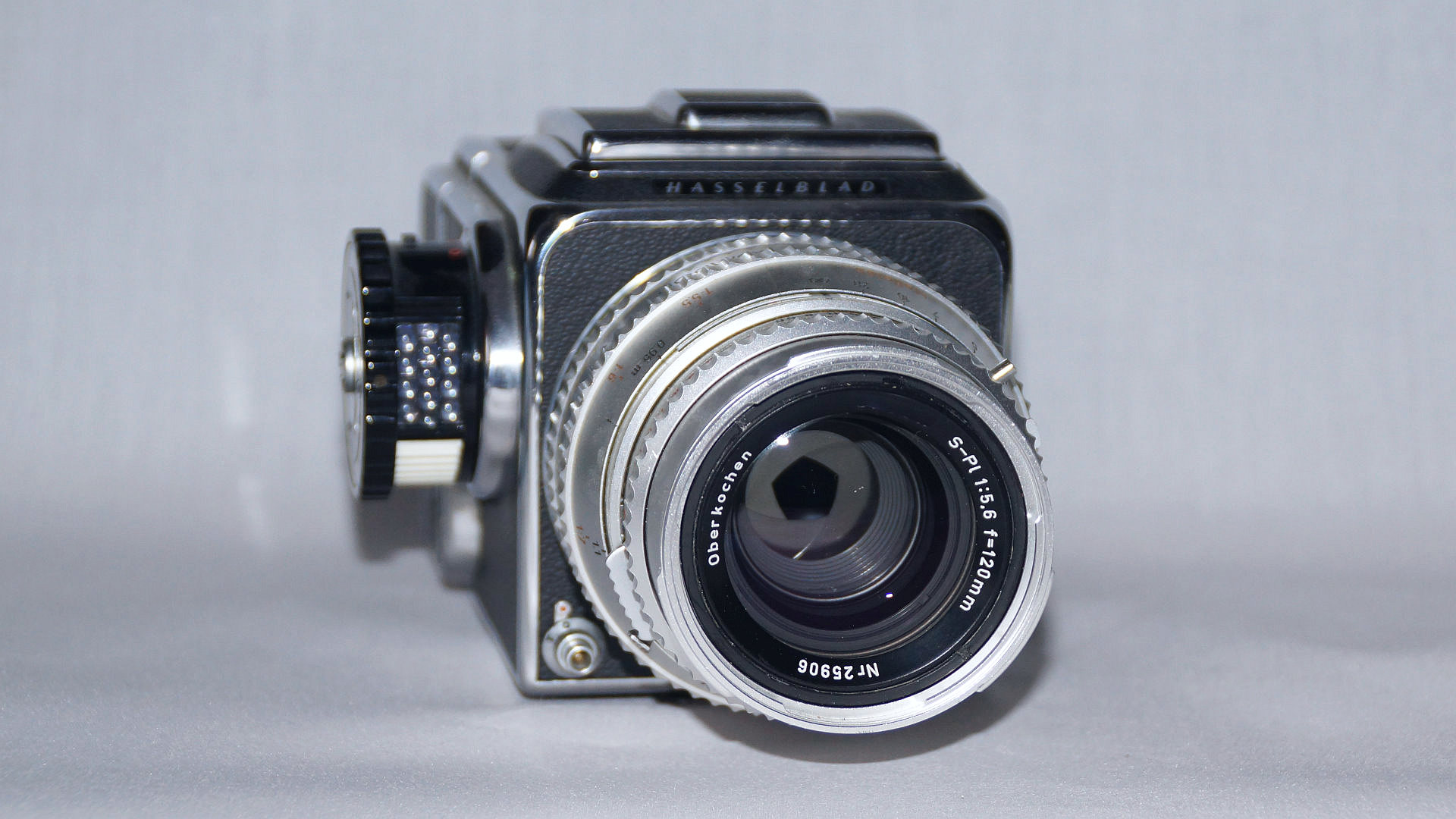
500C with Zeiss S-Planar 5.6/120 (C chrome barrel, not multicoated)

Zeiss lenses for V system cameras can be divided into several series:

- C (1957): in-lens Compur shutter; early lenses are finished in matt chrome (until 1972), while later lenses are finished in black; T* multicoating launched in 1973 and implemented system-wide by 1974.
- F (1978): no in-lens shutter, exclusive to 2000 series cameras which include a focal plane shutter; this enables wider maximum apertures and closer minimum focusing distances.
  - FE (1991): aka TCC; with electronic connections for internal meter of 200 series cameras
- CF (1982): in-lens Prontor shutter, also compatible with 2000 series (focal-plane shutter) cameras.
  - CB (1997): compact series
  - CFi (1997): internal improvements
  - CFE (1997): internal improvements, electronic connections for internal meter of 200 series cameras
  - ZV Classic (2008): optically identical to CFi/CFE

Interchangeable lenses for Hasselblad V system cameras
FL (mm)	Apr.	Mfr.	Name	Series	Construction		Min. Focus	Dimensions			Notes
FL (mm)	Apr.	Mfr.	Name	Series	Ele	Grp	Min. Focus	Φ×L	Wgt.	Filter (B/T)	Notes
Fisheye lenses
30	f/3.5–22	Zeiss	F-Distagon T*	C	8	7	0.3 m (1 ft 0 in)	108×115.5 mm (4.3×4.5 in)	1,370 g (48 oz)	26 (mid)	
30	f/3.5–22	Zeiss	F-Distagon	CF	8	7	0.3 m (1 ft 0 in)	110×117.5 mm (4.3×4.6 in)	1,365 g (48.1 oz)	26 (mid)	Filters are fixed to front lens component, which attaches via a bayonet mount. The filter is part of the optical formula, meaning the design is 9 elements / 8 groups.
30	f/3.5–22	Zeiss	F-Distagon	CFi	8	7	0.3 m (1 ft 0 in)	110×112 mm (4.3×4.4 in)	1,360 g (48 oz)	24T	
Ultra wide angle lenses
38	f/4.5–22	Zeiss	Biogon	C	8	5	0.3 m (1 ft 0 in)	78×85 mm (3.1×3.3 in)	560 g (20 oz)	63T	
38	f/4.5–22	Zeiss	Biogon	CF	8	5	0.3 m (1 ft 0 in)	80.0×81.0 mm (3.1×3.2 in)	875 g (30.9 oz)	60B	Weight includes SWC body.
38	f/4.5–22	Zeiss	Biogon	CFi	8	5	0.3 m (1 ft 0 in)	83.0×65.0 mm (3.3×2.6 in)	?	60B	
40	f/4–32	Zeiss	Distagon (T*)	C	10	9	0.5 m (1 ft 8 in)	104×124.5 mm (4.1×4.9 in)	1,375 g (48.5 oz)	104B	
40	f/4–22	Zeiss	Distagon T*	CF	11	10	0.5 m (1 ft 8 in)	90.0×101.5 mm (3.5×4.0 in)	915 g (32.3 oz)	93B	Adds separate ring to select optimal air spacing ("floating element" design) for specific focusing range.
40	f/4–22	Zeiss	Distagon T*	CFE	11	10	0.5 m (1 ft 8 in)	83.0×94.0 mm (3.3×3.7 in)	890 g (31 oz)	93B	
40	f/4–22	Zeiss	Distagon T* IF	CFE	12	9	0.5 m (1 ft 8 in)	90.0×117.9 mm (3.5×4.6 in)	1,130 g (40 oz)	93B	Internal focusing design; air spacing automatically adjusts based on focus distance.
Wide angle lenses
50	f/2.8–22	Zeiss	Distagon T*	F	9	8	0.32 m (1 ft 1 in)	90.0×112 mm (3.5×4.4 in)	1,240 g (44 oz)	86T	
50	f/2.8–22	Zeiss	Distagon T*	FE	9	8	0.42 m (1 ft 5 in)	90.0×104 mm (3.5×4.1 in)	1,010 g (36 oz)	86T	
50	f/4–22	Zeiss	Distagon (T*)	C	7	7	0.5 m (1 ft 8 in)	78×100 mm (3.1×3.9 in)	885 g (31.2 oz)	63T	
50	f/4–22	Zeiss	Distagon T*	CF	9	8	0.5 m (1 ft 8 in)	82.5×95.1 mm (3.2×3.7 in)	800 g (28 oz)	93B	Adds separate ring for "floating element" air space selection, similar to 4/40.
50	f/4–32	Zeiss	Distagon T*	CFi	9	8	0.5 m (1 ft 8 in)	83.0×89.0 mm (3.3×3.5 in)	800 g (28 oz)	70B	
50	f/4–32	Zeiss	Distagon T*	ZV	9	8	0.5 m (1 ft 8 in)	80.0×92.3 mm (3.1×3.6 in)	790 g (28 oz)	67T	
60	f/3.5–22	Zeiss	Distagon T*	C	7	7	0.6 m (2 ft 0 in)	78×85.0 mm (3.1×3.3 in)	645 g (22.8 oz)	63T	
60	f/3.5–22	Zeiss	Distagon T*	CF, CB, CFi	7	7	0.6 m (2 ft 0 in)	83.0×83.0 mm (3.3×3.3 in)	680 g (24 oz)	60B	
60	f/4–22	Zeiss	Distagon T*	C	7	?	0.55 m (1 ft 10 in)	?	?	63T (Series VIII)	f/5.6 on older versions (before 1961).
60	f/5.6–22	Zeiss	Biogon	C	8	5	0.9 m (2 ft 11 in)	78×134 mm (3.1×5.3 in)	740 g (26 oz)	63T	Requires 4 mm Réseau plate for proper focus; not compatible with most bodies.
Normal lenses
80	f/2.8–22	Zeiss	Planar (T*)	C	7	5	0.9 m (2 ft 11 in)	78×51.7 mm (3.1×2.0 in)	465 g (16.4 oz)	50B	6 elements on older versions.
80	f/2.8–22	Zeiss	Planar T*	F	7	5	0.6 m (2 ft 0 in)	80.5×64.0 mm (3.2×2.5 in)	410 g (14 oz)	50B	
80	f/2.8–22	Zeiss	Planar T*	CF, CFE	7	5	0.9 m (2 ft 11 in)	82.5×65.0 mm (3.2×2.6 in)	510 g (18 oz)	60B	
80	f/2.8–22	Zeiss	Planar T*	FE	7	5	0.6 m (2 ft 0 in)	80.5×64.0 mm (3.2×2.5 in)	430 g (15 oz)	60B	
80	f/2.8–22	Zeiss	Planar T*	CB	6	5	0.9 m (2 ft 11 in)	83.2×65.0 mm (3.3×2.6 in)	550 g (19 oz)	60	
100	f/3.5–22	Zeiss	Planar T*	C	5	4	0.9 m (2 ft 11 in)	78.0×62.0 mm (3.1×2.4 in)	610 g (22 oz)	50B	
100	f/3.5–32	Zeiss	Planar T*	CF	5	4	0.9 m (2 ft 11 in)	81.5×75.0 mm (3.2×3.0 in)	605 g (21.3 oz)	60B	
100	f/3.5–32	Zeiss	Planar T*	CFi	5	4	0.9 m (2 ft 11 in)	83.0×71.0 mm (3.3×2.8 in)	600 g (21 oz)	60B	
100	f/4–32	Zeiss	Planar T*	C	5	?	0.9 m (2 ft 11 in)	?×62.0 mm (2.4 in)	610 g (22 oz)	50B	
Portrait lenses
110	f/2–16	Zeiss	Planar T*	F, FE	7	5	0.8 m (2 ft 7 in)	82.5×87.0 mm (3.2×3.4 in)	750 g (26 oz)	77B	
150	f/2.8–22	Zeiss	Sonnar T*	F, FE	5	4	1.4 m (4 ft 7 in)	82.5×87.5 mm (3.2×3.4 in)	680 g (24 oz)	77B	
150	f/4–32	Zeiss	Sonnar (T*)	C	5	3	1.4 m (4 ft 7 in)	79.0×96.0 mm (3.1×3.8 in)	710 g (25 oz)	50B	
150	f/4–32	Zeiss	Sonnar T*	CF	5	3	1.4 m (4 ft 7 in)	81.5×100.1 mm (3.2×3.9 in)	785 g (27.7 oz)	60B	
150	f/4–32	Zeiss	Sonnar T*	CFi	5	3	1.4 m (4 ft 7 in)	83.0×95.0 mm (3.3×3.7 in)	850 g (30 oz)	60B	
160	f/4.8–22	Zeiss	Tessar T*	CB	4	3	1.5 m (4 ft 11 in)	83.2×114 mm (3.3×4.5 in)	650 g (23 oz)	60B	
180	f/4–32	Zeiss	Sonnar T*	CF, CFE	5	4	1.55 m (5 ft 1 in)	81.5×128 mm (3.2×5.0 in)	1,075 g (37.9 oz)	60B	
180	f/4–32	Zeiss	Sonnar T*	ZV	5	4	1.55 m (5 ft 1 in)	80.0×128.4 mm (3.1×5.1 in)	1,130 g (40 oz)	67T	
Telephoto lenses
250	f/4–32	Zeiss	Tele-Tessar T*	F, FE	5	5	2.5 m (8 ft 2 in)	81.2×156 mm (3.2×6.1 in)	920 g (32 oz)	77B	
250	f/5.6–45	Zeiss	Sonnar	C	4	3	2.5 m (8 ft 2 in)	79.0×156 mm (3.1×6.1 in)	930 g (33 oz)	50B	
250	f/5.6–45	Zeiss	Sonnar	CF, CFi	4	3	2.5 m (8 ft 2 in)	81.5×163.6 mm (3.2×6.4 in)	1,000 g (35 oz)	60B	
250	f/5.6–45	Zeiss	Sonnar Superachromat	C	6	6	2.8 m (9 ft 2 in)	79.0×155 mm (3.1×6.1 in)	800 g (28 oz)	50B	Corrected for extended wavelengths (400–1000 μm), no refocusing necessary for infrared photography.
250	f/5.6–45	Zeiss	Sonnar Superachromat	CFE	6	6	3.0 m (9.8 ft)	83.0×153 mm (3.3×6.0 in)	1,010 g (36 oz)	60B	Corrected for extended wavelengths (400–1000 μm), no refocusing necessary for infrared photography.
300	f/2.8–32	Zeiss	Tele-Superachromat T*	FE	9	8	2.5 m (8 ft 2 in)	138×277 mm (5.4×10.9 in)	3,800 g (130 oz)	drop-in	Bundled with Apo-Mutar 1.7x E T* teleconverter.
350	f/4–32	Zeiss	Tele-Tessar T*	F, FE	8	6	1.9 m (6 ft 3 in)	100×262 mm (3.9×10.3 in)	2,000 g (71 oz)	96T	
350	f/5.6–45	Zeiss	Tele-Tessar T*	C	4	4	5.0 m (16.4 ft)	90.0×225 mm (3.5×8.9 in)	1,350 g (48 oz)	86T	
350	f/5.6–45	Zeiss	Tele-Tessar T*	CF	4	4	4.5 m (15 ft)	90.0×226.5 mm (3.5×8.9 in)	1,350 g (48 oz)	93T	
350	f/5.6–45	Zeiss	Tele-Superachromat	CFE	9	8	3.75 m (12.3 ft)	90.0×234 mm (3.5×9.2 in)	1,800 g (63 oz)	86T	Passes extended wavelengths, no refocusing necessary for infrared photography.
500	f/8–64	Zeiss	Tele-Tessar (T*)	C	5	3	8.5 m (28 ft)	90.0×316 mm (3.5×12.4 in)	2,100 g (74 oz)	86T	
500	f/8–64	Zeiss	Tele-Apotessar T*	CF	5	3	5.0 m (16.4 ft)	90.0×329 mm (3.5×13.0 in)	1,810 g (64 oz)	86T	
1000	f/5.6	Zeiss	Mirotar	F	5	?	11.9 m (39 ft)	250×420 mm (9.8×16.5 in)	16.5 kg (36 lb)	—N/a	Special order only; neutral-density filters for exposure control
Zoom lenses
60~120	f/4.8–32	?	Zoom	FE	13	?	1.2 m (3 ft 11 in)	?×150 mm (5.9 in)	1,520 g (54 oz)	93	
140~280	f/5.6–45	Schneider	Variogon	C	17	14	2.5 m (8 ft 2 in)	?×240 mm (9.4 in)	1,870 g (66 oz)	86T (Series IX)	
140~280	f/5.6–45	Schneider	Variogon	F	17	14	2.5 m (8 ft 2 in)	?×240 mm (9.4 in)	1,870 g (66 oz)	86T (Series IX)	
140~280	f/5.6–45	Schneider	Variogon	CF	17	14	2.5 m (8 ft 2 in)	?×240 mm (9.4 in)	1,850 g (65 oz)	86T (Series IX)	
Macro lenses
120	f/4–32	Zeiss	Makro-Planar T*	CF	6	4	0.8 m (2 ft 7 in)	81.5×99.0 mm (3.2×3.9 in)	695 g (24.5 oz)	60B	
120	f/4–32	Zeiss	Makro-Planar T*	CFE, CFi	6	4	0.8 m (2 ft 7 in)	83.0×94.0 mm (3.3×3.7 in)	780, 695 g (27.5, 24.5 oz)	60B	
120	f/4–32	Zeiss	Makro-Planar T*	ZV	6	4	0.8 m (2 ft 7 in)	80.0×107.6 mm (3.1×4.2 in)	890 g (31 oz)	67T	
120	f/5.6–45	Zeiss	S-Planar (T*)	C	6	4	0.95 m (3 ft 1 in)	79×86.5 mm (3.1×3.4 in)	640 g (23 oz)	50B	
135	f/5.6–45	Zeiss	S-Planar (T*)	C	7	5	0.0535 m (2.11 in)	78.0×85.0 mm (3.1×3.3 in)	560 g (20 oz)	50B	For bellows
135	f/5.6–45	Zeiss	Makro-Planar T*	CF	7	5	—N/a	80.5×86.8 mm (3.2×3.4 in)	620 g (22 oz)	60B	For bellows
Special lenses & teleconverters
105	f/4.3–32	Zeiss	UV-Sonnar	C	7	7	1.8 m (5 ft 11 in)	78.0×87.0 mm (3.1×3.4 in)	670 g (24 oz)	50B	Passes ultraviolet and visible wavelengths (215–700 μm)
105	f/4.3–32	Zeiss	UV-Sonnar	CF	7	7	1.8 m (5 ft 11 in)	82.5×90.6 mm (3.2×3.6 in)	750 g (26 oz)	60B	Passes ultraviolet and visible wavelengths (215–700 μm)
1.4×	1.4×	Zeiss	PC-Mutar T*	(CF)	5	4	—N/a	?×80.0 mm (3.1 in)	490 g (17 oz)	—N/a	Optimized for 4/40 Distagon (CF). Provides shift for lenses shorter than (and including) 2.8/80 Planar. May be used unshifted as a teleconverter for lenses shorter than (and including) 100 mm.
1.7×	1.7×	Zeiss	Apo-Mutar T*	FE	7	4	—N/a	84.0×76.0 mm (3.3×3.0 in)	430 g (15 oz)	—N/a	Bundled with Tele-Superachromat T* 2.8/300.
2×	2×	Zeiss	Mutar T*	C, CF, F	7	?	—N/a	84.2×75.0 mm (3.3×3.0 in)	420 g (15 oz)	—N/a	S-/Makro-Planar 5.6/135 requires an intermediate extension tube.

Most V system bodies are single lens reflex cameras, using a mirror to view and frame the scene through the same lens that captures the image. Hasselblad also made the Superwide camera (SW/SWC) line, which are each equipped with a fixed 38 mm Zeiss Biogon lens but omits the mirror and reflex viewfinder, as those are precluded by the symmetric wide-angle lens design. Other specialized bodies included the FlexBody and ArcBody, which permitted view camera-like tilt and shift movements using a front lens standard connected via a flexible bellows to a rear film standard which accepted V system film backs. While the FlexBody accepted standard V system interchangeable lenses from the C/CF series, the ArcBody used specialized Rodenstock Grandagon lenses to permit a wider range of movements.

Interchangeable lenses for Hasselblad V system ArcBody cameras
FL (mm)	Apr.	Mfr.	Name	Series	Construction		Min. Focus	Dimensions			Notes
FL (mm)	Apr.	Mfr.	Name	Series	Ele	Grp	Min. Focus	Φ×L	Wgt.	Filter (B/T)	Notes
Ultra wide angle lenses
35	f/4.5–22	Rodenstock	Apo-Grandagon	ArcBody	8	4	0.5 m (1 ft 8 in)	?×55.0 mm (2.2 in)	420 g (15 oz)	77T	
Wide angle lenses
45	f/4.5–32	Rodenstock	Apo-Grandagon	ArcBody	8	4	0.5 m (1 ft 8 in)	?×65.0 mm (2.6 in)	500 g (18 oz)	77T	
Normal lenses
75	f/4.5–45	Rodenstock	Apo-Grandagon	ArcBody	8	4	1.0 m (3 ft 3 in)	?×95.0 mm (3.7 in)	660 g (23 oz)	77T	

=== Lenses for H system cameras ===
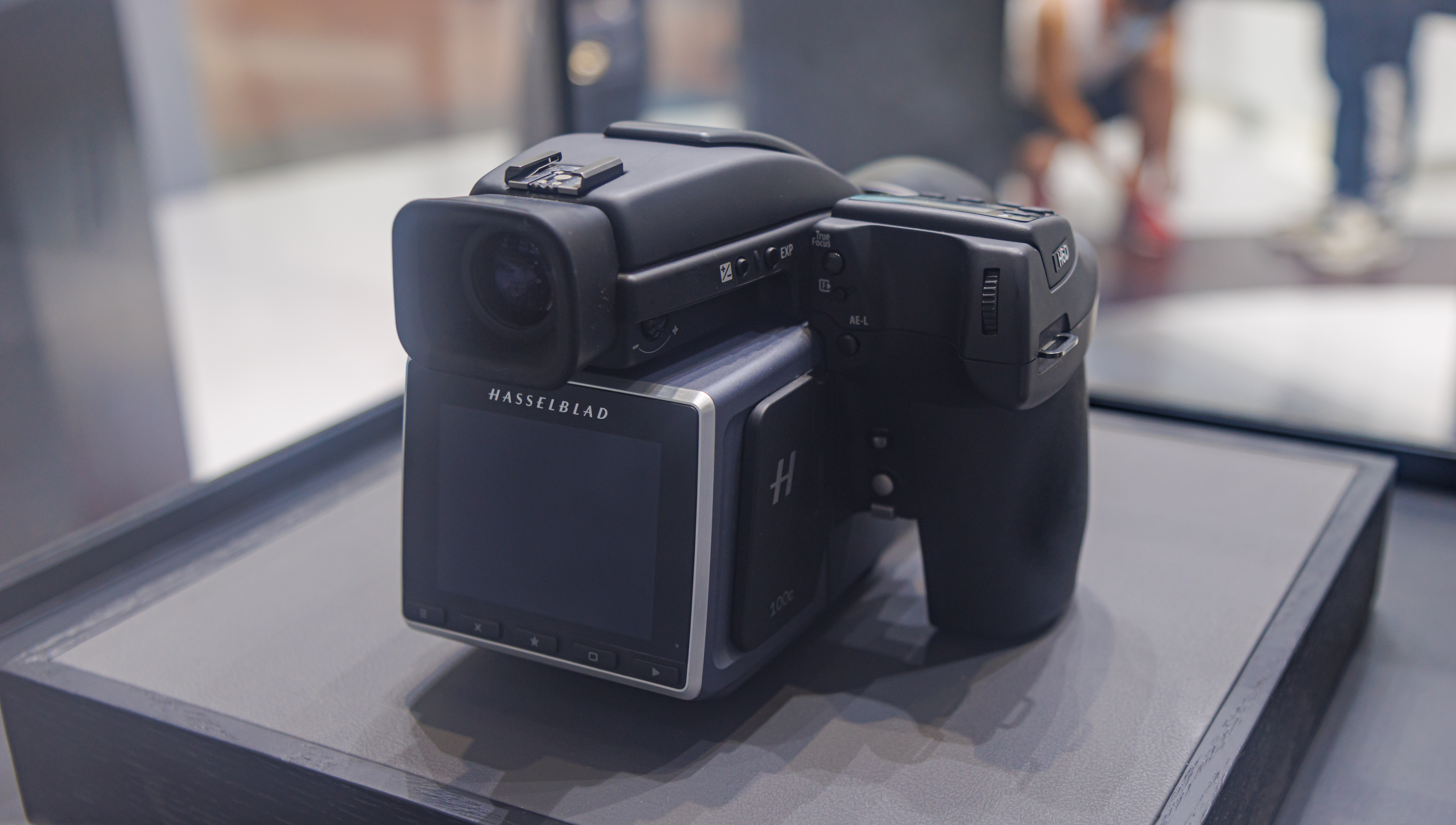
H6D with 100C back, which has a 100 MP CMOS digital image sensor

Hasselblad and Fujifilm jointly designed the H system cameras and lenses, with Fujifilm responsible for manufacturing. Each lens has an in-lens electronic leaf shutter, and the HC lenses also were sold with Fujinon branding. The Hasselblad H1 was sold with cosmetic changes as the Fujifilm GX645AF, but subsequent H system cameras do not have a Fujifilm equivalent. H system cameras accept backs which use either 120 film in the 645 format or several different sizes of digital image sensors, all of which are larger than the 36×24 mm (1.42×0.94 in) frame size of 135 film or equivalent "full-frame" sensors.

The 645 format is nominally 6×4.5 cm, but actual frame measurements are 56×41.5 mm (2.20×1.63 in), which gives a crop factor (aka focal length multiplier) of 0.62 compared to 135 film. For comparison, a H system lens with a focal length of 80 mm using an H system film back would have the equivalent coverage of a lens with a focal length of approximately 50 mm on a "full-frame" camera.

The digital sensor used in Hasselblad's product literature to determine equivalent focal length is the 100 MP CMOS sensor, which measures 53.4×40 mm (2.10×1.57 in). This means the corresponding crop factor for H system lenses (based on diagonal angle of view) using this sensor size compared to "full-frame" 135 is 0.65, nearly identical to the crop factor using 645 film; for example, a H system lens with a focal length of 80 mm capturing images using this sensor would have the equivalent coverage of a lens with a focal length of approximately 50 mm on a "full-frame" camera.

HCD lenses are optimized for slightly smaller image sensors covering 48×36 mm (1.9×1.4 in), so the crop factor for HCD lenses is slightly greater at 0.72. With these sensors, an 80 mm lens would have the equivalent coverage of a lens with a focal length of approximately 60 mm on a "full-frame" camera.

HC/HCD Interchangeable lenses for Hasselblad H system cameras
FL (mm)	Apr.	Name	Construction		Min. Focus	Dimensions			Notes
FL (mm)	Apr.	Name	Ele	Grp	Min. Focus	Φ×L	Wgt.	Filter (mm)	Notes
Ultra wide angle lenses
24	f/4.8–32	HCD 4,8/24	14	11	0.38 m (1 ft 3 in)	100×99.0 mm (3.9×3.9 in)	810 g (29 oz)	95	
28	f/4–32	HCD 4/28	12	9	0.35 m (1 ft 2 in)	100×102 mm (3.9×4.0 in)	850 g (30 oz)	95	
35	f/3.5–32	HC 3,5/35	11	10	0.50 m (1 ft 8 in)	100×124 mm (3.9×4.9 in)	975 g (34.4 oz)	95	
Wide angle lenses
50	f/3.5–32	HC 3,5/50 II	11	7	0.60 m (2 ft 0 in)	85.0×116 mm (3.3×4.6 in)	975 g (34.4 oz)	77	
Normal lenses
80	f/2.8–32	HC / HCD 2,8/80	6	6	0.70 m (2 ft 4 in)	84.0×70.0 mm (3.3×2.8 in)	475 g (16.8 oz)	67	
Portrait lenses
100	f/2.2–32	HC 2,2/100	6	5	0.90 m (2 ft 11 in)	87.5×80.5 mm (3.4×3.2 in)	780 g (28 oz)	77	
150	f/3.2–45	HC 3,2/150 N	9	8	1.30 m (4 ft 3 in)	86.0×124 mm (3.4×4.9 in)	970 g (34 oz)	77	
Telephoto lenses
210	f/4–45	HC 4/210	10	6	1.80 m (5 ft 11 in)	86.0×168 mm (3.4×6.6 in)	1,320 g (47 oz)	77	
300	f/4.5–45	HC 4,5/300	9	7	2.45 m (8 ft 0 in)	100×198 mm (3.9×7.8 in)	2,120 g (75 oz)	95	
Zoom lenses
35~90	f/4~5.6–32	HCD 4,0~5,6/35~90 Aspherical	13	11	0.65 m (2 ft 2 in)	102.5×167 mm (4.0×6.6 in)	1,410 g (50 oz)	95	
50~110	f/3.5~4.5–32	HC 3,5~4,5/50~110	14	9	0.70 m (2 ft 4 in)	103×152 mm (4.1×6.0 in)	1,650 g (58 oz)	95	
Macro lenses
120	f/4–32	HC Macro 4/120 II	9	9	0.39 m (1 ft 3 in)	96.0×166 mm (3.8×6.5 in)	1,410 g (50 oz)	67	
Teleconverters
1.7×	1.7× (1 1/2 stops)	H 1.7X Converter	6	4	—N/a	85.0×56.0 mm (3.3×2.2 in)	465 g (16.4 oz)	—N/a	Not compatible with HC 3,5/35 or HC 3,5-4,5/50-110; AF disabled when used with HC Macro 4/120 or HC 4,5/300.

=== Lenses for X system cameras ===
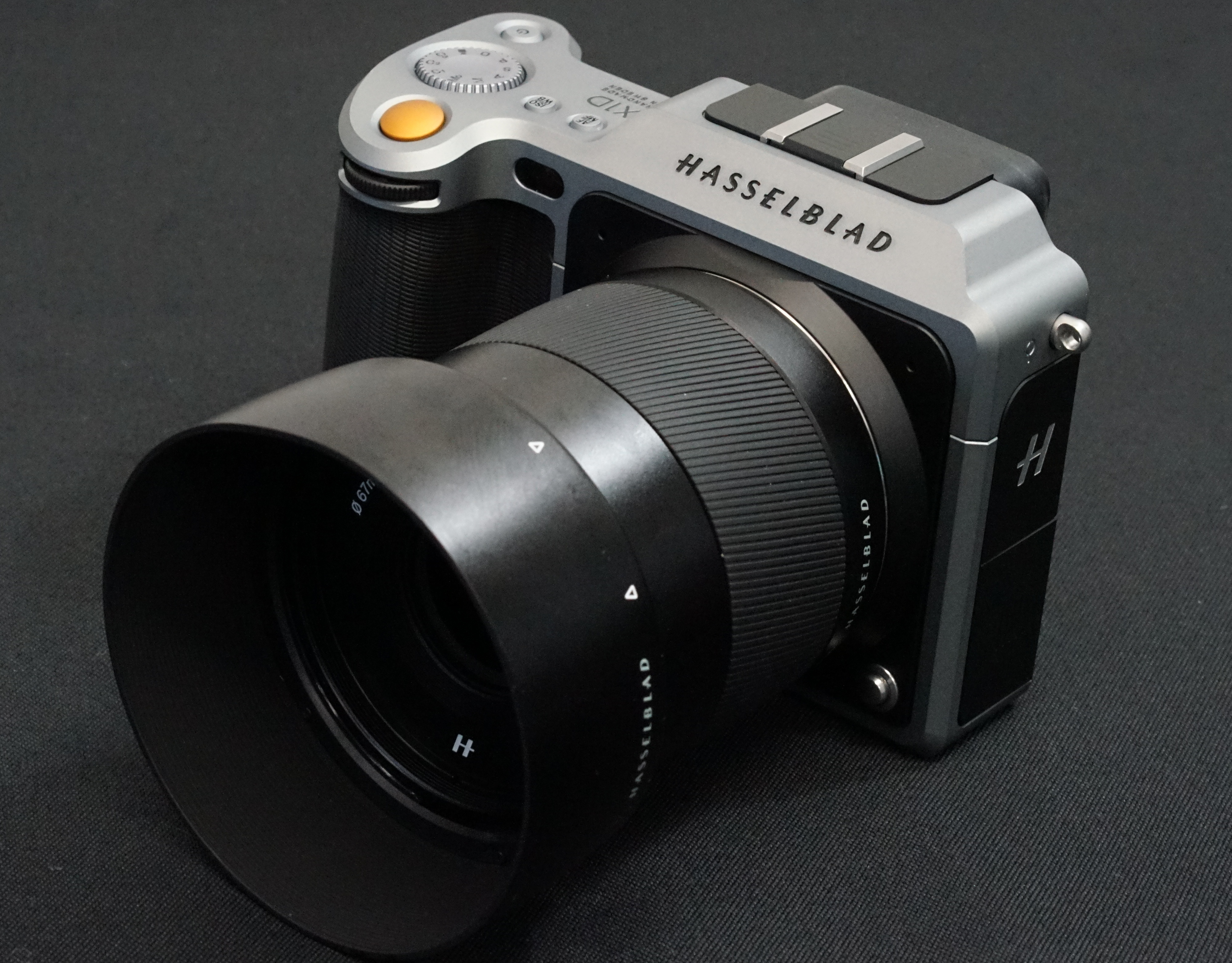
Preproduction X1D with XCD 3,2/90 lens

The X system uses a digital sensor which measures 43.8×32.9 mm (1.72×1.30 in), larger than the 36×24 mm (1.42×0.94 in) "full-frame" sensors based on 135 film. This means the crop factor for X system lenses (based on diagonal angle of view) compared to "full-frame" 135 is 0.79; for example, a X system lens with a focal length of 65 mm would have the equivalent coverage of a lens with a focal length of approximately 50 mm on a "full-frame" camera.

X system lenses are designed by Hasselblad and manufactured in Japan by Nittoh Kogaku, who also manufactured the lenses for the XPan/TX. X system cameras can accept XPan, H system, and V system lenses with the appropriate adapters; for adapted H system lenses, leaf shutter, autofocus, and aperture control are retained.

XCD interchangeable lenses for Hasselblad X system cameras
FL (mm)	Apr.	Name	Series	Construction		Min. Focus	Dimensions			Notes
FL (mm)	Apr.	Name	Series	Ele	Grp	Min. Focus	Φ×L	Wgt.	Filter (mm)	Notes
Ultra wide angle lenses
21	f/4–32	XCD 4/21	—N/a	13	9	0.32 m (1 ft 1 in)	83.0×106 mm (3.3×4.2 in)	600 g (21 oz)	77	
25	f/2.5–32	XCD 2,5/25V	V	13	10	0.25 m (9.8 in)	75.0×105 mm (3.0×4.1 in)	592 g (20.9 oz)	72	
Wide angle lenses
28	f/4–32	XCD 4,0/28P	P	9	8	0.22 m (8.7 in)	75.0×48.0 mm (3.0×1.9 in)	245 g (8.6 oz)	72	
30	f/3.5–32	XCD 3,5/30	—N/a	11	10	0.4 m (1 ft 4 in)	83.0×88.0 mm (3.3×3.5 in)	550 g (19 oz)	77	
38	f/2.5–32	XCD 2,5/38V	V	10	9	0.30 m (1 ft 0 in)	76.0×68.0 mm (3.0×2.7 in)	350 g (12 oz)	72	
45	f/3.5–32	XCD 3,5/45	—N/a	9	7	0.4 m (1 ft 4 in)	76.0×75.0 mm (3.0×3.0 in)	417 g (14.7 oz)	67	
45	f/4–32	XCD 4/45P	P	9	7	0.35 m (1 ft 2 in)	80.0×52.0 mm (3.1×2.0 in)	320 g (11 oz)	62	
Normal lenses
55	f/2.5–32	XCD 2,5/55V	V	9	8	0.45 m (1 ft 6 in)	76.0×72.0 mm (3.0×2.8 in)	372 g (13.1 oz)	72	
65	f/2.8–32	XCD 2,8/65	—N/a	10	6	0.5 m (1 ft 8 in)	81.0×93.0 mm (3.2×3.7 in)	727 g (25.6 oz)	67	
Portrait lenses
80	f/1.9–32	XCD 1,9/80	—N/a	14	9	0.7 m (2 ft 4 in)	84.0×112 mm (3.3×4.4 in)	1,044 g (36.8 oz)	77	
90	f/2.5–32	XCD 2,5/90V	V	9	6	0.67 m (2 ft 2 in)	75.0×95.0 mm (3.0×3.7 in)	551 g (19.4 oz)	72	
90	f/3.2–32	XCD 3,2/90	—N/a	10	8	0.7 m (2 ft 4 in)	77.0×100 mm (3.0×3.9 in)	619 g (21.8 oz)	67	
135	f/2.8–32	XCD 2,8/135	—N/a	10	6	1.0 m (3 ft 3 in)	81.0×149 mm (3.2×5.9 in)	935 g (33.0 oz)	77	Bundled with dedicated 1.7× teleconverter.
Telephoto lenses
Zoom lenses
20~35	f/3.2~4.5–32	XCD 3,2-4,5/20-35E	E	16	12	0.32 m (1 ft 1 in)	81.0×117 mm (3.2×4.6 in)	805 g (28.4 oz)	77	
35~75	f/3.5~4.5–45	XCD 3,5~4,5/35~75	—N/a	15	13	0.42 m (1 ft 5 in)	85.0×141 mm (3.3×5.6 in)	1,115 g (39.3 oz)	77	
35~100	f/2.8~4–32	XCD 2,8~4/35~100E	E	16	13	0.4 m (1 ft 4 in)	90×138 mm (3.5×5.4 in)	894 g (31.5 oz)	86	
Macro lenses
120	f/3.5–45	XCD 3,5/120 Macro	—N/a	10	7	0.43 m (1 ft 5 in)	81.0×150 mm (3.2×5.9 in)	970 g (34 oz)	77	Focuses to 1:2 mag.
Teleconverters
1.7× (230)	f/4.8–55	X Converter 1,7	—N/a	6	4	1.05 m (3 ft 5 in)	81.0×46.0 mm (3.2×1.8 in)	437 g (15.4 oz)	—N/a	Dedicated teleconverter for XCD 2,8/135 lens.

== Small format cameras ==
=== Lenses for XPan cameras ===
The Fujifilm TX-1 is a rangefinder which captures images in standard 24×36 mm format or panoramic 24×65 mm format on 135 film, introduced in 1998 and marketed by Hasselblad as the XPan outside of Japan. It was succeeded by the TX-2 / XPan II in 2003.

The crop factor for the panoramic format (based on diagonal angle of view) compared to "full-frame" 135 is 0.62; for example, the 90 mm XPan lens in panoramic mode would have the equivalent coverage across the diagonal of a lens with a focal length of approximately 55 mm on a standard 135 film camera.

Interchangeable lenses for Hasselblad XPan (Fujifilm TX) cameras
FL (mm)	Apr.	Name	Construction		Min. Focus	Dimensions			Notes
FL (mm)	Apr.	Name	Ele	Grp	Min. Focus	Φ×L	Wgt.	Filter (mm)	Notes
Ultra wide angle lenses
30	f/5.6–22	5.6/30 mm Aspherical	10	8	0.7 m (2 ft 4 in)	?×63.0 mm (2.5 in)	310 g (11 oz)	58	Complete kit includes lens, viewfinder, lens shade, and centre filter
Wide angle lenses
45	f/4–22	4/45 mm	8	6	0.7 m (2 ft 4 in)	?×47.0 mm (1.9 in)	235 g (8.3 oz)	49	
Portrait lenses
90	f/4–22	4/90 mm	9	7	1.0 m (3 ft 3 in)	?×73.0 mm (2.9 in)	365 g (12.9 oz)	49	
