= Gauss lens =

Type of lens

- Introduced in: c. 1817
- Author: Carl Friedrich Gauss
- Construction: 2 elements in 2 groups

The Gauss lens is a compound achromatic lens that uses two uncemented elements; in its most basic form, a positive meniscus lens on the object side and a negative meniscus lens on the image side. It was first proposed in 1817 by the mathematician Carl Friedrich Gauss for a refracting telescope design, but was seldom implemented and is better known as the basis for the Double-Gauss lens first proposed in 1888 by Alvan Graham Clark, which is a four-element, four-group compound lens that uses a symmetric pair of Gauss lenses.

== Design ==
The power of the positive element predominates, but the negative element corrects for chromatic aberration; the positive element facing the object is made of crown glass, while the negative element facing the image is made of flint glass, separated by an air gap that takes the shape of a negative element. Gauss first described the arrangement in 1817. Alvan Clark & Sons built a 9 1/2 in (240 mm) telescope for Princeton University in 1877 using a Gauss lens; although Gauss had designed the optics to eliminate spherical aberration for different wavelengths, the Clarks "found these meniscus components difficult to make [and] disagreed that they gave a more complete achromatism and better definition". The telescope is now held by the National Museum of American History.

Alvan G. Clark, the son of the founder of the eponymous American optical company, designed a photographic lens using a symmetric arrangement of two Gauss lenses and patented it in 1888; Paul Rudolph introduced the Zeiss Planar as an improved Double-Gauss using cemented doublets in the place of the inner negative meniscus elements, and Horace William Lee of the Taylor, Taylor and Hobson Company completed the evolution by introducing asymmetry to the Double-Gauss design with the 1920 Opic. Derivatives of the Opic have dominated the design of high-speed (large aperture) photographic lenses since then.
