= Double-Gauss lens =

Compound lens

Double Gauss
- Introduced in: 1888 (Clark); 1896 (Rudolph; Zeiss Planar); 1920 (Lee; Taylor, Taylor and Hobson Opic)
- Author: Alvan Graham Clark, Paul Rudolph, and Horace William Lee
- Construction: 4–6 elements in 4+ groups

The double Gauss lens is a compound lens used mostly in camera lenses that reduces optical aberrations over a large focal plane.

== Design ==
Development of the Double Gauss

The earliest double Gauss lens, patented by Alvan Graham Clark in 1888, consists of two symmetrically arranged Gauss lenses. Each Gauss lens is a two-element achromatic lens with a positive meniscus lens on the object side and a negative meniscus lens on the image side. In Clark's symmetric arrangement, this makes four elements in four groups: two positive meniscus lenses on the outside with two negative meniscus lenses inside them. The symmetry of the system and the splitting of the optical power into many elements reduces the optical aberrations within the system.

There are many variations of the design. Sometimes extra lens elements are added. The basic lens type is one of the most developed and used photographic lenses. The design forms the basis for many camera lenses in use today, especially the wide-aperture standard lenses used with 35 mm and other small-format cameras. It can offer good results up to f/1.4 with a wide field of view, usually with seven elements for extra aberration control. Modern super wide aperture models of f/1.0 can have eight or more elements, while more moderate aperture f/2.8 versions can be simplified to five elements.

The Double Gauss was likely the most intensively studied lens formula of the twentieth century, producing dozens of major variants, scores of minor variants, hundreds of marketed lenses and tens of millions of unit sales. It has few flaws, most notably a small amount of oblique spherical aberration, which could lower peripheral contrast. Double Gauss/Planar tweaks formed the basis for most normal and near-normal prime lens designs with wide apertures for sixty years.

== History ==
=== Early development ===
The original two element Gauss was a telescope objective lens consisting of closely spaced positive and negative menisci, invented in 1817 by Carl Friedrich Gauss as an improvement to the Fraunhofer Achromatic telescope objective lens by adding a meniscus lens to its single convex and concave lens design. Alvan Graham Clark and Bausch & Lomb further refined the design in 1888 by taking two of these lenses and placing them back to back, making a "double Gauss" design, albeit with indifferent photographic results.

Current double Gauss lenses can be traced back to an 1895 improved design, when Paul Rudolph of Carl Zeiss Jena thickened the interior negative menisci and converted to them to cemented doublets of two elements of equal refraction but differing dispersion for the Zeiss Planar design of 1896 to correct for chromatic aberration. It was the original six element symmetric f/4.5 double Gauss lens. Horace William Lee added a slight asymmetry to the Planar in 1920, and created the Taylor, Taylor & Hobson Series 0 (also called the Lee Opic, UK) f/2 lens. It was commercially unsuccessful, but its asymmetry is the foundation of the modern double Gauss, including the Zeiss Biotar.

=== Modern designs ===
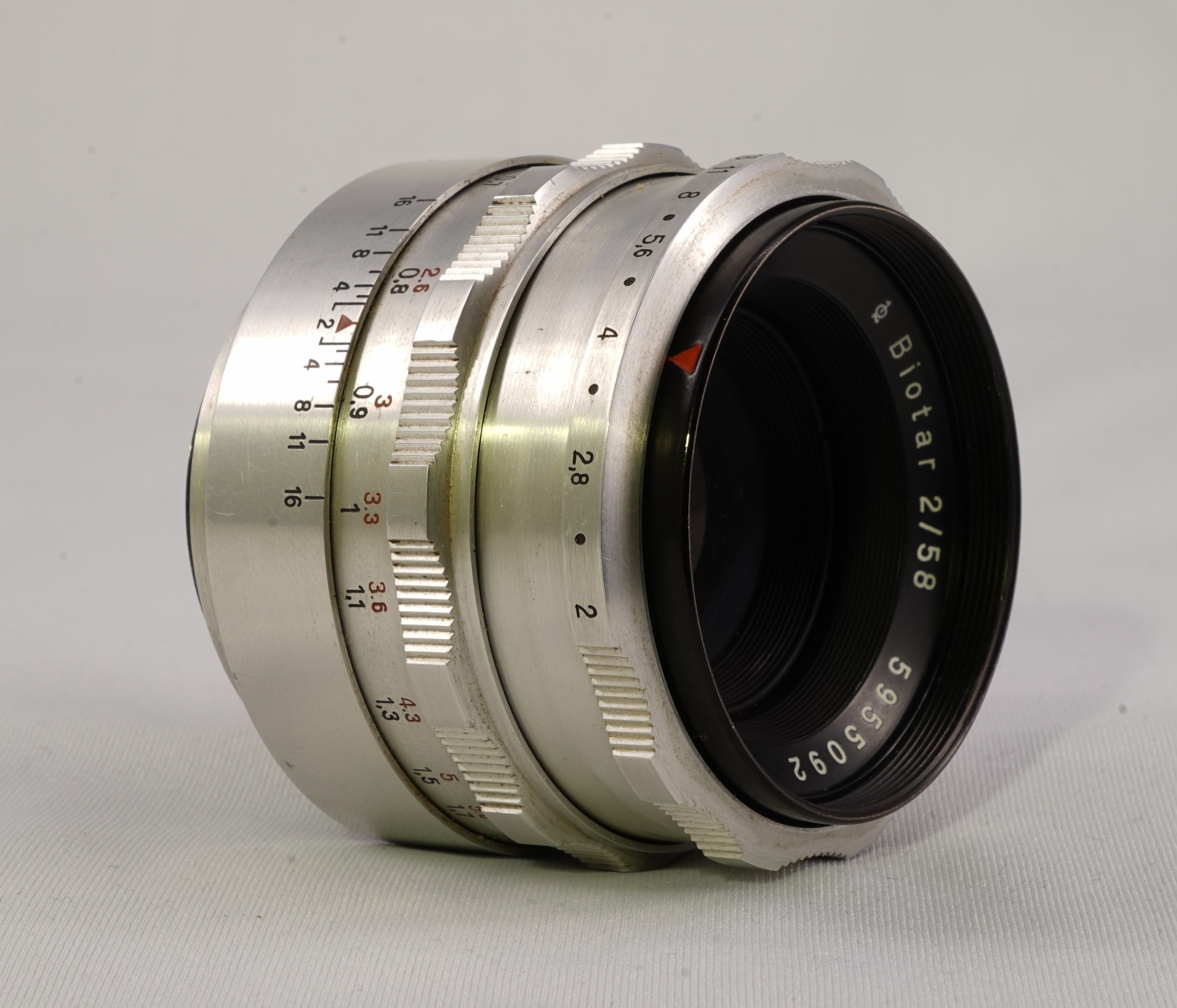
Zeiss Biotar 58mm f/2

Later the design was developed with additional glasses to give high-performance lenses of wide aperture. The main development was due to Taylor Hobson in the 1920s, resulting in the f/2.0 Opic and later the Speed Panchro designs, which were licensed to various other manufacturers. In 1927, Lee modified the Opic design and increased the maximum aperture up to f/1.4, which was named the Ultra Panchro lens. Further improvement was done by Lee in 1930, the Super Speed Panchro. It was a f/1.5 fast design with seven elements in five groups, which influenced later fast speed lens designs, being cited by many lens manufacturers until the 1960s.

Zeiss Biotar diagram

The Biotar is another competitor of British Panchro series. In the same year of 1927, Zeiss designed the Biotar 50mm f/1.4 for cinematography. Its still photography version, the Zeiss Biotar 58mm f/2 (Germany) appeared on the Ihagee Kine Exakta (1936, Germany), the first widely available 35mm single-lens reflex cameras, in 1939. It was also the standard lens on the VEB Zeiss Ikon (Dresden) Contax S (1949, East Germany), the first pentaprism eye-level viewing 35mm SLR. The Biotar, originally designed in 1927, had a six element asymmetric double Gauss formula. Post-World War II Zeiss (Oberkochen, West Germany) no longer uses the Biotar name; instead lumping all double Gauss variants under the Planar name. The Soviet 58mm f/2 Helios-44 lens of the Zenit camera was the most common version/clone of the Biotar, making an excellent value-for-money accessory today for any digital camera with APS-C and Full-Frame sized sensor, though an appropriate M42 adaptor is required for this particular lens.

Several contemporaneous competing, but less famous lenses, were similar to the Biotar, such as Albrecht Tronnier's Xenon for Schneider Kreuznach (1925, Germany). For example, three asymmetric Double Gauss lenses were produced in 1934 for Ihagee VP Exakta (1933, Germany) the type 127 roll film SLR camera: 8 cm f/2 versions of both the Biotar and Xenon, as well as the Dallmeyer Super Six 3 inch f/1.9 (UK).

Other early Double Gauss variants for 35mm cameras included the Kodak Ektar 45mm f/2 on the Kodak Bantam Special (1936, USA), the Kodak Ektar 50mm f/1.9 for the Kodak Ektra (1941, USA), the Voigtländer Ultron 50mm f/2 on the Voigtländer Vitessa (1951, West Germany) and the Leitz Summicron 50mm f/2 for the Leica M3 (1953, West Germany). A notable, but largely-forgotten, use of the Double-Gauss formula was in the Canon 28mm f/3.5 (1951, Japan) in M39 mount for Rangefinder cameras. By enlarging the rear group significantly (compared to a Double-Gauss type of more traditional focal length), the field of view was increased while keeping the aperture relatively large- making it, for a time, the fastest 28mm lens available for 35mm cameras by a large margin.

=== Later development and proliferation ===
In 1966, Asahi Pentax combined the Super Speed Panchro type and the Xenon type, developing the seven-element, six-group Super Takumar 50mm f/1.4 (v2). During the 1960s to early 80s every optical house had Super Panchro type or Super Takumar type double Gauss normal lenses jockeying for sales. For example, compare the Tokyo Optical RE Auto-Topcor 5.8 cm f/1.4 for the Topcon RE Super/Super D (1963), Olympus G. Zuiko Auto-S 40mm f/1.4 for the Olympus Pen F (lens 1964, camera 1963), Yashica Auto Yashinon DX 50mm f/1.4 for the Yashica TL Super (1967), Canon FL 50mm f/1.4 (v2) for the Canon FT (lens 1968, camera 1966), Asahi Optical Super Takumar 50mm f/1.4 (v2) for the Pentax Spotmatic (lens 1968, camera 1964), Fuji Fujinon 50mm f/1.4 for the Fujica ST701 (1971), Minolta MC Rokkor-PG 50mm f/1.4 for the Minolta XK/XM/X-1 (1973), Zeiss Planar HFT 50mm f/1.4 for the Rolleiflex SL350 (1974), Konica Hexanon AR 50mm f/1.4 for the Konica Autoreflex T3 (lens 1974, camera 1973) and Nippon Kogaku Nikkor (K) 50mm f/1.4 (New) for the Nikon F2 (lens 1976, camera 1971); all from Japan except the Zeiss which was designed in West Germany.

History of Double Gauss lens designs

1936–1964

1964–1977

1978–2010

=== Current status ===
Zoom lenses have been dominant since the 1980s and so there have been few newly designed Double Gauss normal lenses, but many new prestige low production Double Gauss lenses have been released. Compare the Canon EF 50mm f/1.2L USM (2007, Japan), Nikon AF-S Nikkor 50mm f/1.4G (2008, Japan/China), Sigma EX DG HSM 50mm f/1.4 (2008, Japan), (Cosina) Voigtländer Nokton 50mm f/1.1 (2009, Japan), Leica Noctilux-M 50mm f/0.95 ASPH (2009, Germany) with their antecedents, or SLR Magic HyperPrime 50mm CINE T0.95 (2012, Hong Kong, China).

The design is presently used in inexpensive-but-high-quality fast lenses such as the Sony FE 50mm f/1.8, the Canon EF 50mm f/1.8 and the Nikon 50 mm f/1.8D AF Nikkor. It is also used as the basis for faster designs, with elements added, such as a seventh element as in both Canon and Nikon's 50 mm f/1.4 offerings or an aspherical seventh element in Canon's 50 mm f/1.2L. The design appears in other applications where a simple fast normal lens is required (≈53° diagonal) such as in projectors.
