= Horace William Lee =

Optical designer

Horace William Lee was an optical designer responsible for developing multiple influential lens designs, including the Opic (1920), an asymmetric large-aperture double Gauss lens, and the inverted telephoto wide-angle lens (1930), while working for the English optics firm Taylor, Taylor & Hobson (TT&H), which manufactured lenses in Leicester under the Cooke brand. Lee's designs helped to develop the modern cinematography industry, with high-speed lenses enabling sound synchronization, and the inverted telephoto providing enough space for a beam-splitter apparatus to capture color.

== Early life and education ==
Horace Lee was born in January 1889 and graduated from Cambridge University in 1911 with a Bachelor of Arts degree. He married Grace Burrows (1893–1981) in March 1919 and the couple had three sons. Burrows was an accomplished violinist and teacher who helped to organize the Leicester Symphony Orchestra.

== Career ==
Asymmetric double Gauss lens design by Lee (1920); GB 157,040

Lee started at TT&H in 1913 as the assistant to prolific designer Arthur Warmisham. He developed the first f/2.0 lens in 1920, which subsequently was marketed as the OPIC (1924) and Speed Panchro (1930). Lee's 1920 patent traces the development of the Gauss lens and subsequent double-Gauss type through the 1896 patent by Paul Rudolph, which improved the aperture to f/4; in comparison, Lee's lens gathered four times as much light by introducing an asymmetry to the lens geometry. Rudolf Kingslake said Lee's design influenced "other designers [who] began to realize the virtues of this type of construction", including German designers Tronnier (Schneider Xenon, 1925), Merté (Zeiss Biotar, 1927), and Berek (Leitz Summar, 1933) The Jazz Singer (1927) was filmed using OPIC lenses; as the first feature-length fully sound-synchronized motion picture, the fast OPIC lenses were needed to compensate for the increased frame rate and decreased illumination. The OPIC lenses were rebranded as Speed Panchro and offered in a variety of focal lengths, ranging from 24 to 108 mm, starting from 1930.

Inverted telephoto lens design by Lee (1930); GB 355,452

That year, Lee also patented the inverted telephoto lens design, which allowed color reproduction for the motion picture industry. In Lee's design, the inverted telephoto arrangement creates a flange focal distance that exceeds the focal length, giving the camera designer more room to insert mechanical equipment. Lee's invention allowed the insertion of a beamsplitter between the lens and film, which separated light into three color components which were recorded simultaneously and recombined in the Technicolor process. This was developed later after World War II by Pierre Angénieux, which he marketed as the Retrofocus lens. Inverted telephoto designs became predominant for wide angle lenses used on single-lens reflex cameras, which required a longer flange focal distance to clear the bulky moving mirror that relays the image to the viewfinder.

Lee left TT&H in 1936 and joined a series of companies after that, including Scophony, Pullin, and Aldis, publishing scientific articles on lenses and optics until 1945; Burrows and Lee moved to Warsash near Southampton in their later years. He died in 1976 and is buried in Warsash.
