= Meyer Optik Görlitz =

Lens manufacturer

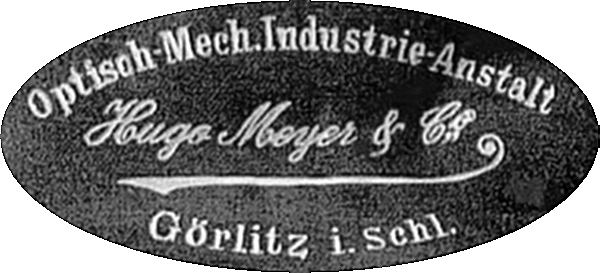
- Company type: Aktiengesellschaft
- Industry: Imaging
- Founded: Görlitz, Germany; 1896; 130 years ago
- Founder: Hugo Meyer, Heinrich Schätze
- Headquarters: Görlitz, Germany
- Key people: Hugo Meyer
- Products: eyeglasses, binoculars, spotting scopes, telescopes, planetarium projectors, and other optical equipment.

Meyer Optik Görlitz (or Goerlitz; German), originally Hugo Meyer & Co., was a former optical company from Görlitz in Germany. It was founded in 1896 by optician Hugo Meyer (May 21, 1863 – March 1, 1905) and businessman Heinrich Schätze. The company got off to a successful start with the development of the wide-angle Aristostigmat lens and the subsequent acquisition of Optical Institute Schulze and Billerbeck, the manufacturers of “Euryplan lenses”, as they were called at the time.

== History ==
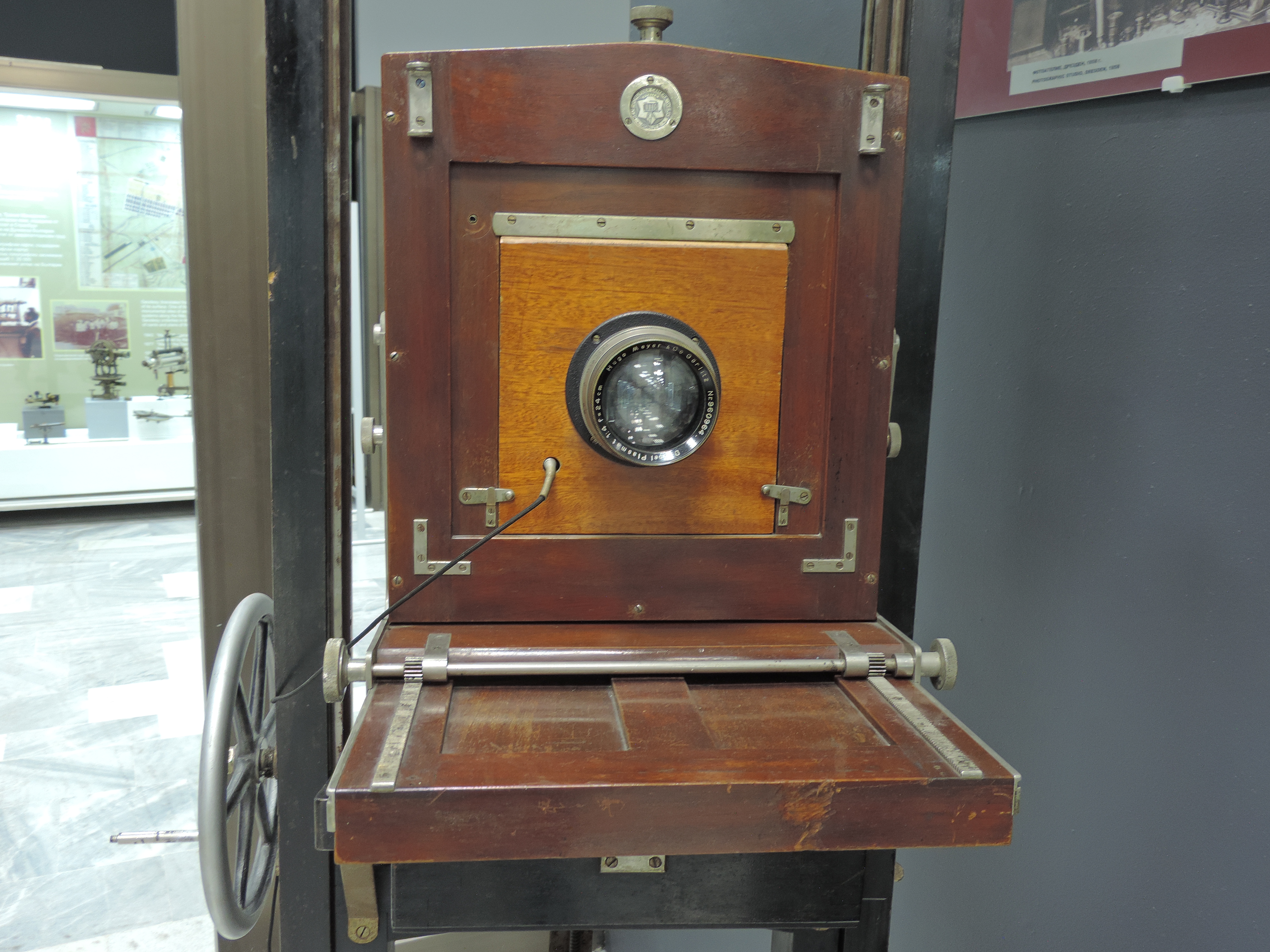
Studio camera "Görlitz" Germany, 1930's, National Polytechnic Museum in Sofia

A key business decision was made in 1920 when the company decided to work with former Zeiss developer Paul Rudolph, who was previously significantly involved in the success of the Protar, Planar and Tessar lenses. Rudolph also gave Meyer Optik access to his patent for the so-called Plasmat lenses, which at the time included one of the most powerful lenses in the world. In 1936, the company was renamed Optische und Feinmechanische Werke Hugo Meyer & Co and produced approximately 100,000 lenses a year. During World War II, civilian production discontinued and mainly optical components for telescopes were produced.

After the war, the company was expropriated from the Saxony armaments industry and management under the name VEB Optisch-Feinmechanische Werke Görlitz. In the post-war era, the company produced mainly Trioplan triplets, usually for viewfinder cameras produced by Dresden-based camera manufacturers Welta, Balda, Beier, and Altissa. After being integrated into the VEB Pentacon and VEB Carl Zeiss collectives, the Meyer-Optik name was no longer inscribed on lenses after 1971. Many products were discontinued in favor of competing models produced by Carl Zeiss, while the equipment required to produce high-quality zoom lenses could not be procured.

In 1990, Feinoptische Werk Görlitz was spun off from VEB Carl Zeiss and converted into a private limited company and started to produce lenses with the Meyer-Optik logo. However, despite privatization efforts, the company was unable to attract investors and was liquidated shortly after.

In 2014, net SE, a publicly listed company (NETK) founded in 1997, working with the brand manager Globell B.V., exhibited new lenses under the Meyer-Optik-Görlitz name at the Photokina trade fair and began delivering the lenses in December of the same year.

In May 2015, net SE created a new subsidiary, Meyer Optik USA Inc., to distribute Meyer-Optik-Görlitz brands in the United States. Meyer Optik USA is headquartered in Atlanta, GA. That same year, net SE - Globell Deutschland launched a Kickstarter campaign to produce the Trioplan f2.9/50, a special new lens that revived the tradition of a versatile "soap-bubble" bokeh lens. Successive kickstarter lens campaigns collectively raised approximately $2.5 million.

In August 2016 net SE filed for bankruptcy, leaving backers empty-handed. Geoff Livingston, a contractor for Meyer Optik Görlitz described limited manufacturing capabilities and successive launches of new crowdfunding campaigns prior to shipping previous products.

In 2018 Meyer Optik Görlitz was purchased by OPC Optics. One of the newly launched lenses under the revived brand, the $3,000 Nocturnus 50mm f/0.95, was revealed to be a Chinese lens despite being labelled "made in Germany."
