= Cooke Optics =

British optical manufacturer

Cooke Optics Ltd. is a camera lens manufacturing company based in Leicester.

== History ==
The foundation of Cooke Optics is coincident with Taylor, Taylor and Hobson (TTH) in 1886, as the sole activity of TTH was the manufacture of lenses under the Cooke branding. Administratively speaking, Cooke Optics is a spin-off of Taylor-Hobson, created after Taylor-Hobson shifted its focus to metrology instruments.

The brand name Cooke originally came from the company T. Cooke & Sons of York, a manufacturer of telescopes. The optical manager of that company, H. Dennis Taylor (no relation), devised the Cooke triplet lens in the 1890s. Cooke of York was not interested in the manufacture of camera lenses, and licensed this design and others to TTH. Subsequently many of TTH's own designs, though unconnected with Cooke of York, also carried the Cooke brand. The Cooke triplet lens was also made under licence by Voigtländer and other companies.

Throughout the twentieth century TTH produced a series of innovations, and supplied lenses for the (once large) UK camera industry, for photolithography in the printing industry in the USA and UK, and for cinematography. It provided a succession of technical solutions for Hollywood's evolving needs.

Bell & Howell took control of the company in 1930, but it was sold to Rank in 1946. In its later years, Taylor-Hobson's main interest was metrology, and it now operates as a subsidiary of Ametek.

In 1998, Cooke Optics was a new company formed following a buy-out of the Optical division of Taylor-Hobson. Chairman Les Zellan led the buy-out. Dave Stevens was then Managing Director of the Leicester-based facility and remained so until 2008 when Robert Howard replaced him as Chief Executive Officer. In 2018 Cooke Optics was acquired by Caledonia Investments. In 2020 Cooke announced the appointment of Tim Pugh as Chief Executive Officer and Kees van Oostrum as Non-Executive Chairman.

The company now designs and manufactures 35 mm lenses for the film industry. In a reversion to its previous markets, it has also made limited quantities of the PS945, a redesigned Pinkham and Smith portrait lens, and the Series XVa, a redesigned triple-convertible lens for 10×8 inch format. The company distributes to over 60 countries worldwide and exports 90% of its production.

In 2013, the Academy of Motion Picture Arts and Sciences gave the company an award of merit, saying it "helped define the look of motion pictures over the last century," with innovations over the years that have included zoom lenses for movie cameras and lenses that did not require bright lights. resulting in lenses that produce what is known in the industry as the "Cooke look" — warm, natural images on the screen.

== Products ==
Notable products include:

- a soft-focus 'portrait' lens favoured by Clarence White and Alfred Stieglitz
- the Aviar aerial survey lens, designed in World War I when German lenses and optical glass became unavailable to the RAF
- the Series XV triple-convertible lens for 10×8 inch cameras, favoured by Ansel Adams and others (also see below)
- the Opic and Speed Panchro large-aperture lenses, widely used by Hollywood
- the inverse telephoto (retrofocus) lens, created for use with the early Technicolor process, and now the standard design for wide-angle lenses in 35 mm and other small-format cameras
- high-quality zoom lenses for cinematography and television
- high quality lenses for cinema projectors
Cooke / Taylor-Hobson lens diagrams

Triplet (Taylor, 1893)

Aviar (Warmisham, 1917)

OPIC (Lee, 1920)

Inverted telephoto (Lee, 1930)
