= Zeiss Planar =

Photographic lens designed by Paul Rudolph

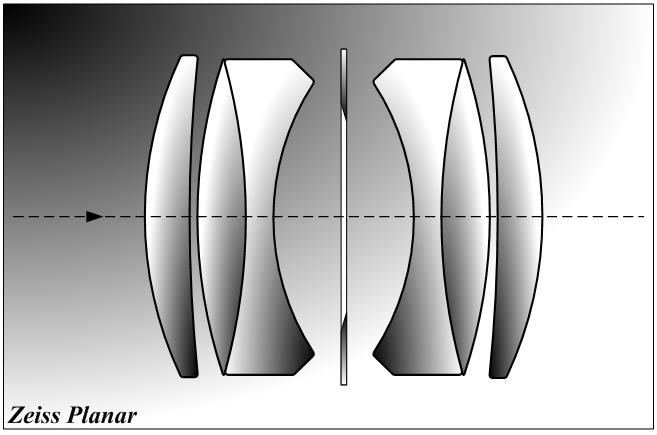
- Introduced in: 1896
- Author: Paul Rudolph
- Construction: 6 elements in 4 groups
- Aperture: f/4.5

The Zeiss Planar is a photographic lens designed by Paul Rudolph at Carl Zeiss in 1896. Rudolph's original was a six-element symmetrical double Gauss lens design.

While very sharp, early versions of the lens suffered from flare due to its many air-to-glass surfaces. Before the introduction of lens coating technology, the four-element Tessar, with slightly inferior image quality, was preferred due to its better contrast. In the 1950s, when effective anti-reflective lens coatings became available, coated Planars were produced with much-improved flare resistance. These lenses used the Zeiss T coating system, which had been invented by Olexander Smakula in 1935. They performed very well as normal and medium-long focus lenses for small and medium format cameras. One of the most notable Planar lenses is the high-speed f/2.0/110 mm lens for the 2000- and 200-series medium format Hasselblad cameras with a similar version available for the Rolleiflex 6000 series cameras.

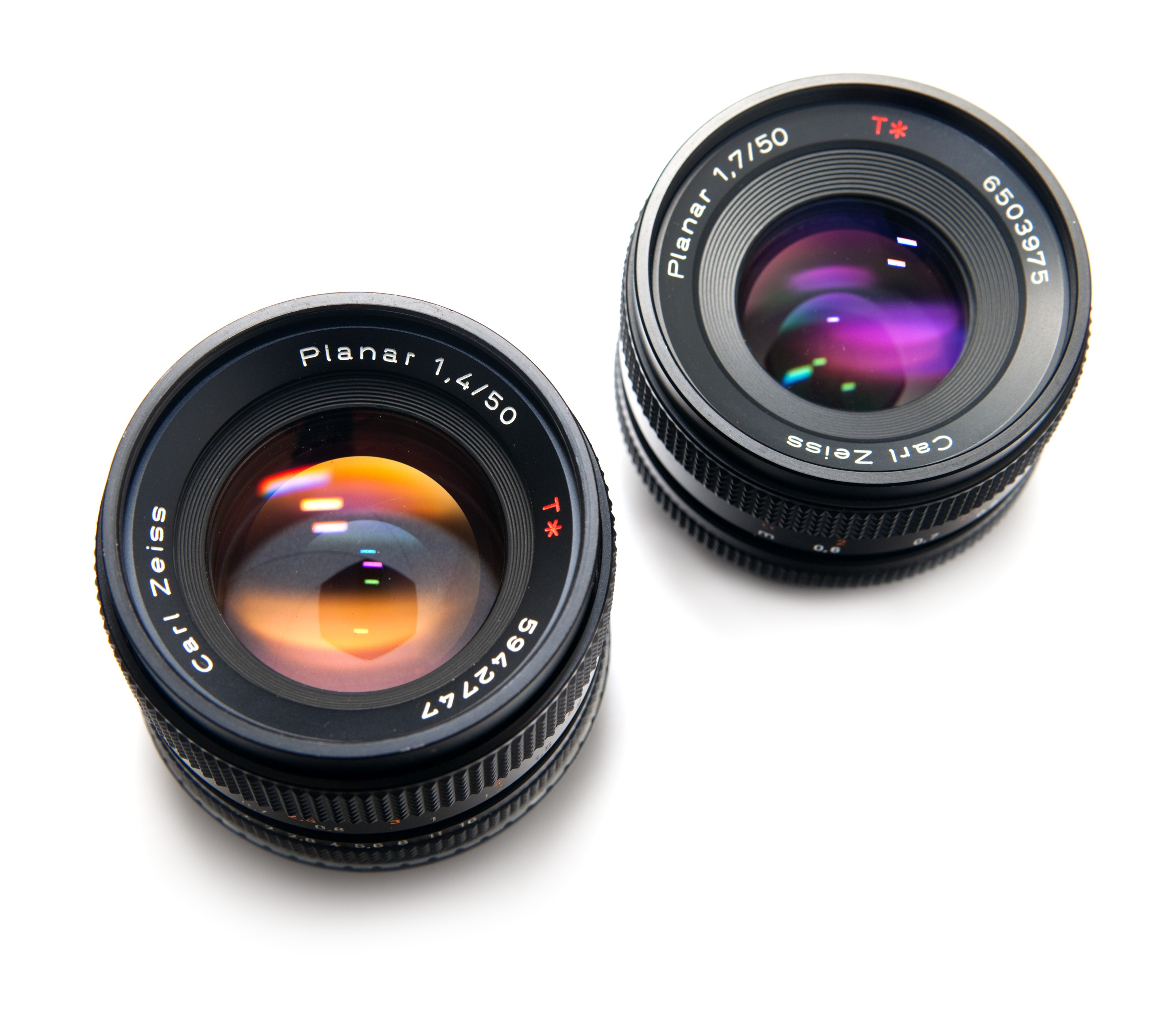
Carl Zeiss T* Planar 50/1.4, 50/1.7

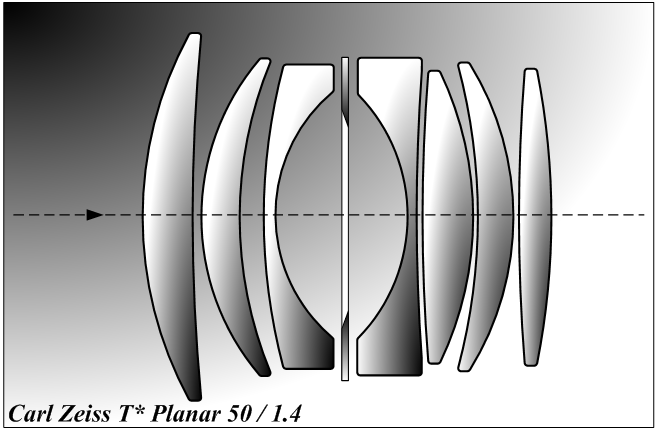
Carl Zeiss T* Planar 50/1.4 lens

== See also ==
- Carl Zeiss Planar 50mm f/0.7
- Biotar
- Tessar
- Sonnar
- Biogon
- Distagon
- Flektogon
- Hologon
- Photographic lens design
