= Normal lens =

Type of photography and cinematography lens

In photography and cinematography, a normal lens is a lens that reproduces a field of view that appears "natural" to a human observer. In contrast, depth compression and expansion with shorter or longer focal lengths introduces noticeable, and sometimes disturbing, distortion.

== Mimicking human vision ==
Photographic technology employs different physical methods from the human eye in order to capture images. Thus, manufacturing optics which produce images that appear natural to human vision is problematic.

The eye has a nominal focal length of approximately 17 mm, but it varies with accommodation. The nature of human binocular vision, which uses two lenses instead of a single one, and post-processing by the cortex is very different from the process of making and rendering a photograph, video or film, and then looking at those.

The structure of the human eye has a concave retina, rather than a flat sensor. This produces effects observed by Abraham Bosse who, in his 1665 illustration To prove that one can neither define nor paint as the eye sees, demonstrated how the circular projection of the visual cone conflicts with the flat plane of the picture surface, prompting continued debate over whether straight lines in the world are perceived as straight or curved in a form of barrel distortion, and whether they should be depicted as straight in the picture plane.

Hermann von Helmholtz's pin-cushioned chessboard figure demonstrates that straight lines in the world are not always perceived as straight and, conversely, that curved lines in the world can sometimes be seen as straight. Furthermore, the retina has variable sensitivity across its wider-than-180° horizontal field of view, as well as differences in resolution between peripheral and foveal vision.

Given these differences between human vision and camera lenses, explanations in photography texts to account for this discrepancy nevertheless tend to gloss over or merely restate the problem in terms of the observed phenomena, or claim that using 50 mm lenses "approximates the angle of view and magnification of human vision", or that "the normal focal length for a given format most closely approximates human sight, and projects an image with the least distortion and compression of space from foreground to background", or that "the perspective is correct and we are most comfortable with a picture captured with a 50-mm lens".

== What is 'normal'? ==
A test of what is a normal lens then, is to find one that renders a printed (or otherwise displayed) photograph of a scene that when held at 'normal' viewing distance (usually arm's length) in front of the original scene and viewed with one eye, matches the real-world and the rendered perspective, though Maurice Pirenne (in 1970) and others demonstrate that it is possible to see a scene made with any lens in normal perspective if one adjusts the viewing distance; but that range becomes impractically close for wide angle photographs or too lengthy for a telephoto, and it requires viewing it from a static point at the centre of perspective from which the image was made, supporting the observations of perspective paintings made by Leonardo da Vinci.

== The image circle ==
A normal lens typically has an angle of view that is close to one radian (~57.296˚) of the optical system's image circle. For 135 format (24 x 36 mm), with an escribed image circle diameter equal to the diagonal of the frame (43.266 mm), the focal length that has an angle of one radian of the inscribed circle is 39.6 mm; the focal length that has an angle of one radian of the horizontally-bound inscribed image circle, is 33 mm; the focal length that has an angle of one radian of the vertically bound inscribed circle, is 22 mm. This correlates with the popularity of 35 and 24 mm lenses, and the existence of 40 mm lenses, albeit the latter in a more restrained offer. A 50 mm lens has a vertical-bound inscribed circle angle of view of ~0.5 radians. A 70 mm focal length has a horizontally-bound inscribed circle angle of view of ~0.5 radians. An 85 mm lens has an enscribed (frame diagonal) circle angle of view of ~0.5 radians. Effectively, the 24, 35 and 40 mm trio have a 1:2 relation to the 50, 70 and 85 trio of focal lengths. "Normal" lenses, those that cover one radian in at least one of their inscribed or escribed image circles, belong to the first group, with 35 and 40 mm lenses closer to one radian than 50 mm lenses.

== Perspective effects of short or long focal-length lenses ==
Lenses with longer or shorter focal lengths produce an expanded or contracted field of view that appears to distort the perspective when viewed from a normal viewing distance. Lenses of shorter focal length are called wide-angle lenses, while longer-focal-length lenses are referred to as long-focus lenses (with the most common of that type being the telephoto lenses). Superimposing a wide-angle image print against the original scene would require holding it closer to the eye, while the telephoto image would need to be placed well into the depth of the photographed scene, or a tiny print to be held at arm's length, to match their perspectives.

Such is the extent of distortions of perspective with these lenses that they may not be permitted as legal evidence.

The ICP Encyclopaedia of Photography notes that for legal purposes:

"Judges will not admit a picture that seems to have been tampered with or that distorts any aspect of the scene [or does not render a normal perspective]...That is, the size relationships of objects in the photograph should be equivalent to what they actually are."

== 'Normal' lenses vary for different formats ==
For still photography, a lens with a focal length about equal to the diagonal size of the film or sensor format is considered to be a normal lens; its angle of view is similar to the angle subtended by a large-enough print viewed at a typical viewing distance equal to the print diagonal; this angle of view is about 53° diagonally. For cinematography, where the image is larger relative to viewing distance, a wider lens with a focal length of roughly a quarter of the film or sensor diagonal is considered 'normal'. The term normal lens can also be used as a synonym for rectilinear lens. This is a completely different use of the term.

== Typical normal focal lengths for different formats ==
=== Film still ===
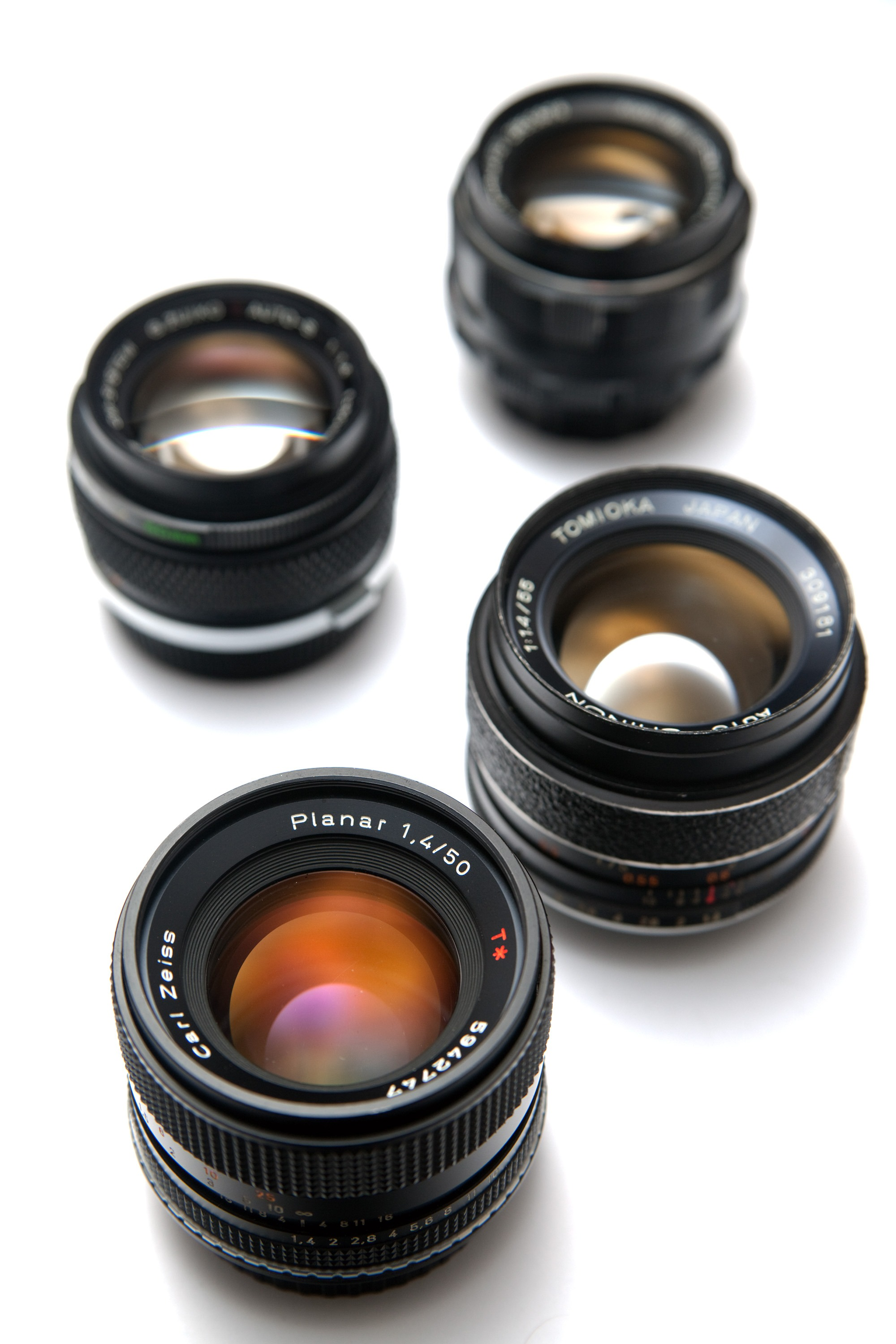
Four "normal" lenses for the 35 mm format.

Typical normal lenses for various film formats for photography are:

Film format	Image dimensions	Image diagonal	Normal lens focal length
9.5 mm Minox	8 × 11 mm	13.6 mm	15 mm
Half-frame	24 × 18 mm	30 mm	30 mm
APS-C	16.7 × 25.1 mm	30.1 mm	28 mm, 30 mm
135, 35 mm	24 × 36 mm	43.3 mm	40 mm, 50 mm, 55 mm
120/220, 6 × 4.5 (645)	56 × 42 mm	71.8 mm	75 mm
120/220, 6 × 6	56 × 56 mm	79.2 mm	80 mm
120/220, 6 × 7	56 × 68 mm	88.1 mm	90 mm
120/220, 6 × 9	56 × 84 mm	101.0 mm	105 mm
120/220, 6 × 12	56 × 112 mm	125.0 mm	120 mm
120/220, 6 x 17	56 x 168 mm	177.1 mm	180 mm
large format 4 × 5 sheet film	93 × 118 mm (image area)	150.2 mm	150 mm
large format 5 × 7 sheet film	120 × 170 mm (image area)	208.0 mm	210 mm
large format 8 × 10 sheet film	194 × 245 mm (image area)	312.5 mm	300 mm

For a 35 mm camera with a diagonal of 43 mm, the most commonly used normal lens is 50 mm, but focal lengths between about 40 and 58 mm are also considered normal. The 50 mm focal length was chosen by Oskar Barnack, the creator of the Leica camera.

Note that the angle of view also depends on the aspect ratio. For example, a "normal" lens on 35 mm does not have the same view as a "normal" lens on 645.

=== Digital still ===
In digital photography, many smaller sensor sizes are specified in terms such as 1" or 2/3". These measurements do not correspond directly to dimensions of the sensor, but rather to dimensions of an equivalent video camera tube (VCT). The normal lens focal length is roughly 2/3 of the video camera tube diameter.

Sensor type	equiv. VCT diameter	Image dimensions	Image diagonal	Normal lens focal length
1/3.6"	7.1 mm	3.0 × 4.0 mm	5.0 mm	5 mm
1/3.2"	7.9 mm	3.4 × 4.5 mm	5.7 mm	5.7 mm
1/3"	8.5 mm	3.6 × 4.8 mm	6.0 mm	6 mm
1/2.7"	9.4 mm	4.0 × 5.4 mm	6.7 mm	6.7 mm
1/2.5"	10.2 mm	4.3 × 5.8 mm	7.2 mm	7 mm
1/2"	12.7 mm	4.8 × 6.4 mm	8.0 mm	8 mm
1/1.8"	14.1 mm	5.3 × 7.2 mm	8.9 mm	9 mm
1/1.7"	14.9 mm	5.7 × 7.6 mm	9.5 mm	9.5 mm
2/3"	16.9 mm	6.6 × 8.8 mm	11.0 mm	11 mm
1"	25.4 mm	9.6 × 12.8 mm	16.0 mm	16 mm
Four Thirds	33.9 mm	13 × 17.3 mm	21.63 mm	22 mm
4/3"	33.9 mm	13.5 × 18.0 mm	22.5 mm	23 mm
APS-C	45.7 mm	15.1 × 22.7 mm	27.3 mm	27 mm
DX	n/a	15.8 × 23.7 mm	28.4 mm	28 mm
FF (35 mm film)	n/a	24 × 36 mm	43.3 mm	50 mm
(6 × 5 cm)	n/a	36.7 × 49.0 mm	61.2 mm	

=== Cinema ===
In cinematography, a focal length roughly equivalent to twice the diagonal of the image projected within the camera is considered normal, since movies are typically viewed from a distance of about twice the screen diagonal.

Film format	Image dimensions	Image diagonal	Normal lens focal length
Standard 8	3.7 × 4.9 mm	6.11 mm	12–15 mm
Single-8 (FUJI)	4.2 × 6.2 mm	7.5 mm	15–17 mm
Super-8	4.2 × 6.2 mm	7.5 mm	15–17 mm
9.5 mm	6.5 × 8.5 mm	10.7 mm	20 mm
16 mm	7.5 × 10.3 mm	12.7 mm	25 mm
35 mm	18.0 × 24.0 mm	30.0 mm	60 mm
35 mm, sound	16.0 × 22.0 mm	27.2 mm	50 mm
65 mm	52.6 × 23.0 mm	57.4 mm	125 mm

== See also ==
- Optics
- Distortion
- Perception
- Visual perception
- Lens design
