= Paul Rudolph (physicist) =

German physicist (1858–1935)

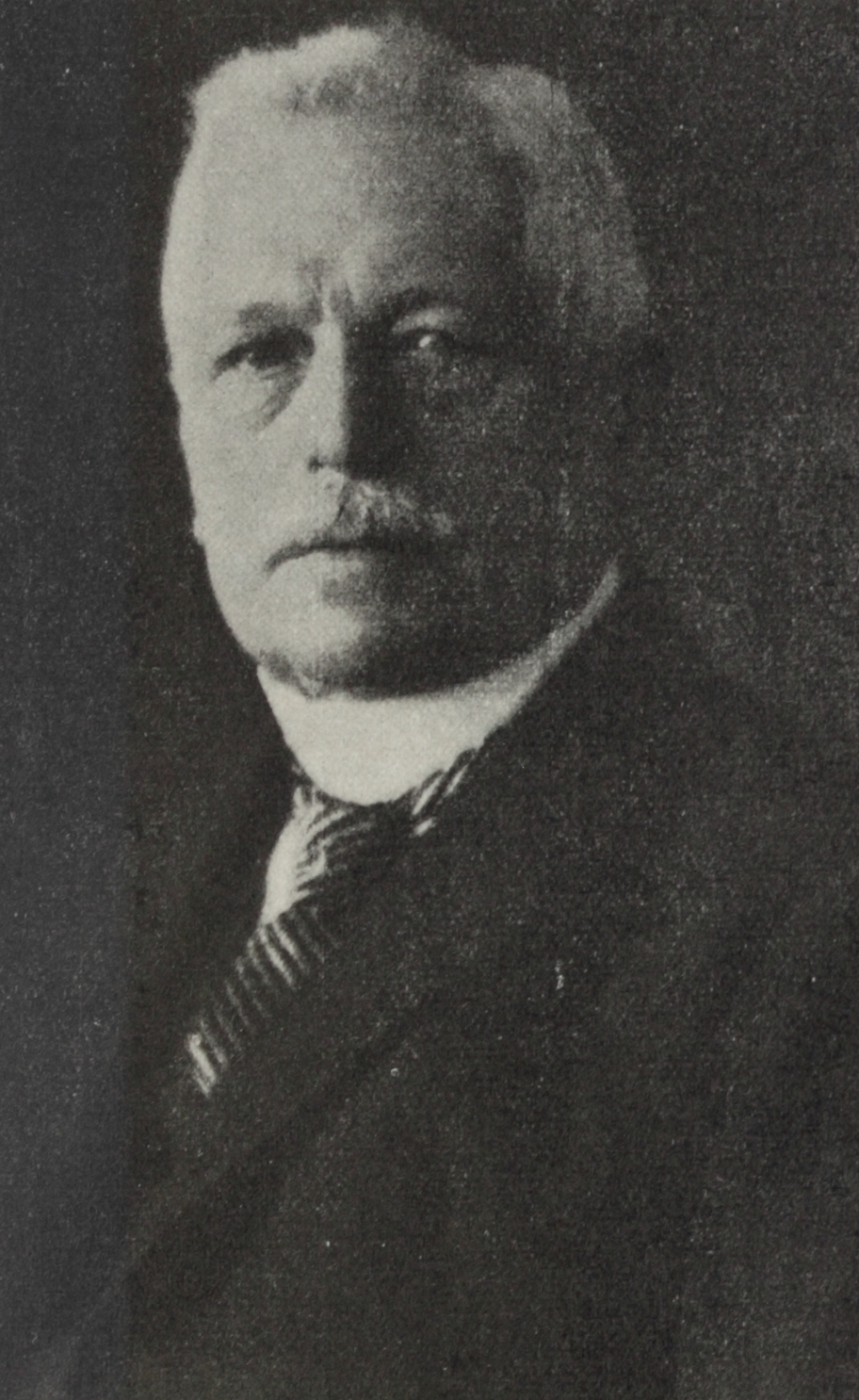

Paul Rudolph's Plasmat lens

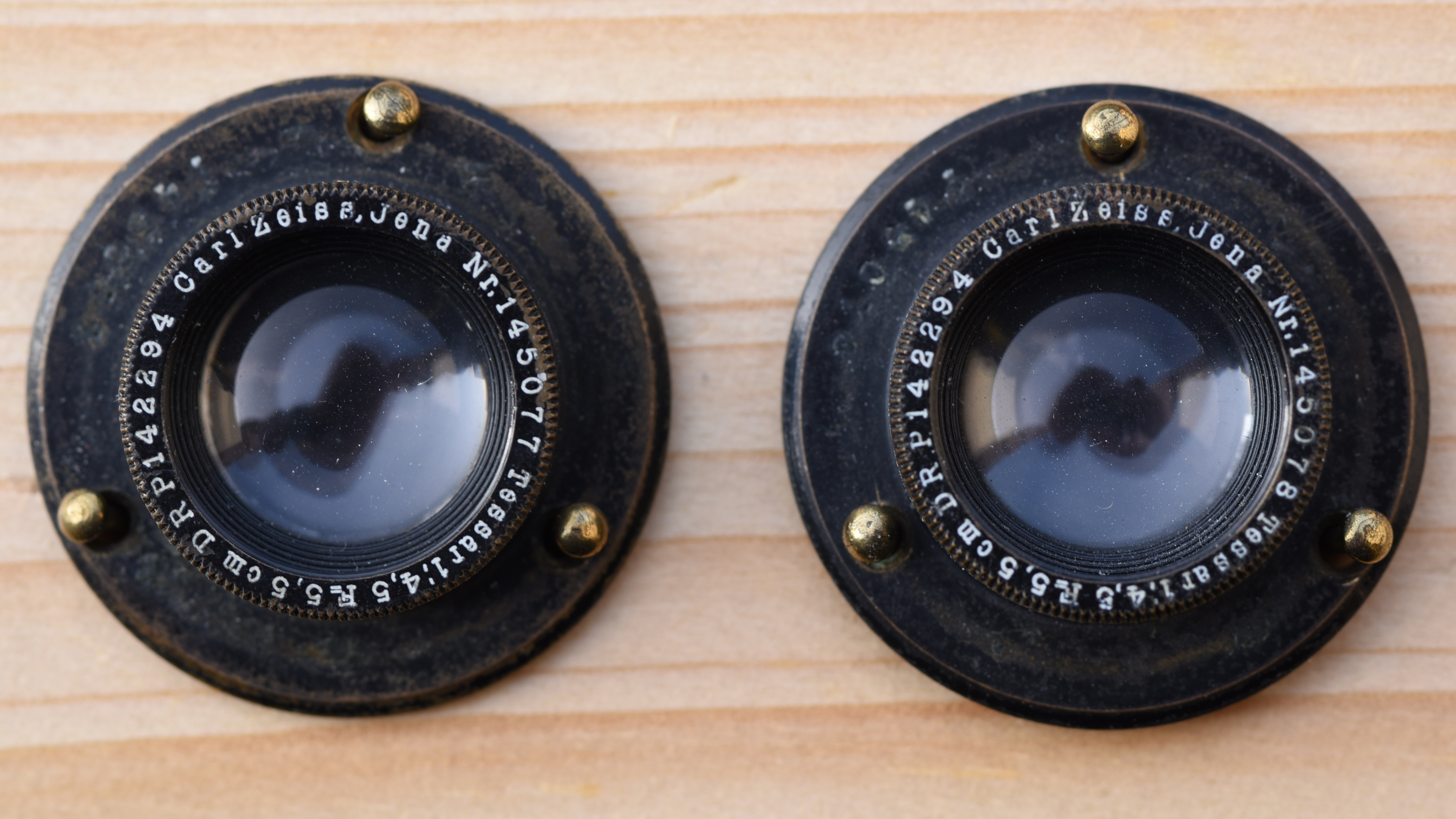
2 historical lenses Carl Zeiss, Jena, Nr. 145077 and Nr. 145078, Tessar 1:4,5 F=5,5cm DRP 142294 (produced before 1910)

Paul Rudolph (14 November 1858 – 8 March 1935) was a German physicist who designed the first anastigmatic lens while working for Carl Zeiss. After World War I, he joined the Hugo Meyer optical company, where he designed most of their cine lenses.

== Work ==
- 1890: First anastigmat lens "protar"
- 1895: Planar design
- 1899: Unar design
- 1902: Tessar design
- 1918: Plasmat design
- 1922: Kino-Plasmat design
- 1926: Makro-Plasmat design
- 1931: Kleinbild-Plasmat design

== See also ==
- Meyer Optik Görlitz
