= Voigtländer Bessa =

Line of folding cameras

Bessa is the best-known line of folding viewfinder and rangefinder cameras manufactured by Voigtländer, which was a dual-format camera that took 6×9 and 4.5×6 pictures on medium format rollfilm. The Bessa was introduced in 1929 and an improved version incorporating a coupled rangefinder was introduced as the Bessa Rangefinder in 1935; the line was supplemented by the single-format Baby Bessa (aka Bessa 46 and Bessa 66), which took 4.5×6 and 6×6 pictures, respectively. Production was interrupted by World War II; after the war, the Bessa resumed limited production, but was succeeded by the Bessa I and Bessa II (both 1950), the latter including a rangefinder. Similar rollfilm cameras manufactured contemporaneously by Voigtländer included the Petito (1924), Rollfilm (1925), Inos (1931), Jubilar (1931), Prominent (1932), and Perkeo (1950, 6×6).

In 1997, the Voigtländer brand was licensed to Cosina, which subsequently introduced an unrelated line of 135 film rangefinder cameras using the Bessa name. However, Cosina also manufactured and sold a folding rangefinder medium format camera as the Bessa III (aka Bessa 667; rebadged and also sold as the Fujifilm GF670) from 2008 to 2014. There also was a version with a rigid body and wide-angle lens sold as the Bessa IIIW.

== Cameras ==
=== Predecessors ===
Voigtländer introduced its first rollfilm cameras in the 1920s; the line eventually included, in increasing order of quality and price, the Petito (1924–27; with 4 1/8-in. f/6.3 Voigtar lens), the Nirvana (with 4 1/8-in. f/6.8 Avus lens), and the Beatrix (with a choice of 4 1/8-in. lenses: f/6.8 Radiar, f/5.5 Dynar, or f/4.5 Heliar). Some cameras featured 5×8 (using 129 film) and 6.5×11 frame sizes.

The Voigtar lens is based on the Cooke triplet design. The Avus is a four-element, three-group design that resembles a reversed Tessar. The Radiar is a typical four-element, four-group symmetric dialyte lens, while the Dynar and Heliar share similar construction, using five elements in three groups, and are considered modifications of the Cooke triplet.

The early rollfilm cameras were carried forward briefly after the introduction of the Bessa with the initial Inos (1931), but later cameras in the Inos series and the Jubilar (1931–34) were simplified Bessa cameras. There also was a 6×9 folding camera with a rangefinder named the Prominent (1932), but this was later renamed and sold under the Bessa Rangefinder brand.

=== Bessa 6×9 ===
Original folding Bessa line

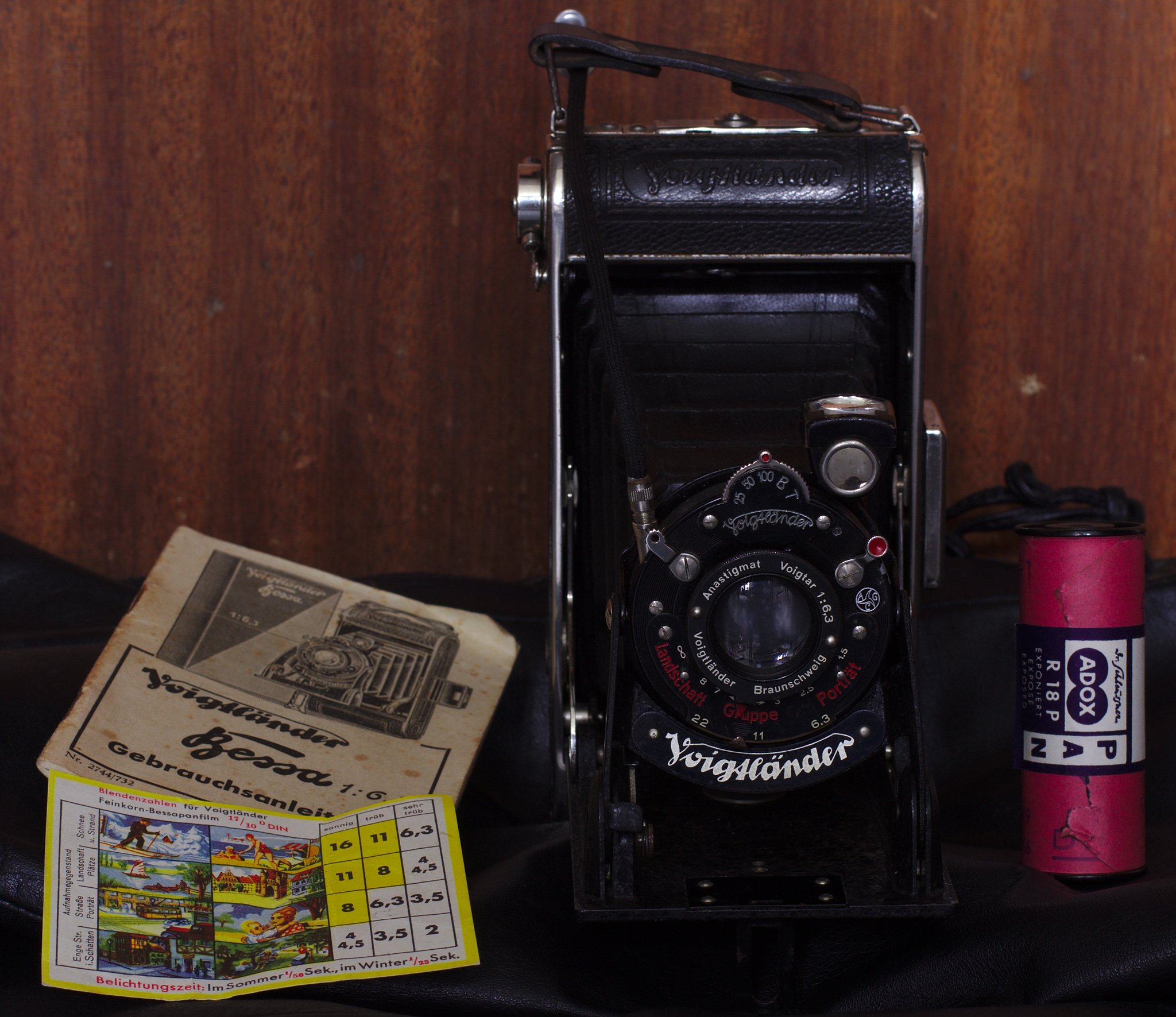
1930 model with Voigtar f/6.3 lens and three-position focusing

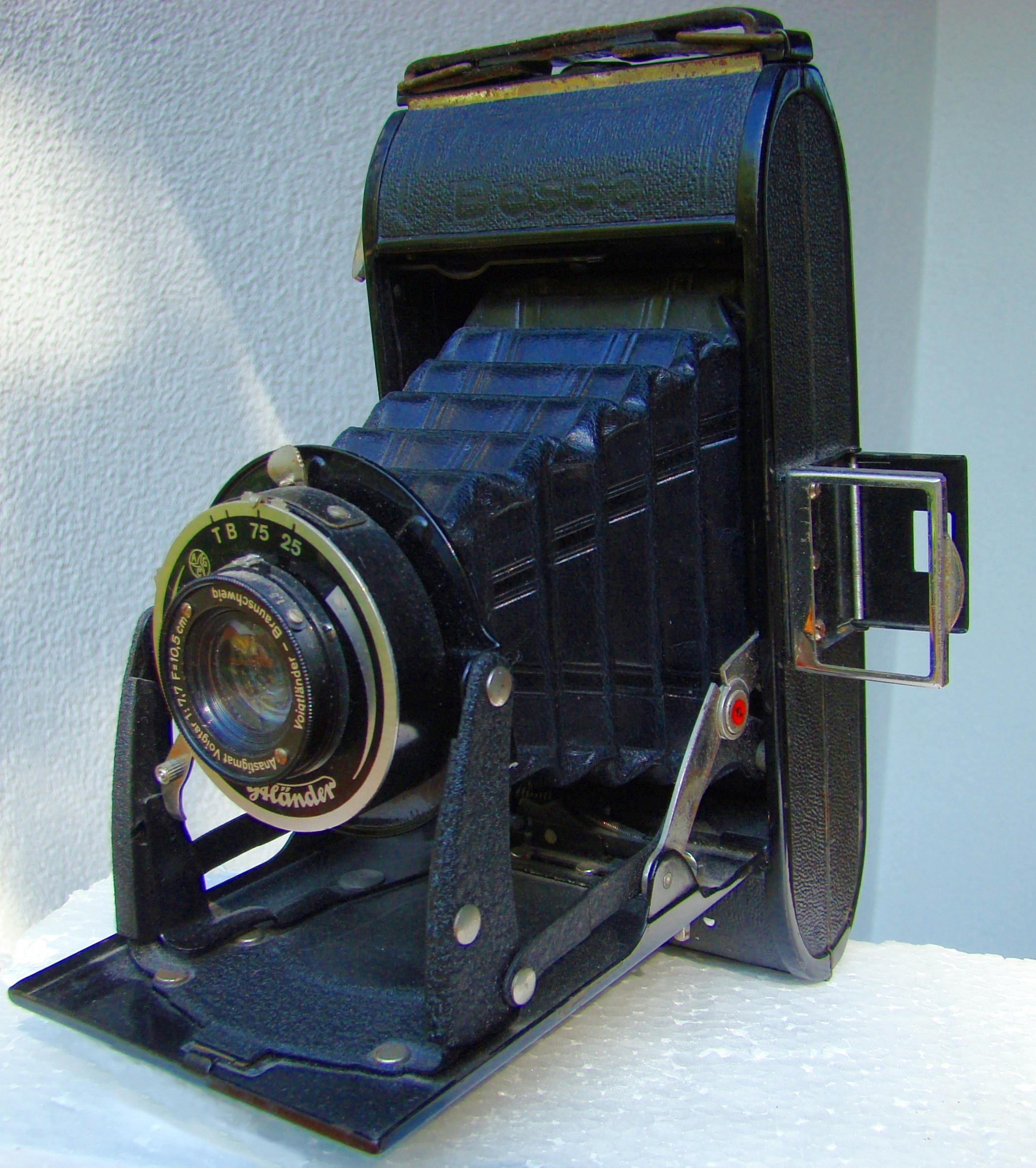
1935 model with Voigtar 10.5 cm f/7.7 lens

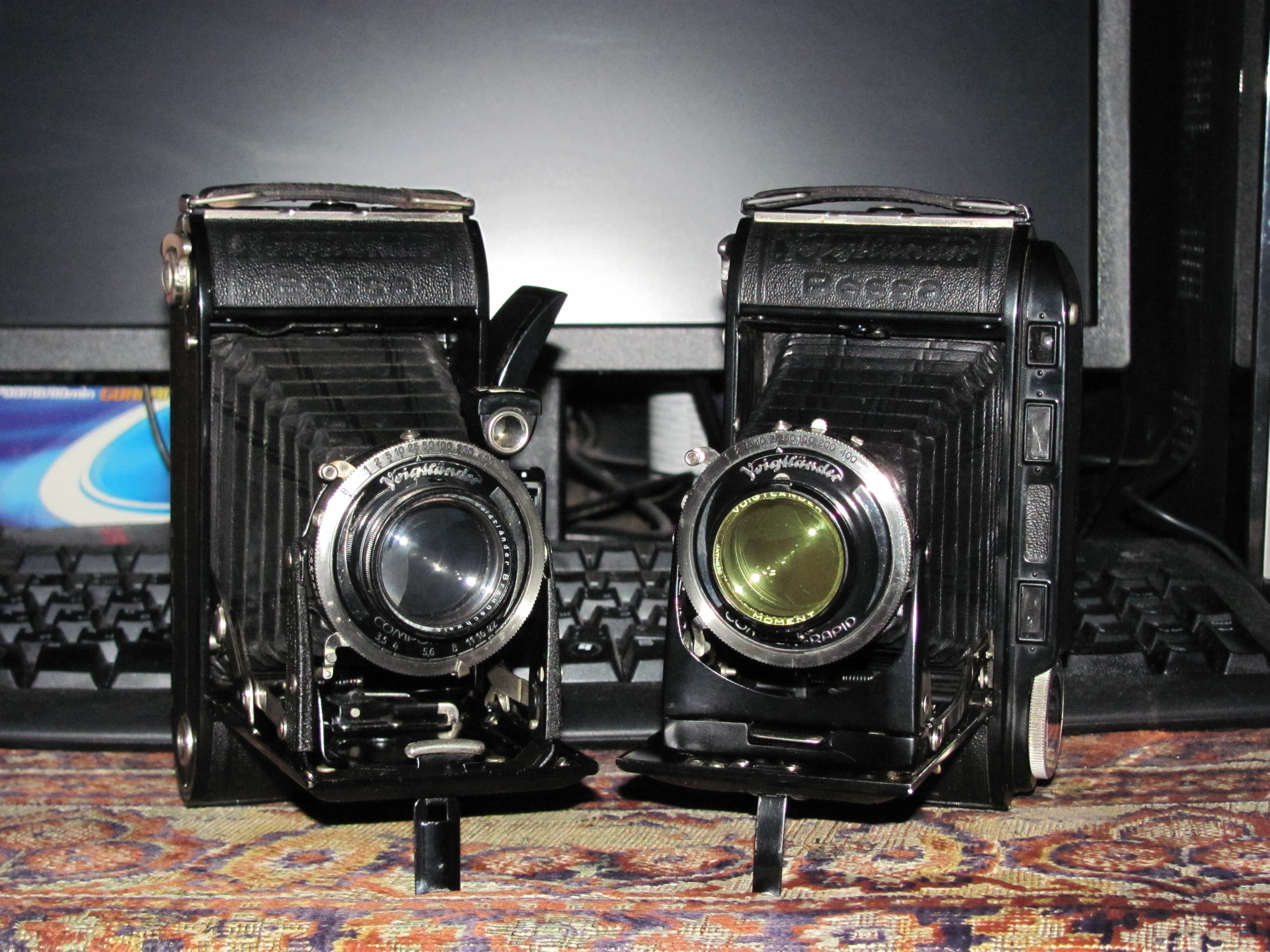
Bessa (left) and Bessa RF (right)

The initial Bessa cameras (1929–30) took 6×9 cm frames on 120 film and used a waist-level finder; a button was used to release the front, which folded down and allowed the lens to extend. These were succeeded by improved versions that added a folding frame finder (1930–35) and dual-format capability (1932–33, 3.4×5.5 cm; then 1935–37, 4.5×6 cm). The 1935 model was the basis for the Bessa Rangefinder, which added improved lenses and a coupled rangefinder to assist in setting focus. Detail improvements were applied to later models, including the removal of the waist-level finder (1942) before production was suspended for World War II. After the war, production resumed until the late 1940s.

Bessa cameras were available with a variety of lenses and shutters. In 1938, the Bessa (non-rangefinder) was available with either Voigtar or Skopar lenses, all with 10.5 cm focal length; the slower f/6.3 and f/7.7 Voigtar lenses were equipped with simpler shutters and three-position scale focusing with settings for Landschaft (landscapes), Gruppe (groups), or Porträt (single person portrait). The faster f/4.5 Skopar lens was based on the Tessar design. Prices ranged from US$16 (equivalent to $370 in 2025) for the Bessa with Voigtar f/7.7 lens to US$47.50 (equivalent to $1,090 in 2025) for the Voigtar f/3.5. The Bessa RF was equipped with a Helomar, Skopar, or Heliar lens, each of which was 10.5 cm and f/3.5, differing in the number of elements in each lens. The most expensive Bessa RF with the Heliar lens was listed at US$80 (equivalent to $1,830 in 2025).

Bessa leaf shutter speeds
Type	1	1/2	1/5	1/10	1/25	1/50	1/75	1/100	1/125	1/150	1/200	1/250	1/400	B	T
Singlo	No	No	No	No	Yes	No	Yes	No	No	No	No	No	No	Yes	Yes
Pronto	No	No	No	No	Yes	Yes	No	Yes	Yes	No	No	No	No	Yes	Yes
Prontor II	Yes	Yes	Yes	Yes	Yes	Yes	No	Yes	No	Yes	No	No	No	Yes	Yes
Compur	Yes	Yes	Yes	Yes	Yes	Yes	No	Yes	No	Yes	No	Yes	No	Yes	Yes
Compur Rapid	Yes	Yes	Yes	Yes	Yes	Yes	No	Yes	No	No	Yes	No	Yes	Yes	Yes

Bessa and Bessa RF lens-shutter combinations
Shutter Lens (10.5 cm)		Singlo	Pronto	Prontor II	Compur	Compur Rapid	Eles.	Grps.
Voigtar	f/7.7	Yes	No	No	No	No	3	3
Voigtar	f/6.3	No	Yes	No	No	No	3	3
Voigtar	f/4.5	No	No	Yes	Yes	Yes	3	3
Voigtar	f/3.5	No	No	No	No	Yes	3	3
Helomar	f/3.5	No	No	No	No	Yes	3	3
Skopar	f/4.5	No	No	No	Yes	Yes	4	3
Skopar	f/3.5	No	No	No	No	Yes	4	3
Heliar	f/3.5	No	No	No	No	Yes	5	3

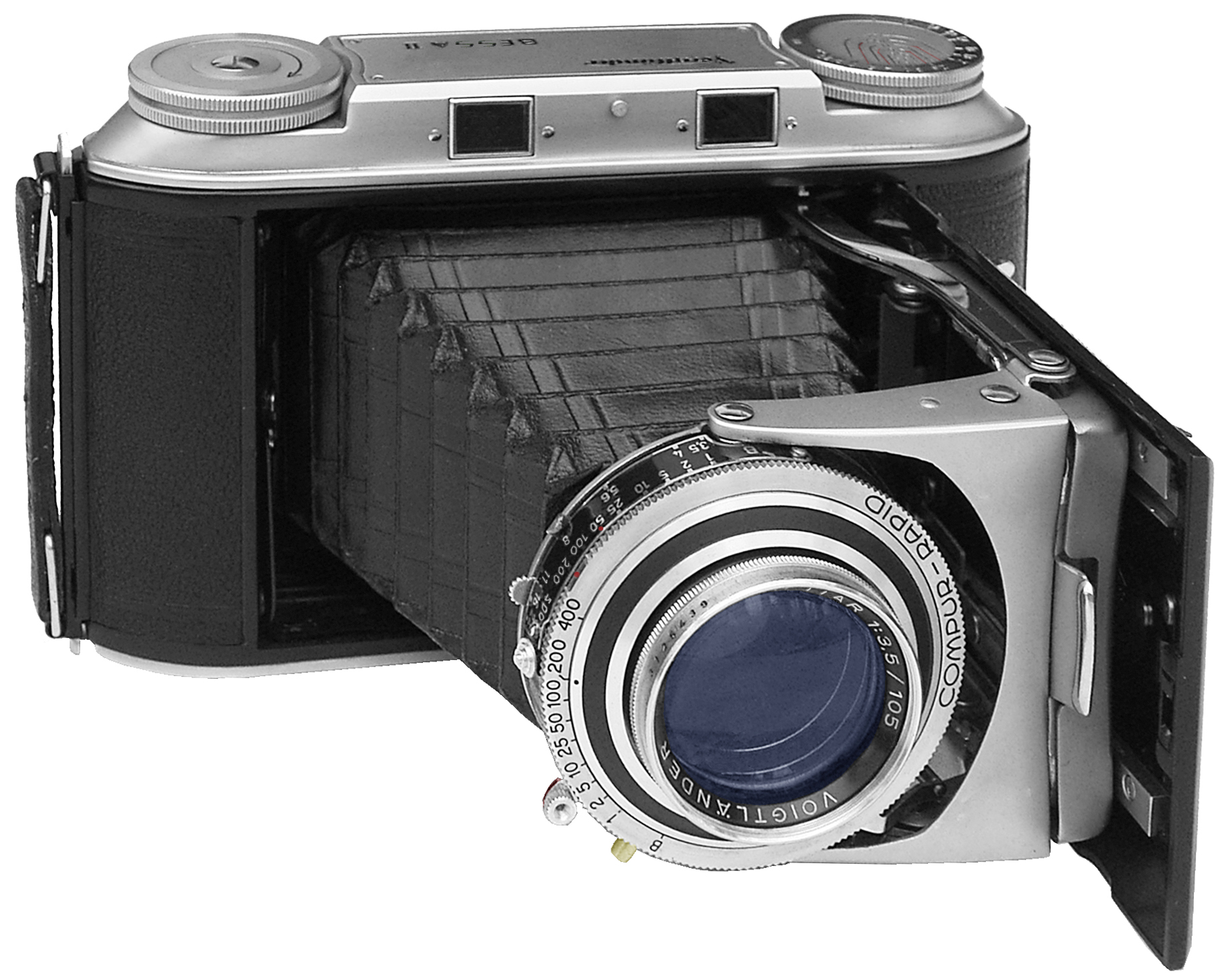
Bessa II, 1950 model with 105 mm f/3.5 Color-Heliar lens

In 1950, the Bessa and Bessa RF were redesigned and sold as the Bessa I and Bessa II, respectively. Production ended in 1956, as the acquisition of Voigtländer by Carl Zeiss AG was completed and the firm began favoring its 135 film camera lines, including the Vito, Vitessa, and Prominent rangefinders and the Bessamatic/Ultramatic SLR lines.

Closed, the Bessa I and II were 6 5/8 in × 4 in × 1 in (168 mm × 102 mm × 25 mm) and 6 5/8 in × 4 in × 2 in (168 mm × 102 mm × 51 mm), respectively. The Bessa I was available with a choice of Vaskar f/4.5 (another Cooke triplet derivative) or Color-Skopar f/3.5 lenses, while the Bessa II was available with the Color-Skopar or Color-Heliar (both f/3.5) lenses. A version of the Bessa II was available with the Apo-Lanthar f/4.5 lens for color photography.

=== Baby Bessa and Perkeo ===
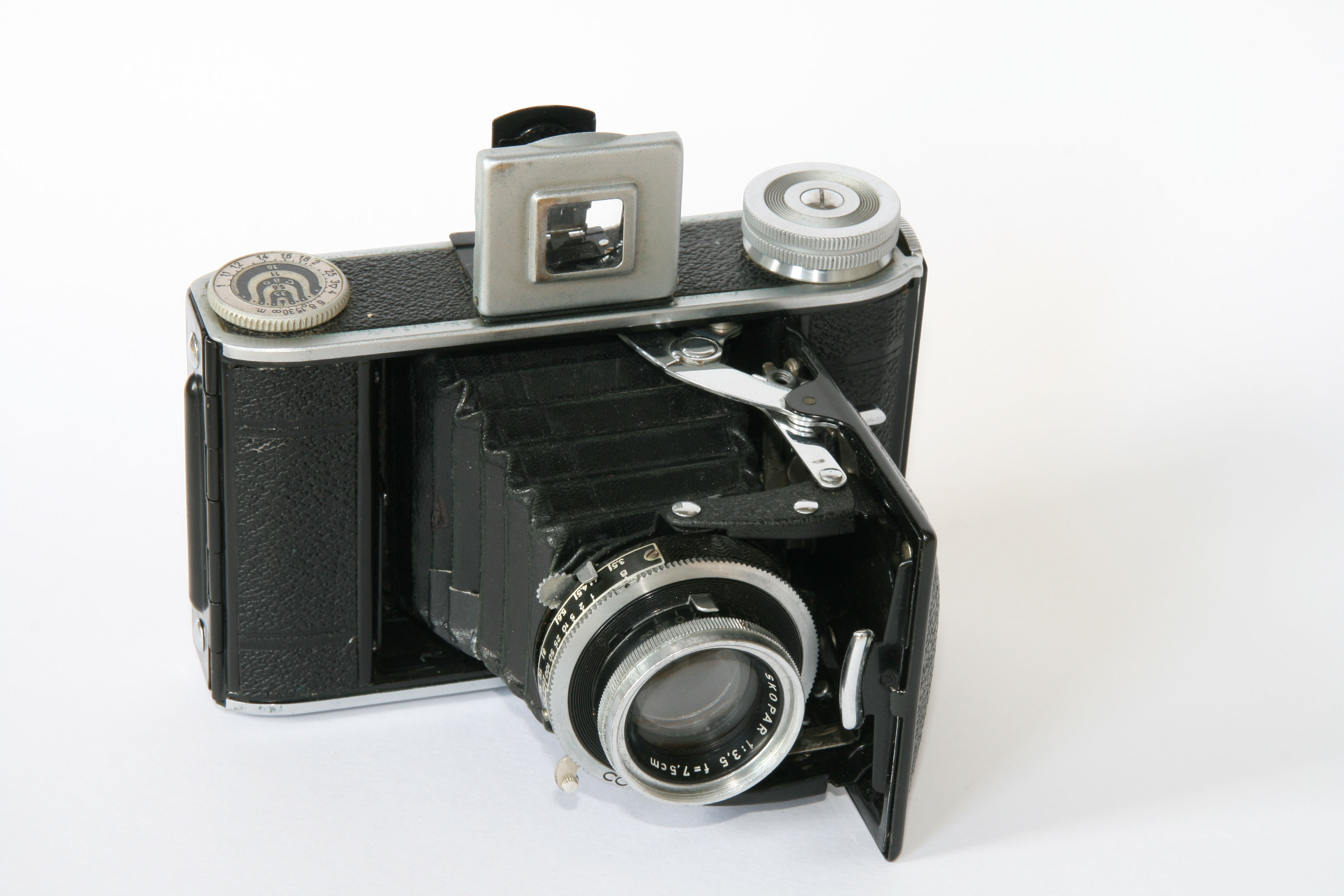
Bessa 66, 1947 model with 7.5 cm f/3.5 Skopar lens

A 127 film folding camera was sold by Voigtländer starting in 1933 as the Perkeo, which took 3×4 cm pictures; it offered greater portability compared to the regular Bessa line. It was succeeded by the single-format Bessa 46 and Bessa 66 cameras, introduced in 1938 and sold until 1951, which took pictures in 645 and 6×6 formats, respectively, using 120 film. These so-called "Baby Bessa" cameras never were sold with a coupled rangefinder. Post-war Bessa 66 cameras were available with coated lenses, either a 75 mm f/4.5 Vaskar for US$49.50 (equivalent to $820 in 2025) or a f/3.5 Color-Skopar for US$64.50 (equivalent to $1,060 in 2025). Production of the Bessa 46 was not resumed after the war, as the 645 format was available with the regular Bessa.

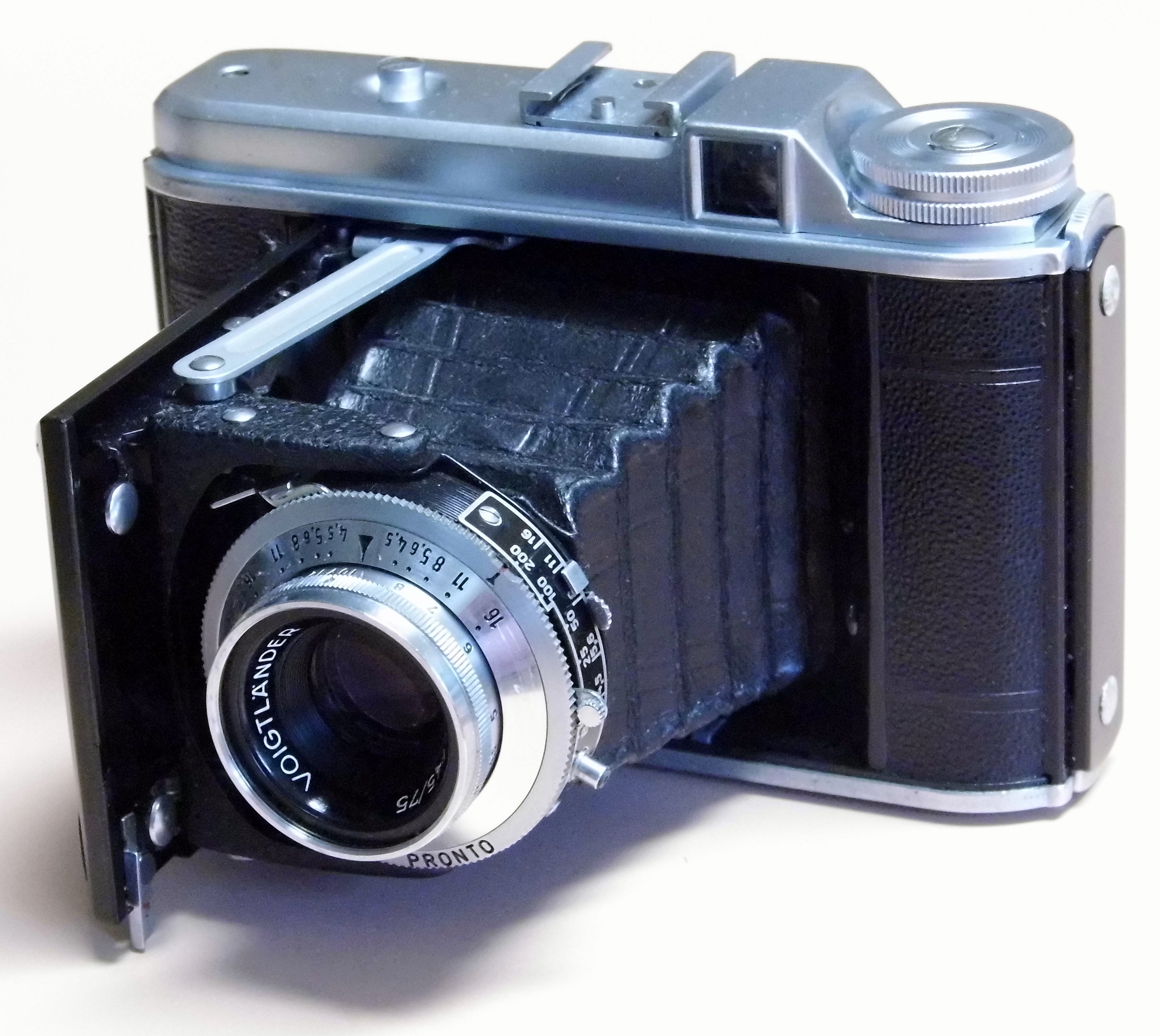
Perkeo I, 1950 model with 75 mm f/4.5 Vaskar lens

The Bessa 66 was updated alongside the Bessa 6×9 line and reintroduced under the revived Perkeo name starting in 1950 (6×6 format), including the Perkeo E, which added a coupled rangefinder. The Perkeo was 5 in × 3 1/2 in × 1 3/4 in (127 mm × 89 mm × 44 mm) when closed and was available in two models: the Perkeo I was equipped with a 75 or 80 mm f/4.5 Vaskar triplet, while the Perkeo II had the upgraded 80 mm f/3.5 Color-Skopar. The rangefinder-equipped Perkeo E was introduced by 1954.

In approximately 1955, shortly after Voigtländer was acquired by the Carl Zeiss Foundation, the Perkeo line was discontinued.

=== Bessa III (Cosina) ===
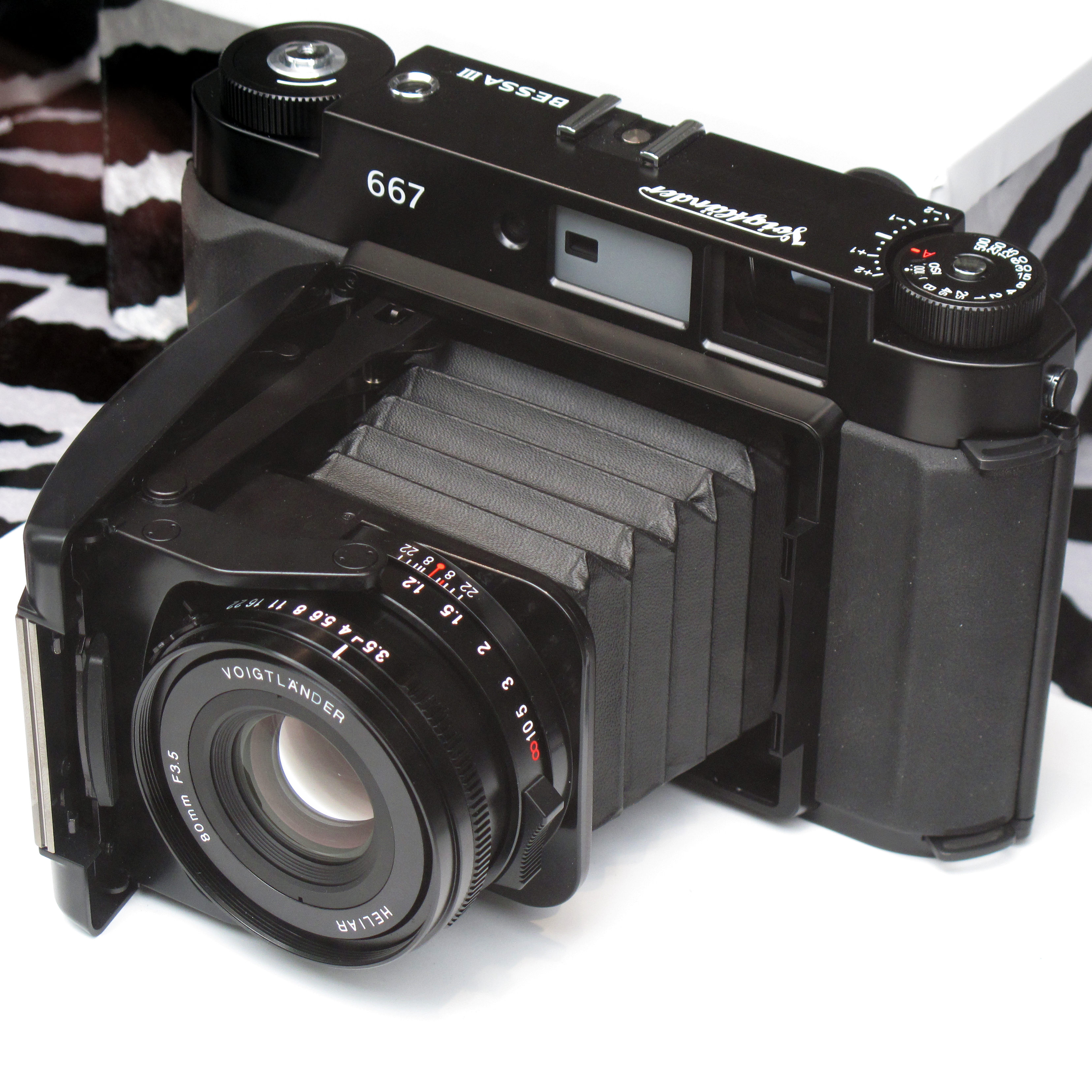
Bessa III, 2008 model with 80 mm f/3.5 Heliar lens

After the Voigtländer name was licensed to Cosina, the Bessa III aka Bessa 667 was released in 2008, which offered dual-format (6×7 and 6×6) images in a folding body with a coupled rangefinder that adjusts for parallax. A rebadged version was sold by Fujifilm as the GF670. Later, a wide-angle version was sold, omitting the folding ability, as the 667W, with a 55 mm f/4.5 Color-Skopar lens. The Bessa III line was discontinued in 2014.
