= Voigtlander 90mm F3.5 APO-Lanthar SL II =

- Maker: Voigtlander
- Lens mount(s): Canon EF, Nikon F (FX), Pentax KAF

Technical data
- Type: Prime
- Focal length: 90mm
- Aperture (max/min): f/3.5
- Close focus distance: 0.50 metres (1.6 ft)
- Max. magnification: 0.29
- Diaphragm blades: 9
- Construction: 7 elements in 5 groups

Features
- Manual focus override: No No
- Weather-sealing: No No
- Lens-based stabilization: No No
- Aperture ring: Yes Yes

Physical
- Max. length: 52 millimetres (2.0 in)
- Diameter: 63 millimetres (2.5 in)
- Weight: 320 grams (0.71 lb)
- Filter diameter: 52mm

History
- Introduction: 2010

The Voigtlander 90mm F3.5 APO-Lanthar SL II is an interchangeable camera lens announced by Voigtlander on February 17, 2010.
