= Voigtländer Vito =

35mm rangefinder camera

Vito
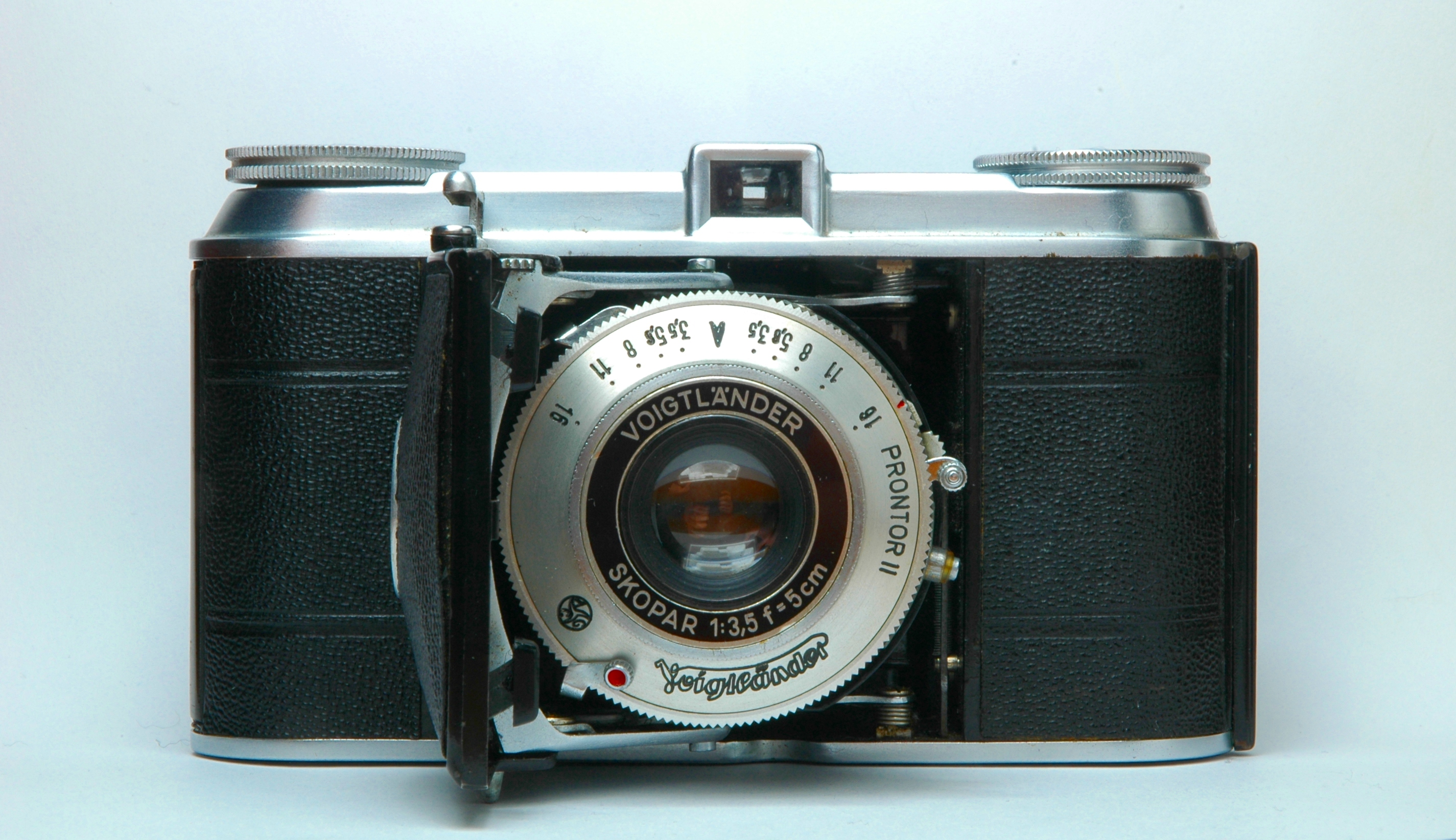
- Post-war Vito [I] with Skopar 50 mm f/3.5 lens (Tessar-type) and Prontor shutter

Overview
- Maker: Voigtländer
- Type: 35mm view/rangefinder camera

Lens
- Lens mount: fixed

Focusing
- Focus: manual

Exposure/metering
- Exposure: manual

Shutter
- Shutter: Compur and Prontor leaf
- Shutter speeds: 1–1/300 or 1/500 + B, X/M

General
- Dimensions: 5 1/8 in × 2 7/8 in × 1 5/8 in (130 mm × 73 mm × 41 mm) (II, closed)
- Weight: 16 oz (450 g) (II)

The Vito and Vitomatic, Vitoret, and Vito Automatic were several related lines of 35 mm compact viewfinder and rangefinder cameras made by Voigtländer from the 1940s through the early 1970s, equipped with leaf shutters, similar in concept to and marketed against the competing Kodak Retina cameras manufactured by Kodak. All of these cameras were fixed-lens models; the models in the Vito line identified with Roman numerals were equipped with folding mechanisms and collapsible lenses for portability, while the others were rigid, non-folding cameras.

Within the Voigtländer lineup of 35 mm film cameras, the Vito were a simplified camera line aimed at amateur photographers; the high-end Prominent (135) were rangefinders meant for professionals, and the mid-range Vitessa were available with an expanded selection of mostly fixed lenses for advanced amateurs. Voigtländer also offered a line of single lens reflex cameras, the Bessamatic/Ultramatic.

After the Voigtländer brand was acquired by Carl Zeiss AG in 1956, the Vito line continued to be marketed to amateur photographers, spawning sub-lines with simplified, semi-autoexposure controls (Vitomatic and Vito Automatic) and smaller sizes (Vitoret). Zeiss Ikon ceased camera production in 1971, and the Vito/Vitomatic/Vitoret brands have been licensed and revived several times since then, including for 110 film (1970s Vitoret 110, by Rollei) and 35 mm (various point-and-shoot cameras, in the 1980s by Balda and again in the 1990s by Samsung).

== Cameras ==
=== Folding Vito (Roman) ===
The first Vito cameras are identified with Roman numerals to distinguish the different models. The Vito [I] was released in 1940 with a Compur leaf shutter and Skopar lens, which was derived from the Zeiss Tessar. Few examples were made as World War II began absorbing German production. A new version of the Vito [I] was issued in 1947 with a Prontor shutter, after the war.

Voigtländer Vito (Roman numeral) viewfinder cameras

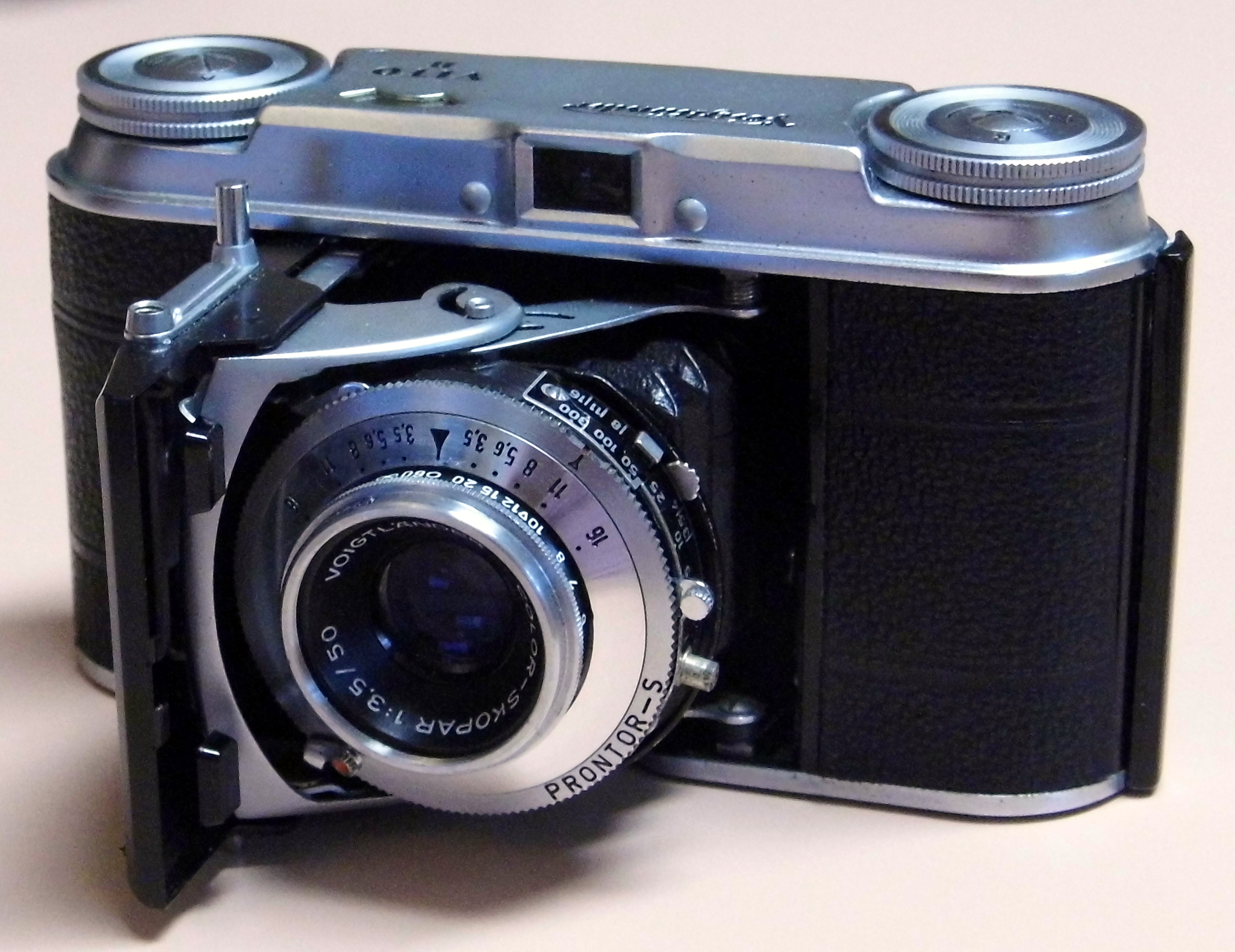
Vito II (1950)

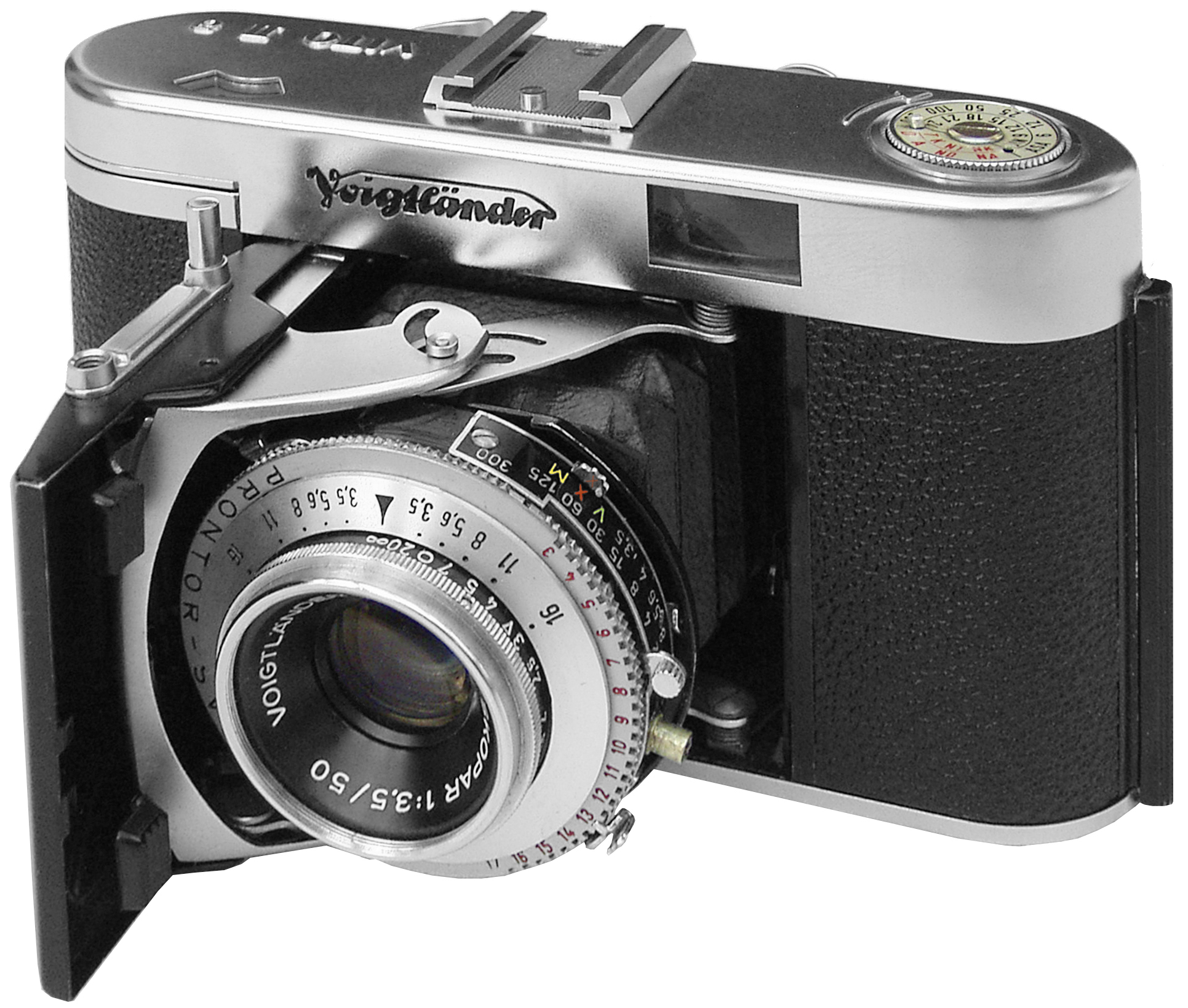
Vito IIa (1955)

These were succeeded by the Vito II (1950), Vito III (1951), and Vito IIa (1955).

The II can be distinguished by a larger top cover, which lacks the viewfinder protrusion; it was initially released without an accessory shoe, but one was later integrated into the top plate. The post-war lens, a 50 mm f/3.5, was given the Color-Skopar designation. Versions are available with a Prontor (minimum shutter speed of 1/300 s) or Synchro-Compur (1/500 s) shutter.

The III uses a drop-down bed for the folding mechanism, while earlier Vito cameras use a side-hinged mechanism; it also includes an integrated, coupled rangefinder and a faster 50 mm f/2.0 Ultron lens, shared with the Vitessa and Prominent (135); controls and handling are similar to the Prominent.

The IIa has one top-deck knob (the other Vito cameras with Roman numerals have two) and can be identified by its enlarged viewfinder window; it shares the Color-Skopar lens with the earlier II. It has a similar appearance to the contemporary (lettered) Vito models.

==== Point and shoot Vito (Balda) ====
The Vito name was revived in the 1980s for a line of plastic-bodied point-and-shoot cameras (P&S) similar in appearance and functionality to the Minox 35 line, with a fold-down lens cover. The P&S Vito was built by Balda. Unlike the earlier folding Vito line, the P&S Vito used wider-than-normal lenses, branded either Color Voigtar (P&S Vito, 38 mm f/5.6) or Color Skopar (P&S Vito C and Vito CS, 38 mm f/2.8).

The vito 35 was developed by Karl-Heinz Lange while Voigtländer was owned by Rollei; when Rollei sold the Voigtländer brand in 1981, Lange moved to Balda, where he designed the P&S Vito, which also was sold under additional brand names, including the Balda CA 35 and Revue 35XE. These are zone-focus cameras with program autoexposure. A side-mounted flash is available for these cameras.

P&S Vito (Balda) models
Years	Model	Light meter	Rangefinder	Lens	Image	Notes
1981	C	Yes, CdS	No	Color Skopar 38 mm f/2.8		Also sold as Balda CA 35 with Baldanon lens and Revue 35XE with Revuenon lens
1982–84	CS	Yes, CdS	No	Color Skopar 38 mm f/2.8		Adds self-timer; also sold as Balda CE 35
1983–85	—	Yes, CdS	No	Color Voigtar 38 mm f/5.6		

=== Rigid Vito (letter) ===
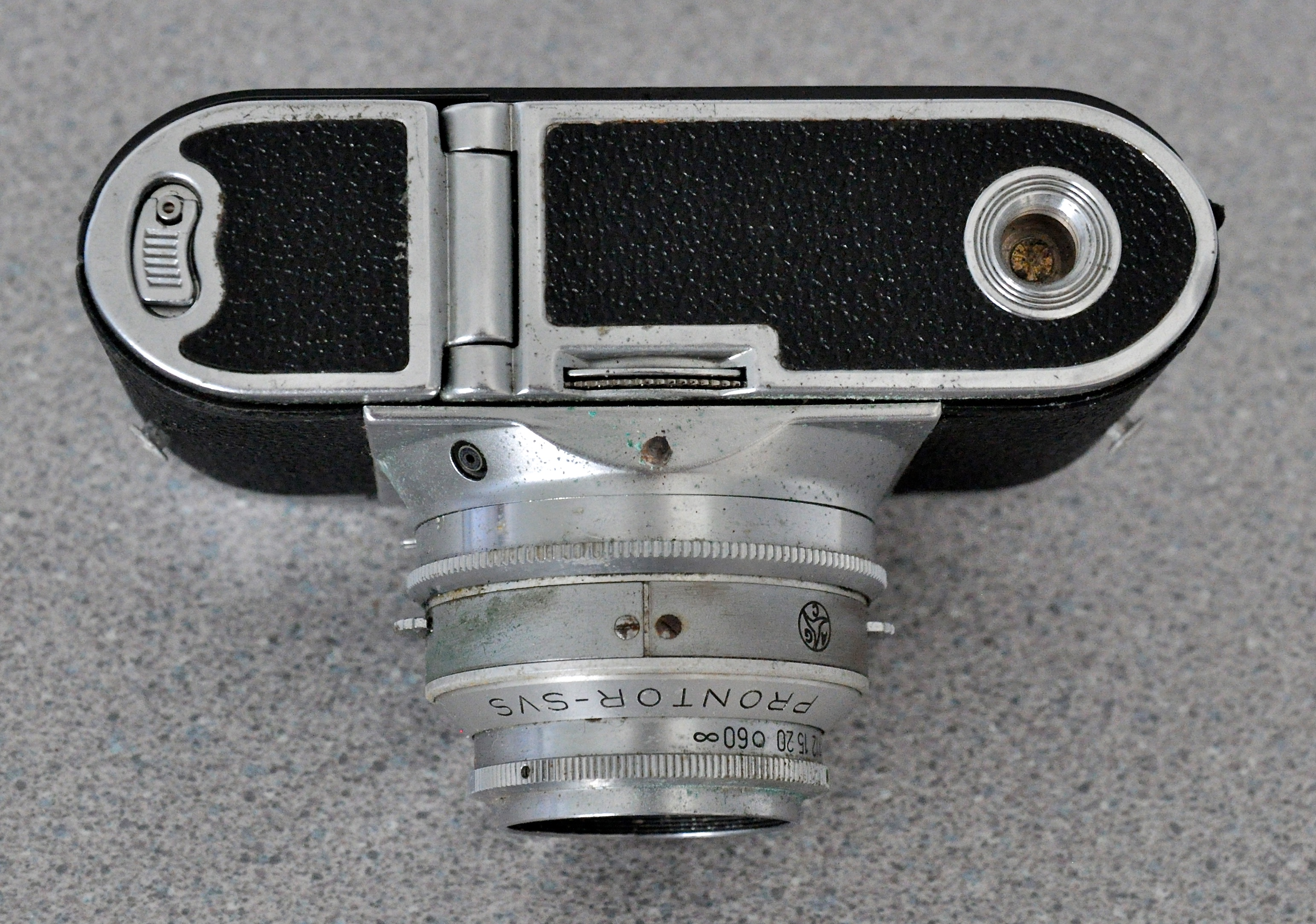
Bottom plate of Vito B, showing hinged section for film access

The lettered Vito camera models eschewed the folding mechanism in favor of a rigid, fixed lens, trading some portability for simplified operation. The earlier Vito B line (1954–58) uses a novel base plate design for film loading, while the succeeding Vito C line (1959–68) uses a standard swing-open back. The B was equipped with one of two Color-Skopar 50 mm lenses (either f/2.8 or f/3.5) and the Pronto or Prontor SVS shutter had a minimum shutter speed of 1/200 or 1/300, respectively. C models were equipped with Lanthar or Color-Skopar lenses (both 50 mm f/2.8); there are some variations in the color of the bezel around the meter, rangefinder, and viewfinder window.

Multiple variants of the lettered Vito cameras were made with and without light meters and/or rangefinders.

Vito (lettered) models
Years	Model	Light meter	Rangefinder	Image
1954–58	B	No	No	
1954–58	BL	Yes	No	
1954–58	BR	No	Yes	
1959–68	C	No	No	
1959–68	CD	Yes, uncoupled selenium	No	
1959–68	CL	Yes, coupled selenium	No	
1959–68	CLR	Yes, coupled selenium	Yes	
1959–68	CS	Yes, coupled CdS	No	
1959–68	CSR	Yes, coupled CdS	Yes	

==== VF ====
Voigtländer VF compact rangefinder cameras and antecedents

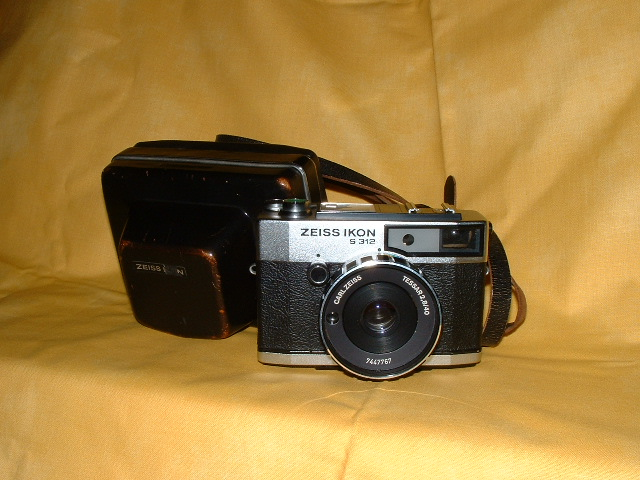
Zeiss Ikon S 312 (1971)

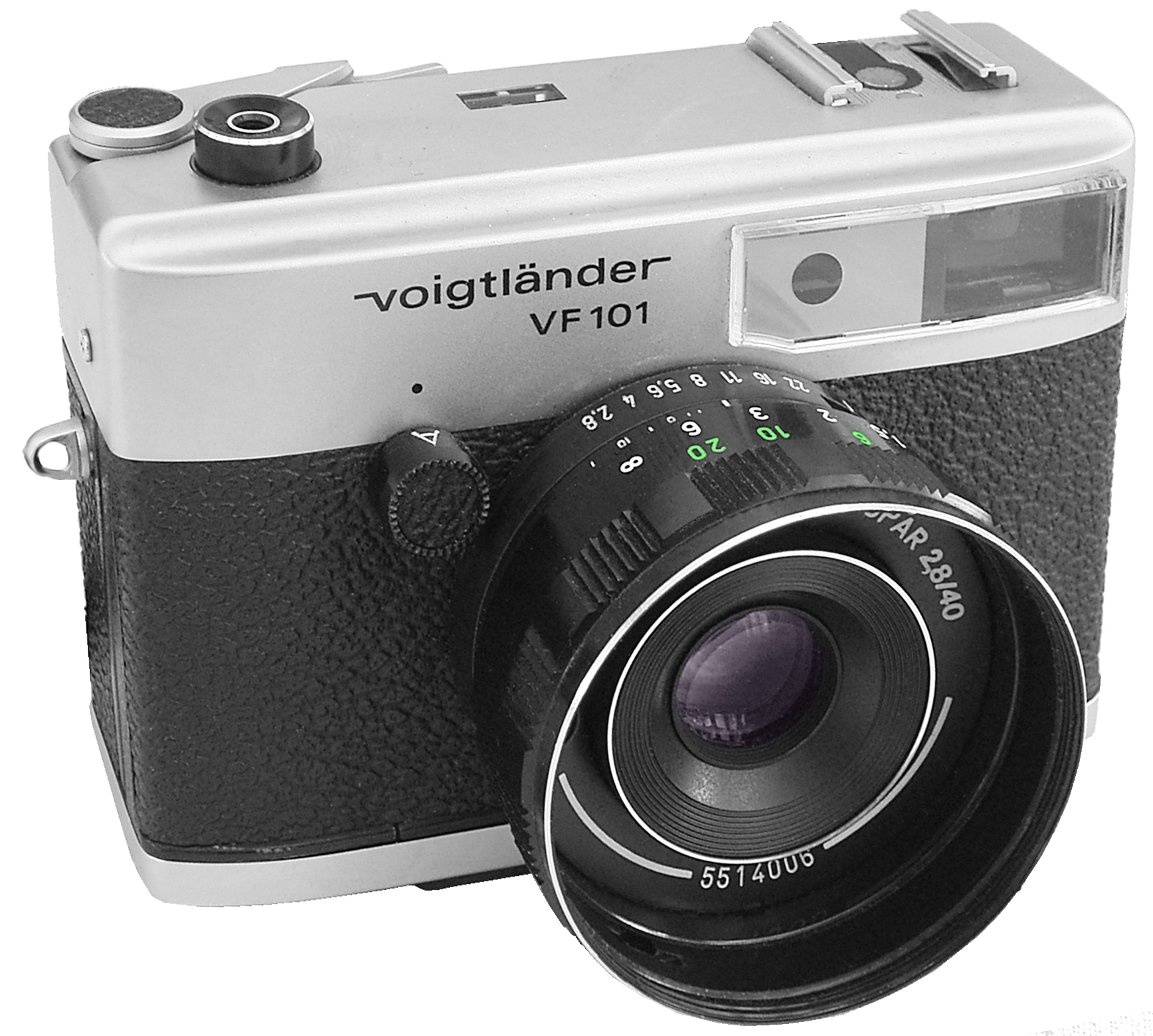
VF 101 (1974)

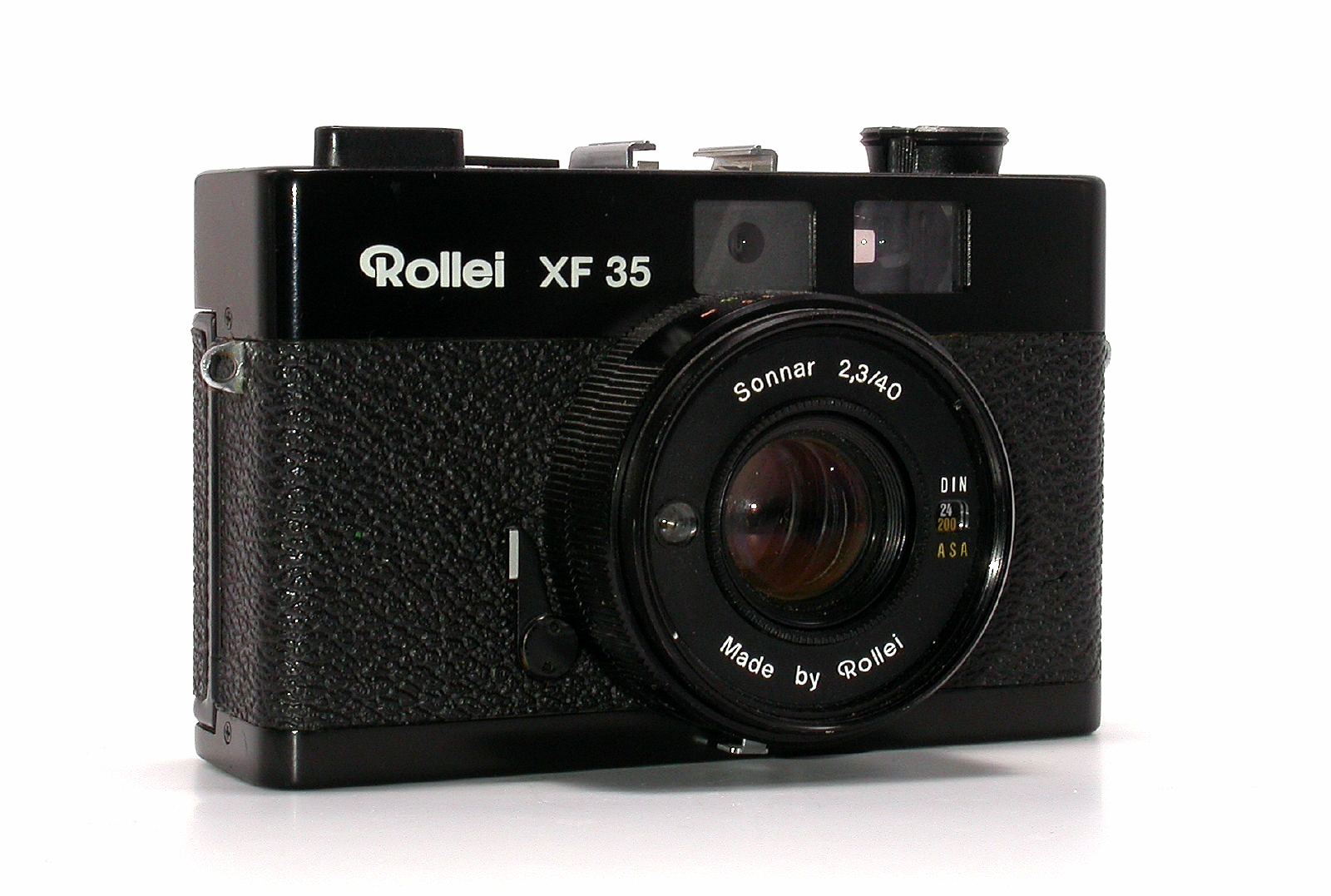
Rollei XF35 (1974)

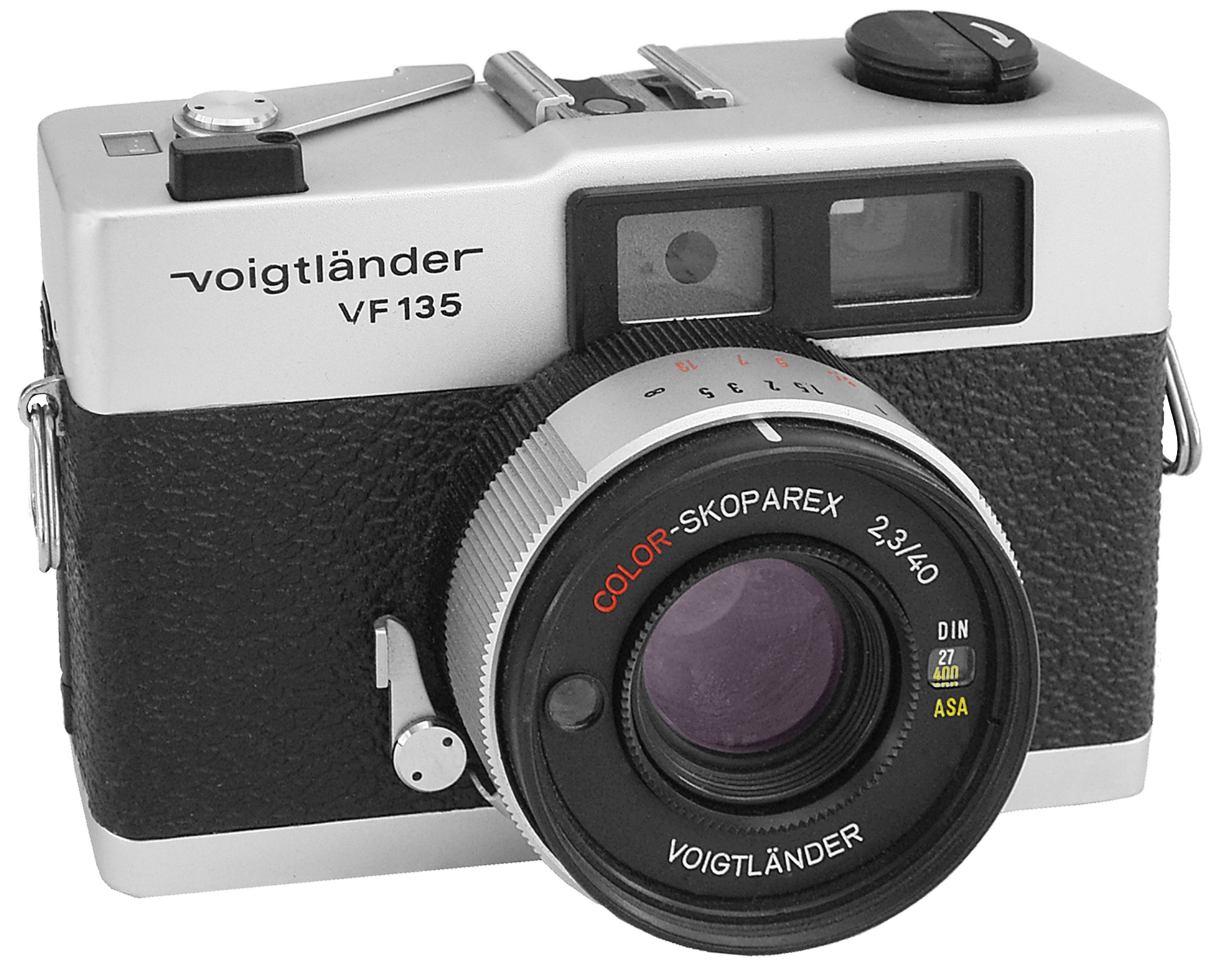
VF 135 (1976)

In the 1970s, Rollei acquired the Voigtländer brand from Zeiss and released several compact rangefinder cameras under the VF series, some of which also were sold as Rollei-branded cameras. The first model in the VF series was the VF 101 (1974), a close copy of the Zeiss Ikon/Contessa S 312 (1971), one of the last cameras that had been developed and sold by Zeiss. The next model was VF 135 (1976), a slightly modified version of the earlier Rollei XF35 (1974). The final model was developed by Rollei and sold as the VF 35 F (1981) with an integrated, pop-up electronic flash unit.

=== Vitomatic ===
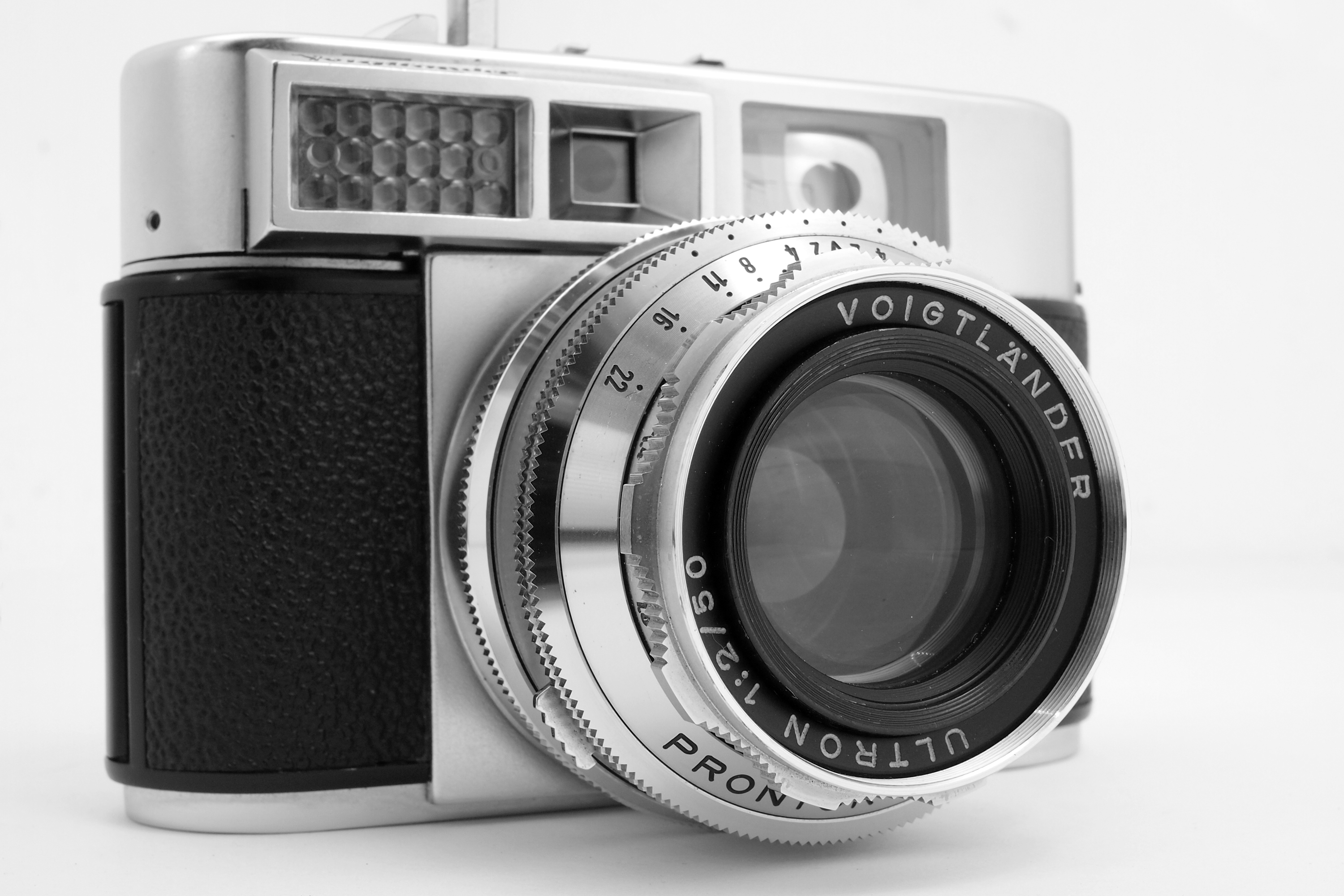
Vitomatic IIa with Ultron lens

Towards the end of Vito B production, Voigtländer began releasing the Vitomatic line, which simplified the controls by adding match-needle metering with a combined shutter speed/aperture selector ring and scale focusing, although manual aperture, shutter speed, and focusing distance selection are still possible. These were made in three sub-generations:

1. I/II and Ia/IIa
2. Ib/IIb/IIIb
3. ICS/IICS/IIICS

Vitomatic models
Years	Model	Light meter	Rangefinder	Lens	Image	Notes
1957	I	Yes, selenium	No	Color-Skopar 50 mm f/2.8		
1958	II	Yes, selenium	Yes	Color-Skopar 50 mm f/2.8		
1960	Ia	Yes, selenium	No	Color-Skopar 50 mm f/2.8		
1960	IIa	Yes, selenium	Yes	Color-Skopar 50 mm f/2.8		
1961	IIa	Yes, selenium	Yes	Ultron 50 mm f/2.0		
1965	Ib	Yes, selenium	No	Color-Skopar 50 mm f/2.8		
1965	IIb	Yes, selenium	Yes	Color-Skopar 50 mm f/2.8		
1965	IIIb	Yes, selenium	Yes	Ultron 50 mm f/2.0		
1966	ICS	Yes, CdS	No	Color-Skopar 50 mm f/2.8		
1966	IICS	Yes, CdS	Yes	Color-Skopar 50 mm f/2.8		
1966	IIICS	Yes, CdS	Yes	Ultron 50 mm f/2.0		

In general, Vitomatic I cameras had a viewfinder, while the corresponding Vitomatic II models added a coupled rangefinder, and Vitomatic III cameras were similar to the II with the addition of the faster Ultron lens. Early Vitomatic (I/II) cameras were equipped with a Prontor SLK-V leaf shutter (minimum speed 1/300 s) and the 50 mm f/2.8 Color-Skopar lens; the improved Ia/IIa shortened the minimum speed to 1/500 s. In addition, the IIa was optionally available with the Ultron, and as previously noted, the IIIb and IIICS were fitted with the Ultron as standard.

==== Vito automatic ====
The Vito automatic line used a simplified exposure setting system in which the shutter speed was fixed according to the film speed, and the aperture was set automatically based on the coupled meter.

The original automatic was released in 1960. It was succeeded by the automatic II (1961), automatic R (1962), and automatic I (1963); cosmetically, they resembled the contemporaneous first-generation Vitomatic (I/II and Ia/IIa), but carried lenses branded Lanthar rather than Color-Skopar.

Vito automatic models
Years	Model	Light meter	Rangefinder	Lens	Image	Notes
1960	—	Yes	No	Lanthar 50 mm f/2.8		Simple green/red exposure signal in viewfinder
1961	II	Yes	No	Lanthar 50 mm f/2.8		Selenium meter surrounding lens; match-needle metering window on top deck
1962	R	Yes	Yes	Lanthar 50 mm f/2.8		Adds coupled rangefinder to original automatic
1963	I	Yes	No	Color-Lanthar 50 mm f/2.8		Reissue of original automatic

=== Vitoret ===
The Vitoret line includes manual-exposure viewfinder and rangefinder cameras with a limited range of selectable shutter speeds (in some cases, 1/125, 1/60, or 1/30 sec + B; later models added a 1/300 s setting) and scale focusing marks. Multiple variants of the Vitoret cameras were made with and without light meters and/or rangefinders. Most are equipped with Lanthar or Color-Lanthar 50 mm f/2.8 lenses; the Vitoret (no suffix) cameras have Vaskar lenses with the same focal length and maximum aperture. Later production cameras (starting from approximately 1966) have squared-off right and left sides, while earlier cameras have rounded sides.

Vitoret models
Years	Model	Light meter	Rangefinder	Image	Notes
1962	—	No	No		Early Vitorets had rounded ends, later Vitorets had squared-off ends starting from approximately 1966/67
1962	D	Yes, uncoupled selenium	No		Available in "Rapid" variant, which uses a film cartridge take-up spool and omits the rewind crank
1963	F	No	No		Includes flashbulb socket under accessory shoe
1963	R	No	Yes		Early production models have a square rangefinder window; later versions have a diamond-shaped window
1964	L	Yes, coupled selenium	No		
1965	DR	Yes, uncoupled selenium	Yes		
1967	LR	Yes, coupled selenium	Yes		
1970	S	No	No		Faster shutter, export model

==== Vitoret 110 ====
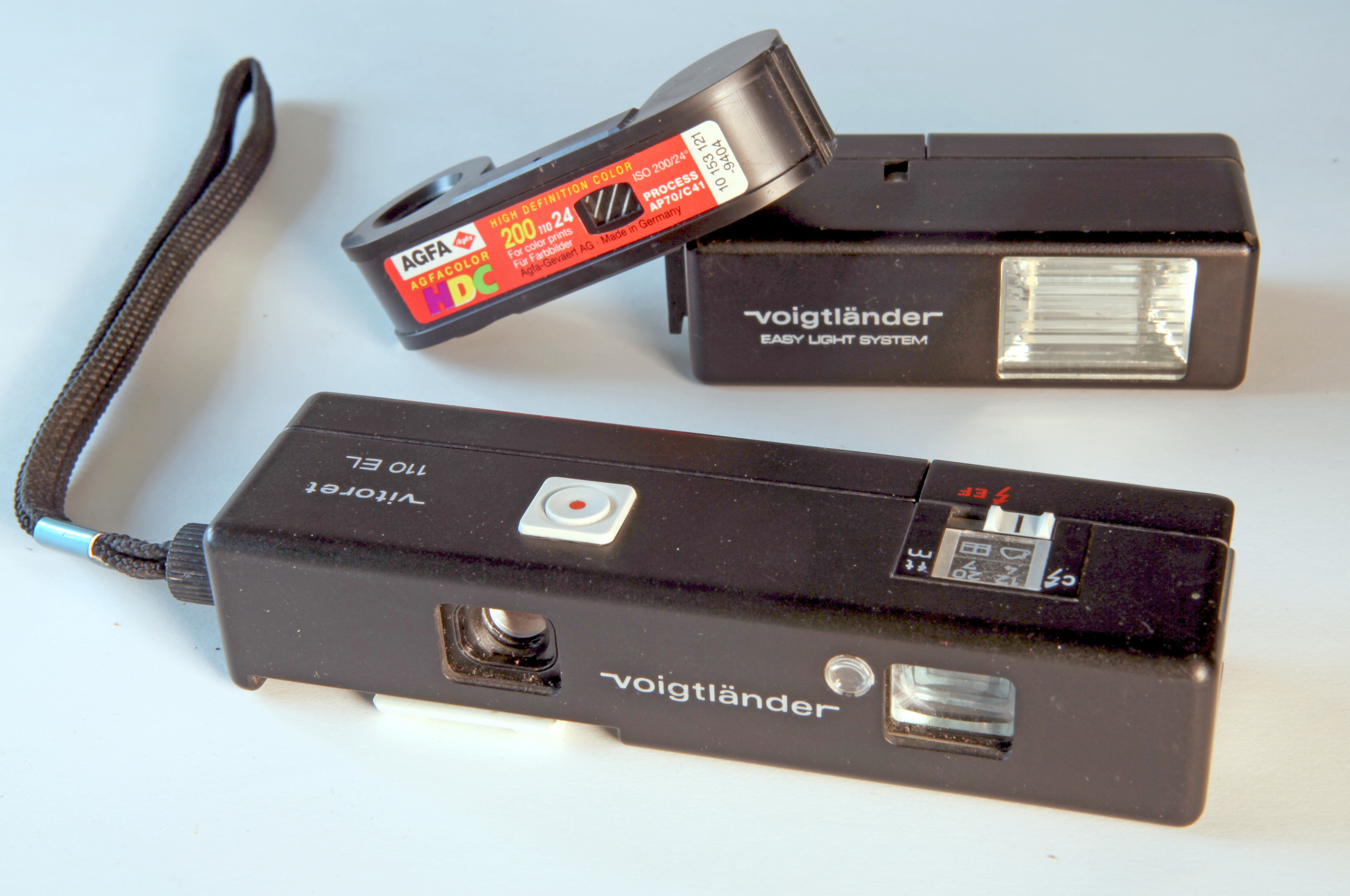
Vitoret 110 EL with matching electronic flash

After Zeiss Ikon ceased camera production in 1971, the Voigtländer brand was acquired by Rollei, who produced a line of 110 film cameras as the Vitoret 110 and Vitoret 110 EL in Singapore. The camera was available with (EL) and without a matching Easy Light System electronic flash unit.

=== Autofocus ===
The Vito, Vitessa, and Vitomatic names were revived in the 1990s for a line of automatic focus point-and-shoot cameras, many with zoom lenses. These were manufactured by Samsung, which had acquired the Rollei brand, and identical cameras were sold under the Rollei and Samsung brands. Cameras include:

Samsung	Rollei	Voigtländer	Lens
AF Slim	Prego AF	Vito C-AF	Voigtar 35 mm f/3.5
—	Giro 70 WA	Vito 70	Zoomar 28~70 mm
Maxima Zoom 70GL / 70XL	Giro 70	Vitessa 70	Zoomar 38~70 mm
Maxima Zoom Evoca 115	Prego 115	Vitomatic 115	Zoom-Lanthar 38~115 mm
IBEX / Maxima 1450, Slim Zoom 145	Prego 145	Vito 145	Super Zoomar 38~145 mm

== Lenses ==
The fast Ultron double Gauss lens was available for selected models, while two versions of the Tessar-derived Color-Skopar were available for most classic Vito and Vitomatic models. Both lens types were designed by Albrecht Tronnier. The lower-specified lines (Vitoret and Vito automatic) used the Lanthar, Color-Lanthar, or Vaskar lenses, also derived from the Tessar, with similar design and performance as the Skopar lenses.

Modern revivals (after 1972) of classic Voigtländer marques use the same names as classic lenses, but may not be similar in design.
