= Voigtländer =

German optical manufacturer

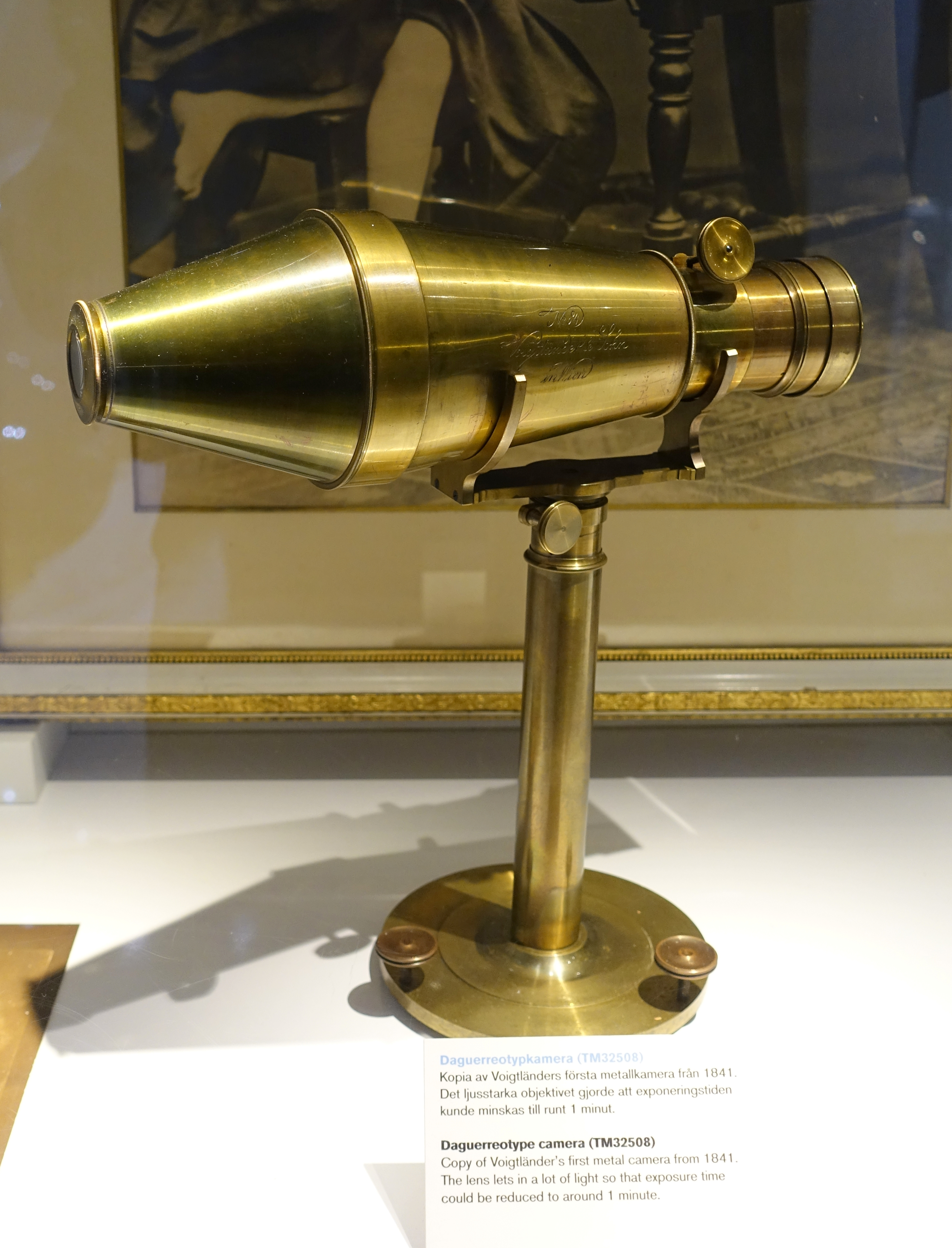
- Replica of the world's first all-metal camera from 1840, the daguerreotype camera No. 84 Voigtländer & Son in Vienna, at the Swedish National Museum of Science and Technology, Stockholm, Sweden. The revolutionary lens is light-fast so that exposure time could be reduced to around one minute.
- Industry: optics and photography (lens and camera manufacturer)
- Founded: 1756; 270 years ago in Vienna, Archduchy of Austria
- Founder: Johann Christoph Voigtländer
- Defunct: 1972
- Fate: Brand acquired by Rollei (1973); Plusfoto GmbH & Co. (1983); RINGFOTO GmbH & Co. ALFO Marketing KG (1997)
- Successor: Schering AG (1923); Carl-Zeiss-Stiftung (1956); Carl Zeiss AG, state of Lower Saxony and Rollei (1972)
- Headquarters: Braunschweig, Germany
- Products: optical lenses, cameras, and other related products

Voigtländer (German pronunciation: [ˈfoːktlɛndɐ]) was a significant long-established company within the optics and photographic industry, headquartered in Braunschweig, Germany, and today continues as a trademark for a range of photographic products.

== History ==
Voigtländer was founded in Vienna, Archduchy of Austria, in 1756, by Johann Christoph Voigtländer. Voigtländer produced mathematical instruments, precision mechanical products, optical instruments, including optical measuring instruments and opera glasses, and is the oldest name in cameras.

=== Early beginnings ===
Johann Christoph Voigtländer (November 19, 1732 in Leipzig – June 27, 1797 in Vienna), the son of a carpenter, came to Prague in 1755, and to Vienna in the same year, and worked from 1757 to 1762 in the workshop of Meinicke, who produced mathematical instruments.

Through Johann Voigtländer's skilful achievements, the Minister of State of the Habsburg monarchy—Prince Wenzel von Kaunitz, drew attention to Voigtländer and Empress Maria Theresa of Austria granted Voigtländer in 1763 a so-called trade "Protection Decree" (German Schutzdekret/Schutzdecret): "on the making of mathematical instruments and on an unspecified number of workers", upon which Voigtländer founded his own workshop and whereby he could sell his products relatively unrivalled.

In 1767, Voigtländer invented two important tools: a linear device for natural and tapered gauges, and a circular device for elevation, astrolabe, and cartography etc., including, a screw cutting machine, a metal lathe and finishing rollers for sheep wool and silk factories. The production program was supplemented by compasses, tweezers, levelling devices, dioptres and other fine mechanical products.

In recognition of his achievements and dexterity, Voigtländer received in 1797 a so-called "national commercial license with all advantages and privileges" (German Landesfabriksbefugnis); this license awarded Voigtländer under certain circumstances the prestige to display the imperial eagle of the Habsburg monarchy, but above all the right to establish branch sales offices in all major cities of the empire. In the same year, Voigtländer died, and his successful family business was continued by his widow, their three sons and one daughter.

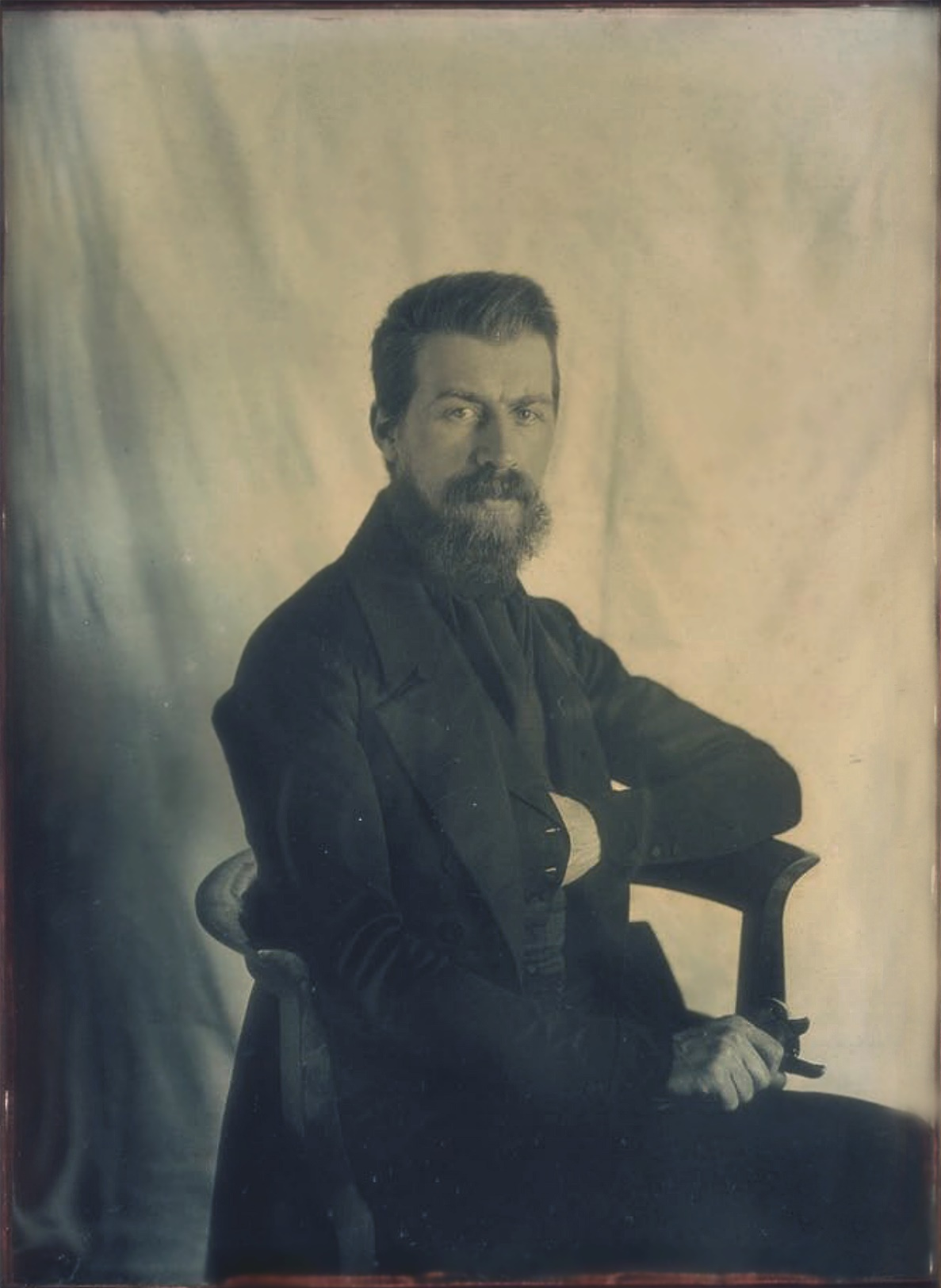
Photo of Johann Christoph Voigtländer's grandson: Peter Wilhelm Friedrich Ritter von Voigtländer (November 17, 1812 in Vienna – April 7, 1878 in Braunschweig). Portrait photo on daguerreotype by Johann Baptist Isenring, ca. 1843

From 1840, Voigtländer's grandson Peter Wilhelm Friedrich Ritter von Voigtländer established Voigtländer as a leading photographic company of its time on introducing and producing the Petzval objective lens.

=== Photography optics and cameras ===
From 1839, the year, when the invention of photography was being published, came objective optics and from 1840 complete cameras for photography. The Voigtländer objectives were revolutionary because they were the first mathematically calculated precision objectives in the history of photography, developed by the Austro-Hungarian/Slovak mathematics professor Josef Maximilian Petzval, with technical advice provided by Peter Voigtländer. Voigtländer went on to produce the first Petzval portrait photographic lens (the fastest lens at that time: f/3.6) in 1840, and the world's first all-metal daguerreotype camera (Ganzmetallkamera) in 1840, also bringing out photographic plate cameras shortly afterwards. An original of the 1840 all-metal daguerreotype camera with "No. 84 Voigtländer & Sohn in Vienna" is exhibited in the "Deutsches Museum" in Munich.

In 1845, Peter Voigtländer married the daughter of a respected Braunschweig lawyer, whom he had met on one of his photographic sale journeys in Braunschweig. Voigtländer had previously set up a branch sales office in Braunschweig, Duchy of Brunswick, at that time the central hub in the German rail network. Compared to Vienna, Braunschweig offered a location advantage regarding the distribution of Voigtländer objectives and daguerreotype camera products due to the greater proximity to the German overseas ports.

During the rising social and political tensions in the Austrian Empire leading to the Revolutions of 1848, Peter Voigtländer had joined the political cause of the Democrats and also became adjutant to the commander of the Vienna national civil guard—General Wenzel Messenhauser. As the revolutions escalated during the Vienna Uprising of October 1848, the counter-revolution had strengthened with full force, and General Messenhauser of the revolting national civil guard, like many others—were executed. Voigtländer at that time had in perception of the power relations withdrawn from the Vienna national civil guard and with his family took refuge in a suburb of Vienna. On the wishes of Peter Voigtländer's wife and when the March revolutions of 1848 hindered the further development of the young photographic company, the family promptly re-located from Vienna to his wife's hometown Braunschweig, where from 1849 Voigtländer established a subsidiary production site, granted on a provisional "Concession for the pursuit of a trade", issued by the city directorate with a term of five years. In September 1852, Peter Voigtländer was successfully awarded a so-called "land-cooperative" (German Markgenossenschaft) and issued the desired unrestricted "Concession for the pursuit of a trade" in the city Braunschweig. In 1864, Peter Voigtländer was honoured by Emperor Franz Joseph I of Austria with the Knight's Cross of the Order of Franz Joseph; becoming known as Peter Wilhelm Friedrich Ritter von Voigtländer. On the death of Voigtländer's Vienna works manager, the Vienna business was closed in 1868.

=== Public corporation ===
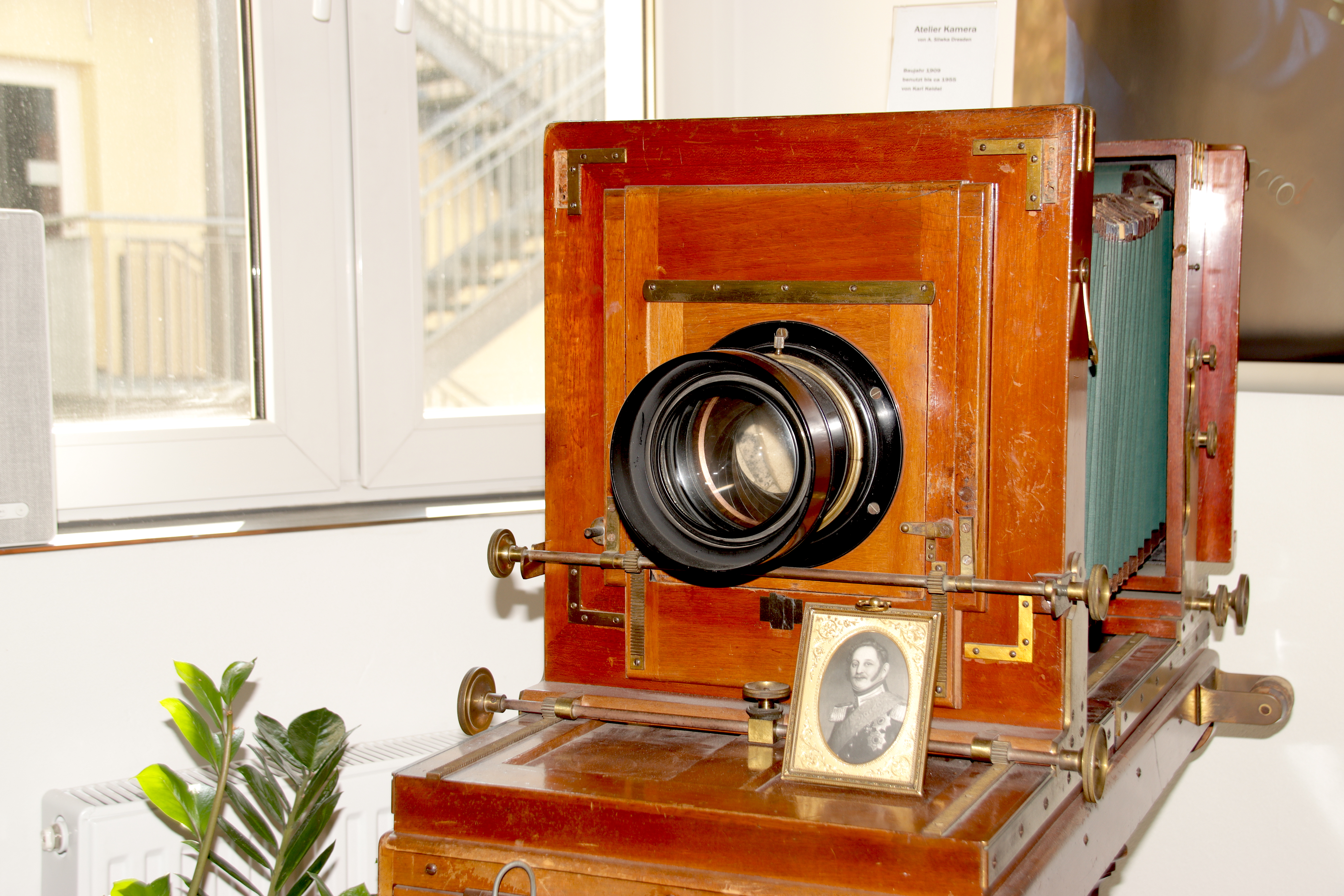
Wooden studio camera c. 1909 with Voigtländer Heliar lens, focal length 42 cm, Serial number 79862

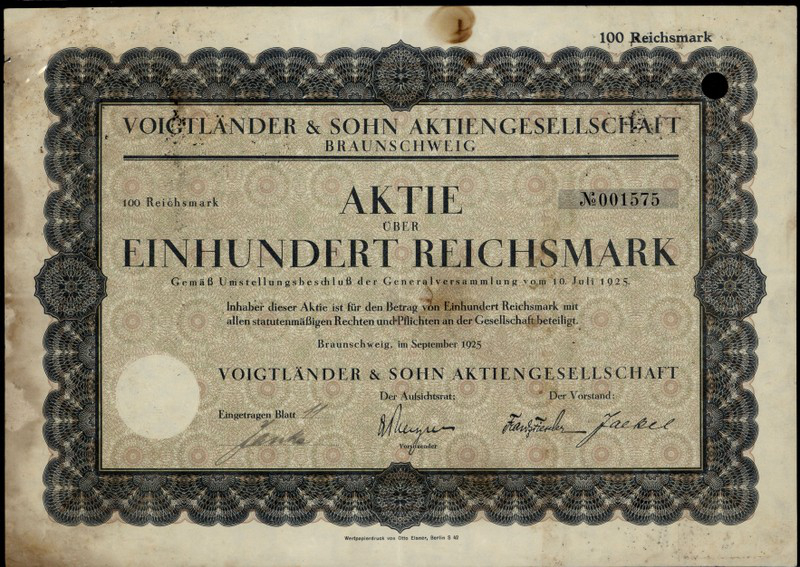
Share of the Voigtländer & Sohn AG, issued September 1925

Voigtländer Braunschweig changed status to a public Aktiengesellschaft (Voigtländer & Sohn AG) in 1898. In 1923 a majority of the shares (99.7%) were acquired by Schering AG's photo division and large-scale production then took place in 1925.

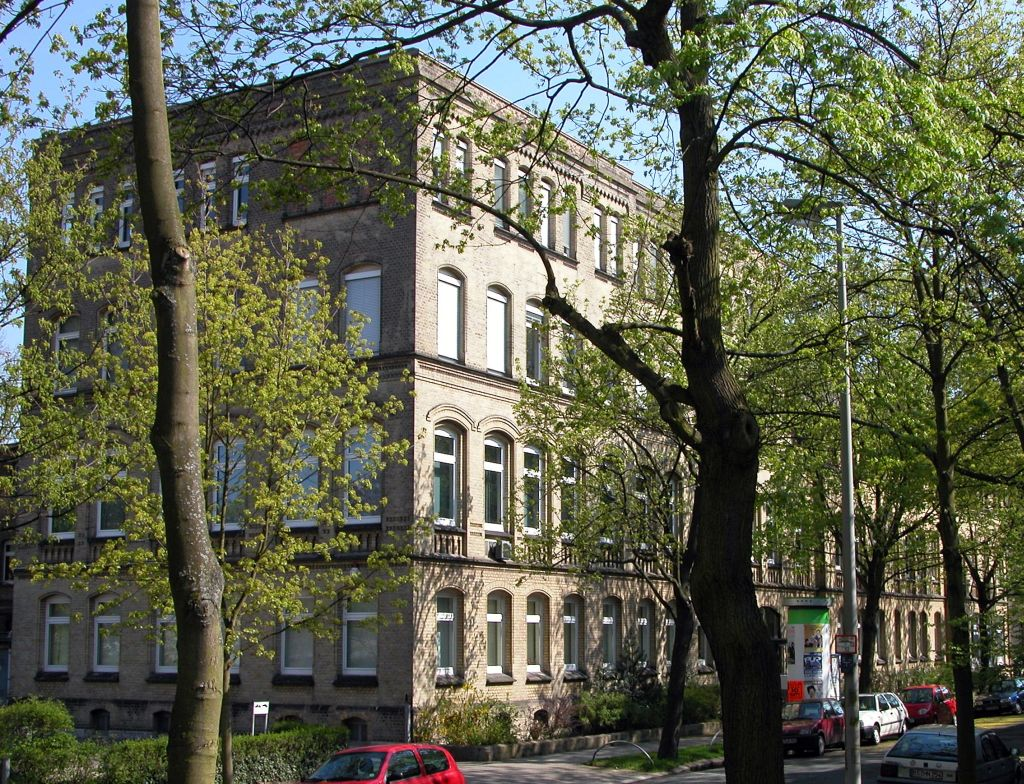
Former headquarters and production site of Voigtländer, at Campe-Straße in Braunschweig, Germany

Over the next three decades, Voigtländer became a technology leader and the first manufacturer to introduce several new photographic products that later became commonplace. These include the first zoom lens for 35 mm still photography (36–82/2.8 Zoomar) in 1959 and the first 35 mm compact camera with built-in electronic flash (Vitrona) in 1965.

Schering sold its share of the company to the Carl Zeiss Foundation in 1956, and Zeiss-Ikon and Voigtländer-Vertriebsgesellschaft integrated in 1965. Due to falling sales, on 4 August 1971 Zeiss-Ikon/Voigtländer-Vertriebsgesellschaft ceased camera production and closed the Voigtländer factory, which employed at the time 2,037 persons. Subsequently, the company was reorganized as the collective enterprise Optische Werke Voigtländer (Optical Works Voigtländer), in which Carl Zeiss AG, the state of Lower Saxony and the Braunschweig camera manufacturer Rollei each took an equal one-third share; in 1974, Rollei took over all the shares. On the collapse of Rollei in 1982, Plusfoto took over the name, selling it in 1997 to Ringfoto.

=== Current Status ===
Since 1999, Voigtländer-branded products have been manufactured and marketed by the Japanese optics and camera company Cosina, under license from Ringfoto GmbH & Co. ALFO Marketing KG; for these, see Cosina Voigtländer.

== Lenses ==
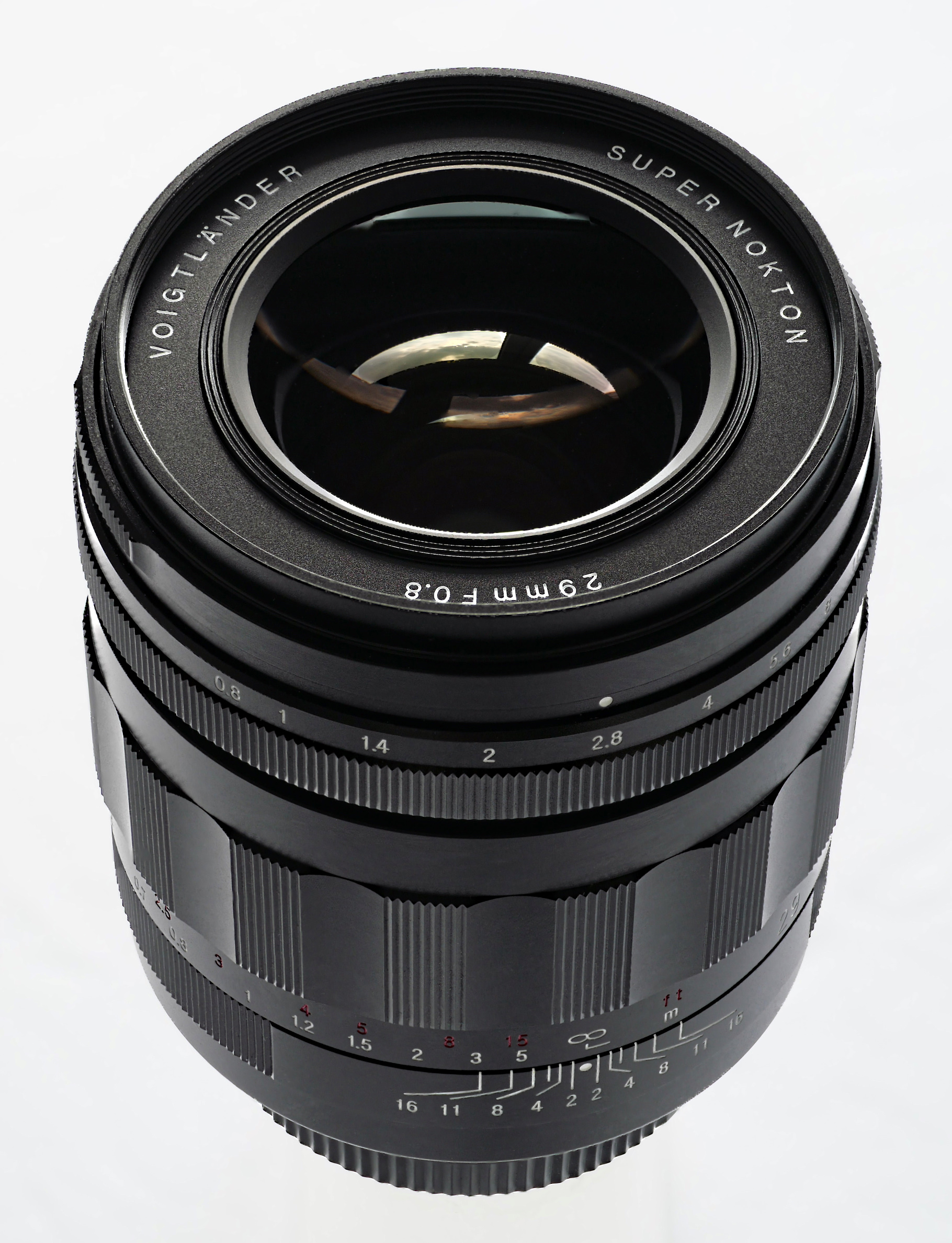
Super Nokton 29 mm f/0.8

Original Voigtländer lens designs can be divided roughly between pre-war designs, which date back to a series of lenses developed by Dr. Hans Harting as Cooke triplet and Tessar derivatives at around the start of the 20th century, and post-war designs, which largely are credited to Dr. Albrecht Tronnier.

The pre-war designs include:

- Heliar, designed by Dr. Hans Harting originally in 1902 as a symmetric design derived from the Cooke triplet with five elements in three groups consisting of two cemented doublets flanking a central bi-concave element, followed quickly by an improved asymmetric design. The Heliar was made over many years, and was usually a 5 element lens, the 75 mm versions were of a 6 element design. The 125 mm version actually had 11 elements.
  - Dynar was a similar five-element, three-group lens designed by Harting in 1904, but the cemented doublets were reversed compared to the original Heliar; this design was later renamed Heliar. Robert Richter designed several improved versions of the Heliar in the 1920s.
  - Tele-Dynar, another five-element, three-group design similar to the Heliar
  - Apo Lanthar, designed by Tronnier in 1949 which shared lens geometries with the improved Heliar that Tronnier developed at the same time. Most are slightly radioactive; the Lanthar name refers to the lanthanum oxide-doped glass used in its construction, which often included thorium dioxide.
- Voigtar, a three-element Cooke Triplet derivative
  - Similar post-war triplet designs include the Vaskar and Color-Lanthar
- Skopar, a 4-element, 3-group Tessar type lens.
  - Improved Skopar designs were sold as Skoparex, Skoparet, Skopagon, Color-Skopar, and Color-Skopar X.
- Heliostigmat, a reversed Tessar
- Radiar, a Dialyte

Tronnier, who previously had designed several lenses for Schneider Kreuznach, joined Voigtländer as a consultant in 1944 and is credited with several important post-war improvements and original designs, including:

- Ultron, a fast asymmetric double Gauss normal lens comparable to the Leitz Summicron and Zeiss Planar designs. This later was reformulated in 1968 with a concave front element for the Icarex cameras, credited as a Carl Zeiss lens after that company had acquired Voigtländer in 1956.
- Nokton, the fastest asymmetric double Gauss lens offered by Voigtländer, comparable to Ludwig Bertele's Ernostar, the Leitz Summilux, and Zeiss Sonnar.
- Ultragon, an asymmetric design coupling the front half of a Topogon with the rear half of a double Gauss design.
- Telomar, a telephoto derived from the Heliar.
- Skoparon, an inverted telephoto wide-angle lens design for SLR cameras incorporating the Skopar.

Additional post-war lenses include:

- Helomar
- Dynarex, Dynaret, Color-Dynarex, Super-Dynarex, Super-Dynaret, telephoto lenses
- Septon, comparable to the Ultron

In addition, Voigtländer offered the Zoomar with its Bessamatic starting from 1959. The Zoomar was designed by Frank G. Back of Zoomar U.S.A and manufactured by Kilfitt in Munich; it is usually reckoned to be the first zoom lens specifically designed for a 35 mm "still" camera.

Voigtländer lens diagrams

Heliar I (1901, Harting)

Heliar II (1902)

Dynar (1904, Harting)

Skopar (1949, Tronnier)

Apo Lanthar (1949, Tronnier)
Heliar III (1949, Tronnier)

Ultron (1950, Tronnier)

Nokton (1950, Tronnier)

Ultragon (1951, Tronnier)

Telomar (1951, Tronnier)

Skoparon (1952, Tronnier)

Zoomar (1959, Back)

Vaskar (1960, Tronnier & Eggert)

Ultron II (1968, Tronnier, Eggert & Uberhagen)

== Models ==
Voigtländer camera lines
Format Type		35 mm	Medium format
SLR		Bessamatic, Ultramatic	—
TLR		—	Brillant, Superb
RF	Fixed-lens, rigid	Vito (B/C)	—
RF	Fixed-lens, folding	Vito (I/II/III/IIa), Vitessa	Bessa, Perkeo
RF	Interchangeable lens	Vitessa T, Prominent	—
Compact		Bessy, Vitomatic, Vitoret, VF 135	—

Voigtländer cameras

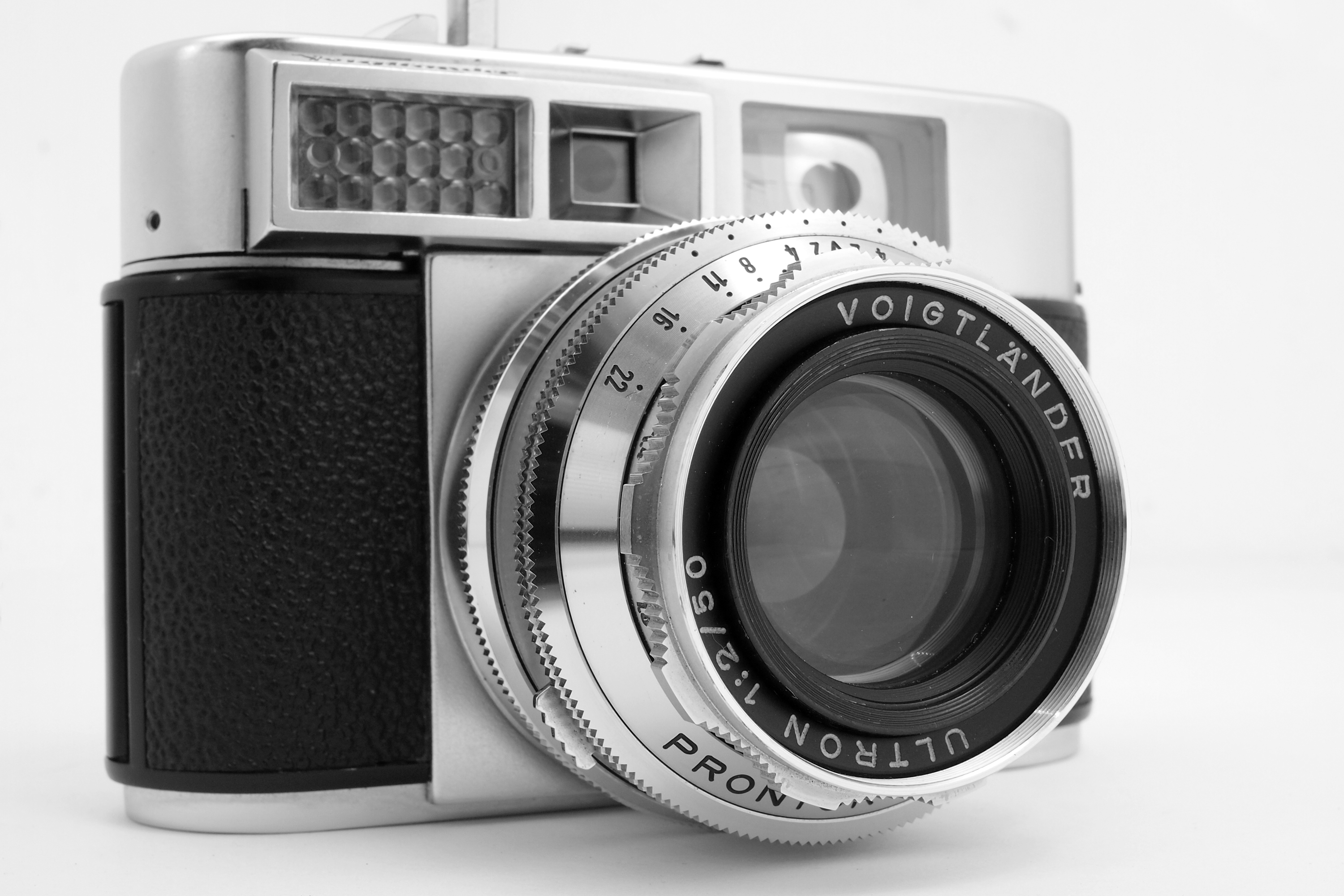
Vitomatic IIa with Ultron 50 mm 1:2

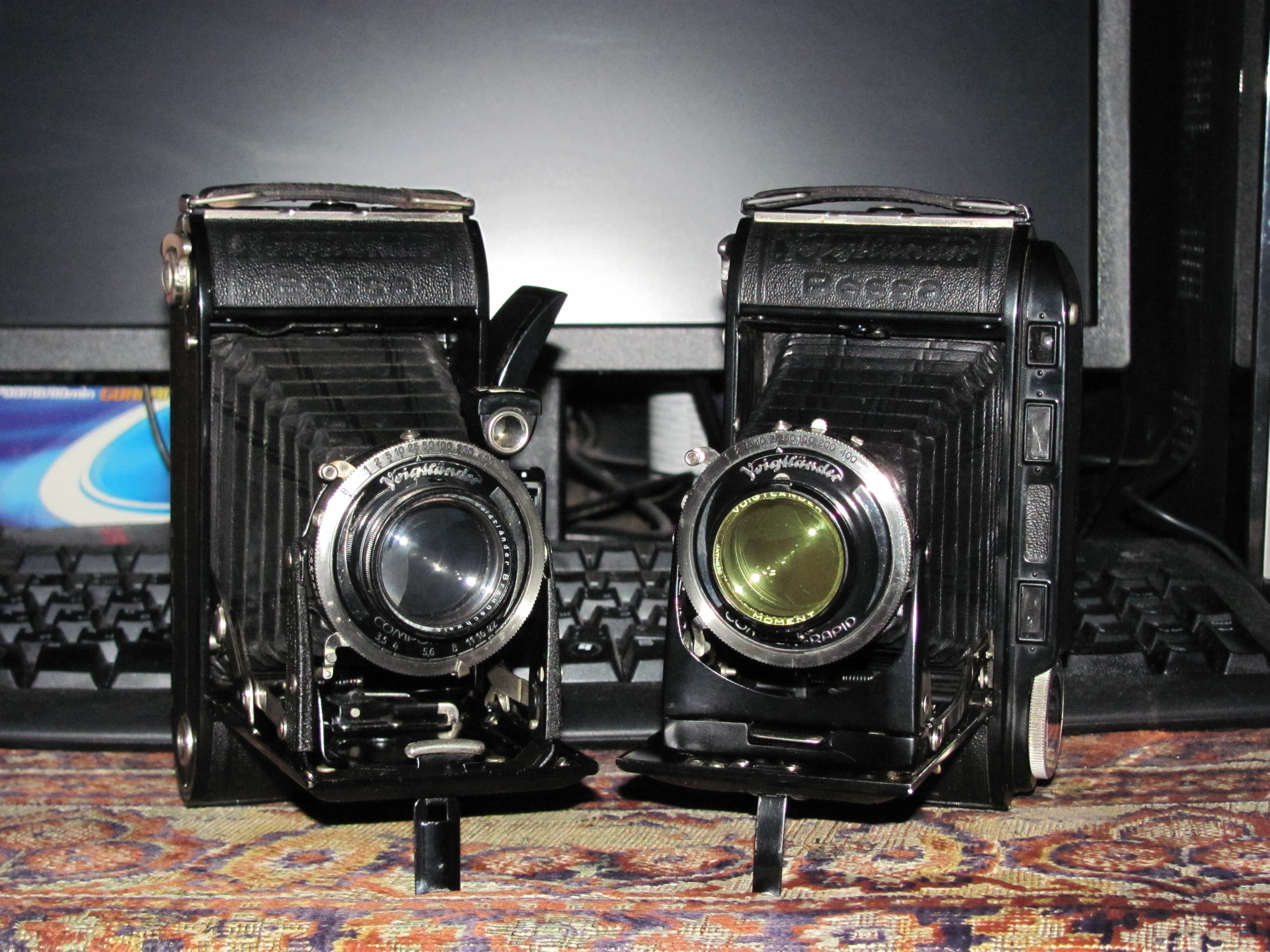
Bessa & Bessa RF

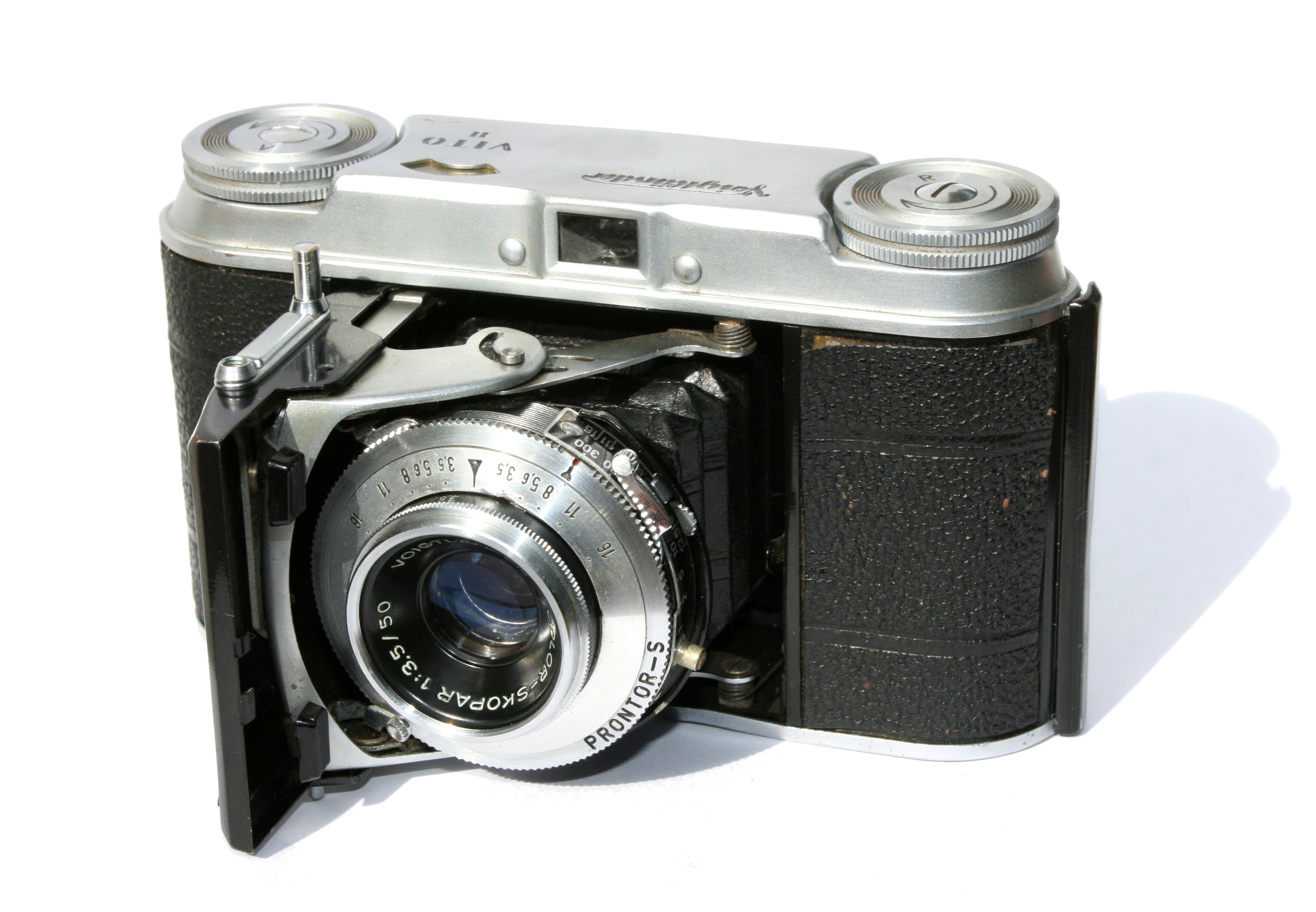
Vito II

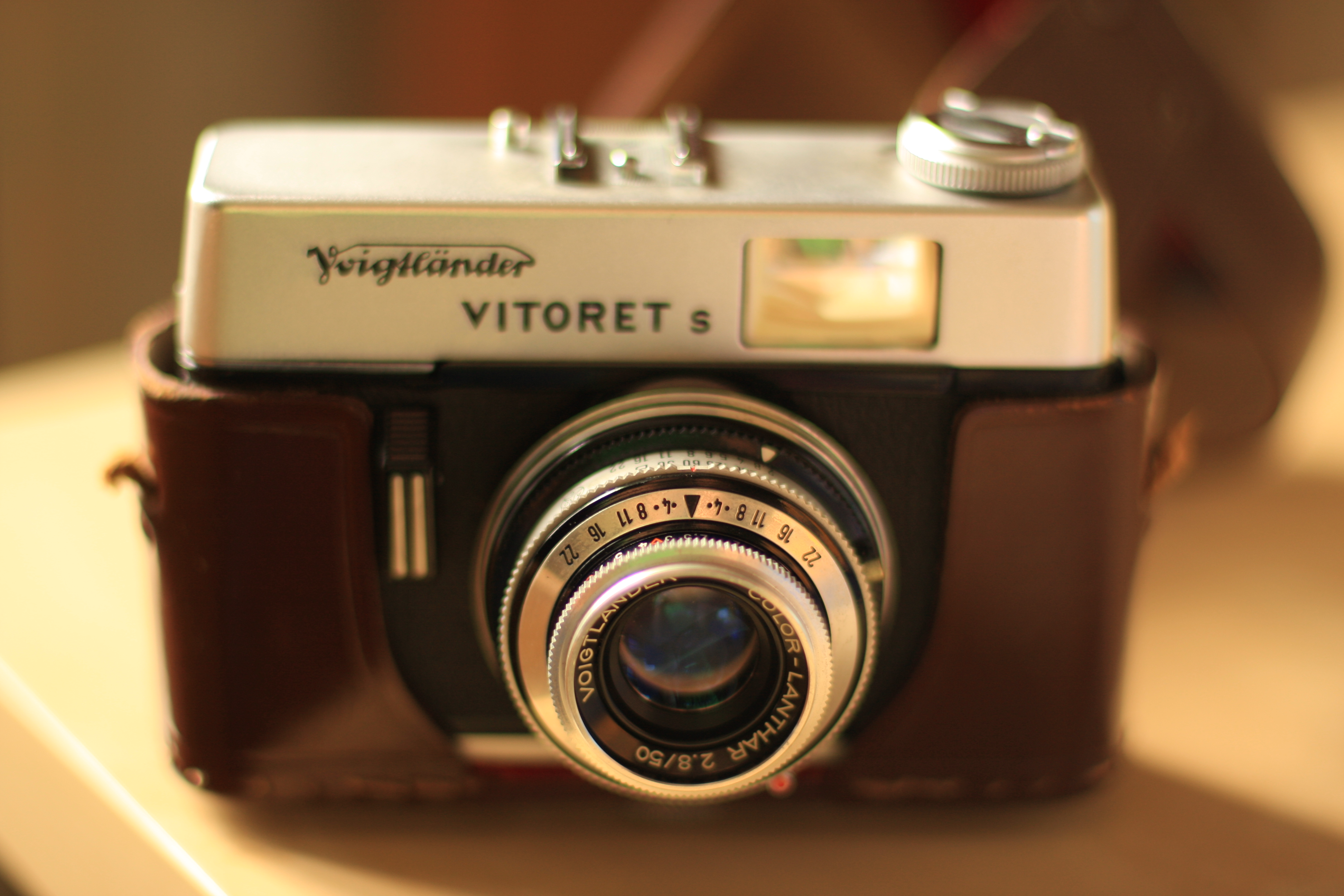
Vitoret S

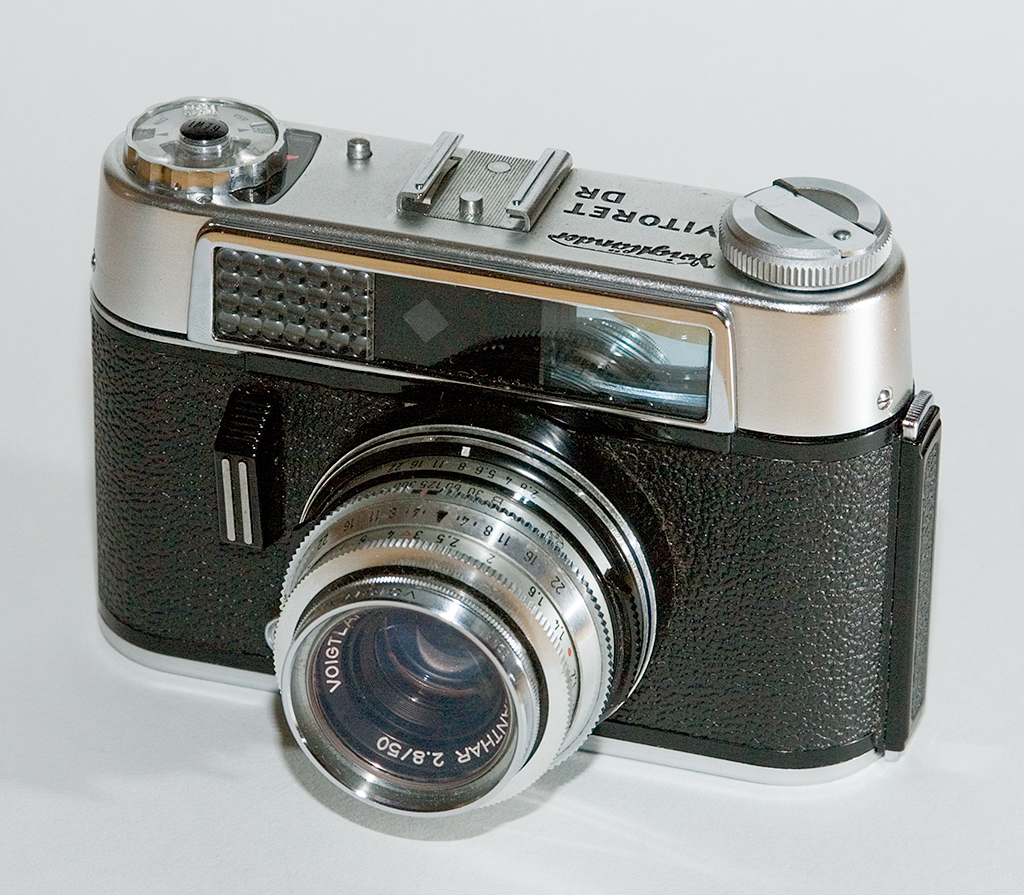
Vitoret DR

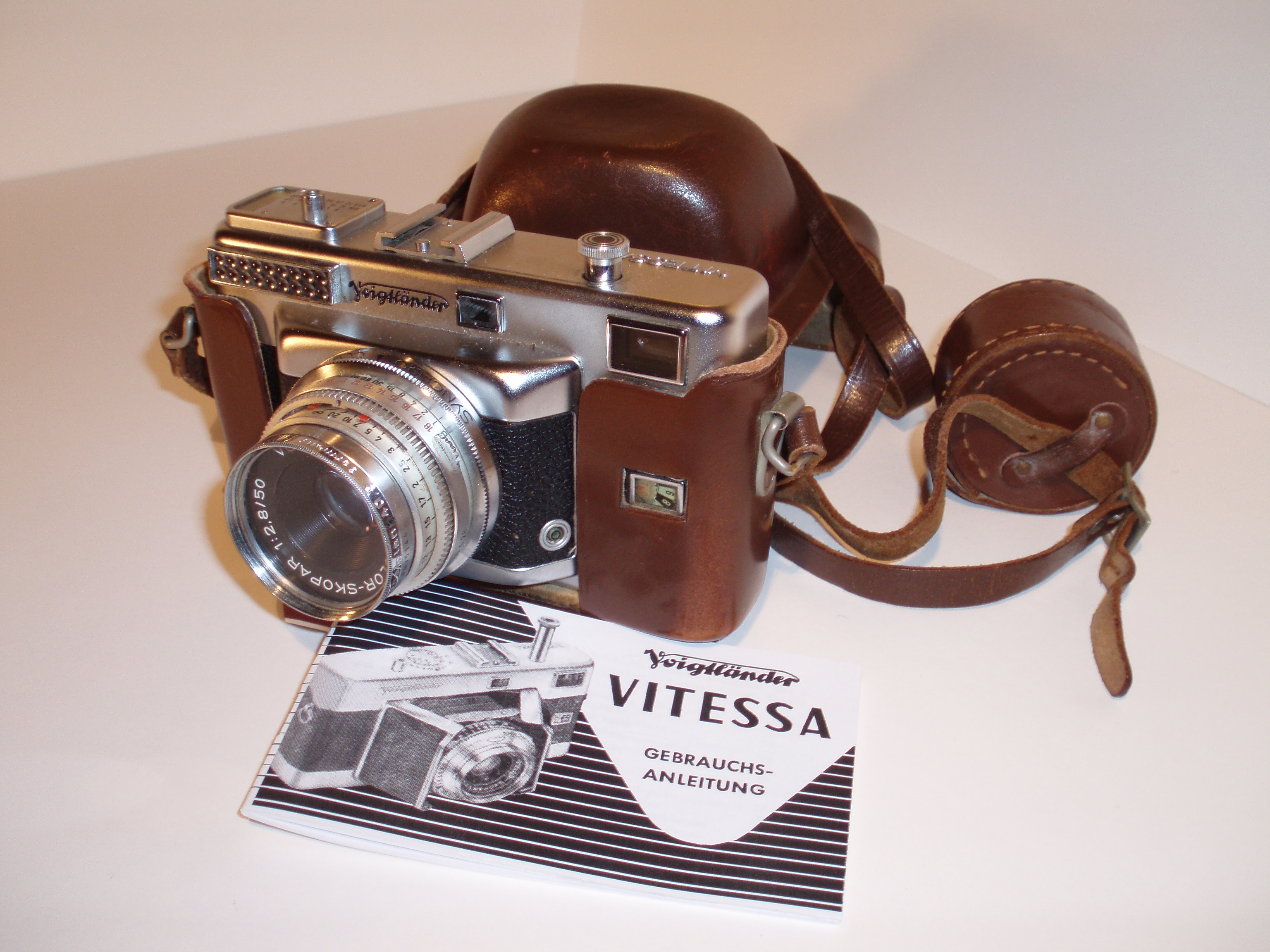
Vitessa T with German manual

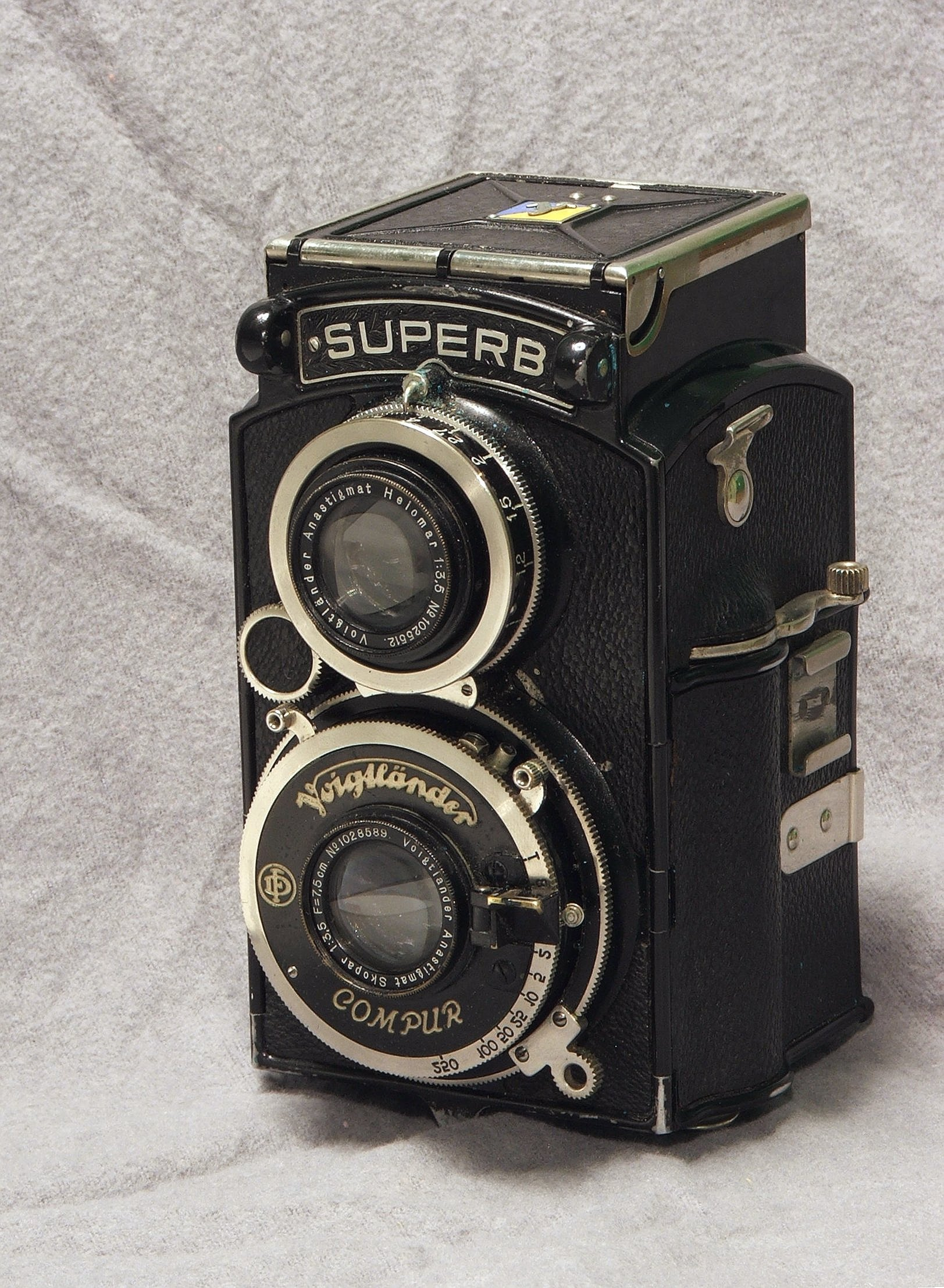
Superb

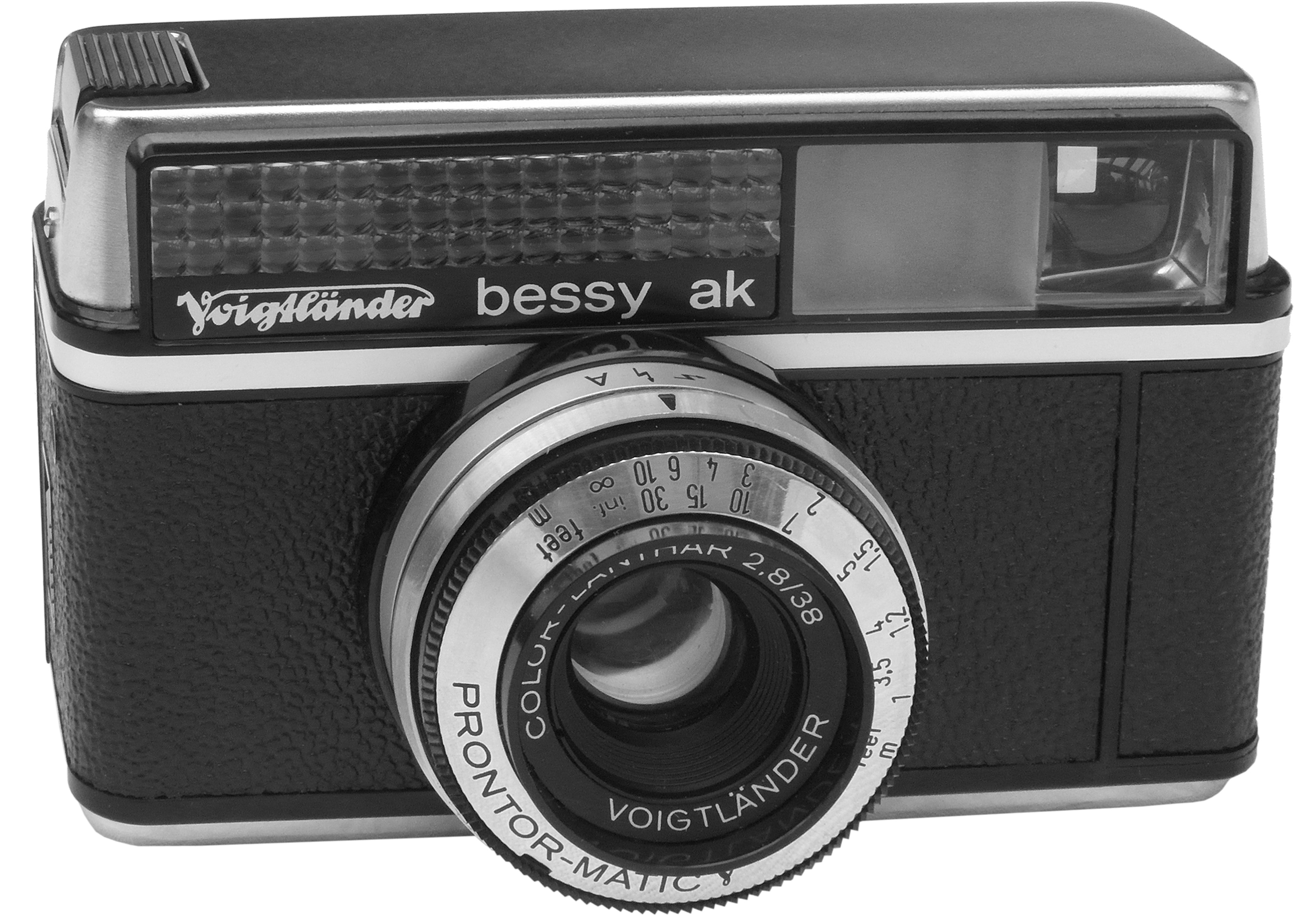
Bessy

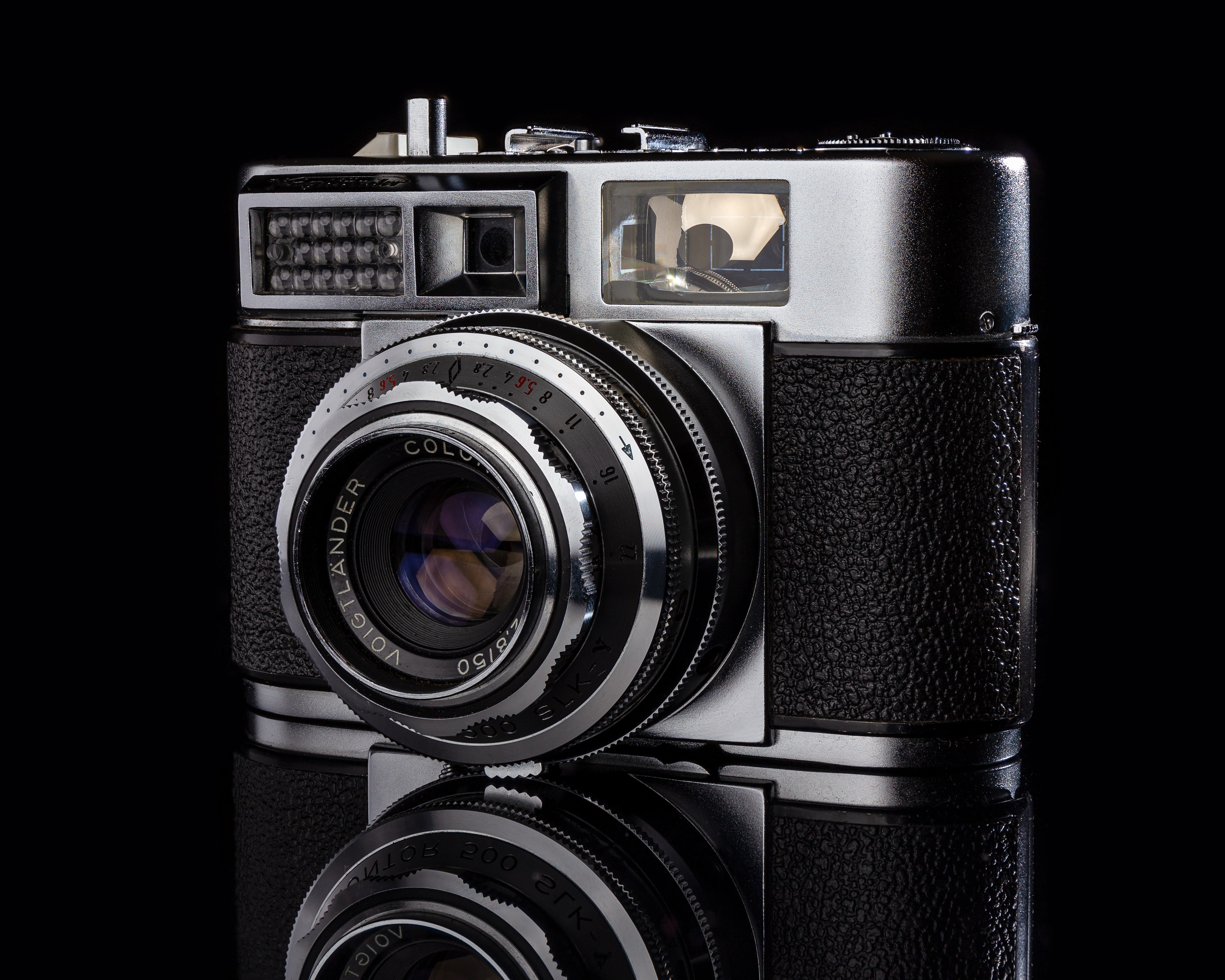
Vitomatic IIa camera with Color Skopar f/2.8 lens

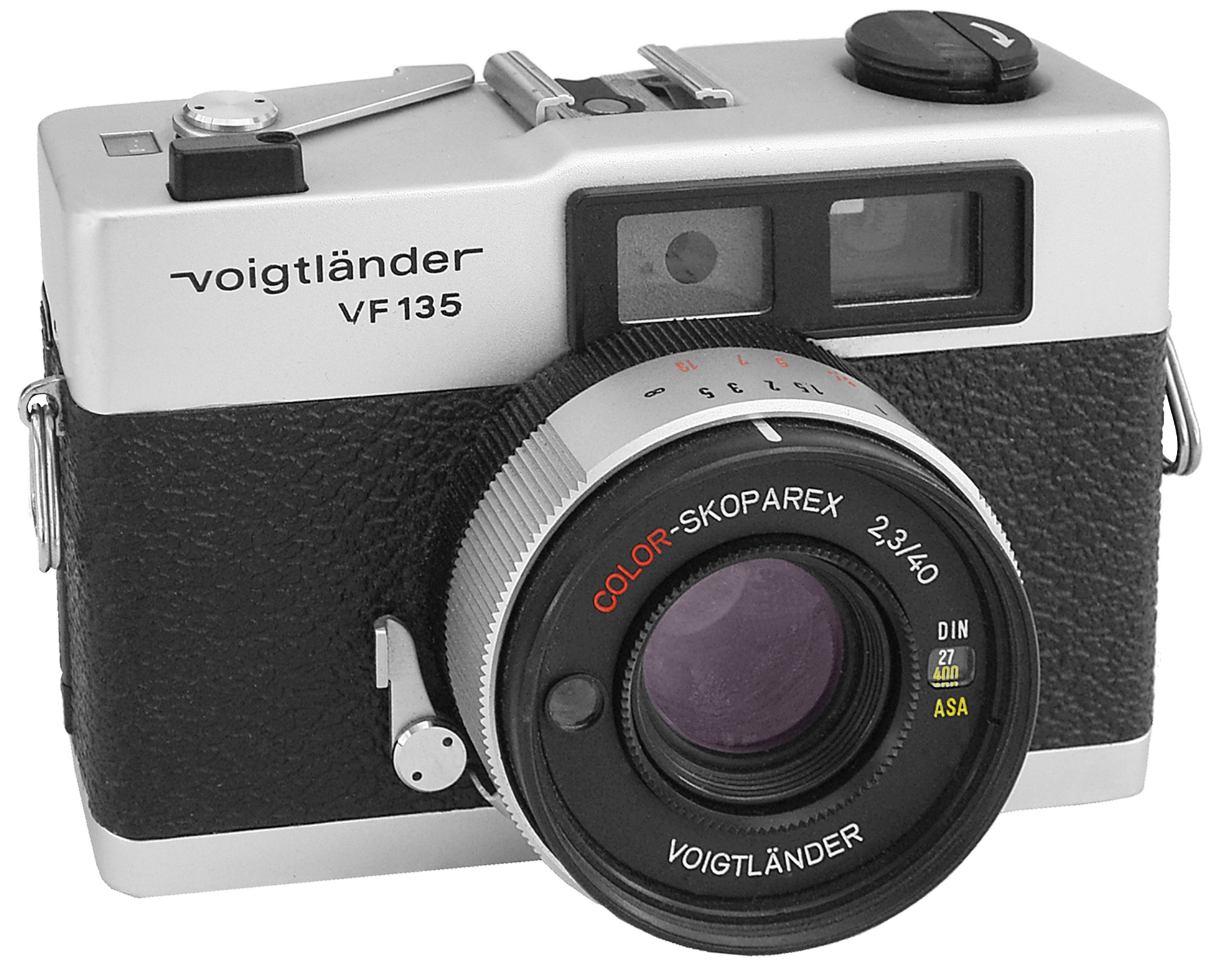
VF 135
- Bessamatic & Ultramatic SLR cameras (1958–69)
- Brillant/Brilliant
- Vitessa rangefinder cameras (1950–59?)
- Vitomatic
