= Dialyte lens =

Airspaced achromatic doublet lens design

A dialyte lens (sometimes called a dialyt) is a compound lens design that corrects optical aberrations where the lens elements are widely air-spaced. The design is used to save on the amount of glass used for specific elements or where elements can not be cemented because they have dissimilar curvatures. The word dialyte means "parted", "loose" or "separated" in Greek.

== Design ==
In its simplest form, a dialyte can be formed by separating the elements in a cemented achromatic doublet of positive and negative lenses, although the powers of the individual elements must be increased to compensate.

== Applications ==
=== Telescopes ===
The idea of widely separating the color correcting elements of a lens dates back to W. F. Hamilton's 1814 catadioptric Hamiltonian telescope and Alexander Rogers' 1828 proposals for a dialytic refractor. The goal was to combine a large crown glass objective with a much smaller flint glass downstream to make an achromatic lens since flint glass at that time was very expensive. Dialyte designs were also used in the Schupmann medial telescope designed by in German optician Ludwig Schupmann near the end of the 19th century, in John Wall's 1999 "Zerochromat" retrofocally corrected dialytic refractor and the Russian made "TAL Apolar125" telescope which uses 6 elements arranged in three widely separated groups.

=== Photography ===
Symmetric dialytes

Dagor Type B (later Celor/Syntor)

Taylor, Taylor & Hobson Aviar (Warmisham, 1917)

There are many types of dialyte camera lenses. One popular design is perfectly symmetric, which provides good correction for many aberrations. This consists of two air-spaced achromatic doublets arranged back-to-back around a central stop, or four air spaced lens elements in total: the outer pair is biconvex and the inner pair is biconcave; one example is the Celor. The Swiss mathematician Emil von Höegh, who had designed the popular Dagor anastigmat lens for Goerz in 1892, continued to refine that design, resulting in the Goerz Dagor Type B lens of 1899, later renamed to Celor and Syntor.

The Aviar lens (Taylor Hobson) designed by Arthur Warmisham (1917) is similar but is considered to have a different origin, from the splitting of the central biconcave element of the Cooke triplet. The resulting two biconcave elements are closer together than in the Dialyte/Celor design.

=== Enlarging ===
Since the aberrations remain constant over a wide range of object distances, and is favourable for fairly wide apertures, this design proved useful for enlarging lenses.

== See also ==
- List of telescope types.
