= 2018 in England =

- Centuries: 19th; 20th; 21st
- Decades: 1990s; 2000s; 2010s; 2020s
- See also: 2017–18 in English football 2018–19 in English football 2018 in the United Kingdom; Other events of 2018

Events from 2018 in England

== Incumbent ==
- Monarch - Elizabeth II
- Prime Minister - Theresa May

== Events ==
=== January ===
- 1 January –
  - Four young men die in unrelated New Year London stabbings.
  - A fire at the Liverpool Echo Arena car park destroys 1,400 cars.
- 3 January – the NHS in England cancels all non-urgent treatments from mid-January until the end of the month, as reports emerge of patients facing long waits for treatment and being stuck on trolleys in corridors, and of ambulances left queuing outside A&E.
- 5 January – Jon Venables, one of the killers of toddler James Bulger in 1993, is charged over indecent images of children.
- 8 January – Princess Charlotte starts attending Willcocks Nursery School, London.
- 8 January – Prime Minister Theresa May announces a Cabinet reshuffle.
- 9 January – The manufacture of cosmetics and personal care products with plastic microbeads is banned in England, with a ban on their sale due to come into force by July 2018.
- 11 January – Theresa May pledges to eradicate all plastic waste throughout England by 2042.
- 12 January – Nottingham railway station damaged by fire, which the local authorities treat as arson.
- 22 January – Buckingham Palace announces that Princess Eugenie of York is to marry her long-term boyfriend Jack Brooksbank at St George's Chapel, Windsor in the autumn.
- 25 January –
  - Industry body Water UK announces that all shops, cafes and businesses in England will provide free water refill points in every major city and town by 2021.
  - The number of rough sleepers in England reaches the highest level since records began – an estimated 4,751.
- 26 January
  - A water main in the London district of Hammersmith bursts, flooding the area's main shopping street, King Street.
  - Three teenage boys on their way to a sixteenth birthday party are killed when a car mounts a pavement in Hayes, West London. Police arrest a 28-year-old man on suspicion of causing death by dangerous driving. A second, 34-year-old man, who fled the scene, later hands himself in to police.
- 30 January
  - Chris Parker, a homeless man who stole from victims of the Manchester Arena bomb attack, is jailed for four years and three months.
- 31 January
  - Shares in government contractor Capita plunge more than 40% after the company issues a profit warning.
  - Another water main bursts in West London, this time in Shepherd's Bush, flooding Goldhawk Road, one of the main streets in the area.

=== February ===
- 2 February – Finsbury Park Mosque attacker Darren Osborne, who drove a van into a group of Muslims, is jailed for life, with a minimum term of 43 years.
- 3 February – British YouTuber KSI defeats fellow British YouTuber Joe Weller in 3 rounds in a YouTube Boxing match at the Copper Box Arena. The event is considered the biggest events in YouTube History as 20 million people are believed to have watched the fight on live streams. KSI then called out American YouTuber Logan Paul and his brother named Comedyshortsgamer fought American YouTuber Jake Paul on 25 August 2018 at the Manchester Arena.
- 6 February – At Maidstone Crown Court, Joshua Stimpson is sentenced to life imprisonment with a minimum term of 26 years for the murder of his ex-girlfriend, Molly McLaren, who was stabbed 75 times in a shopping centre car park in Kent in 2017.
- 7 February
  - Jon Venables, one of the killers of toddler James Bulger, is jailed for possessing child abuse images for a second time.
  - Mayor of London, Sadiq Khan, backs a ruling by the High Court that victims of the serial sex offender John Worboys can challenge in court the parole board's decision to release him from prison.
- 8 February – NHS hospitals in England record their worst ever A&E performance, with only 77.1% of patients treated within four hours in January, far short of the 95% target.
- 9 February – Trinity Mirror purchases Northern & Shell, chaired by Richard Desmond, for £126.7 million.
- 21 February – Jack Whitehall presents the 2018 Brit Awards, which took place in The O2, London, and was broadcast live on ITV.
- 28 February – An earthquake of magnitude 3.2 and depth of 4 km hits Mosser, Cumbria. It was felt in Grasmere, Kendal, Cockermouth and Keswick and was the second earthquake to hit the United Kingdom within two weeks.

=== March ===
- 1 March – Former Mayor of London, Ken Livingstone, is suspended from the Labour Party indefinitely, amid claims of anti-semitism.
- 4 March – Sergei Skripal, a former Russian agent convicted of spying for Britain, is found collapsed on a shopping centre bench in Salisbury, Wiltshire, alongside his 33-year-old daughter, Yulia Skripal. With police suspecting deliberate poisoning, similar to that of Alexander Litvinenko in 2006, a major incident is declared. It is later confirmed by police that a nerve agent was administered in an attempt to murder Skripal.
- 13 March
  - The government's fiscal statement, which is now called the Spring Statement, is published.
  - Russian exile Nikolai Glushkov is found dead at his London home.
- 14 March
  - Stephen Hawking, world-renowned theoretical physicist, author, and cosmologist, dies at his home in Cambridge, aged 76.
  - The government calls for an urgent meeting of the UN Security Council to discuss the poisoning of Sergei Skripal and Yulia Skripal on 4 March. Theresa May announces that 23 Russian diplomats will be expelled from the UK after Russia fails to respond to claims of involvement.
- 15 March – Following the events of 4 March, Theresa May visits Salisbury after the nerve agent attack on Sergei and Yulia Skripal.
- 17–19 March – Heavy snow affects much of the UK. It is dubbed the "mini beast from the east"; a sequel to the previous cold wave at the start of the month. On 17 March, amber weather warnings are issued for north-west England, Yorkshire, the Midlands, London and south-east England. On 18 March, they are issued for south-west England, south-east and mid-Wales and the West Midlands. Dozens of vehicles were stuck overnight on the A30 in Devon whilst two weather warnings are still in place for much of the UK after wintry showers disrupted many parts of Britain.
- 17 March – A 21-year-old man is arrested and charged with attempted murder after driving a Suzuki Vitara into the Blake's nightclub at Gravesend, Kent, injuring thirteen people.
- 18–19 March – Boris Johnson dismisses claims from Russian EU ambassador, Vladimir Chizhov, who said that Porton Down may have been the source of the nerve agent. It is reported that experts from the Organisation for the Prohibition of Chemical Weapons will arrive on 19 March to test samples of the substance.
- 18 March – TV presenter Ant McPartlin is arrested for drink driving after a car crash in Richmond, West London.
- 19 March
  - The Gambling Commission recommends that fixed odds betting terminals should be cut to £30 or less from £100.
  - Micro Focus shares fell 55% to 849p after they warn of a sharp fall in revenue and its chief executive, Chris Hsu resigned.
  - Channel 4 airs a documentary about Cambridge Analytica, the data analysis company that worked on the Leave.EU campaign in favour of Brexit, and for Donald Trump's presidential campaign. Undercover reporters, talking to executives from the firm, discover the use of bribes, honey traps, fake news campaigns and operations with ex-spies to swing election campaigns around the world. An emergency court order is requested to raid the Cambridge Analytica offices.
- 20 March
  - The board of Cambridge Analytica suspends CEO Alexander Nix with immediate effect, pending a full and independent investigation.
- 21 March – Following eight years of austerity, a pay rise is agreed for 1.3 million NHS staff, with minimum increases of at least 6.5% over three years and some employees receiving as much as 29%.
- 23 March
  - Ahmed Hassan, perpetrator of the Parsons Green bombing, is sentenced to life in prison with a minimum term of 34 years.
  - Labour Party leader Jeremy Corbyn sacks Owen Smith from the Shadow Cabinet for calling for a second EU referendum, in contrast with official party policy and was replaced by Tony Lloyd. Smith was an ardent supporter of Britain continuing membership of the EU.
- 28 March – The UK Government announces that consumers in England will soon pay a deposit when they buy drinks bottles and cans in a bid to boost recycling and cut waste, but consumers will get the money back if they return the container.
- 31 March
  - Professor Stephen Hawking's funeral takes place at the Church of St Mary the Great, Cambridge.
  - The UK Government had received a request from the Russian Embassy to visit Yulia Skripal in hospital after the 4 March poisoning.

=== April ===
- 1 April
  - All privately rented properties in England and Wales must have a minimum energy performance rating of "E".
  - The National Living Wage for people over 25 increased from £7.50 to £7.83 an hour. Workers between 21 and 24 received an hourly pay rise from £7.05 to £7.38, wages rose from £5.60 to £5.90 for 18–20 year olds, from £4.05 to £4.20 for 16–17 year olds and from £3.50 to £3.70 for apprentices aged under 19 or in the first year of their apprenticeship.
- 4 April – A 78-year-old man is arrested on suspicion of murder after a suspected burglar, armed with a screwdriver, forced the man into his kitchen where a struggle ensued and the burglar was stabbed to death.
- 5 April – All firms with at least 250 employees must reveal data about their pay differences between men and women.
- 11 April – A £70,000,000 plan to extend Birmingham's Alexander Stadium has been announced for the 2022 Commonwealth Games. Prime Minister Theresa May confirmed this on a visit to the city.
- 13 April – The London Stock Exchange announces that it has appointed David Schwimmer as Chief Executive who will take up the post on 1 August to replace Xavier Rolet who quit the role last November.
- 16 April – TV presenter Ant McPartlin appeared at court charged with drink driving.
- 17 April – Theresa May apologises to Caribbean leaders at Downing Street over the Windrush generation controversy.
- 19 April – Theresa May announces a ban on plastic straws and cotton buds in England.
- 21 April – The Queen's Birthday Party, a music concert celebrating the ninety-second birthday of Queen Elizabeth II, is held at London's Royal Albert Hall.
- 22 April – The London Marathon takes place, amid the hottest temperatures ever seen at the event, reaching 24.1 °C (75.3 °F) in St James's Park.
- Catherine Middleton (the Duchess of Cambridge) gives birth to a baby boy at St Mary's Hospital, London who becomes fifth in line to the throne and Elizabeth II's sixth great-grandchild. He is subsequently named Louis Arthur Charles.
- 24 April – The first statue of a woman in Parliament Square is unveiled, that of suffragist Millicent Fawcett.
- 28 April
  - Alfie Evans, a toddler at the centre of a legal case into whether he should be granted medical treatment to prolong his life, dies in Liverpool aged 23 months.
  - Sainsbury's and Asda are reported to be at an advanced stage of talks to merge the two supermarkets.
  - An outbreak of oak processionary, a species of toxic caterpillar, is reported across Greater London and surrounding areas.
- 29 April – Amber Rudd resigns as Home Secretary following the Windrush scandal. She is replaced the following day by Sajid Javid, the first British Pakistani to hold the post.

=== May ===
- 2 May – Cambridge Analytica files for bankruptcy, following the data privacy scandal.
- 3 May
  - Elections to many local councils and mayoralties are held in England, including all 32 London boroughs. There are losses for the Conservatives (−33) and gains for Labour (+77), the Lib Dems (+75) and Green Party (+8). Meanwhile, UKIP are nearly wiped out, losing 123 councillors and retaining just three. Other parties see a net loss of four councillors.
  - A by-election is held at the West Tyrone constituency following the resignation of MP Barry McElduff in January.
  - Ten people are injured by an explosion at a Jewish festival in London.
- 5 May – The Temperate House at Kew Gardens in London reopens, following a five-year, £41,000,000 revamp.
- 7 May
  - The UK experiences its hottest early May bank holiday (since its introduction in 1978) with a temperature of 28.7 °C (83.66 °F) recorded at RAF Northholt in West London.
  - Mark Williams defeats John Higgins by 18 frames to 16 to win the 2018 World Snooker Championship.
- 9 May – Two fairground workers are found guilty of manslaughter by gross negligence over the death of a 7-year-old girl on a bouncy castle in Essex during March 2016.
- 11 May – Theresa May agrees to appoint a panel to help oversee the Grenfell fire inquiry, following pressure from campaigners.
- 16 May – Stagecoach Group announces that rail services on the East Coast Main Line will be brought back under UK government control.
- 17 May
  - The UK government announces that fixed odds betting terminals will be reduced to £2 under new rules, but bookmakers warns that the cut could lead to thousands of outlets closing.
  - British retailer Mothercare confirms the closure of 50 stores as part of their rescue plan, putting 800 jobs at risk.
- 19 May – The wedding of Prince Harry and Meghan Markle is held at St George's Chapel, Windsor, with an estimated global audience of 1.9 billion.
- 21 May – Former Mayor of London Ken Livingstone resigns from the Labour party, having been suspended since 2016 over allegations of anti-Semitism.
- 22 May
  - A memorial service at Manchester Cathedral is held at 14:30 BST, along with a national minute's silence, to mark the first anniversary of the Manchester Arena attack.
  - British retailer Marks & Spencers confirms the closure 100 stores as part of their reorganisation of the company by 2022.
- 23 May – The Environment Agency warns that England will face water supply shortages unless rapid action is taken by 2050.
- 24 May
  - The Institute of Fiscal Studies and the Health Foundation have said the NHS would need an extra 4% a year (£2,000 per UK household) to fund it by 2033.
  - The chequered skipper butterfly which became extinct since 1976 in England has been reintroduced within Rockingham Forest.
- 30 May – The co-Leader of the Green Party Caroline Lucas announces that she will step down as co-Leader in September.

=== June ===
- 5 June – The UK Government approves a controversial plan for a third runway at Heathrow Airport.
- 6 June – A major fire damages the five-star Mandarin Oriental hotel in Knightsbridge, a week after "the most extensive restoration in its 115-year history" was completed. Plumes of black smoke are visible across London.
- 7 June – Department store chain House of Fraser announces the closure of 31 stores affecting 6,000 jobs, which includes its flagship store in Oxford Street, London. It will remain open until early 2019.
- 8 June
  - BuzzFeed publishes a leaked recording of Boris Johnson at a private dinner of Conservative Party activists, during which he praises U.S. President Donald Trump, warns that Brexit is heading for "meltdown" and says "I don't want anybody to panic during the meltdown. No panic. Pro bono publico, no bloody panic. It's going to be all right in the end."
- 9 June
  - The Queen's Birthday Honours include former Scottish football player and manager Kenny Dalglish, along with actress and screenwriter Emma Thompson. There is controversy as Network Rail boss Mark Carne is honoured with a CBE, following recent problems with Thameslink and Great Northern.
- 14 June
  - The Lewisham East by-election took place. Janet Daby retained the seat for Labour with a 50.2% share of the vote, but a significantly reduced majority due to a swing towards the Liberal Democrats.
  - On the one-year anniversary of the Grenfell Tower disaster, the tower was illuminated green with twelve other buildings across West London and Downing Street at 00:54 BST whilst a virgil took place at a nearby church, where the names of the dead were announced at 01:30 BST and a minute's silence took place at midday.
- 19 June
  - It becomes illegal in England and Scotland to sell rinse-off cosmetics and personal care products that contain microbeads.
  - The government announces a review into the use of cannabis for medicinal purposes.
- 23 June – Around 100,000 anti-Brexit campaigners march through central London demanding a final vote on any UK exit deal. The organisers, People's Vote, say that Brexit is "not a done deal" and people must "make their voices heard", whilst James McGrory from pressure group Open Britain says there should be "a choice between leaving with the deal that the government negotiates, or staying in the European Union".
- 24 June
  - The East Coast Main Line comes back under government control, following the failure of the franchise.
  - England record their biggest ever victory at a World Cup game, winning 6–1 against Panama, with captain Harry Kane scoring a hat-trick to take the team through to the final sixteen.
- 25 June – The UK experiences the hottest weather of the year so far, with temperatures reaching up to 29.4 °C (84.9 °F) in London. The highest temperature is recorded in St James's Park. The same location had experienced the year's previous record temperature of 29.1 °C (84.3 °F) in April.
- 27 June – More than 50 homes are evacuated in Carrbrook and 150 are affected as the Saddleworth Moor fire spreads in Greater Manchester. It is declared a major incident.
- 29 JuneProfessor Philip Alston, a special rapporteur on human rights and extreme poverty, says the UN will investigate the impacts of Tory austerity in Britain, the organisation's first such probe into an advanced European country since 2011.
- 30 June
  - Four young men aged between 18 and 21 are killed when their car collides with a taxi on the A6120 outer ring road, Leeds. Two girls aged 16 and 17, also in the car, are injured, along with the driver of the taxi, a 42-year-old man from Bradford.
  - Thousands of people march through London to mark the 70th anniversary of the NHS and to protest against government cuts to the health service.

=== July ===
- 1 July – In an interview with Sky News, Labour Leader Jeremy Corbyn says: "I think at this stage we should say that medical use of cannabis is good. Cannabis oil use is clearly beneficial to people and that should be decriminalised and made readily available as quickly as possible."
  - Counter terror police investigate after a man and woman are exposed to the Novichok nerve agent near Salisbury, four months after a similar incident in the area.
- 8 July
  - Police launch an international murder investigation after Dawn Sturgess dies in Salisbury Hospital after being exposed to a "high dose" of novichok nerve agent in Wiltshire on 30 June.
  - David Davis resigns as Brexit secretary. Following this, two more DExEU ministers, Suella Braverman and Steve Baker also resign.
  - Dutch electronics firm Philips warns that it may shift production out of Britain in the event of a "hard" Brexit, with CEO Frans van Houten stating: "I am deeply concerned about the competitiveness of our operations in the UK, especially our manufacturing operations."
- 9 July
  - Dominic Raab is appointed as Brexit secretary after David Davis' resignation.
  - Boris Johnson resigns as Foreign Secretary, saying that the "dream is dying, suffocated by needless self-doubt". He is replaced by Jeremy Hunt.
  - Prince Louis, the third child of Prince William and Catherine (then Duke and Duchess of Cambridge), is baptised in a private ceremony at the Chapel Royal at St James's Palace.
- 10 July
  - The Royal Air Force (RAF) marks its 100th anniversary with a flyby of 100 aircraft over London and South East England. The Queen, accompanied by The Prince of Wales, also presents a new Queen's Colour to the Royal Air Force at a ceremony on the forecourt of Buckingham Palace.
  - Two vice chairs of the Conservative Party, Maria Caulfield and Ben Bradley, resign in protest at Theresa May's Chequers Brexit compromise plan.
- 11 July
  - England are defeated by Croatia in the World Cup Semi Final, losing 2–1.
  - The ex-British ambassador to the US, Sir Christopher Meyer, is hospitalised after being brutally beaten at Victoria Station in central London.
- 12 July
  - The government publishes its White Paper, The future relationship between the United Kingdom and the European Union.
  - US President Donald Trump arrives in the UK. The four-day visit includes talks with Theresa May, tea with the Queen, and mass protests featuring a six-metre-tall (20 ft) "Trump baby" blimp flown over Westminster.

=== August ===
- 15 August – Rapper Stormzy announces the launch of the Stormzy Scholarship, a scholarship, which will fund two black British students through their studies at Cambridge University. Two students will be funded from the 2018–19 academic year and two from the 2019–20 academic year.
- 25 August – British YouTuber KSI will face American YouTuber Logan Paul at the Manchester Arena. The fight is expected to be the biggest Event in YouTube History.

=== October ===
- 25 October – A man is arrested after attempting to steal Magna Carta from Salisbury Cathedral by damaging its glass case.
- 27 October – Leicester City's owner Vichai Srivaddhanaprabha was aboard his AgustaWestland AW169 helicopter when it crashed outside the King Power Stadium shortly after taking off from the pitch. Eyewitnesses described seeing the helicopter spinning before crashing and creating a fireball.

=== December ===
- 9 December – The NHS in England announces a ban on the sale of fax machines starting in January 2019, as part of a government plan to phase them out entirely by March 2020.
- 19 December – Labour MP for Peterborough Fiona Onasanya is found guilty of perverting the course of justice for lying about who was driving her car when caught speeding.
- 31 December – Three people including a police officer were stabbed at around 20:50GMT at Manchester Victoria station and a man was held on suspicion of attempted murder.

== Births ==
- 23 April – Prince Louis
- 18 June – Lena Elizabeth Tindall, daughter of Zara Phillips and Mike Tindall

== Deaths ==
=== January ===
- 1 January
  - Miriam Kochan, 88, English writer and translator.
- 2 January
  - Tony Calder, 74, English music promoter and executive (The Beatles, The Rolling Stones).
  - Alan Deakin, 76, English footballer (Aston Villa, Walsall, Tamworth).
- 4 January
  - Peter Birdseye, 98, English footballer (Wycombe Wanderers).
  - Ray Thomas, 76, English singer-songwriter ("Veteran Cosmic Rocker", "For My Lady") and Hall of Fame musician (The Moody Blues), prostate cancer.
- 6 January
  - Nigel Sims, 86, English footballer (Aston Villa, Wolverhampton, Peterborough).
- 8 January
  - Jenny Joseph, 85, English poet.
  - Jackie Perry, 93, English rugby league footballer of the 1940s and 1950s.
- 9 January
  - Ted Phillips, 84, English footballer (Ipswich Town, Leyton Orient, Colchester United), dementia.
- 12 January
  - Bella Emberg, 80, English actress (The Russ Abbot Show).
  - Harry Uzoka, 25, British model, stabbed.
- 13 January
  - Rick Jolly, 71, British Royal Navy surgeon.
- 14 January
  - Cyrille Regis, 59, English footballer, suspected heart attack.
- 16 January
  - Ed Doolan, 76, broadcaster (BBC Radio WM, BRMB; first local presenter to be inducted into the Radio Academy Hall of Fame)
  - Rodney Fern, 69, English football player (Leicester City, Chesterfield), dementia.
- 18 January
  - John Barton, 89, British theatre director, co-founder of the Royal Shakespeare Company.
  - Arthur Davidson, 89, British politician, complications from a fall.
  - Peter Mayle, 78, British author (A Year in Provence).
  - Laurie Morgan, 87, British government official, Chief Minister of Guernsey (2004–2007).
- 20 January
  - Jim Rodford, 76, English bassist (Argent, The Kinks, The Zombies), injuries from a fall.
- 22 January
  - Jimmy Armfield, 82, English football player (Blackpool, national team) and manager (Leeds United), world champion (1966), cancer.
- 23 January
  - Tracey Moore, 76, English cricketer (Norfolk, Minor Counties North, Minor Counties East), cancer. (death announced on this date)
  - Richard Woollacott, 40, British racehorse trainer.
- 24 January
  - Mark E. Smith, 60, British singer and songwriter (The Fall).
- 26 January
  - Stacey Young, 52, model and actress (wife of Paul Young)
- 27 January
  - John Wall, 85, British engineer and inventor (Crayford focuser).
- 29 January
  - Paul Alcock, 64, English football referee, cancer.
  - Sir Cyril Taylor, 82, British educator.

=== February ===
- 2 February
  - Malcolm Jefferson, 71, British racehorse trainer.
- 4 February
  - Alan Baker, 78, British mathematician, recipient of the Fields Medal (1970).
- 5 February
  - Richard Doughty, 57, English cricketer (Gloucestershire).
- 6 February
  - Donald Lynden-Bell, 82, English astrophysicist.
  - Michael White, 58, British author and musician (Thompson Twins).
- 9 February
  - Anne Treisman, 82, British psychologist.
- 10 February
  - Sir Alan Battersby, 92, British organic chemist.
  - Sir Lawrence Byford, 92, British police officer and author, Chief Inspector of Constabulary (1983–1987).
- 13 February
  - Ernest Hecht, 88, Czechoslovak-born British publisher.
- 14 February
  - Al Garner, 88, British jazz musician.
- 19 February
  - Geoff Pimblett, 73, British rugby league player (England national team, St Helens R.F.C.).
  - Stormin MC, 34, British grime musician, skin cancer.
- 20 February
  - Judy Blame, 58, English stylist and art director.
  - Ian Williams, 27, British rugby union player (Doncaster Knights, Rotherham Titans).
- 21 February
  - Emma Chambers, 53, British actress (The Vicar of Dibley).
  - Ian Aitken, 90, British journalist and political commentator.
- 22 February
  - Ivor Smith, 92, British architect (Park Hill). (death announced on this date)
- 23 February
  - Eddy Amoo, 74, British soul singer (The Real Thing).
- 25 February
  - Penny Vincenzi, 78, British writer.
  - Scott Westgarth, 31, British boxer.
- 26 February
  - Sir Paul Jenkins, 63, British lawyer, Treasury Solicitor (2006–2014).
- 27 February
  - Peter Miles, 89, English actor (Z-Cars, Doctor Who). (death announced on this date)
- 28 February
  - Kieron Durkan, 44, English footballer (Wrexham, Stockport County, Macclesfield Town).

=== March ===
- 2 March
  - Gerry Lowe, 90, English rugby player (Warrington Wolves).
- 3 March
  - Roger Bannister, 88, English athlete and neurologist, first man to run a sub four-minute mile.
  - Ian Stewart, Baron Stewartby, 82, British politician and numismatist.
- 4 March
  - Sir William McAlpine, 6th Baronet, 82, British engineering construction executive, manager of Sir Robert McAlpine.
- 5 March
  - Trevor Baylis, 80, British inventor (windup radio).
- 6 March
  - Zena Skinner, 91, British television chef.
  - John Sulston, 75, British biologist and academic.
- 7 March
  - John Molyneux, 87, English footballer.
- 8 March
  - Henry Hope-Frost, 47, British journalist, traffic collision.
  - Antoni Imiela, 63, German-born British convicted rapist.
- 11 March
  - Sir Ken Dodd, 90, English comedian (Diddy Men), singer-songwriter ("Tears") and actor (Hamlet), chest infection.
- 13 March
  - Brenda Dean, 74, British trade unionist and peer.
  - Claudia Fontaine, 57, English backing vocalist. (death announced on this date)
  - Ken Mulhearn, 72, English footballer (Shrewsbury Town, Stockport County, Manchester City).
- 14 March
  - Jim Bowen, 80, English stand-up comedian and TV personality (Bullseye)
  - Stephen Hawking, 76, English theoretical physicist, professor (University of Cambridge) and writer (A Brief History of Time), ALS.
- 15 March
  - Ellis Daw, 89, British zoo executive, founder of Dartmoor Zoological Park.
- 16 March
  - Raymond Wilson, 89, British physicist.
- 18 March
  - Ivor Richard, Baron Richard, 85, British politician and diplomat, Lord Privy Seal (1997–98), ambassador to UN, MP for Barons Court (1964–1974).
- 20 March
  - Scott Ambler, 57, British dancer and choreographer. (death announced on this date)
  - Katie Boyle, 91, Italian-born British actress, television personality, and game-show panellist.
- 21 March
  - John Bacon, 83, British news reader (ITV Anglia, BBC).
- 24 March
  - Bill Lucas, 101, British RAF officer and Olympic long-distance runner (1948).
- 25 March
  - David Cobham, 87, British film director (Tarka the Otter), stroke.
- 28 March
  - Bobby Ferguson, 80, English football player (Derby County) and manager (Ipswich).
  - Mike Tucker, 73, British equestrian rider and commentator.
- 30 March
  - Bill Maynard, 89, English actor (Heartbeart, Confessions of a Window Cleaner, Adolf Hitler: My Part in his Downfall), complications of a fall.
  - Josie Farrington, Baroness Farrington of Ribbleton, 77, British politician, life peer (since 1994).
- 31 March
  - Chris Edwards, 41, British boxer, heart attack.

=== April ===
- 4 April – Ray Wilkins, English footballer and coach.
- 5 April – Eric Bristow, 60, English Hall of Fame darts player, world champion (1980, 1981, 1984, 1985, 1986), heart attack.
- 8 April
  - John Miles (racing driver), 74, British racing driver.
- 10 April
  - Len Tingle, 63, BBC Yorkshire political editor, Cancer.
- 11 April
  - Gillian Ayres, 88, British abstract artist.
  - Robert Matthews, 56, British Paralympic athlete.
- 12 April
  - Alex Beckett, 35, English actor (Twenty Twelve, W1A, Youth).
  - Dame Daphne Sheldrick, 83, British-Kenyan elephant conservationist, breast cancer.
- 13 April
  - Ron Cooper, 79, English professional footballer (Peterborough United).
- 14 April
  - Neil Shand, 84, British comedy writer (Q..., The Russ Abbot Show) and journalist (Daily Mail).
- 15 April
  - Stan Reynolds, 92, British jazz musician.
- 18 April
  - Dale Winton, 62, English radio DJ and television presenter (Dale's Supermarket Sweep, Hole in the Wall, The National Lottery: In It to Win It).
- 19 April
  - Stuart Colman, 73, English musician, record producer and broadcaster, cancer.
- 20 April
  - Roy Bentley, 93, British football player (Chelsea, Fulham, national team).
- 22 April
  - Roy Haggerty, 58, English rugby league player (St Helens, Barrow).
- 23 April
  - Matt Campbell, 29, British television chef (MasterChef: The Professionals).
  - Barrie Williams, 79, British football coach and manager (Sutton United).
- 24 April
  - Rick Dickinson, 69, British industrial designer, cancer.
  - Emma Smith, 94, English author (Maidens' Trip).
- 25 April
  - Dick Bate, 71, British football manager (Southend United).
  - Edith MacArthur, 92, Scottish actress (Take the High Road). (death announced on this date)
- 27 April
  - Roy Young, 81, British singer and pianist.
- 28 April
  - Alfie Evans, 1, British child, subject of parental rights case, neurodegeneration.

=== May ===
- 1 May
  - Peter Temple-Morris, 80, British politician and life peer, MP for Leominster (1974–2001).
- 2 May
  - Cliff Watson, 78, English rugby league footballer (St Helens, Cronulla-Sutherland, national team), cancer.
- 4 May
  - Steve Coy, 56, British musician (Dead or Alive).
  - Patricia Lascelles, Countess of Harewood, 91, Australian-British violinist and fashion model.
- 5 May
  - Robbie Little, 73, British film producer (The Prophecy II, Tsotsi, An American Haunting).
- 8 May
  - Anne V. Coates, 92, British film editor (Lawrence of Arabia, The Elephant Man, Fifty Shades of Grey), Oscar winner (1963).
- 10 May
  - David Goodall, 104, English-born botanist and ecologist
  - Ken Hodgkisson, 85, English footballer (Walsall, West Bromwich Albion).
  - Graham Lovett, 70, English footballer (West Bromwich Albion).
- 12 May
  - Will Alsop, 70, British architect, Stirling Prize winner (2000).
  - Dame Tessa Jowell, 70, English politician, brain cancer.
  - Dennis Nilsen, 72, Scottish serial killer.
- 13 May
  - Beth Chatto, 94, British gardener and writer.
- 14 May
  - Peter Byrne, 90, English actor (Dixon of Dock Green) and director.
- 15 May
  - Jlloyd Samuel, 37, Trinidadian footballer (Aston Villa, Bolton Wanderers), traffic collision.
  - Ray Wilson, 83, English footballer (Huddersfield Town, Everton, national team), world champion (1966).
- 17 May
  - Bill Longmore, 79, British civil servant, West Mercia Police and Crime Commissioner (2012–2016), cancer.
- 20 May
  - Colin Morris, 89, British Methodist minister.
- 21 May
  - Thomas McGhee, 89, English footballer (Portsmouth, Reading). (death announced on this date)
- 22 May
  - Michael Banton, 91, British social scientist.
- 23 May
    - Sir Miles Hunt-Davis, 79, British army officer and courtier, Private Secretary to the Duke of Edinburgh (1993–2010).
- 24 May
  - Cliff Jackson, 76, English footballer (Crystal Palace). (death announced on this date)
- 25 May
  - Dean Francis, 44, British boxer, cancer.
- 30 May
  - Barry Dodd, 70, English businessman, Lord Lieutenant of North Yorkshire (since 2014), helicopter accident.

=== June ===
- 2 June
  - Malcolm Morley, 86, English painter.
- 3 June
  - Doug Altman, 69, British statistician, bowel cancer.
- 4 June
  - Harold Poynton, 82, English rugby league footballer (national team, Yorkshire, Wakefield Trinity).

- 5 June
  - Denman, 18, British racehorse, Cheltenham Gold Cup winner (2008).
- 6 June
  - Harry Walker, 103, English rugby union player. (death announced on this date)
- 7 June
  - Peter Stringfellow, 77, English businessman and nightclub owner, cancer.
  - Geoff Gunney, 84, English rugby league footballer who played in the 1950s, 1960s and 1970s, and coached in the 1970s.
- 8 June
  - Eunice Gayson, 90, British actress.
  - Danny Kirwan, 68, British musician (Fleetwood Mac).
  - Pat Lally, 92, Scottish politician, Lord Provost of Glasgow (1996–1999).
  - Thomas Stuttaford, 87, British doctor and politician, MP (1970–1974).
- 10 June
  - Stan Anderson, 85, English football player (Sunderland, Newcastle United, Middlesbrough) and manager.
- 12 June
  - Jon Hiseman, 73, English drummer (Colosseum, Colosseum II), brain cancer.
- 15 June
  - Leslie Grantham, 71, English actor (EastEnders, Fort Boyard, The Paradise Club).

== See also ==
- 2018 in Northern Ireland
- 2018 in Scotland
- 2018 in Wales
