= Crayford (disambiguation) =

Crayford is a town in the London Borough of Bexley.

Crayford may also refer to:

- Crayford focuser, a popular focusing mechanism in amateur astronomical telescopes
- Crayford Engineering, an English automobile coachbuilder
