= Celor lens =

Celor
- Introduced in: 1898
- Author: Emil von Hoegh
- Construction: 4 elements in 4 groups
- Aperture: f/4.5 and 6.3

A Celor lens (also known as a symmetric dialyte) is a highly corrected lens of the Dialyt type, designed for process photography, involving reproduction at or near 1:1 scale.

== Design ==
It was developed in 1898 by Emil von Hoegh, as a development of his earlier Dagor lens (1892) designed for the German company Goerz. It was originally named the Double Anastigmat Goerz [Dagor] Type B, sold in both f/4.5 and f/6.3 versions; in 1904, the faster f/4.5 version was renamed to the Celor and the f/6.3 version was renamed to the Syntor.

Similar four-element air-spaced symmetric dialyte lenses were released by Steinheil (Unofocal, 1901), Kodak, and Taylor, Taylor & Hobson (Aviar, 1917).
