= Anastigmat =

Lens design

Examples of anastigmat lens designs:
1. Symmetric design by Emil von Höegh (1892) with six elements in two groups; marketed as the Double Anastigmat Goerz, a.k.a. Dagor, by Goerz.
2. Asymmetric Zeiss Biotar double Gauss lens design by Willy Merté (1927), with six elements in four groups.
The controllable aperture stop is typically placed in the middle of the composite lens (between the so-called eye- and field-lenses), and its maximum diameter (the one shown) dictates the minimum F-number for each lens.

An anastigmat or anastigmatic lens is a photographic lens completely corrected for the three main optical aberrations: spherical aberration, coma, and astigmatism. Early lenses often included the German word Anastigmat in their name to advertise this new feature (Doppel-Anastigmat, Voigtländer Anastigmat Skopar, etc.).

== History ==
=== Early designs ===
Zeiss Protar (Rudolph, 1890)

The first anastigmat was designed by Paul Rudolph for the German firm Carl Zeiss AG in 1890 and marketed as the Protar; it consisted of four elements in two groups, as an asymmetric arrangement of two cemented achromatic lens doublets and was improved to a five-element, two-group design in 1891, substituting a cemented triplet for the rear group.

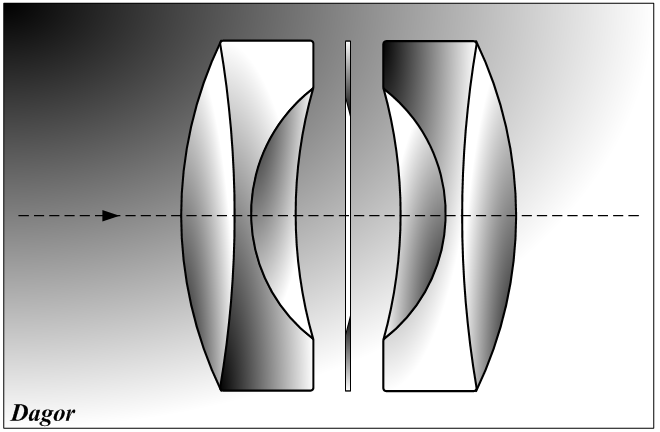
Goerz Dagor (von Höegh, 1892)

In 1892, the Swiss mathematician Emil von Höegh designed the Dagor (a.k.a. Double Anastigmatic Goerz) for Goerz, a symmetric lens with six elements in two groups, made of two cemented triplets. The Orthostigmat (1893) and Collinear (1895) were developed at around the same time by Steinheil and Voigtländer respectively, and had a similar symmetric construction, with six elements in two groups. At about the same time, Rudolph created the Double Protar (1894/1895), which consisted of eight elements in two groups.

Cooke triplet (Taylor, 1893)

The Cooke Triplet was developed by H. Dennis Taylor for T. Cooke & Sons in York and patented in 1893. Cooke was not interested in manufacturing the lens, so a smaller workshop in Leicester, Taylor, Taylor and Hobson (no relation), was contracted to build the lens, bearing the Cooke brand. Its relatively simple three-element, three-group construction gave it a cost advantage over prior designs.

Dallmeyer Stigmatic (Aldis, 1895)

J H Dallmeyer Ltd first released a series of anastigmatic lenses consisting of multiple cemented achromats in 1895, designed by Hugh L. Aldis, marketed as the Stigmatic. The first Stigmatic was a six-element, three-group design. Aldis simplified the lens to a three-element, two-group design after leaving Dallmeyer in 1901.

=== Later development ===
Zeiss anastigmats by Paul Rudolph

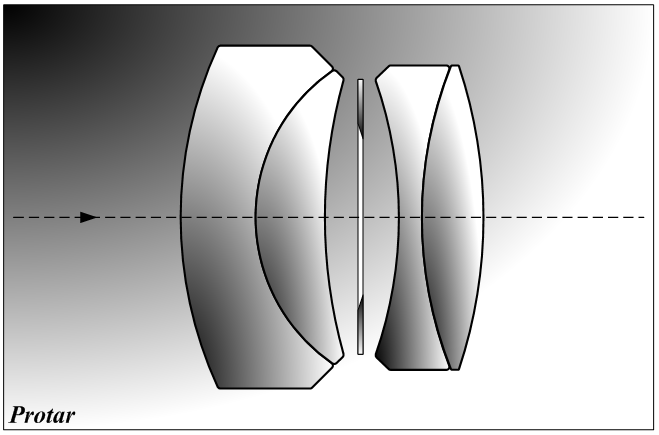
Protar (1890)

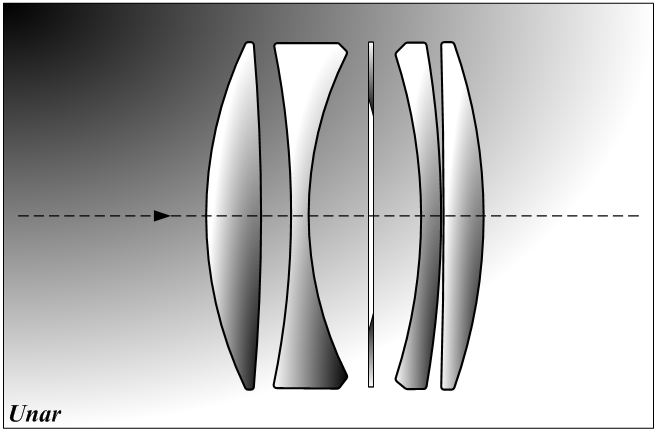
Unar (1899)

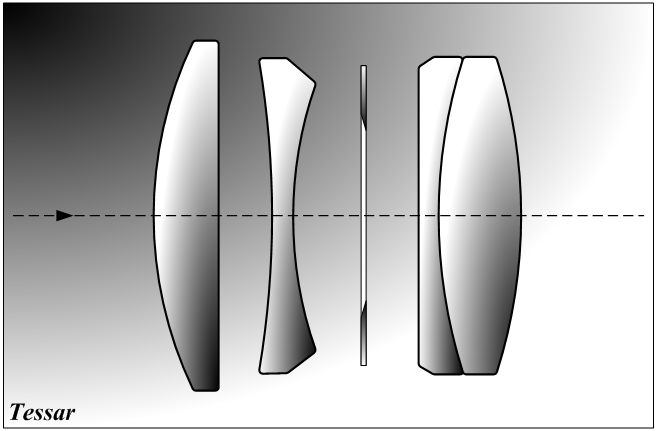
Tessar (1902)

Zeiss would withdraw the Anastigmat from the market in favor of the Unar and Tessar types, developed in the early 1900s. Rudolph's Unar (1899) was derived from the earlier Protar but used four elements in four groups, eliminating the cemented interfaces. This in turn was improved by returning to the cemented rear group, resulting in the enduring four-element, three-group Tessar design (1902). Although some have speculated that the Tessar was influenced by the earlier Cooke Triplet, Rudolf Kingslake emphatically declared that the Tessar design can clearly be traced from the Protar through the Unar.

At about the same time the Unar was released by Zeiss, von Höegh modified the Dagor as a symmetric lens with four elements in four groups, released by Goertz as the Type B in 1899 and later renamed Celor and Syntor. The so-called dialyte-type lens consists of a pair of air-spaced two-element achromats arranged back-to-back, and later was developed into the Goertz Artar by W. Zschokke. The Dagor also was modified by E. Arbeit, who removed one cemented surface, leaving it as a six-element, four-group design. The Schulz and Billerbeck company of Potsdam released Arbeit's modification as the Euryplan in 1903, generically known as the air-spaced Dagor. Paul Rudolph would go on to release a similar design for Hugo Meyer as the Plasmat in 1918.

The Cooke Triplet spawned a separate family of anastigmat lens designs, including the Voigtländer Heliar (designed by Hans Harting, 1900), Ludwig Bertele's Ernostar (1919), and the later Zeiss Sonnar (Bertele, 1929).

== Design ==
All modern photographic lenses are close to being anastigmatic, meaning that they can create extremely sharp images for all objects across their field of view; the underlying limitation is that the lens can deliver the anastigmatic performance only up to a maximum aperture (i.e., it has a minimum f-number) and only within a given working distance (focusing range). Note that all optical aberrations (except spherical aberration) become more pronounced towards the edges of the field of view, even with high-grade anastigmatic lenses.

Anastigmatic performance is accomplished by a proper combination of multiple lenses (optical surfaces), usually three or more. Aspheric lenses can minimize the number of surfaces required and thus the bulk and weight of the composite lens; however, aspheric surfaces are more costly to manufacture than spherical and other conic section (hyperbolic, parabolic) ones. Many high-end catoptric telescopes are three-mirror anastigmats, while the corresponding catadioptric telescopes use two mirrors (reflector) and one lens (refractor) to accomplish the same result.

== See also ==
- Stigmator, for the astigmatism correction of electron beams
