= Emil von Höegh =

German optical lens designer

- Born: May 10, 1865; Löwenberg in Schlesien, Kingdom of Prussia
- Died: January 29, 1915 (aged 49); Goslar
- Occupation: optical lens designer
- Known for: Dagor lens; Celor lens

Emil von Höegh (10 May 1865 – 29 January 1915) was an optical lens designer, known for inventing the first double anastigmatic camera lens called Dagor in 1892. In the same year, he began working for the German lens manufacturer Goerz, where he became the chief optical designer. At Goerz, he developed multiple lens designs, including the Höegh meniscus and Celor. He left the company in 1902.

The mountain Mount Hoegh in Antarctica is named in his honour.
