= 2018 in Scottish television =

This is a list of events in Scottish television from 2018.

== Events ==
=== April ===
- April – Students are able to enrol for the new National Film and Television School in Scotland.
- 1 April – 50th anniversary of the first edition of the BBC's Reporting Scotland.

=== May ===
- 16 May – STV announces that the STV2 local television network is to close at the end of the following month. and that it had sold the channel's assets to That's Media, owners of the That's TV network of local television stations in England.

=== June ===
- 30 June –
  - STV2 closes down and the channel's assets are sold to That's Media, owners of the That's TV network of local television stations in England.
  - The closure of STV2 results in the cancellation of STV News Tonight.

=== September ===
- 7 September – The Edinburgh edition of STV News at Six ends and is replaced on the 10th by shorter opt-outs within a Central Scotland programme.

=== October ===
- 15 October – That's TV Scotland launches as the replacement local television service in Aberdeen, Ayr, Dundee, Edinburgh and Glasgow.

== Debuts ==
=== Cbeebies ===
- 12 November – Molly and Mack (2018–2022)

== Television series ==
- Reporting Scotland (1968–1983; 1984–present)
- Sportscene (1975–present)
- Landward (1976–present)
- The Beechgrove Garden (1978–present)
- Eòrpa (1993–present)
- Only an Excuse? (1993–2020)
- River City (2002–2026)
- The Adventure Show (2005–present)
- Daybreak Scotland (2007–present)
- An Là (2008–present)
- Trusadh (2008–present)
- STV Rugby (2009–2010; 2011–present)
- STV News at Six (2009–present)
- The Nightshift (2010–present)
- Scotland Tonight (2011–present)
- Shetland (2013–present)
- Scot Squad (2014–present)
- Still Game (2002–2007; 2016–2019)
- Two Doors Down (2016–present)

== Deaths ==
- 25 April – Edith MacArthur, 92, actress (Take the High Road)

== See also ==
- 2018 in Scotland
