= Goerz Minicord =

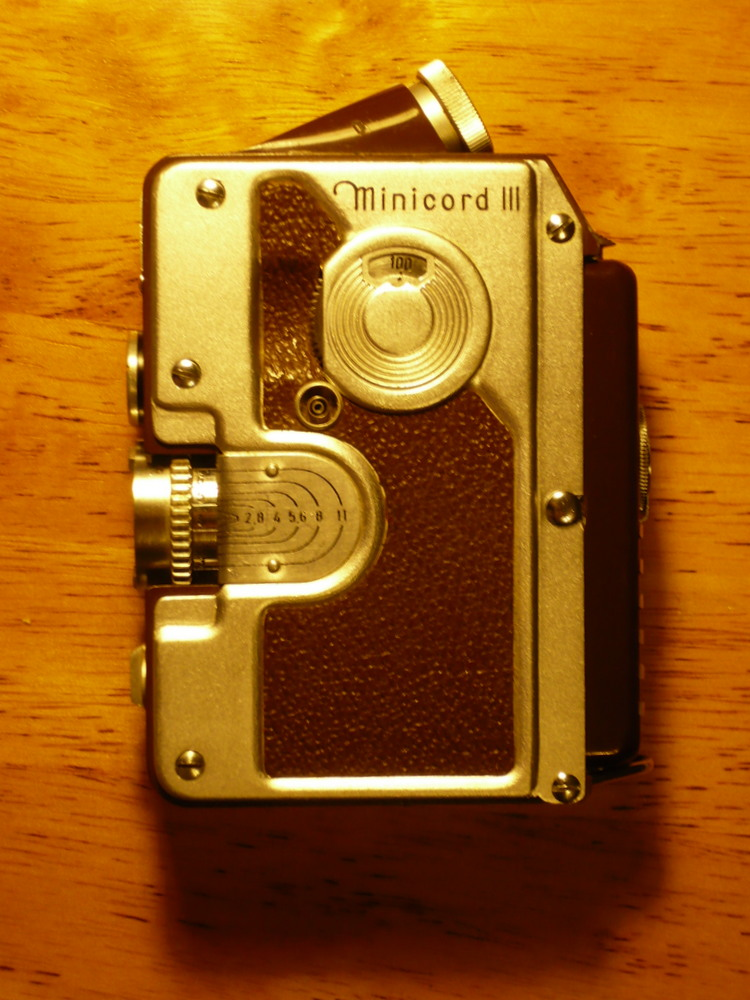
Goerz Minicord III

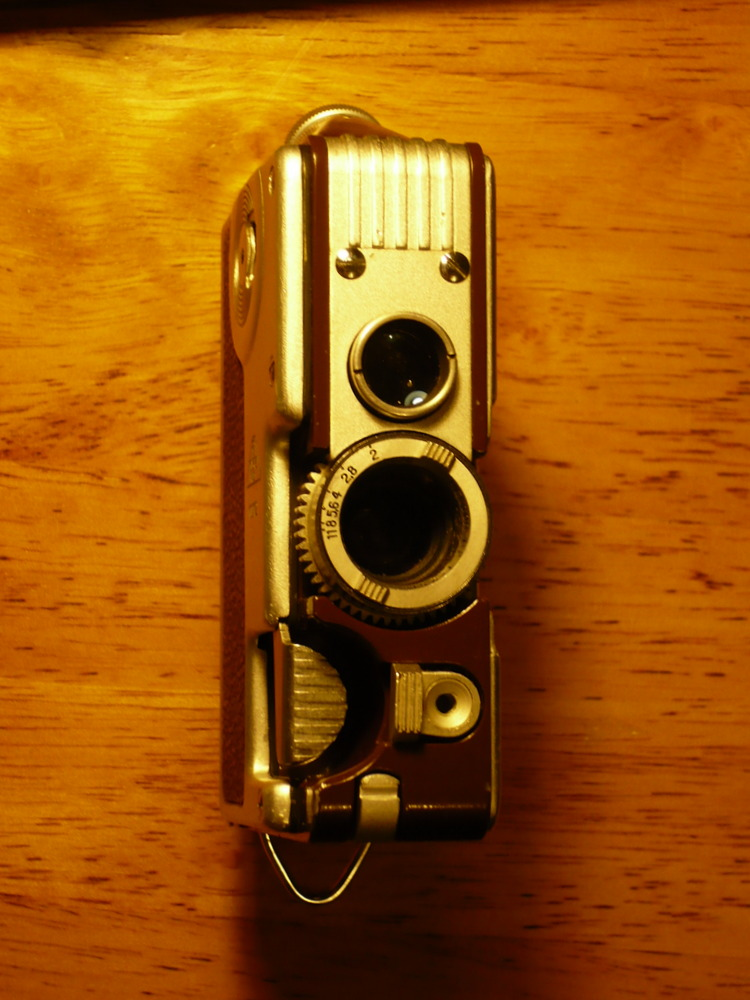
Minicord front view

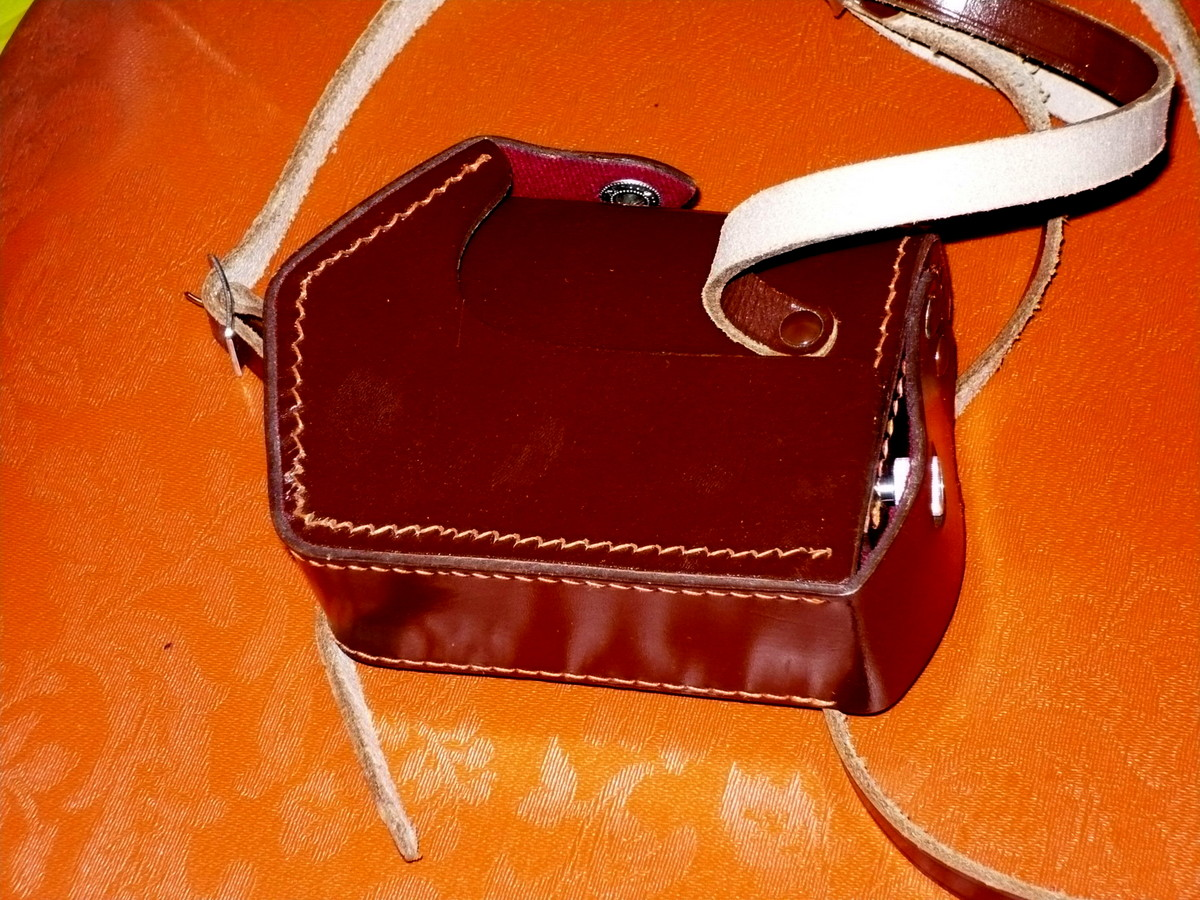
Goerz minicordn deluxe leather case

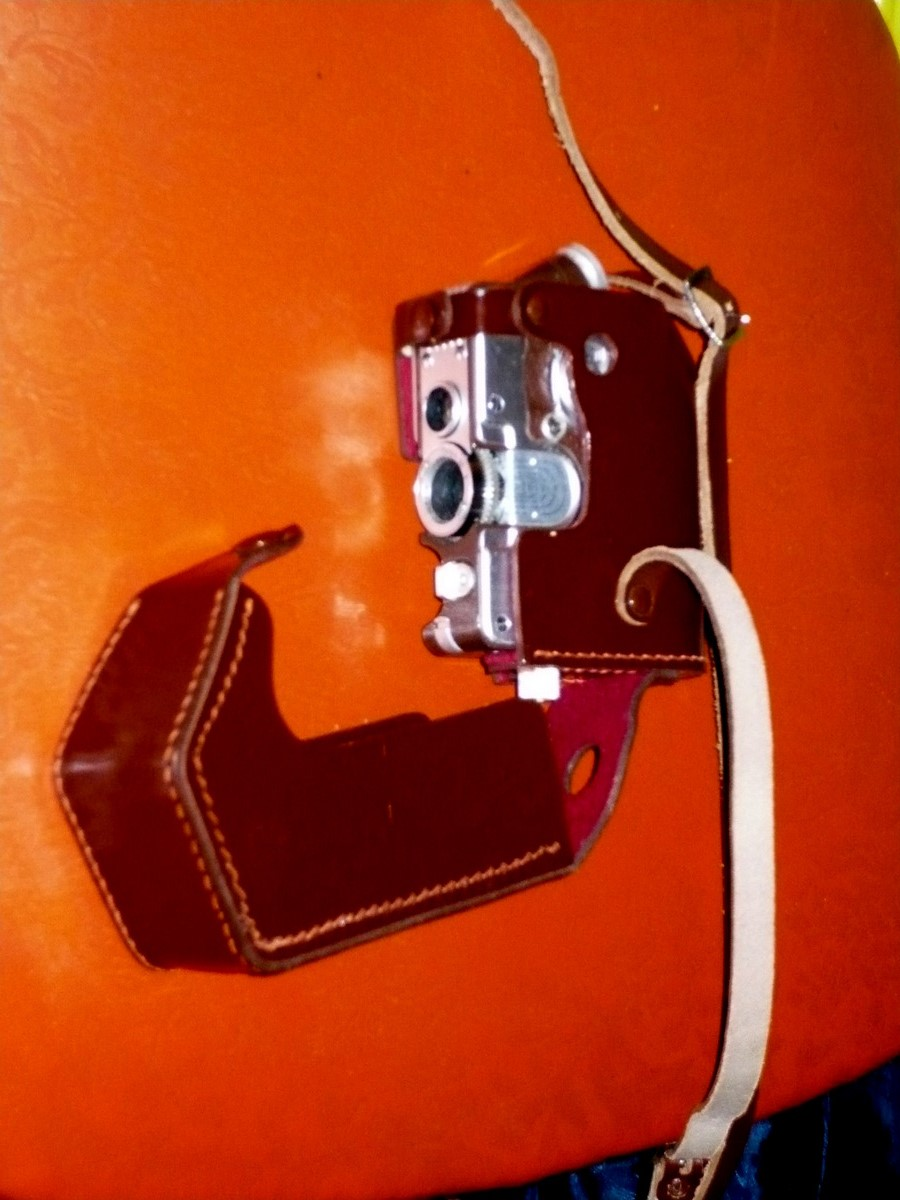
Goerz minicord with deluxe leather case

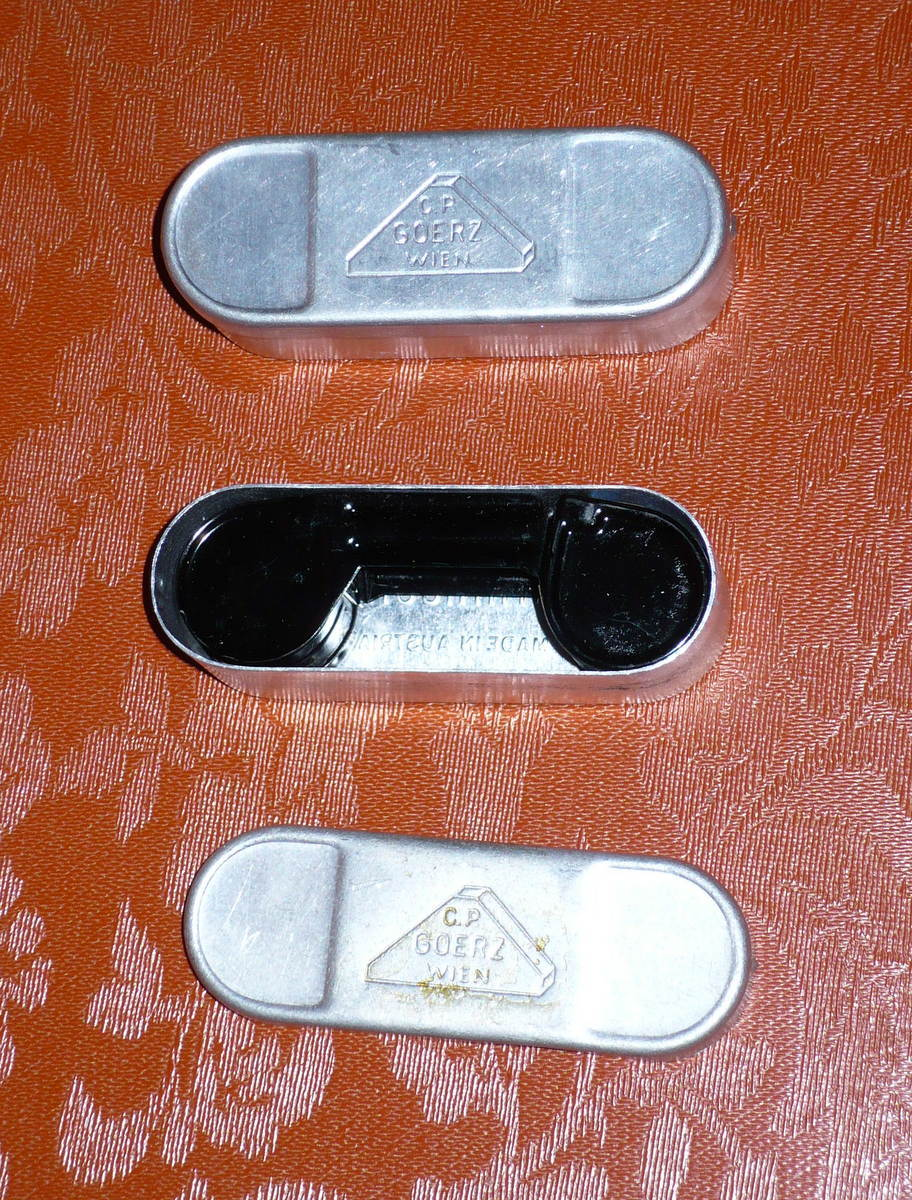
Goerz Minicord cassettes

Goerz Minicord is a 16 mm twin lens reflex 16 mm subminiature camera made by C.P.Goerz of Austria in 1951. It is one of the three top-quality subminiature cameras (the others are Minox and made in Italy Gami 16).

Minicord length 114 mm, 71 mm deep, and 30 mm wide. It is slightly larger than a pack of cigarettes.

The taking lens is a six-element coated Helgor 25 mm F2 lens, focusing from 12 inches to infinity. A depth of field table is built into the camera panel. Aperture 2, 2.8, 4, 5.6, 8, 11.

The viewing lens is linked to the taking lens. Light rays entering the viewing lens are refracted by a prism and form a bright, life-size image on a piece of ground glass; the eyepiece is adjustable for sharp image. Unlike an ordinary twin lens reflex camera, the Goerz Minicord image is not only right side up, but also unreversed, due to the use of a prism instead of mirror. Minicord is the only twin lens reflex camera in 16 mm subminiature photography.

Minicord has an all-metal focal plane shutter, speed: B, 1/10, 1/25, 1/50/, 1/100, 1/200, 1/400.

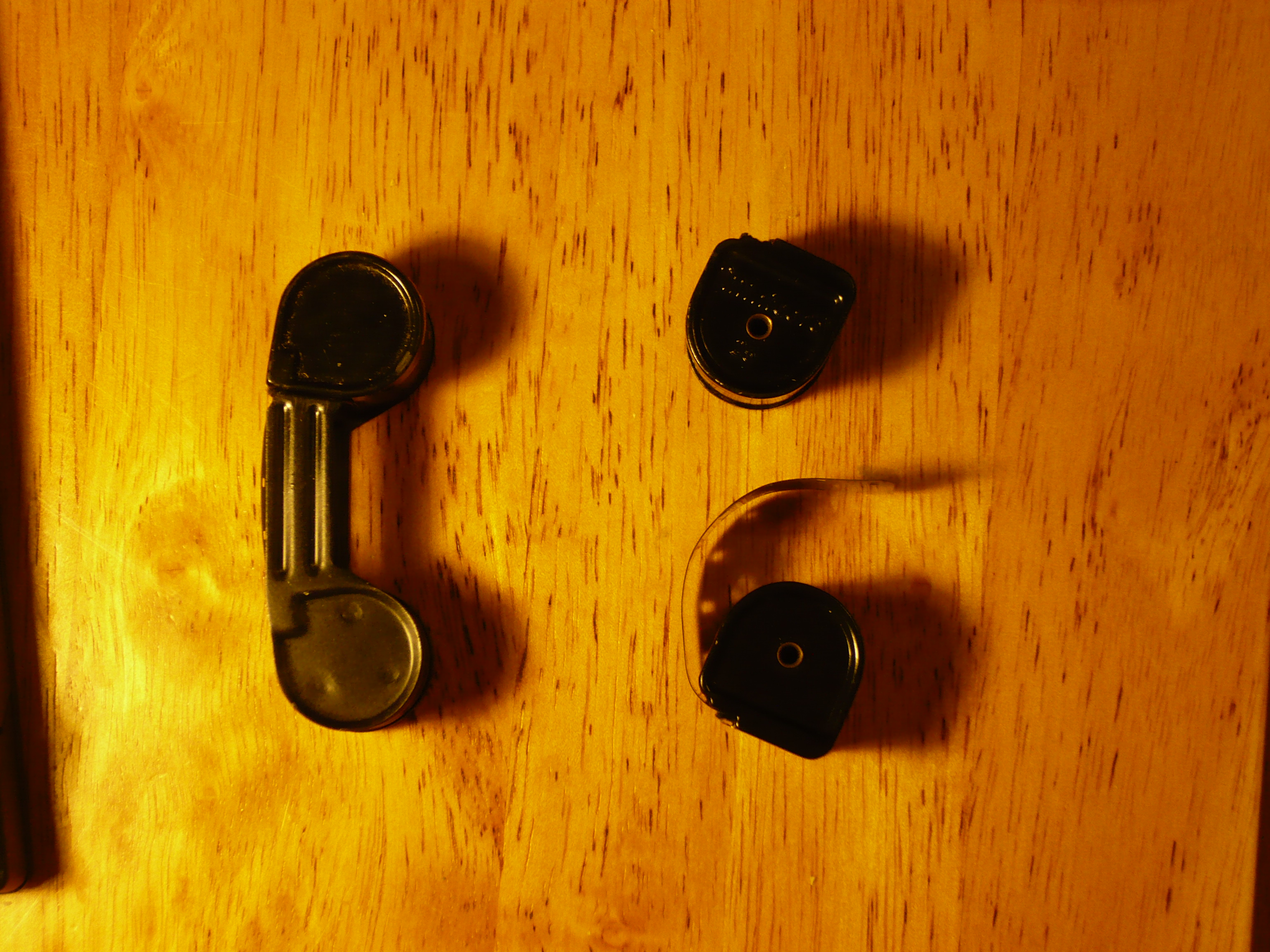
Minicord cassettes

Film: double-perforated 16 mm film in special Minicord cassette, image size 10 mm × 10 mm.

In 1953, C.P.Goerz introduced Goerz Minicord III, with key feature same as previous model, but with flash sync added.
