= Dual speed focuser =

A dual speed focuser, replacing the original rack and pinion focuser of the Orion hit XT 10 dobsonian telescope.

The dual speed focuser is a focusing mechanism used in precision optics such as advanced amateur astronomical telescopes and laboratory microscopes.

A dual speed focuser can provide two focusing speeds by using a set of co-axial knobs, one for fast focusing and another for fine focusing when the film or CCD is near the perfect focal plane. This is different from the two separate focusing knobs seen on low level microscopes. Another common reason to employ a dual-speed focuser is with the use of short focal length eyepieces, where the depth of focus is short, requiring critically accurate focusing.

A dual speed focusing mechanism is often combined with a Crayford focuser, forming a Dual speed Crayford focuser in order to eliminate backlash during fine focusing.

== The concept ==
Dual speed focuser design borrows the planetary gearing idea used in automobile gearboxes. However, in order to eliminate backlash, balls and axles are used instead of gears. All the transmission inside a dual speed focuser is achieved via static friction.

The cylinder case of a dual speed focuser is fixed on the telescope tube. Three metal balls are placed 120° apart inside the case in a holder shelf. An input axle penetrates through the hole on the center of the holder shelf and is pushed and tightened by three surrounding balls. The fine focusing knob connects to the input axle while the fast focusing knob connects to the holder shelf. On the other side, the axle from the Crayford focuser is connected to the holder shelf.

When one rotates the fine focusing knob, the three balls are driven by the input axle and rotate along the inner circumference of the case at a slower speed. The metal balls then push the holder shelf and drive the output axle. As a result, rotating either of the focusing knobs will cause the other to rotate in the same direction.

== Calculation ==
The angular velocity of input and output axle can be described by the formula:

$$\omega '=\frac{\omega r}{2(R+r)}$$,

where the R and r are the radius of metal ball and input axle, and the $\omega$ and $\omega '$ are the angular velocities of the input and output axles.

A 1:10 dual speed focuser has a gear ratio of 10 and R=4.5r. Thus the angular velocity ratio is actually 11. The gear ratio and velocity ratio should not be confused with each other.
