= 2018 in Wales =

- Centuries: 19th; 20th; 21st
- Decades: 1990s; 2000s; 2010s; 2020s
- See also: List of years in Wales; Timeline of Welsh history 2018 in The United Kingdom England Scotland Elsewhere

This article is about the particular significance of the year 2018 to Wales and its people.

== Incumbents ==
- First Minister – Carwyn Jones (until 12 December), Mark Drakeford (starting 13 December)
- Secretary of State for Wales – Alun Cairns
- Archbishop of Wales – John Davies, Bishop of Swansea and Brecon
- Archdruid of the National Eisteddfod of Wales – Geraint Llifon
- National Poet of Wales – Ifor ap Glyn

== Events ==
=== January ===
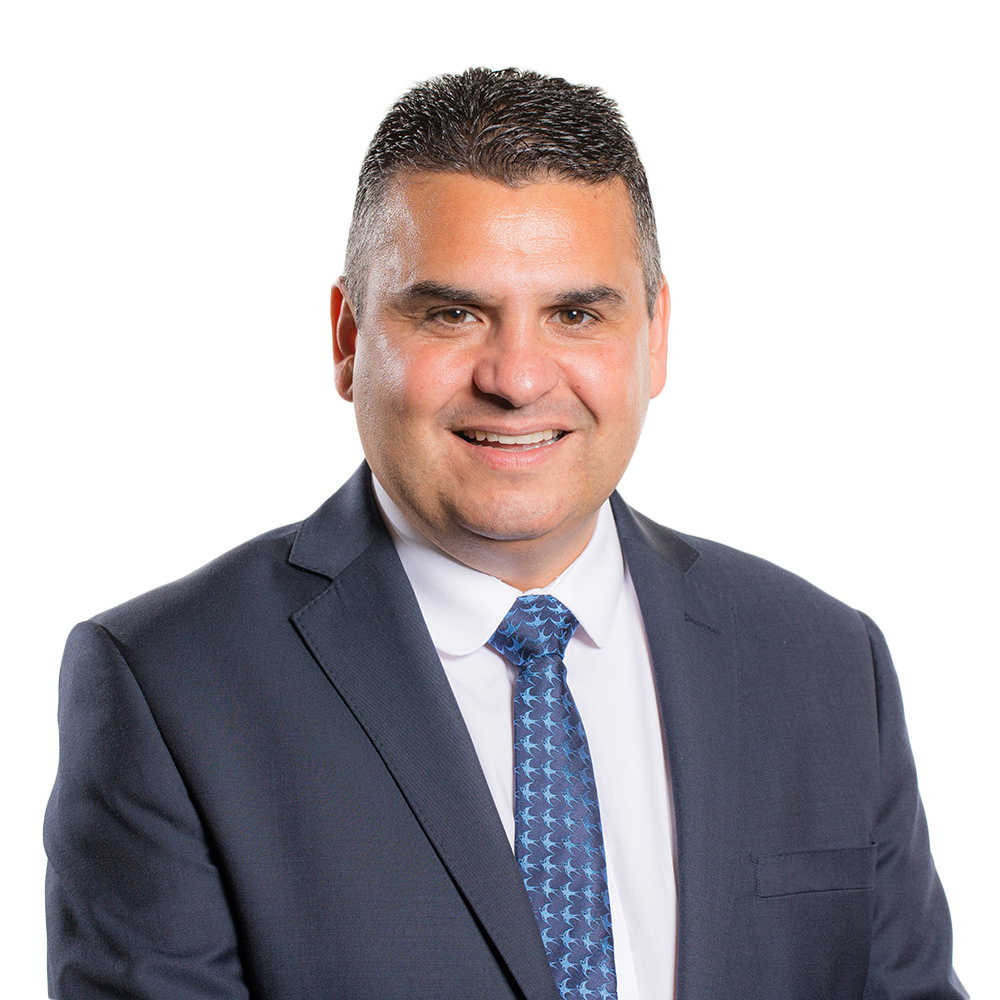
16 Jan: Neil McEvoy, AM, expelled by Plaid Cymru

- 16 January – Controversial Assembly member Neil McEvoy is expelled from the Plaid Cymru group in the Welsh Assembly, with the statement that "His ongoing behaviour has left assembly member colleagues feeling undermined and demoralised".
- 30 January – In his trial at Woolwich Crown Court, Darren Osborne claims to have had assistance in carrying out the 2017 Finsbury Park attack and reveals links with Welsh far-right groups.

=== February ===
- 1 February – Darren Osborne is convicted of murder for the 2017 Finsbury Park attack and is sentenced to life imprisonment.
- 6 February – 2018 Alyn and Deeside by-election: Jack Sargeant wins the by-election for the National Assembly for Wales constituency of Alyn and Deeside, triggered by the death of his father, incumbent Labour AM Carl Sargeant.
- 17 February – Cwmllynfell is the epicentre of a 4.4 magnitude earthquake, the biggest in the UK for ten years.

=== March ===
- 1 March – Storm Emma causes widespread disruption in Wales, with heavy snowfall and strong winds in many places and the Met Office issuing a red warning and the public being advised to stay indoors if possible.
- 29 March – UK prime minister Theresa May visits South Wales as part of a nationwide tour in the run-up to Brexit.

=== April ===
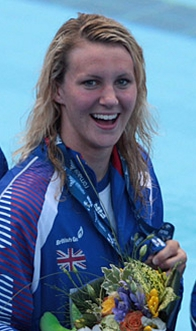
Jazz Carlin

- 4 April – Swimmer Jazz Carlin carries the Welsh flag at the opening ceremony of the 2018 Commonwealth Games, where Wales fields a team of 214 athletes, competing in 16 sports.
- 23 April
  - At the conference of the Wales Labour Party, First Minister Carwyn Jones announces that he will stand down later in the year.
  - Catherine, Duchess of Cambridge, gives birth to a son, a third grandchild for Charles, Prince of Wales.

=== May ===
- 6 May - Cardiff City Football Club gain promotion to the Premier League, after results go their way on the final day of the football season.
- 11 May – The short list for the Wales Book of the Year award for 2018 is announced. Contenders in the various categories include Thomas Dilworth, Gwyneth Lewis, Peredur Lynch, Robert Minhinnick and Mihangel Morgan.
- 19 May – Prince Henry of Wales, younger son of the Prince of Wales, is created Duke of Sussex on his wedding day.

=== June ===
- 7 June – James Howell & Co, Cardiff's oldest surviving department store, is earmarked for closure by its owners, House of Fraser.
- 8 June – Welsh names mentioned in the Queen's 2018 Birthday Honours include novelist Ken Follett (CBE), scientist Graham Hutchings (CBE), astronomer Haley Gomez (MBE) and Paralympic athlete Menna Fitzpatrick (MBE).
- 22 June – The state government of Meghalaya announces that 22 June, the date of Thomas Jones's arrival at Sohra, will be celebrated as "Thomas Jones Day" every year.
- 27 June – Andrew R. T. Davies announces his resignation as leader of the Conservative group in the Welsh Assembly.

=== July ===
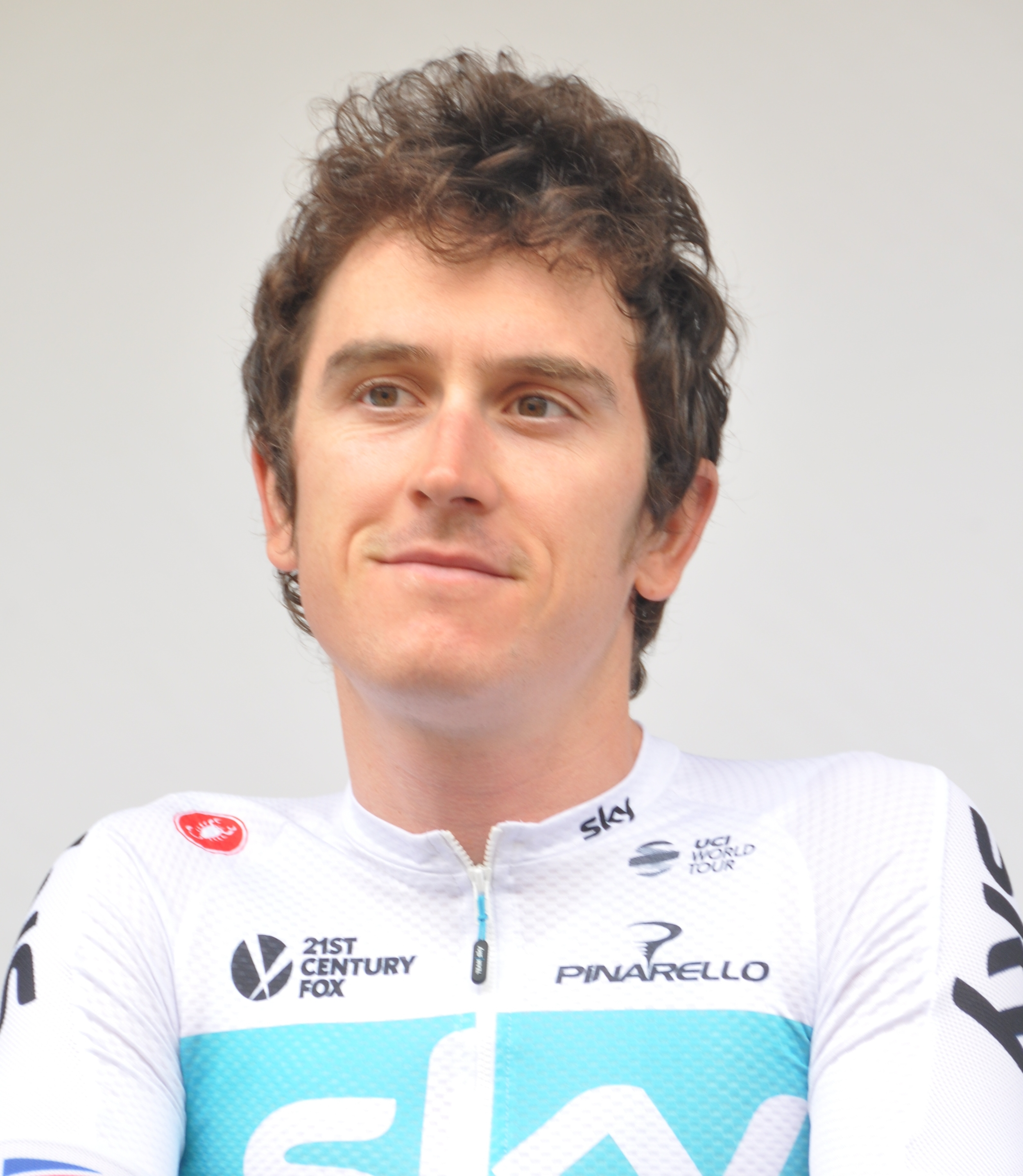
Geraint Thomas

- 29 July – Cardiff cyclist Geraint Thomas becomes the first Welshman ever to win the Tour de France, finishing in 83h 17' 13".

=== August ===
- 3 August - the "fence-free" National Eisteddfod of Wales opens in Cardiff Bay.
- 10 August – AM Gareth Bennett is elected leader of UKIP in the Welsh Assembly.
- 13 August – New UKIP Assembly leader Gareth Bennett is criticised by First Minister Carwyn Jones and other Assembly members for supporting Boris Johnson in his criticism of Muslim women's dress.

=== September ===
- 6 September – Paul Davies is elected the new leader of the Conservative opposition in the Welsh Assembly.
- 10 September – Leanne Wood, campaigning for re-election as leader of Plaid Cymru, claims that the other candidates, Adam Price and Rhun ap Iorwerth, would be prepared to "strike a deal with the Conservatives".
- 28 September – Adam Price wins the election to be the new leader of Plaid Cymru; he supports the idea of a second referendum on Brexit.

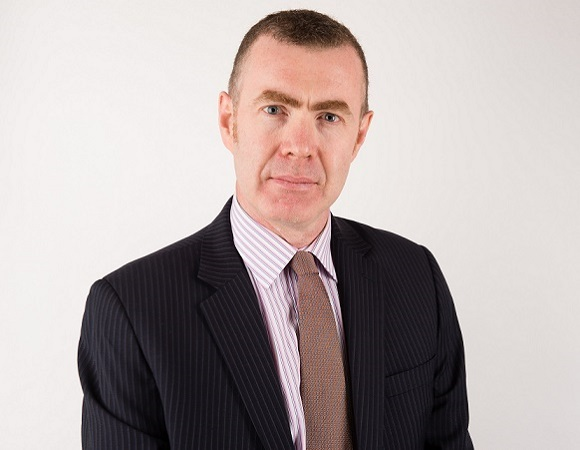
New Plaid Cymru leader, Adam Price

=== October ===
- 5 October – In a speech at the Plaid Cymru annual conference, new leader Adam Price states that independence for Wales should be considered following Brexit.

=== November ===
- 28 November – First Minister Carwyn Jones gives evidence at the inquest into the death of AM Carl Sargeant.

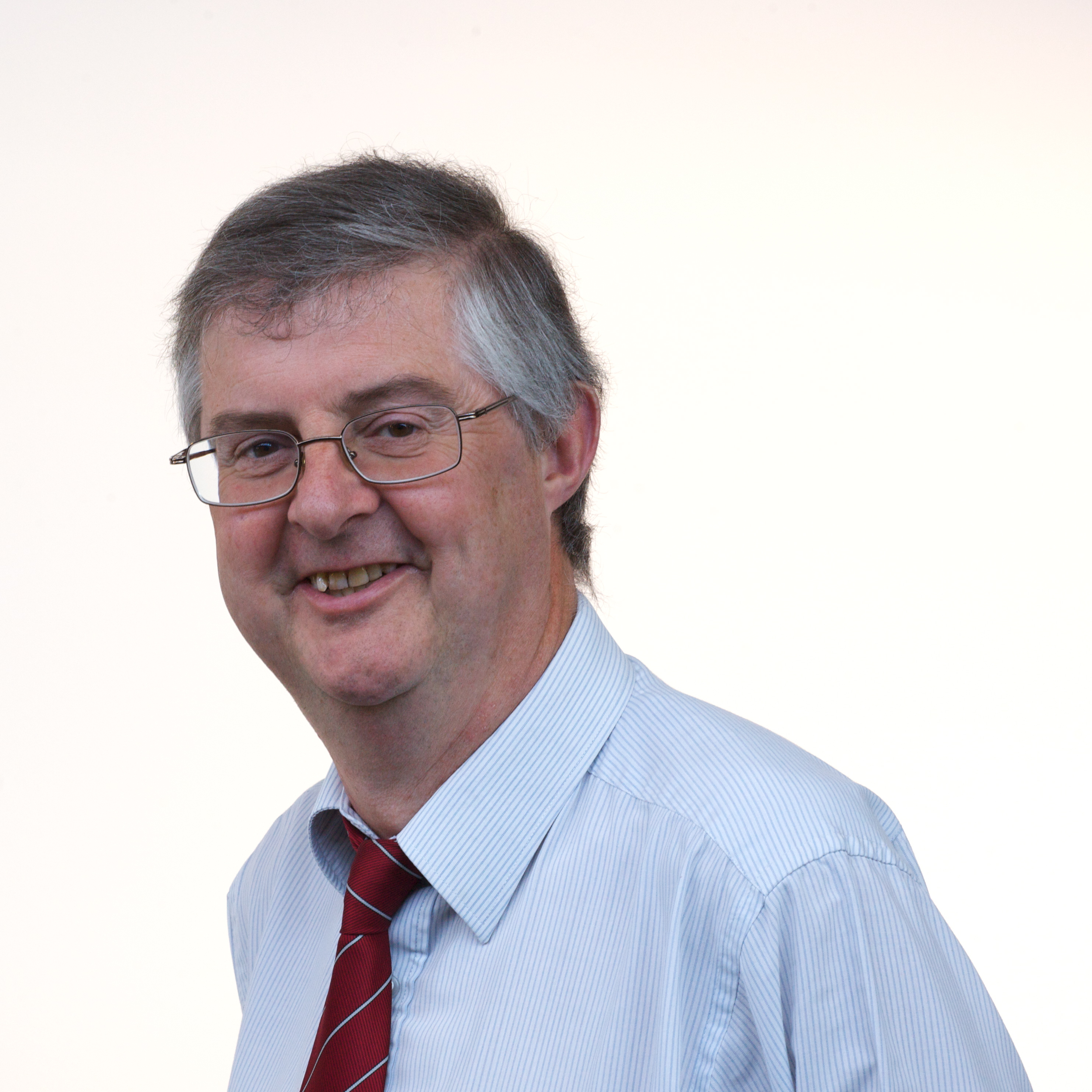
Mark Drakeford, newly elected leader of the Welsh Labour Party and First Minister of Wales

=== December ===
- 3 December – "Gwenwyn", by Alffa, becomes the first Welsh language single to achieve one million plays on Spotify.
- 6 December – Mark Drakeford wins the Welsh Labour Party leadership election to become the Welsh Labour Party's new leader and front runner to take over the job of First Minister of Wales from the incumbent Carwyn Jones.
- 12 December – Mark Drakeford is elected First Minister for Wales, with 30 Assembly members' votes.
- 19 December – BBC Wales reveals the results of research, showing that Wales is receiving less benefit than some individual districts of London from the National Lottery Fund. Oswyn Hughes, head of campaigns for the National Lottery in Wales, says there are "a number of reasons" for the difference.
- 28 December – Welsh recipients of New Year's Honours are named; they include Geraint Thomas (OBE), Mike Peters (MBE), athlete Helen Jenkins (MBE) and former cricketer Matthew Maynard (MBE).

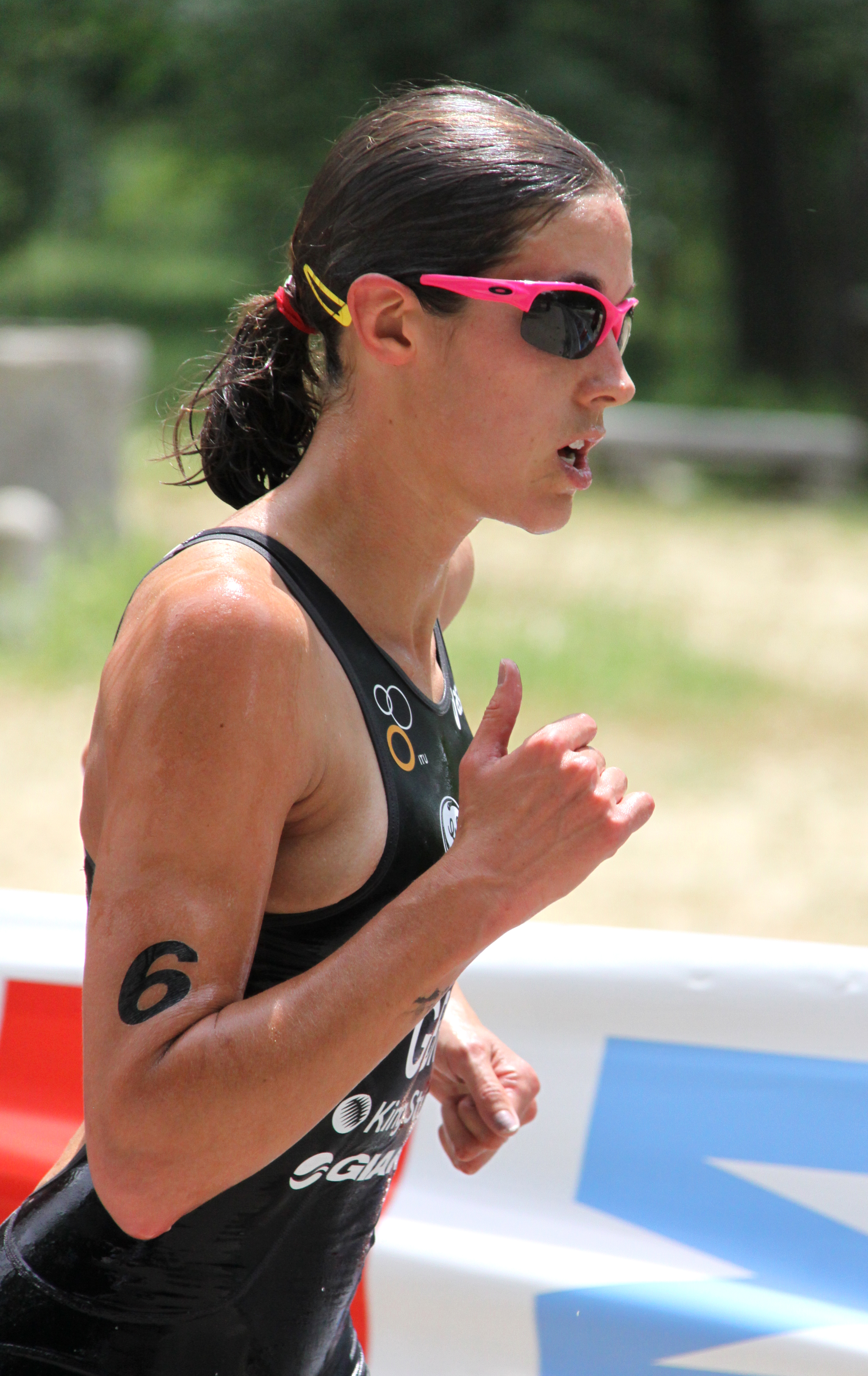
Helen Jenkins, MBE

== Arts and culture ==
=== National Eisteddfod of Wales ===
- Chair – Gruffudd Eifion Owen
- Crown – Catrin Dafydd
- Prose Medal – Manon Steffan Ros
- Gwobr Goffa Daniel Owen: Mari Williams

=== Welsh Awards ===
- Wales Book of the Year 2018
  - English language: Robert Minhinnick, Diary of the Last Man
  - Welsh language: Goronwy Wynne, Blodau Cymru: Byd y Planhigion

=== New books ===
==== English language ====
- Malcolm Nash – Not Only, But Also: My Life in Cricket
- Meic Stephens – Rhys Davies – A Writer's Life

==== Welsh language ====
- Daniel Davies – Arwyr
- Geraint Evans – Digon i'r Diwrnod
- Llwyd Owen – Pyrth Uffern
- Manon Rhys – Stafell fy Haul

=== Music ===
==== New albums ====
- Phil Campbell and the Bastard Sons – The Age Of Absurdity
- Dafydd Iwan – Ugain O'r Galon
- Manic Street Preachers – Resistance Is Futile
- Wigwam – Coelcerth

==== New compositions ====
- Paul Mealor – Symphony No 3: Illumination
- Huw Watkins – Spring

=== Film ===
- Eternal Beauty, written and directed by Craig Roberts, filmed in Wales and co-starring Robert Pugh.
- Gwen, starring Eleanor Worthington Cox, produced by Hilary Bevan Jones.

=== Television ===
- A Discovery of Witches, filmed on location in Wales and at Cardiff's Bad Wolf Studios, premiers of Sky One.

=== Visual arts ===
- 18 December – Banksy mural Season's Greetings appears in Port Talbot.

== Sport ==
=== In sports ===
- Association football
  - 15 January – Ryan Giggs is named as manager of the Wales national football team, succeeding Chris Coleman, who left the position in November 2017.
  - 3 November – Cardiff City F.C. lose at home to Leicester City F.C. in the visiting side's first match since the death of their owner, Vichai Srivaddhanaprabha, in a helicopter crash one week earlier.
- Horse racing
  - 6 January – the postponed 2017 Welsh Grand National is run at Chepstow Racecourse and won by Raz De Maree. The winner is ridden by 16-year-old James Bowen, who becomes the youngest jockey to win the race.
  - 27 December – Elegant Escape, ridden by Tom O'Brien and trained by Colin Tizzard, wins the 2018 Welsh Grand National at Chepstow.
- 2018 Winter Olympics
  - 18 February – Wrexham's Laura Deas wins a bronze medal in the skeleton at the 2018 Winter Olympics in Pyeongchang, South Korea.
- 2018 Commonwealth Games
  - 5 April – Para-cyclist James Ball wins Wales's first medal of the Games, a silver in the men's B&VI 1,000m time trial.
  - 6 April – Cyclist Lewis Oliva wins silver in the men's Keirin, while Gareth Irfon Evans wins Wales's first gold of the Games in the Men's 69 kg.
  - 9 April – Wales win a further three golds, two silvers and a bronze to surpass the medal total from the previous Commonwealth Games.
- 2018 Tour de France (road bicycle racing)
  - 29 July – Geraint Thomas is overall winner.
- Snooker
  - 7 May – Mark Williams wins the World Snooker Championship for the third time by defeating John Higgins 17–15 in the final.

=== Awards ===
- 12 December – Geraint Thomas wins the BBC Sports Personality of the Year Award.

== Broadcasting ==
=== English-language television ===
- Charlotte Church and Rhod Gilbert are among celebrities who participate in BBC Wales documentaries about mental health issues, linked to the "Welsh Happiness Day" project.
- Keeping Faith, the English-language version of Un Bore Mercher, is aired on BBC Wales.
- BBC Wales launches a "Festival of Funny" for the month of October, including the new series Tourist Trap, starring Sally Phillips.

=== English-language radio ===
- Jamie Owen's Wales

=== Welsh-language television ===
- Craith (7 January)

=== Welsh-language radio ===
- The BBC launches a new station, Radio Cymru 2, opening with presenters Dafydd Du and Caryl Parry Jones.

== Deaths ==
- 4 January – Ray Thomas, 76, musician of Welsh extraction
- 7 January – Bryn Crossley, 59, jockey
- 11 January – Ednyfed Hudson Davies, 88, politician, MP for Conway (1966–1970) and Caerphilly (1979–1983). (death announced on this date)
- 25 January – Keith Pring, 74, Welsh international footballer
- 29 January – Alfred Gooding, 85, entrepreneur
- 1 March – Beth Morris, 74, actress
- 15 March – Gwilym Roberts, 89, politician
- 17 March – Nicholas Edwards, Baron Crickhowell, 84, former Secretary of State for Wales
- 18 March – Ivor Richard, Baron Richard, 85, politician and diplomat, Lord Privy Seal (1997–1998) and former ambassador to the UN
- 21 April – Les Pearce, rugby league player and coach, 94
- 23 April – Barrie Williams, football coach and manager, 79
- 1 May – Peter Temple-Morris, Baron Temple-Morris, politician, 80
- 13 May – Gareth Powell Williams, rugby union player, 63
- 14 May – Abdulrahim Abby Farah, Welsh-born Somali diplomat and politician, 98
- 18 June – Frank Vickery, playwright, 67
- 29 June – Helen Griffin, actress, playwright and screenwriter, 59
- 1 July – Julian Tudor Hart, doctor and politician, 91
- 3 July – Meic Stephens, journalist and critic, 79
- 23 July – Haydn Morgan, 81, rugby player
- 9 August – Arthur Davies, operatic tenor, 77 (death announced on this date)
- 12 August – Betty Gray, table tennis player, 96.
- 1 September – Kenneth Bowen, operatic tenor, 86
- 5 September – Rachael Bland, journalist and presenter, 40 (breast cancer)
- 16 September – Tommy Best, footballer, 97
- 2 October – Ceri Peach, 78, geographer
- 10 October – Denzil Davies, 80, politician, MP for Llanelli (1970–2005).
- 19 November – John Mantle, 76, Wales rugby union and rugby league international.
