= Stigmator =

A stigmator is a component of electron microscopes that reduces astigmatism of the beam by imposing a weak electric or magnetic quadrupole field on the electron beam.

== Background ==
Quadrupole field created by four wires. The principle of a stigmator is that the current through each of the wires would be adjusted to change the shape of the beam.

For early electron microscopes - between the 1940s and 1960s - astigmatism was one of the main performance limiting factors. Sources of this astigmatism include misaligned objectives, non-uniform magnetic fields in the lenses (which were especially hard to correct), imperfectly circular lenses, and contamination on the objective aperture. Therefore, to improve resolution, the astigmatism had to be corrected. The first stigmators used in commercial electron microscopes were introduced in the early 1960s.

The stigmatic correction is done using an electric or magnetic field perpendicular to the beam. By adjusting the magnitude and azimuth of the stigmator field, asymmetric astigmatization can be compensated for. Stigmators produce weak fields compared to the electromagnetic lenses they correct, as usually only minor correction are necessary.

== Number of poles ==
Stigmators create a quadrupole field, and thus have to consist of at least four poles, but hexapole, octopole and dodecapole stigmatizors are also used, with octopole stigmators being the most common. The octopole (or higher order of poles) stigmatizers also produce a quadrupole field, but use their additional poles to align the imposed field with the direction of the stigmatization ellipticity.

== Types ==
=== Magnetic stigmator ===
The magnetic stigmator is a weak cylindrical lens that can correct the cylindrical component of the beam. It can consist of metal rods which induce a magnetic field, which are inserted with their long axis towards the beam center. By retracting or extending the rods, the astigmatism can be compensated.

=== Electromagnetic ===
Electromagnetic stigmators are stigmators that are integrated with the lenses and directly deform the magnetic field of the lens(es). These were the first types of stigmators to be used.

== Automatic stigmators ==
In most cases, the astigmatism can be corrected using a constant stigmator field which is adjusted by the microscope operator. The main cause of astigmatism, the non-uniform magnetic field produced by the lenses, usually does not change noticeable during a TEM session. A recent development are computer-controlled stigmators, which usually use the Fourier transform of the image to find the ideal stigmator setting. The Fourier transform of an astigmatic image is usually elliptically shaped. For a stigmatic image, it is round, this property can be used by algorithms to reduce the astigmatic aberration.

== Multiple stigmator systems ==
Normally, one stigmator is sufficient, but TEMs normally contain three stigmators: one to stigmatize the source beam, one to stigmatize real-space images, and one to stigmatize diffraction patterns. These are commonly referred to as condensor, objective, and intermediate (or diffraction) stigmators. The use of three post-sample stigmators is proposed to reduce linear distortion

== See also ==
- Anastigmat, a photographic lens completely corrected for the three main optical aberrations
