= 2018 in Scotland =

- Centuries: 19th; 20th; 21st
- Decades: 1990s; 2000s; 2010s; 2020s
- See also: List of years in Scotland; Timeline of Scottish history 2018 in: The UK • England • Wales • Elsewhere; Scottish football: 2017–18 • 2018–19; 2018 in Scottish television

Events from the year 2018 in Scotland.

== Incumbents ==
- First Minister – Nicola Sturgeon
- Secretary of State for Scotland – David Mundell

=== Law officers ===
- Lord Advocate – James Wolffe
- Solicitor General for Scotland – Alison Di Rollo
- Advocate General for Scotland – Lord Keen of Elie

=== Judiciary ===
- Lord President of the Court of Session and Lord Justice General – Lord Carloway
- Lord Justice Clerk – Lady Dorrian
- Chairman of the Scottish Land Court – Lord Minginish

== Events ==
- 1 January – More than 1,000 people brave the icy waters of the Firth of Forth for the annual New Year's Day Loony Dook.
- 7 February – The chief constable of Police Scotland, Phil Gormley, resigns amid a series of investigations into claims of gross misconduct.
- 26 April – Scottish Conservative Party leader Ruth Davidson announces that she is three months pregnant after receiving IVF treatment with her partner, Jen Wilson and is due to give birth in October.
- 1 May - Price of cheap high-strength increases as the Alcohol (Minimum Pricing) (Scotland) Act 2012 comes into force.
- 28 May – Lesley Laird is elected unopposed as deputy leader of the Scottish Labour Party.
- 15 June – Second major fire at Glasgow School of Art.
- 15 August – Iain Livingstone is confirmed as the new Chief Constable of Police Scotland, having been in interim charge of the national force since last autumn.
- 24 August – Former SNP First Minister Alex Salmond describes sexual misconduct allegations against him as "patently ridiculous" and is taking the Scottish Government to court to challenge the complaints procedure which has been activated against him.
- 3 September – Latest available data shows that SNP membership has overtaken the Conservatives across the UK for the first time ever, pushing the party of government into third place by quantity of members.
- 6 October – In the latest march organised by All Under One Banner, somewhere between 20,000 and 100,000 people are estimated to have marched through Edinburgh in support of Scottish independence.
- 12 October – Fair Isle gains its first 24-hour electricity supply, from renewable sources.

== Deaths ==
- 29 April – Michael Martin, Baron Martin of Springburn (born 1945), Labour politician and Speaker of the House of Commons 2000–2009.
- 31 May – Nairn MacEwan (born 1941), Scottish rugby union coach.

== Arts and literature ==
- 7 June – J. O. Morgan's war poem Assurances is published.
- 18 August – 45 years after forming in 1973, folk rock band Runrig performs their last show against the backdrop of Stirling Castle.
- 15 September – V&A at Dundee, designed by Kengo Kuma, opens as a museum of design.

== See also ==
- 2018 in England
- 2018 in Northern Ireland
- 2018 in Wales
