= John Wall (inventor) =

English design engineer

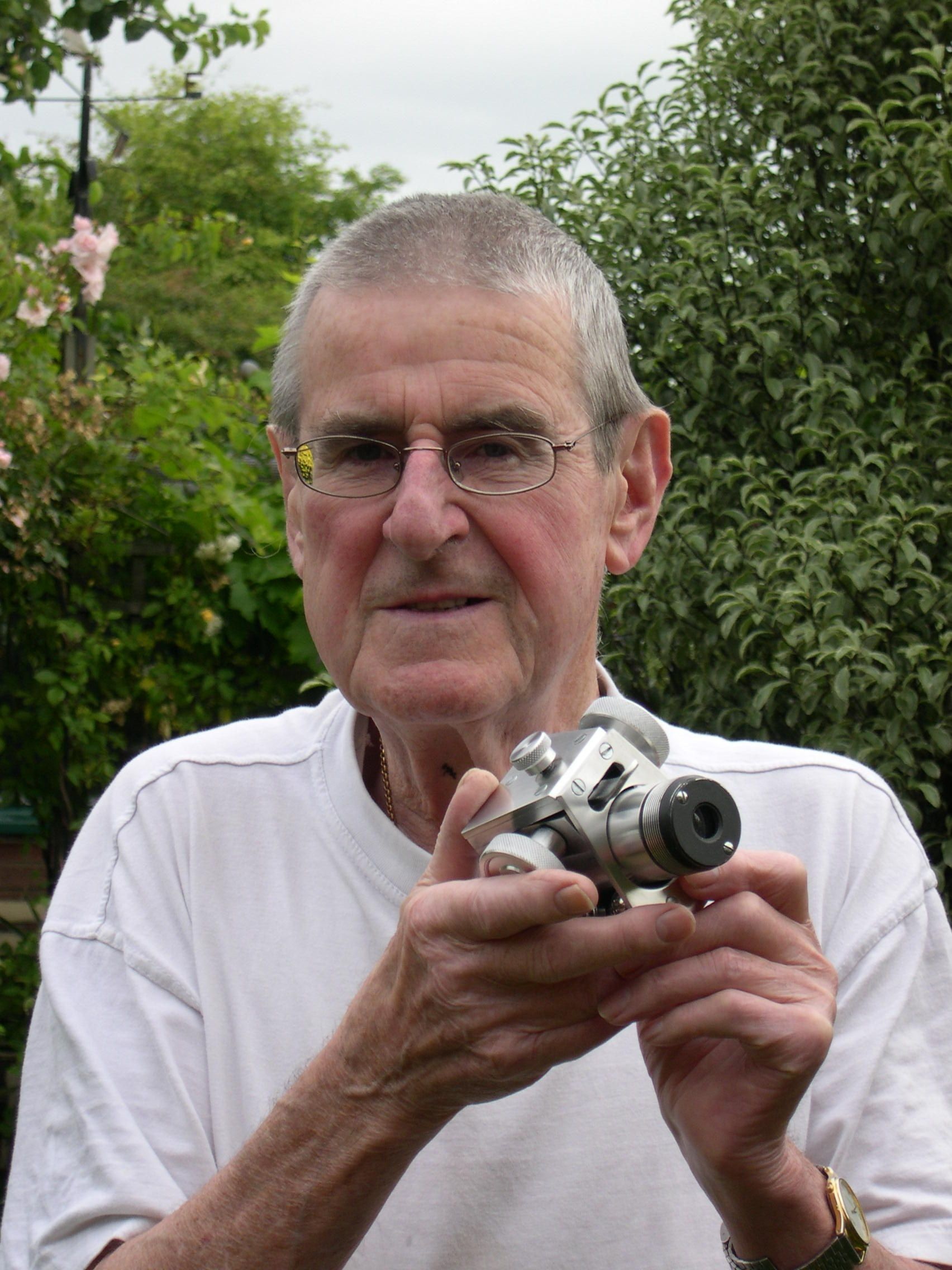
- John Wall
- Born: 26 June 1932; Crayford, Kent, England
- Died: 27 January 2018 (aged 85); Coventry, Warwickshire, England
- Engineering career
- Significant design: Crayford focuser
- Significant advance: dialyte based refracting telescopes

John Wall (26 June 1932 – 27 January 2018) was an English design engineer, amateur astronomer, amateur telescope maker and member of the British Astronomical Association. He lived in Coventry, England.

== Biography ==
Wall's aptitude for engineering won him an apprenticeship with Vickers Armstrong at the age of sixteen in the town of Crayford where he was born. He served in the army with the Royal Electrical and Mechanical Engineers in early 1950s and there became interested in telescopes and astronomy. He went on to become a design engineer at Vickers and, while working there in 1969, came up with the idea for an accurate mechanically simple eyepiece mount for amateur telescopes, the Crayford focuser.

He is also known for designing dialyte based refracting telescopes, coming up with the Zerochromat retrofocally corrected refractor, including a folded 30-inch f/12 version he built in 1999. This refracting telescope is the largest ever built by an individual and the eighth-largest refractor ever built.

Wall died on 27 January 2018.

== Inventions ==
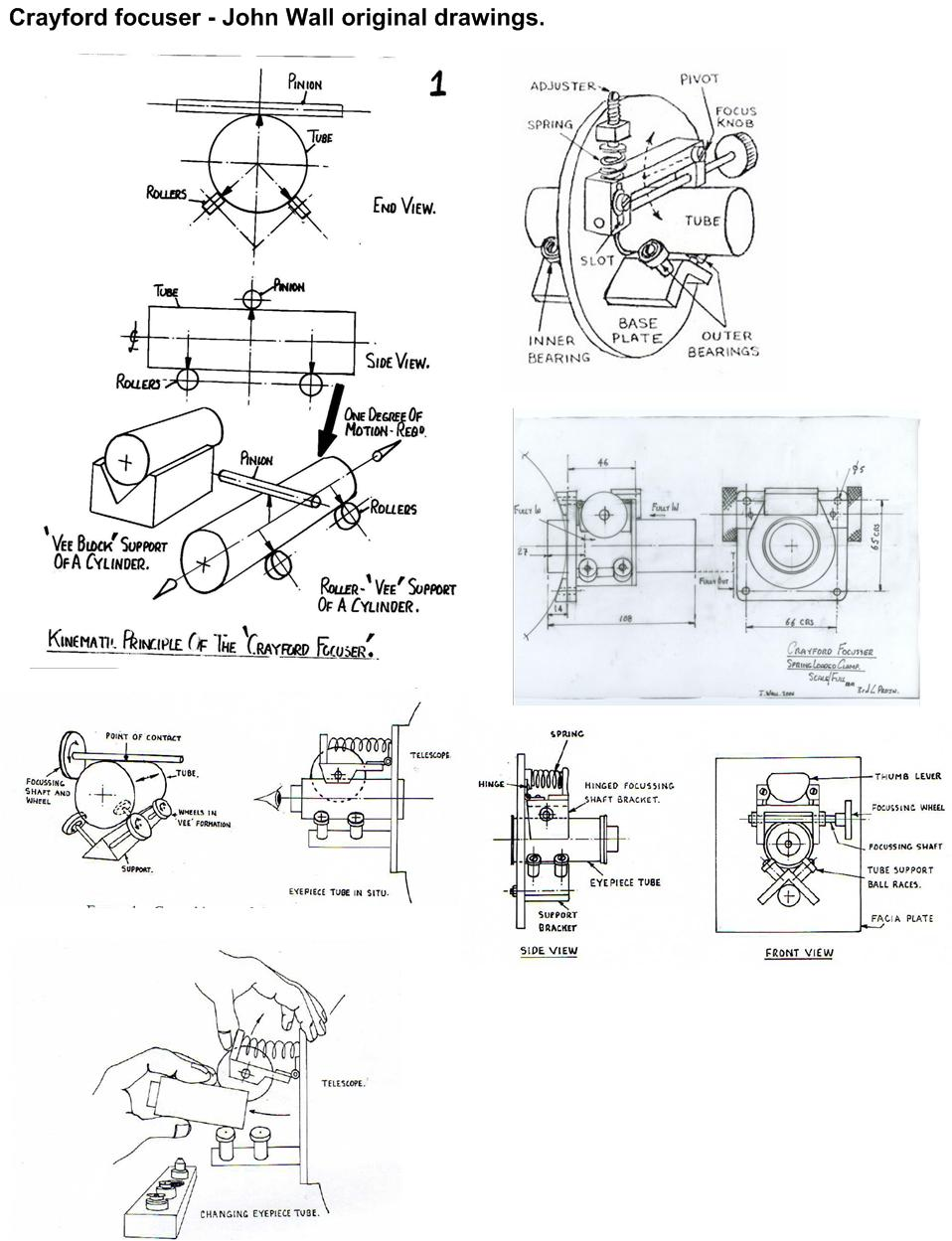
Drawings for the Crayford focuser

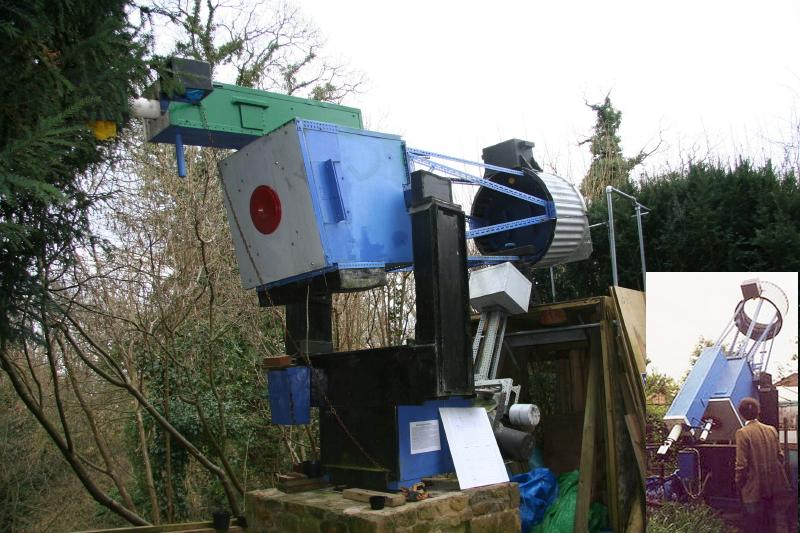
30-inch dialyte refracting telescope
