= Richard Doughty =

English cricketer (1960–2018)

Personal information
- Full name: Richard James Doughty
- Born: 17 November 1960; Bridlington, East Riding of Yorkshire, England
- Died: 6 February 2018 (aged 57)
- Batting: Right-handed
- Role: Bowler

Domestic team information
- Years: Team
- 1981–1984: Gloucestershire
- 1985–1987: Surrey

Career statistics
Competition	FC	List A
Matches	41	49
Runs scored	845	399
Batting average
100s/50s
Top score
Balls bowled
Wickets	89	29
Bowling average
5 wickets in innings
10 wickets in match
Best bowling
Catches/stumpings
- Source: Cricinfo, 29 July 2013

Richard Doughty (17 November 1960 – 6 February 2018) was an English cricketer. Primarily a bowler, he played for Gloucestershire between 1981 and 1984 and Surrey between 1985 and 1987.

Following a period of severe depression and illness which led him to spend a month in the Sporting Chance Clinic, a specialist rehabilitation clinic set up by former England and Arsenal captain Tony Adams for sports men and women, Doughty re-trained as a counsellor and from 2006 worked with various professional sports associations and organisations to mentor and advise professional athletes with addictive or psychological issues.

Doughty spoke extensively on behalf of the Professional Cricketers' Association (who had helped fund his rehabilitation with the Sporting Chance Clinic) and featured heavily in their Health and Wellbeing programme. Doughty also worked with The Prince's Trust mentoring children experiencing difficulties including bullying.
