= Crayford focuser =

Focusing mechanism for amateur telescopes

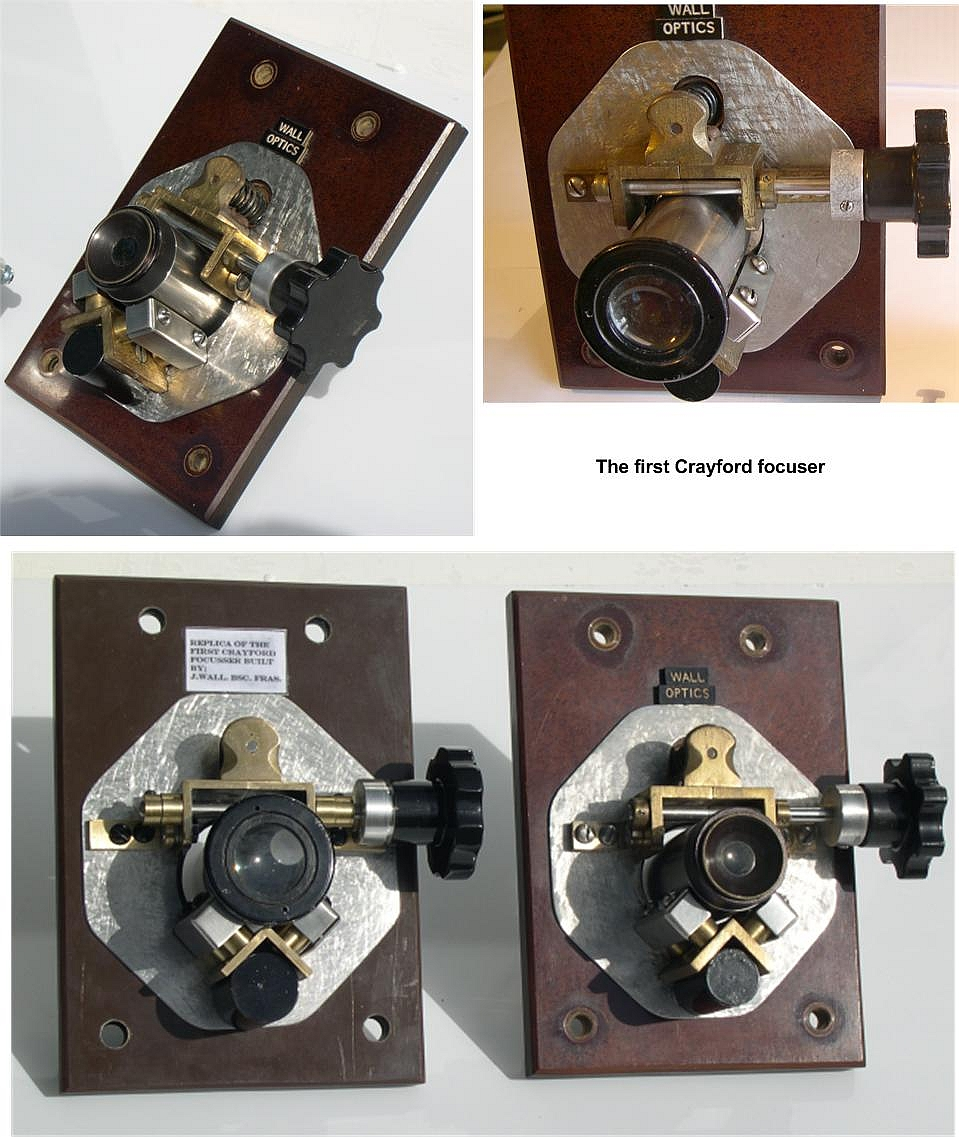
The first Crayford focuser (1968).

The Crayford focuser is a simplified focusing mechanism for amateur astronomical telescopes. Crayford focusers are considered superior to entry-level rack and pinion focusers, normally found in this type of device. Instead of the rack and pinion, they have a smooth spring-loaded shaft which holds the focus tube against four opposing bearing surfaces, and controls its movement. It is named after the Crayford Manor House Astronomical Society, Crayford, London, England, where it was invented by John Wall, a member of the astronomical society which meets there. The original Crayford Focuser is on display there.

The Crayford focuser was initially demonstrated to the Crayford Manor House Astronomical Society, and then descriptions were published in The Journal of the British Astronomical Association (February 1971), Model Engineer magazine (May 1972) (with full constructional plans), and Sky & Telescope magazine (September 1972). John Wall decided not to patent the idea, effectively donating it to the amateur astronomical community.

Crayfords began to be popular among amateur telescope makers for being easy to make without any high precision machining, yet providing precise focusing with no gear slop or backlash. This trend picked up steam as commercial Crayfords, while being relatively inexpensive, proved to be superior to most rack-and-pinion devices. They became the default focusing device on many amateur telescopes just above entry level, and better. They are made in a variety of designs by companies specializing in amateur telescope supplies, with such features as dual speed focusing and interface to motorized, or robotic, focusing.

== The concept ==
The Crayford focuser design is reminiscent of the Dobsonian design for telescopes, since instead of precision machining, it relies on geometry to preclude any wobble or backlash .

The Crayford is similar in appearance to a Rack and pinion focuser, but has no teeth on either the rack or the pinion. Instead, a round axle is pressed (for example by a spring-loaded or thumbscrew-tightened piece of PTFE plastic) against a flat on the side of the focuser drawtube, relying only on friction to move the drawtube as the axle is turned. This also presses the drawtube against a set of four ball bearings against which it moves smoothly with minimal friction. The pressure exerted on the axle can often be adjusted for smoothest operation, and the drawtube may be locked in position to support heavy eyepieces or cameras.

Subsequently, variations on the Crayford focuser concept have emerged, e.g. a helical Crayford where the drawtube is pressed against four tilted ball bearings, and focusing action is accomplished by rotating the drawtube.

== Crayford focuser Gallery ==
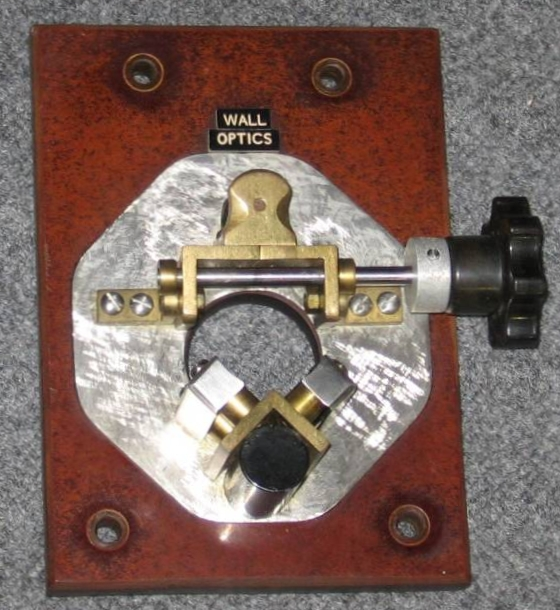
The first Crayford focuser - mechanical part.

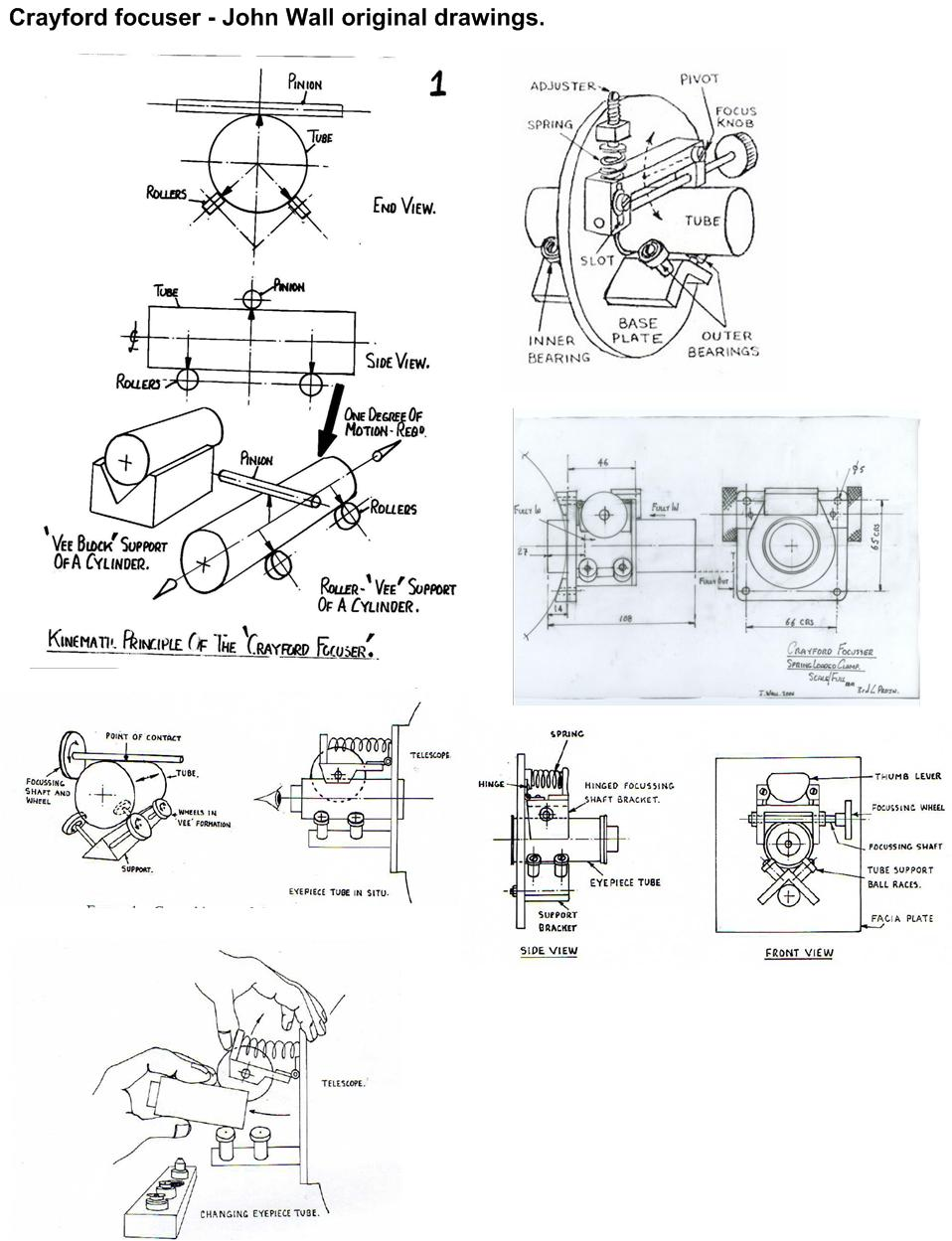
Crayford focuser - John Wall original drawings.

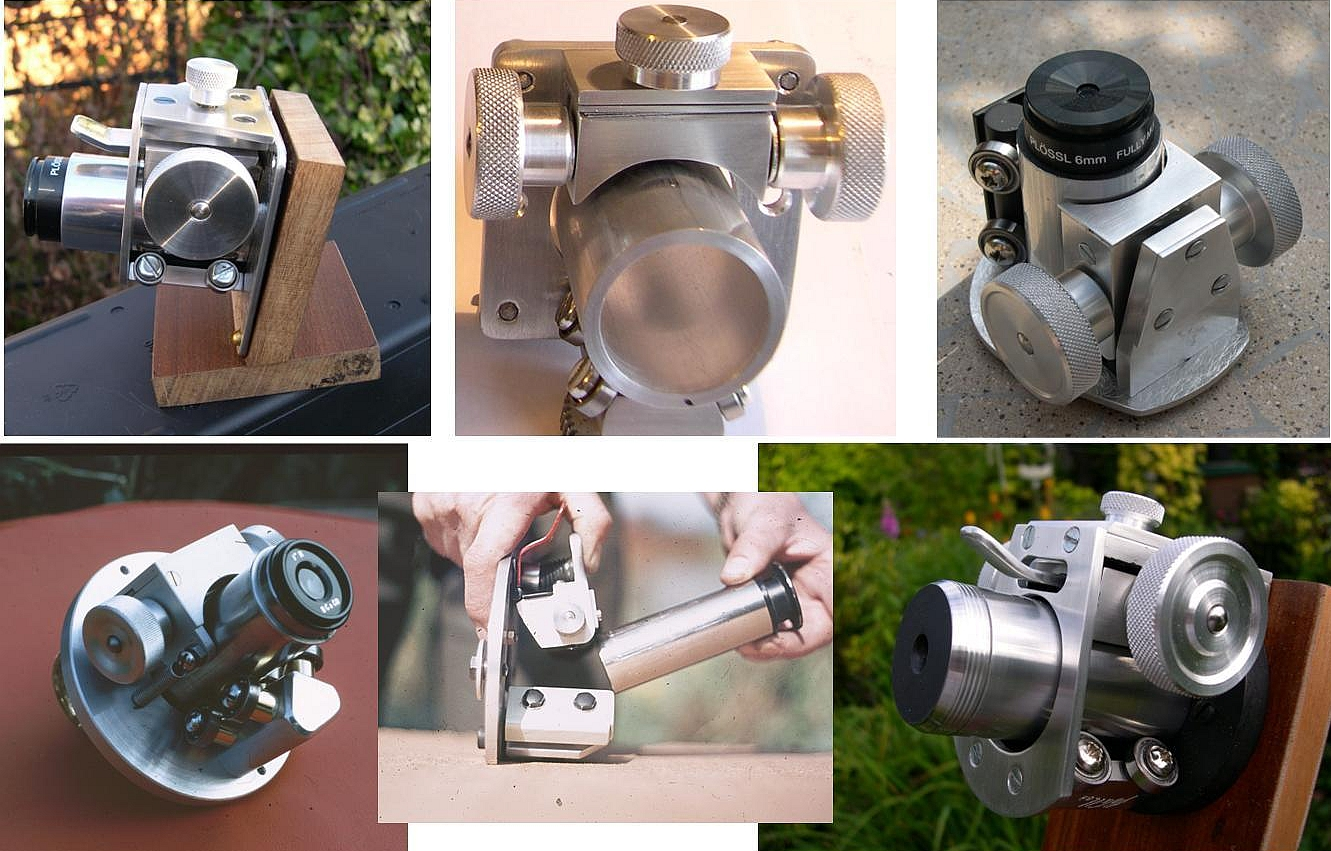
Crayford focusers.

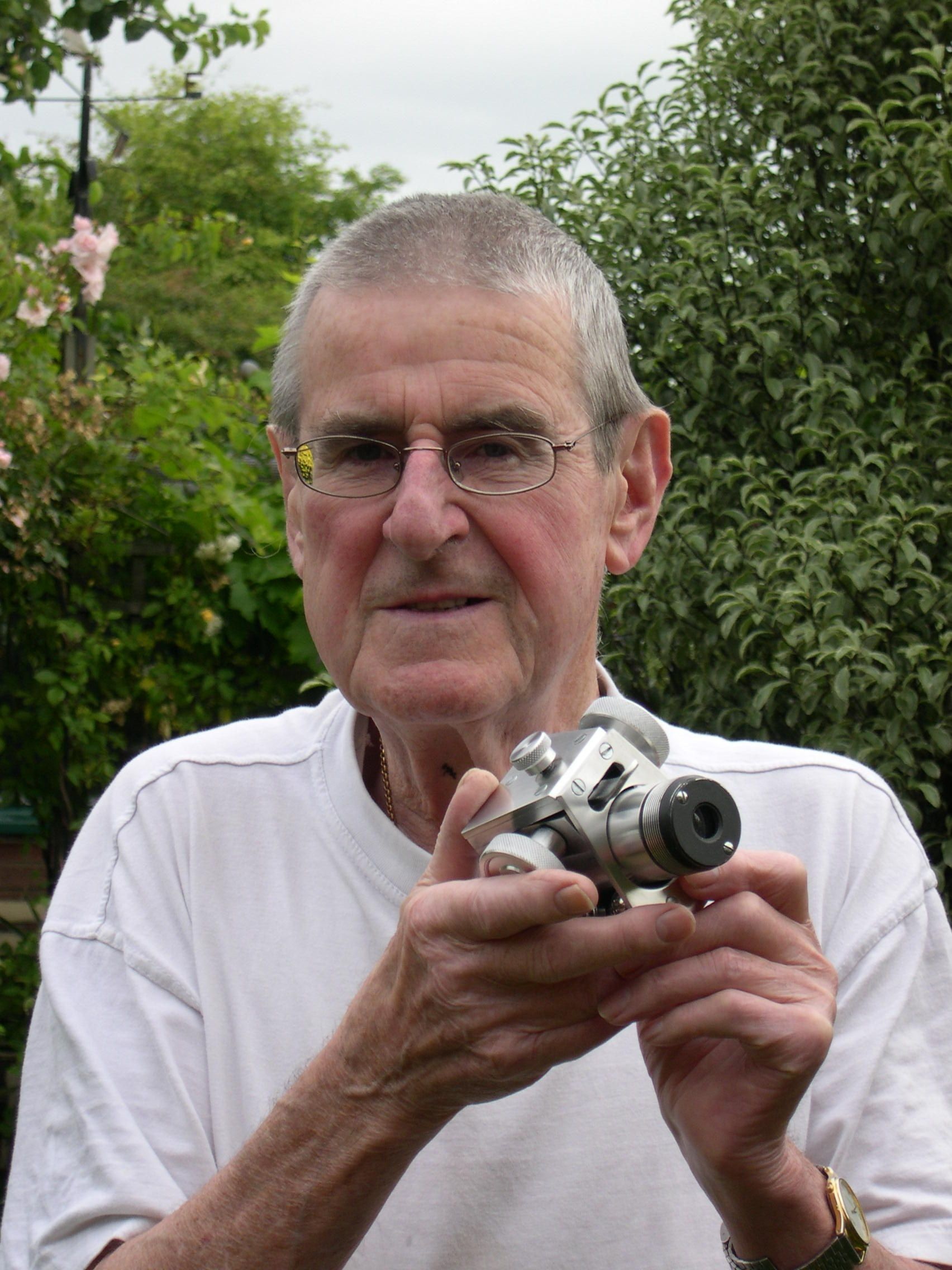
Mr. John Wall, inventor of the Crayford focuser.

Crayford focuser.

Commercial dual-speed Crayford
