= Goerz (company) =

Historical German company for photographic lenses and cameras

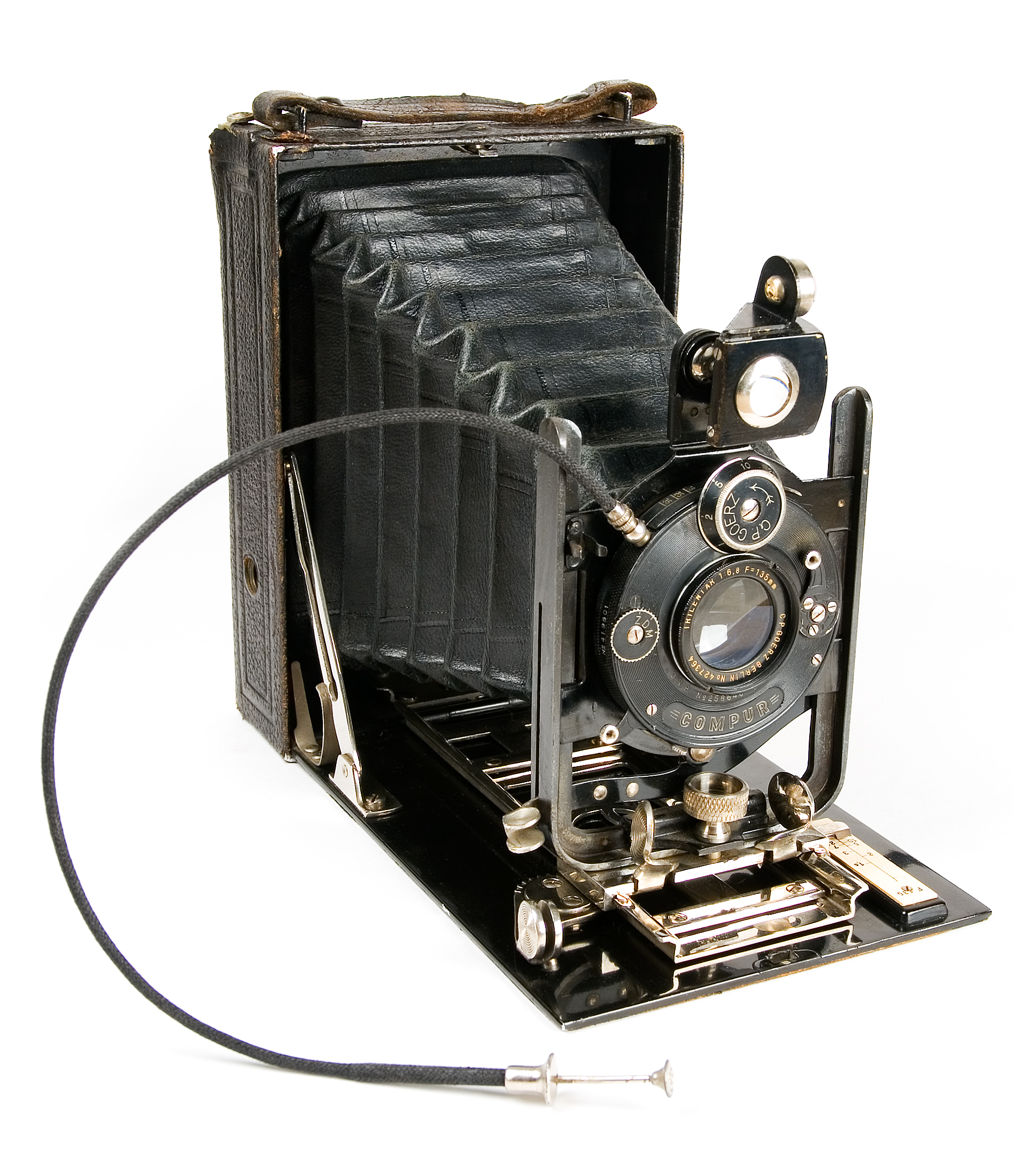
C. P. Goerz Taro-Tenax 9x12

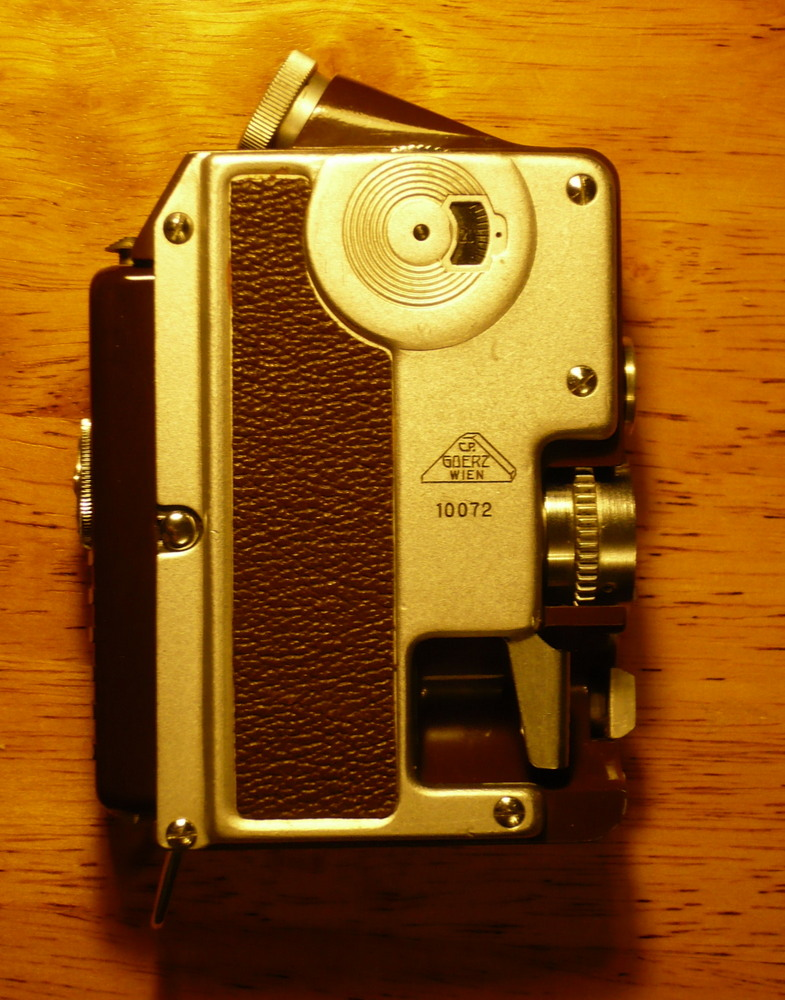
C. P. Goerz Wien Minicord III

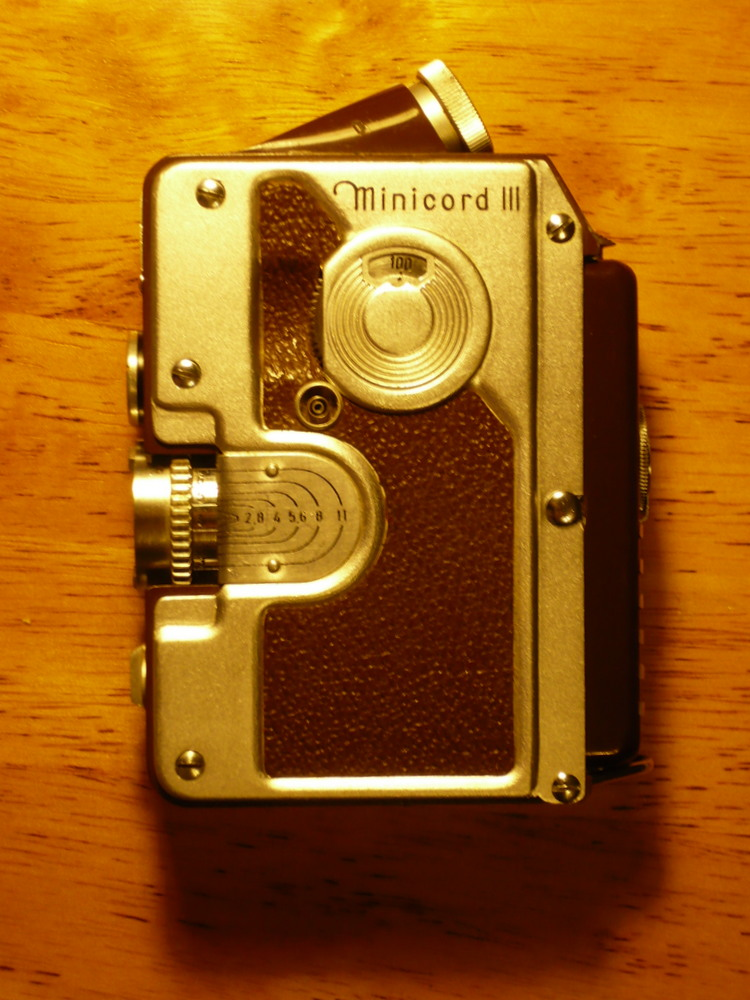
Goerz Minicord III twin lens reflex 16 mm film camera

C. P. Goerz was founded in 1886 by Carl Paul Goerz. Originally, it made geometrical drawing instruments for schools. From 1888 it made cameras and photographic lenses. During the First World War, Goerz's main production was for the German and Austrian military. Goerz is known primarily for Anschütz strut-folding cameras, Dagor and Tengor lenses, Tenax cameras (later continued by Zeiss Ikon) and Minicord subminiature cameras. C. P. Goerz also made a series of telescopic sights for sporting rifles that saw some use during the shortage of military sniping rifles experienced during the early stages of the trench warfare that was to characterise much of the First World War.

In 1895 Goerz founded a branch in New York that was to become the C. P. Goerz American Optical Company in 1905. This company continued to operate independently in the USA until 1972.

In 1908, Goerz Photochemisches Werk GmbH was founded in Zehlendorf, Berlin. This company produced roll film and film for the movie industry.

In 1926 the German branch of Goerz merged with ICA, Contessa-Nettel and Ernemann to form Zeiss Ikon. This had major consequences for the company. The Carl Zeiss company held a majority stake in the new company and demanded that the other firms end their lens production. Thus the European Dagor lenses were made by Carl Zeiss Jena in limited number. The American branch was an independent company and was therefore able to continue production in America.
