= Icarex =

Line of 35mm SLR cameras by Zeiss Ikon

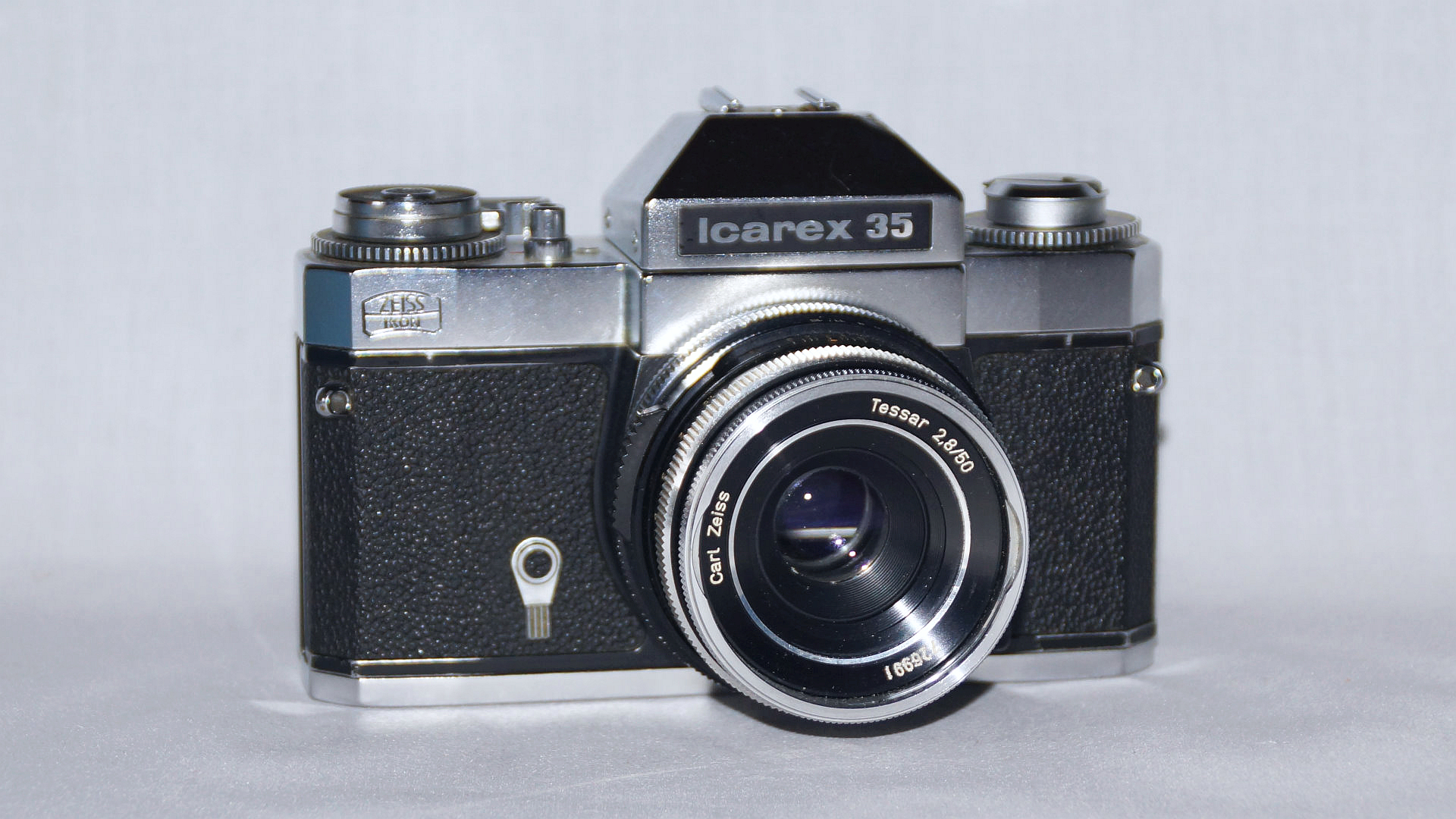
- Icarex 35 (bayonet) with eye-level finder and Tessar 50 mm f/2.8 lens

Overview
- Type: 35mm SLR camera

Lens
- Lens mount: M42 or Icarex bayonet

Sensor/medium
- Film format: 135 film, 24×36 mm

Focusing
- Focus: manual

Exposure/metering
- Exposure: manual

Icarex is a line of 35mm single lens reflex cameras (SLRs) made by Zeiss Ikon, derived from an earlier Bessaflex project developed by Voigtländer. The Icarex line, which included the Icarex 35, Icarex 35CS, Icarex 35S, and SL 706, was aimed at a mid-range market above the Contaflex SLR, which was intended for advanced amateurs, but below the Contarex line for professionals.

Icarex SLRs were manufactured from 1966 until Zeiss Ikon ceased camera production in 1972; the Voigtländer marque and associated designs were sold to Rollei, who would later rebrand the last of the Icarex line, the Zeiss Ikon SL 706 (1971–72), and fit it with their QBM lens mount as the Rolleiflex SL35 M, released in 1976.

== Cameras ==
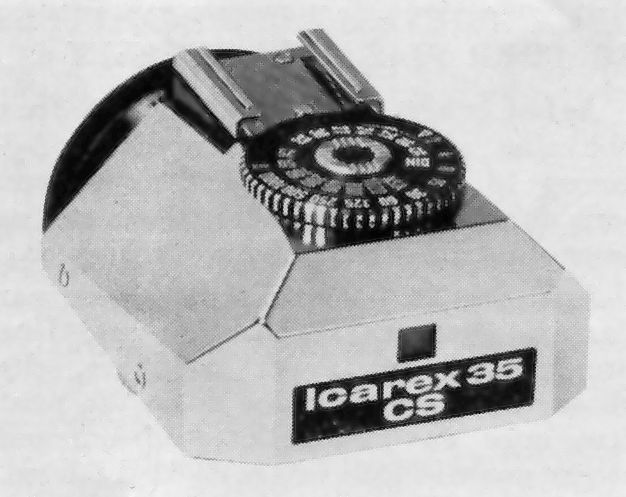
'CS' uncoupled eye-level pentaprism viewfinder with through-the-lens metering; shutter speeds must be transferred manually from the finder to the body.

Carl Zeiss AG previously had purchased a minority stake in Voigtländer in the 1940s and acquired the remainder of the company in 1956; Voigtländer released the Bessamatic/Ultramatic line of SLRs with leaf shutters and DKL-mount interchangeable lenses in the early 1960s, in direct competition with the Contaflex line. Voigtländer next developed a Bessaflex SLR prototype with a focal plane shutter by 1963 as a replacement for the Bessamatic/Ultramatic, but further development was paused as it would have competed in the same market segment against the existing Contaflex SLR line. However, faced with competition both at the high end for its Contarex line, and at the low end for the Contaflex, Zeiss Ikon decided to bring the Bessaflex project to market in 1966 as the Icarex 35. The release of the Icarex 35 in 1966 demonstrated the Voigtländer unit had been integrated completely into Zeiss Ikon. The Icarex 35 had significant disadvantages compared to the competition at launch; there were no fast normal lenses, and neither of the two viewfinders (an eye-level pentaprism or folding waist-level finder) had an internal light meter.

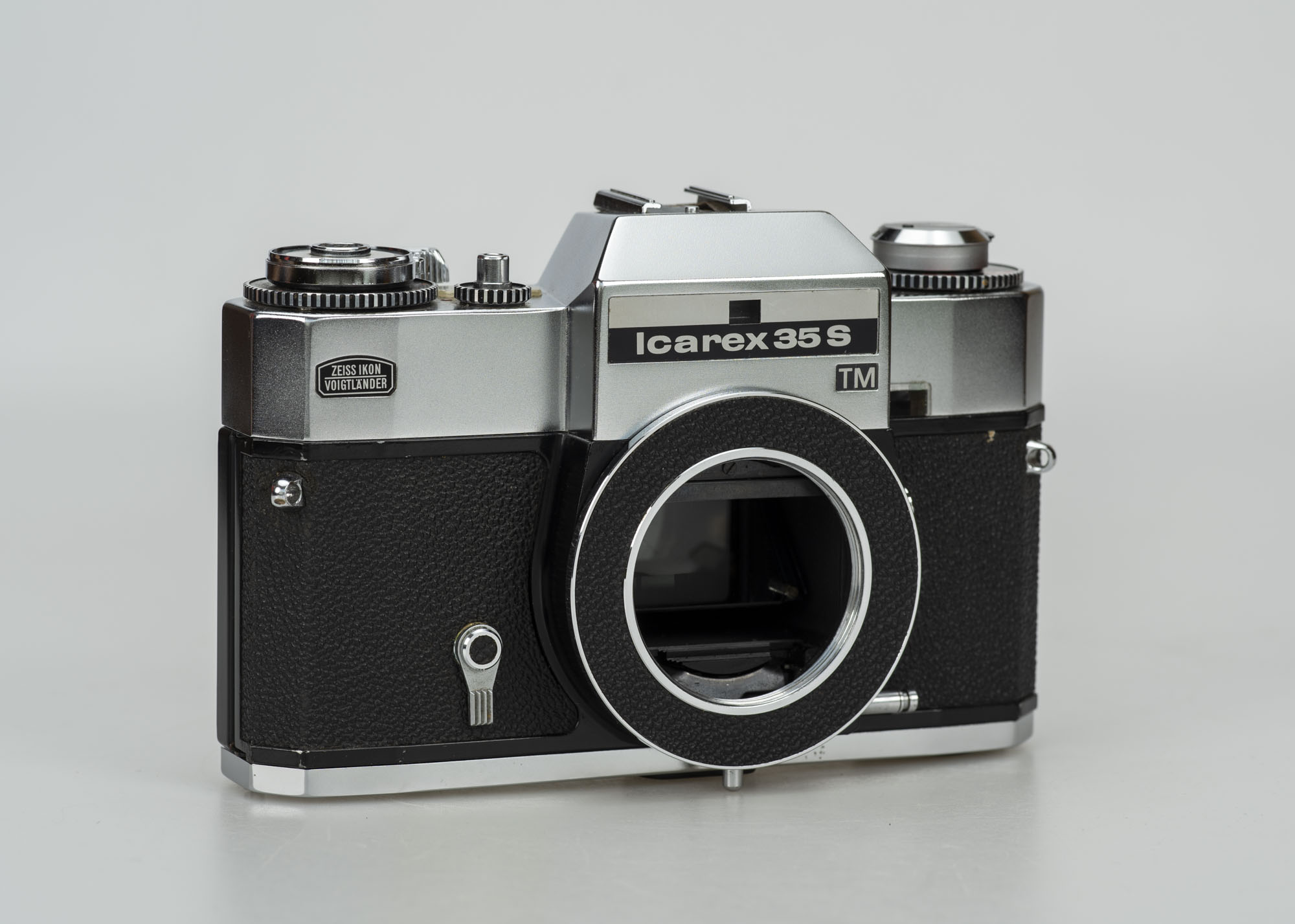
Icarex 35S TM

These were remedied in 1968 by the release of a fast f/1.8 Ultron lens, designed by Albrecht Tronnier, Joachim Eggert, and Fritz Uberhagen, and an uncoupled through-the-lens (TTL) metering eye-level pentaprism, which also was offered and sold bundled with the camera as the Icarex 35CS. However, the operation of the uncoupled 35CS prism was awkward, requiring the photographer to transfer shutter speeds manually, and so the 35 and 35CS were supplemented by the Icarex 35S in 1970, which switched to a fixed, eye-level viewfinder with a coupled TTL meter, although metering with the 35S still had to be performed with the lens stopped down. That year, both the 35 and the 35S added M42 mount variants, giving four distinct SLR models in total. Finally, in 1971, an enhanced version of the 35S with the M42 mount was released as the SL 706, which added full-aperture metering.

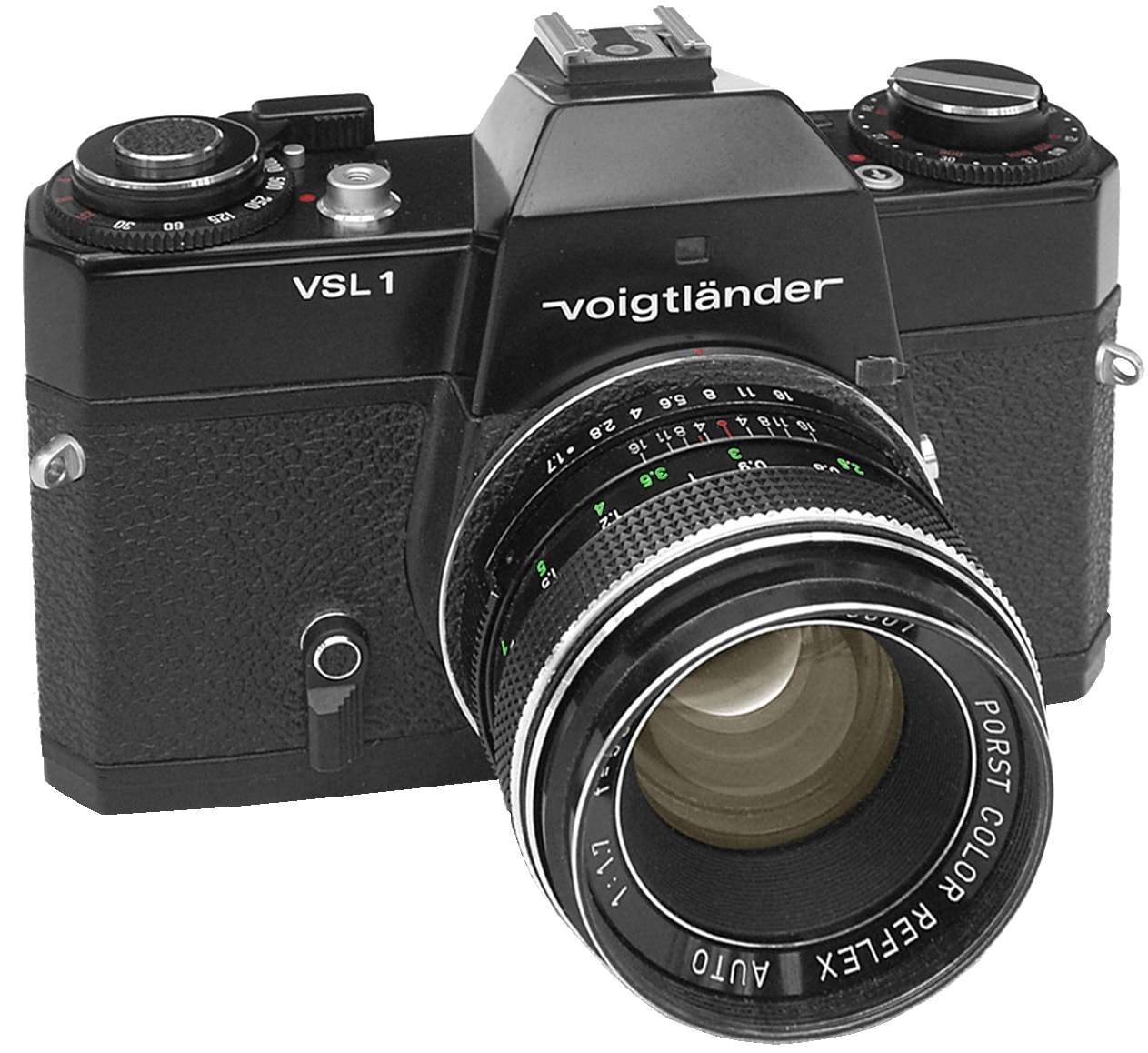
Voigtländer VSL 1 (TM) continued the SL 706 design with minor cosmetic updates

However, Zeiss Ikon stopped production of all cameras by 1972, discontinuing the entire Icarex line, including the SL 706; relatively few examples of the SL 706 were sold. The Voigtländer brand and SL 706 design were acquired by Rollei, which moved production to Singapore and first sold it with few changes as the Voigtländer VSL 1 starting from 1974, then later adapted it for its SL35 line as the SL35 M, released in 1976.

An unrelated Icarex 126 SLR was developed for the 126 film (Instamatic) cartridge developed by Kodak, but it was produced and sold as the Contaflex 126 starting from 1967. Contaflex 126 lenses are not physically compatible with either Icarex lens mount.

Icarex cameras
Name	Catalog		Years	Shutter speeds		Battery	Notes / Refs.
Name	Bayonet	Thread	Years	Range	X-Sync	Battery	Notes / Refs.
35	(10.2000) no finder	(10.3500)	1966–72	1/2–1/1000s + B	1/60s	PX 13 / PX 625	
35	(10.2100) waist level	(10.3500)	1966–72	1/2–1/1000s + B	1/60s	PX 13 / PX 625	
35	(10.2200) pentaprism	(10.3500)	1966–72	1/2–1/1000s + B	1/60s	PX 13 / PX 625	
35	(10.2300) 'CS' TTL	(10.3500)	1966–72	1/2–1/1000s + B	1/60s	PX 13 / PX 625	
35S	(10.3300)	(10.3600)	1969–72	1/2–1/1000s + B	1/60s	PX 13 / PX 625	
SL 706	—	(10.3700)	1971–72	1/2–1/1000s + B	1/60s	PX 13 / PX 625	

== Lenses ==
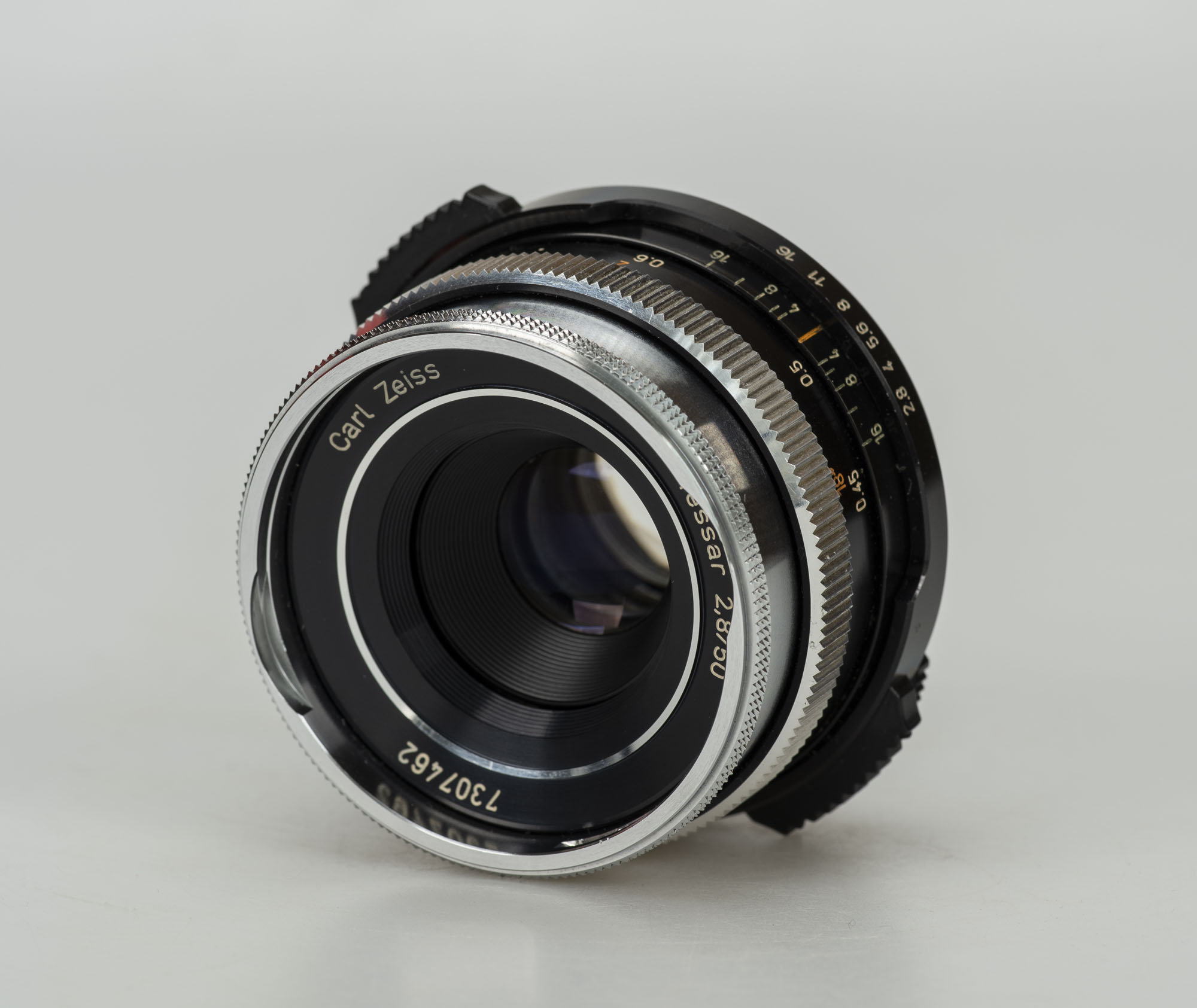
Carl Zeiss Tessar 50 mm f/2.8 normal lens for Icarex BM

The first Icarex 35 SLRs were available with a proprietary "ZIV" (Zeiss Ikon Voigtländer) two-lug breech-lock bayonet lens mount and a version with the M42 lens mount was added in 1969; bayonet mount cameras are either unmarked or carry a "BM", while thread mount cameras are marked "TM". In addition to the lenses sold by Zeiss Ikon for the Icarex listed, Soligor marketed some of their lenses with Icarex BM/ZIV mount.

Interchangeable lenses for Icarex
FL (mm)	Aperture	Lens			Construction		Notes / Refs.
FL (mm)	Aperture	Name	Cat (BM)	Cat (TM)	Ele	Grp	Notes / Refs.
Wide angle lenses
25	f/4	Distagon	—	11.3503	7	?	
35	f/3.4	Skoparex	11.2003	11.3510	6	5	
Normal lenses
50	f/1.8	Ultron	11.2014	11.3502	7	6	
50	f/2.8	Color-Pantar	11.2001	—	3	3	
50	f/2.8	Tessar	11.2002	UNK	4	3	
Portrait lenses
90	f/3.4	Dynarex	11.2004	—	5	3	
135	f/4	Super-Dynarex	11.2005	11.3511	4	3	
Telephoto lenses
200	f/4	Super-Dynarex	11.2008	—	5	4	
400	f/5	Telomar	11.2010	—	3	2	
Zoom lenses
36~82	f/2.8	Zoomar	11.2012	—	14	11	
