= Voigtländer Bessamatic and Ultramatic =

35mm SLR camera

Bessamatic
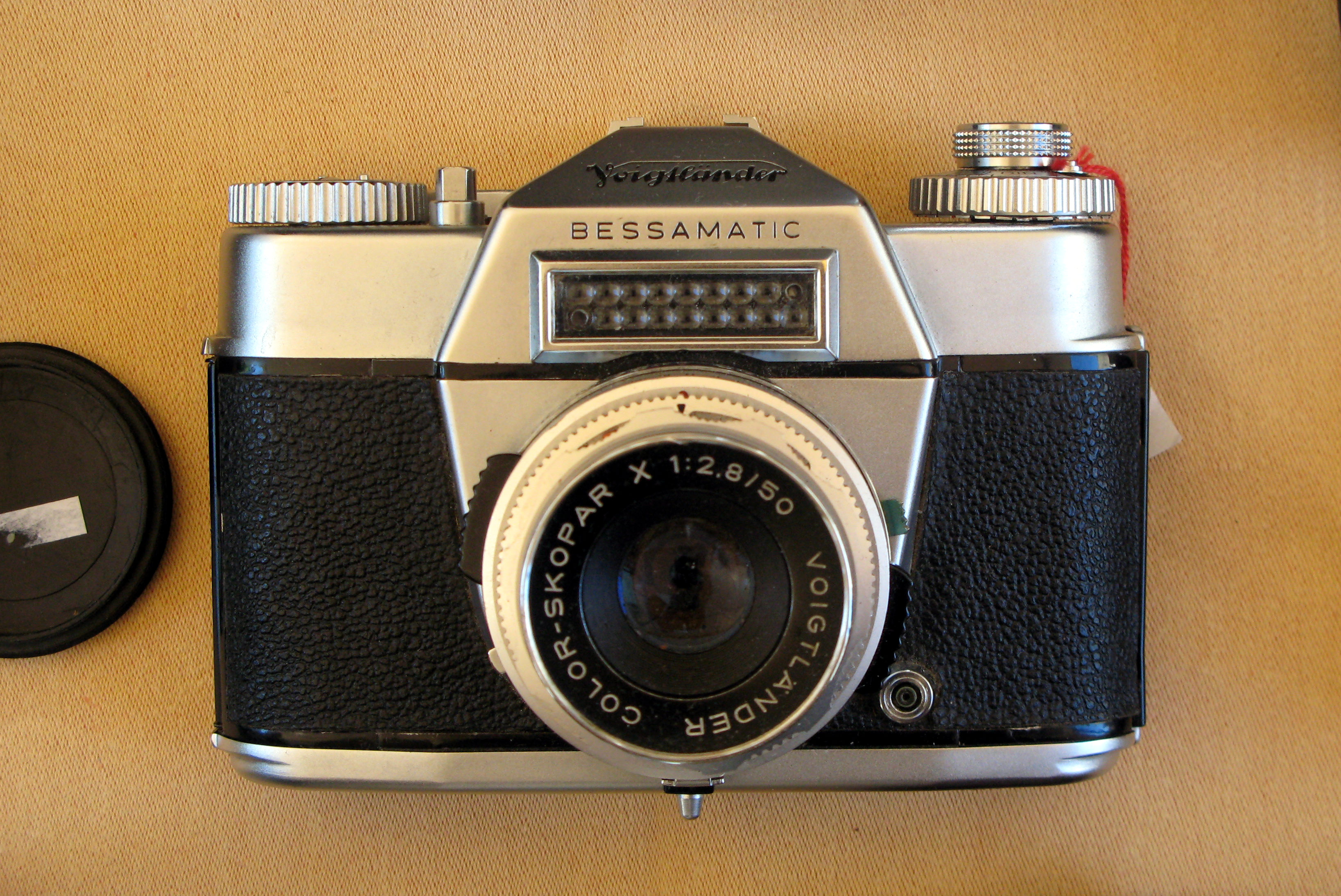
- Bessamatic with Color-Skopar X 50 mm f/2.8 lens (Tessar-type)

Overview
- Maker: Voigtländer
- Type: 35mm SLR camera

Lens
- Lens mount: DKL-mount

Focusing
- Focus: manual

Exposure/metering
- Exposure: manual

Shutter
- Shutter: Synchro-Compur leaf
- Shutter speeds: 1–1/500 + B, X/M

The Bessamatic and Ultramatic were lines of 35mm SLR cameras made by Voigtländer in the 1960s, featuring a selenium meter. It uses a leaf shutter, similar to competing SLR cameras manufactured by Kodak (Retina Reflex) and Zeiss Ikon (Contaflex SLR) in Germany, rather than the focal plane shutter almost universally adopted by Japanese SLRs such as the contemporary Nikon F and Pentax Spotmatic. The Ultramatic was released in 1963, which used the same lens mount and added a shutter-priority autoexposure mode.

== Design ==
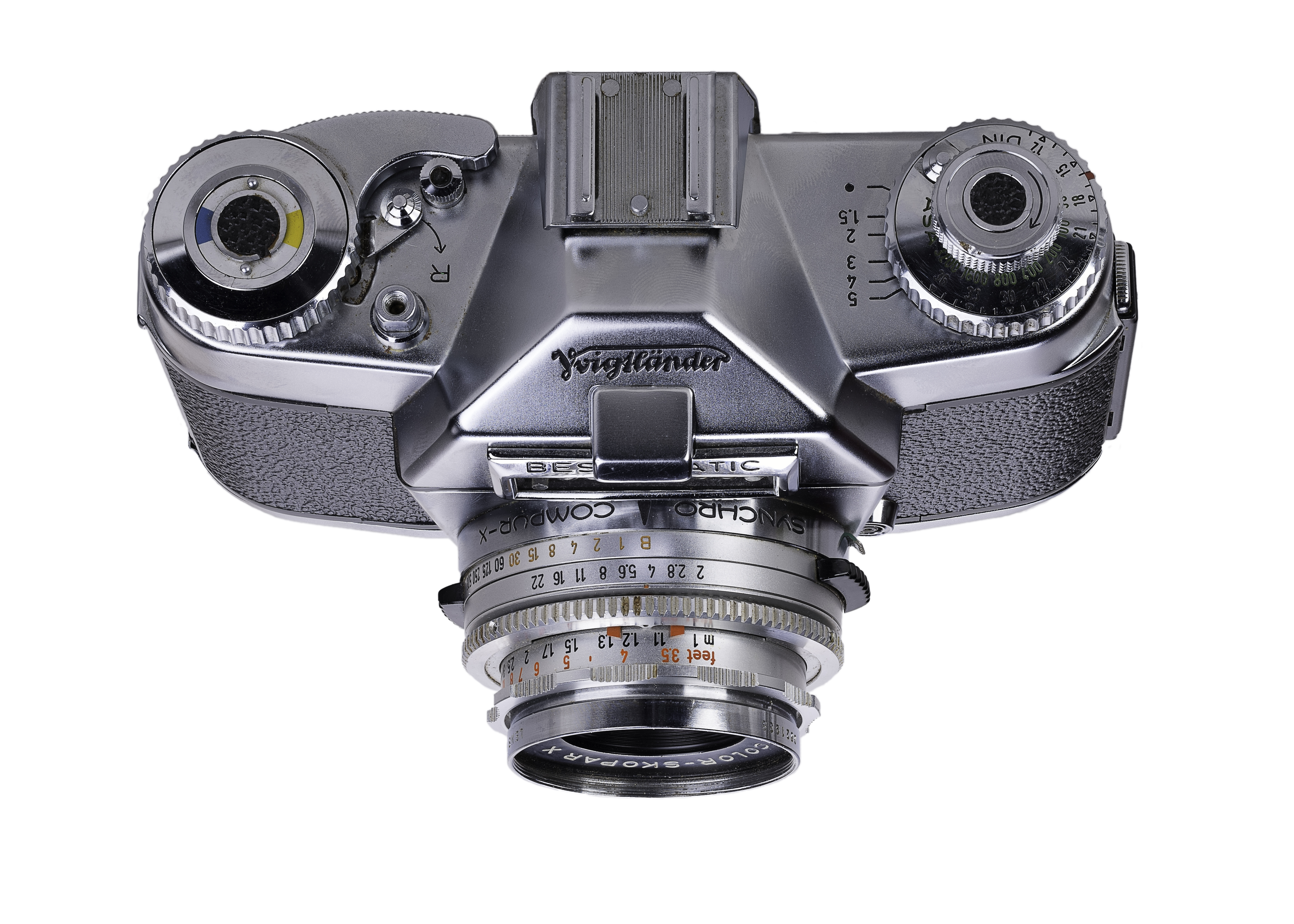
Top view of Bessamatic Deluxe camera with Color-Skopar X lens

The leaf shutter is a Synchro-Compur unit mounted behind the interchangeable lens, which uses the DKL-mount, although lenses made for the Bessamatic are not generally compatible with other DKL-mount cameras, and the Bessamatic DKL-mount will not generally accept non-Voigtländer lenses without physical modifications. The shutter speed settings range from 1 to 1/500 sec plus "B"ulb.

As implemented, leaf shutter SLRs have two separate sets of blades: one to control the exposure time, and another to control the aperture. Because the shutter and aperture are held wide open while the photograph is being composed, there is a complicated sequence of operations required once the shutter release button is pressed:

1. Shutter is closed and aperture is stopped down
2. Mirror (and capping plate) are raised
3. Shutter is opened to expose the film
4. Shutter is closed to end the exposure, aperture returns to wide open
  This introduces an unavoidable shutter lag of approximately 1/50 sec. Then, as the film is wound on to the next frame, additional operations follow to make the camera ready for the next composition and exposure:
5. Mirror (and capping plate) are lowered
6. Shutter is cocked and opened

The Bessamatic has a reputation as a tricky camera to repair, although if looked after it can be reliable and pleasant to use. It is certainly worth seeking out someone familiar with this model for servicing and repair, as the reputation is not totally unfounded. The mechanism is very precisely made with many small components and can be damaged if any of the controls are forced. This can easily turn a minor repair into a camera fit only for spare parts.

=== Models ===
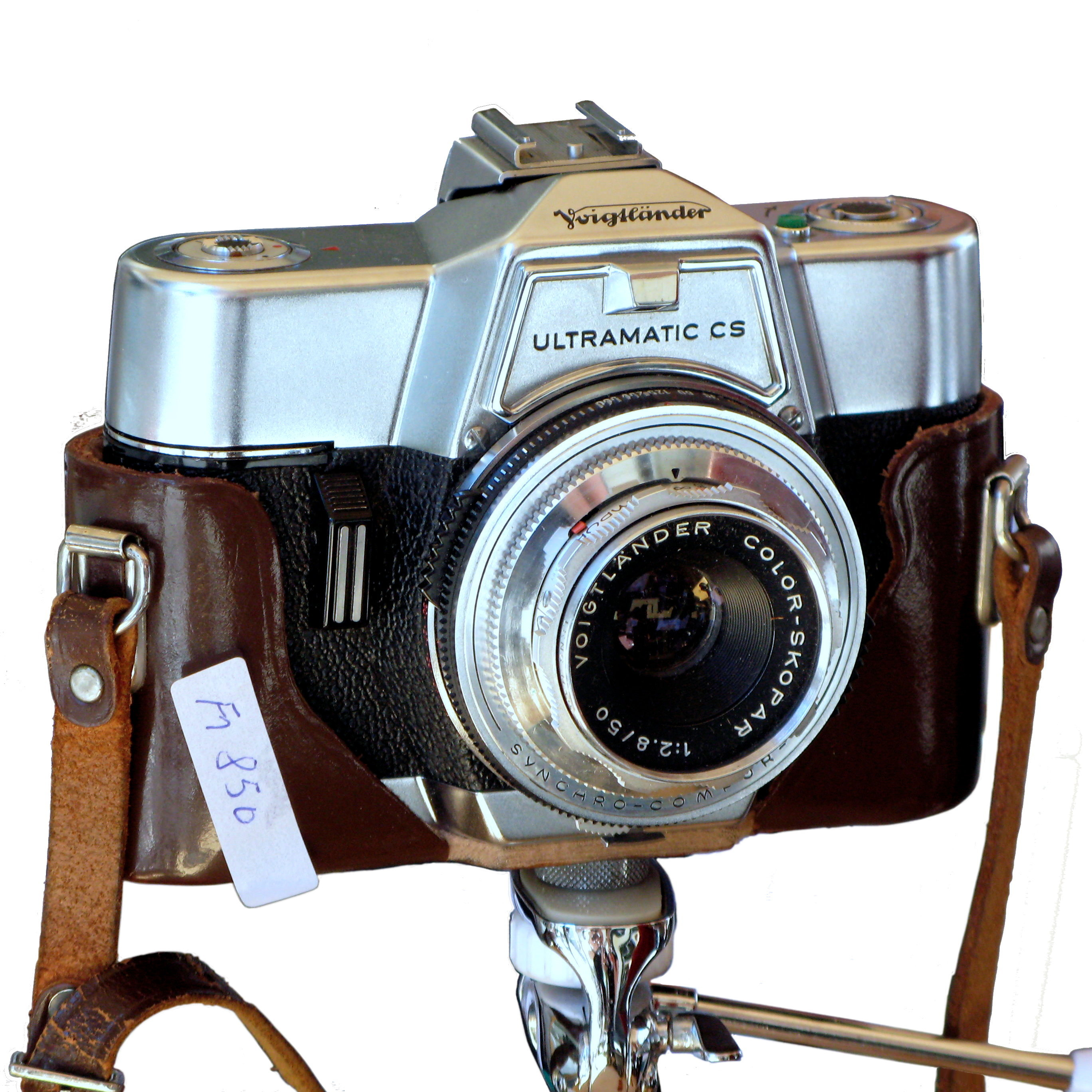
Voigtländer Ultramatic CS

Zeiss Ikon purchased a stake in Voigtländer in the 1940s, and acquired the remainder in 1956, but Voigtländer continued to operate as an autonomous unit. The original Bessamatic was released in 1958, in direct competition with the Zeiss Ikon Contaflex SLR, which also was a leaf shutter SLR made in Germany with interchangeable lenses. In comparison to the Contaflex, the Bessamatic offered a more convenient, fully-coupled exposure meter, although the Bessamatic did not have an instant-return mirror; the mirror instead was dropped into viewing position when the film was wound. The Bessamatic also used the DKL bayonet lens mount introduced in 1956 with the Voigtländer Vitessa T rangefinder camera, with some physical differences that left the systems mutually incompatible.

In 1962/63, Voigtländer released the Bessamatic Deluxe and Ultramatic. The Deluxe added a small periscope to relay aperture and shutter speed settings into the viewfinder. The Ultramatic included those displays and added a shutter-priority autoexposure mode; the camera could automatically select the aperture based on the photographer's selection of a shutter speed. In addition, the Ultramatic had a rapid-return mirror, meaning the mirror automatically reset to its lowered position after the exposure, without requiring the film to be wound on, as implemented with the Bessamatic models.

The Bessamatic m was an entry-level model introduced in 1964 which has no meter at all, and is uncommon today. The m typically was bundled with a three-element Color-Lanthar lens to reduce costs; although the Color-Lanthar is less common than the Color-Skopar and usually more expensive now, the Tessar-derived Skopar is a superior lens.

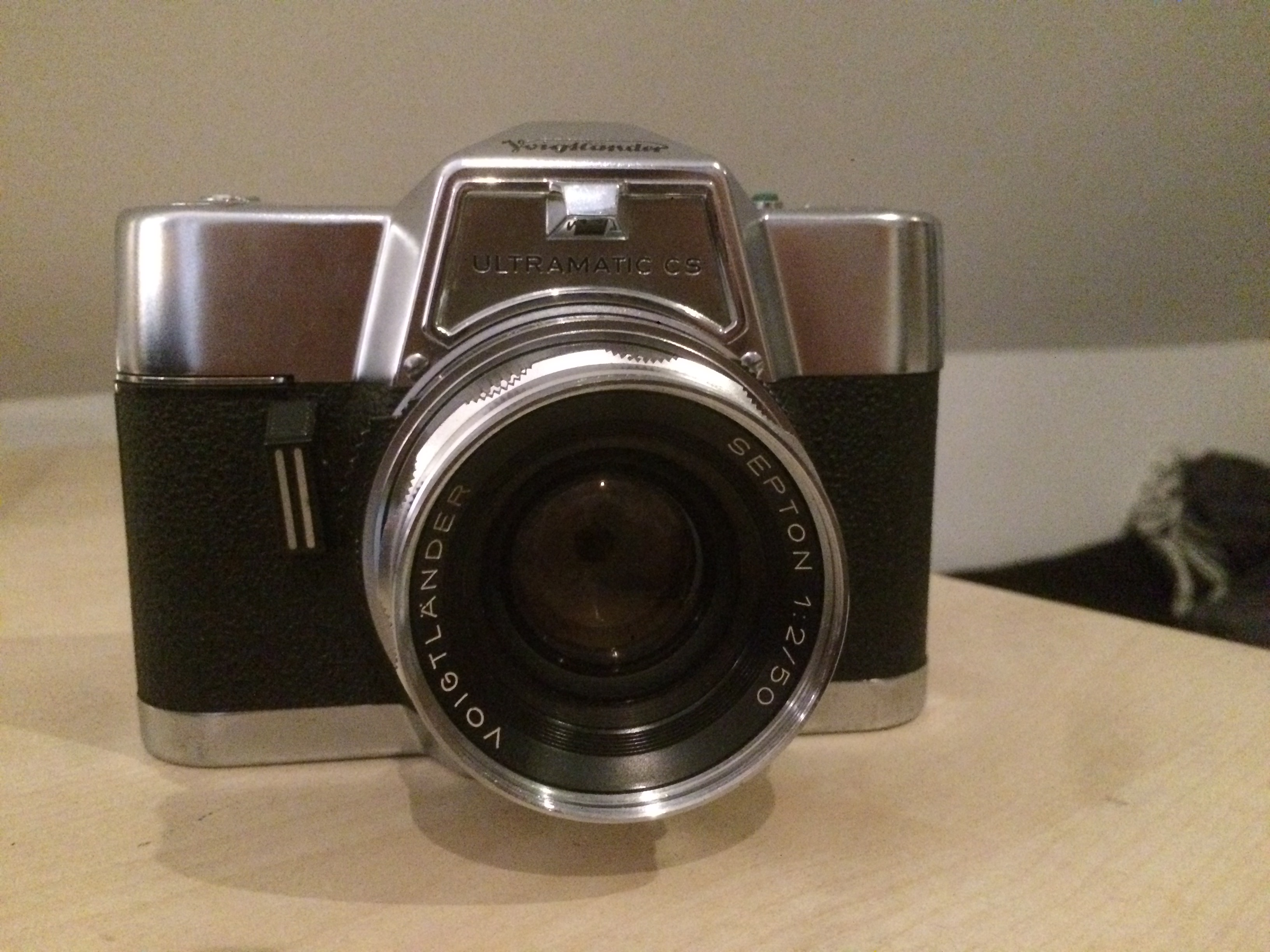
Ultramatic CS with Septon 50 mm f/2 lens

Voigtländer introduced the Ultramatic CS in 1965, updating the meter from an external selenium cell to a coupled, TTL light meter using a CdS photoresistor, retaining the shutter-priority autoexposure mode and the shutter speed and aperture periscope from the original Ultramatic, being one of the first TTL metering SLRs to have both settings displayed. The rapid return mirror was dropped from the prior Ultramatic, though, as that camera proved to be vulnerable to a jammed shutter, and the Ultramatic CS generally is regarded as a more reliable model.

By 1963, Voigtländer's chief designer, Walter Swarofsky, had developed the Bessaflex as a potential successor to the Bessamatic/Ultramatic line, using a proprietary bayonet lens mount and a focal plane shutter. However, the project was shelved as Voigtländer's parent, Zeiss Ikon, already was selling three mutually incompatible SLR systems (the Contaflex SLR, Contarex, and Bessamatic/Ultramatic). The Bessaflex project eventually was revived and released as the Zeiss Ikon/Voigtländer Icarex 35 in 1966.

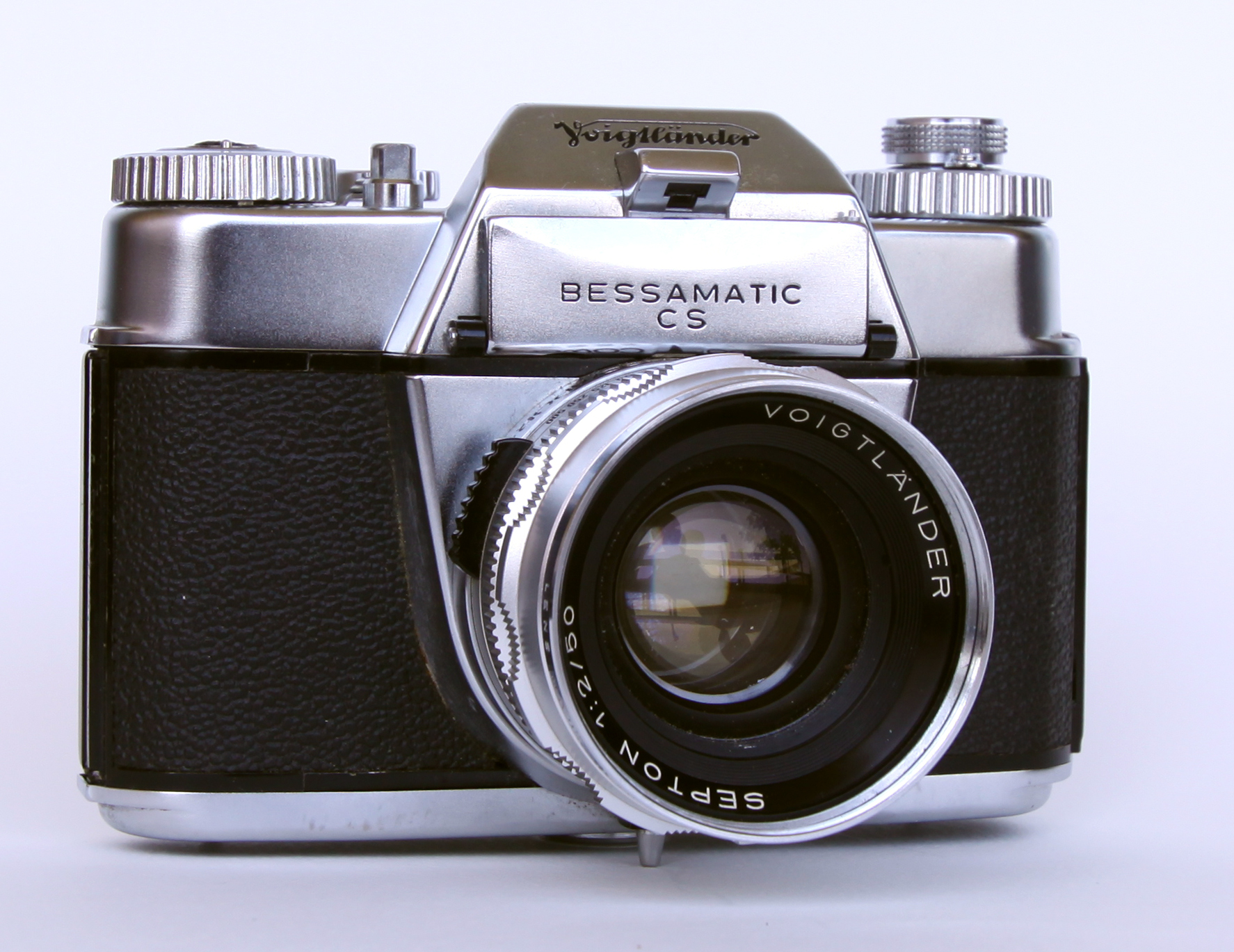
Bessamatic CS with Septon 50 mm f/2 lens

After the Icarex was released, Voigtländer also gave the Bessamatic the same CdS TTL meter as the Ultramatic CS, releasing the Bessamatic CS in 1967. The Bessamatic CS is typically fitted with a Color-Lanthar 50 mm f/2.8 lens. The Bessamatic CS is relatively uncommon, as the Bessamatic and Ultramatic lines were supplemented and ultimately replaced by the Icarex, and Zeiss Ikon/Voigtländer wound down production of the older leaf shutter -matic SLR lines by 1969.

== Lenses ==
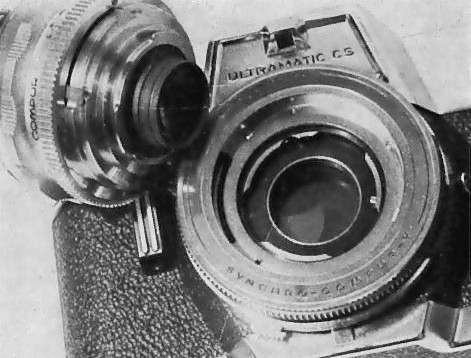
Ultramatic CS with lens removed, displaying the behind-lens Compur leaf shutter

Although the Bessamatic and Ultramatic share the same DKL-mount with the preceding Vitessa T, there are physical differences that make Vitessa T lenses incompatible with the Bessamatic and vice versa. For instance, lenses for the Vitessa T include an aperture control ring on the lens, while the aperture control ring is fixed to the camera on the Bessamatic and Ultramatic. Other differences to the mounting lugs make the Bessamatic lenses incompatible with other DKL-mount cameras. Within the line of Voigtländer lenses, an additional physical coupling is required for autoexposure with the Ultramatics; lenses so equipped are marked with a yellow dot on the rear flange.

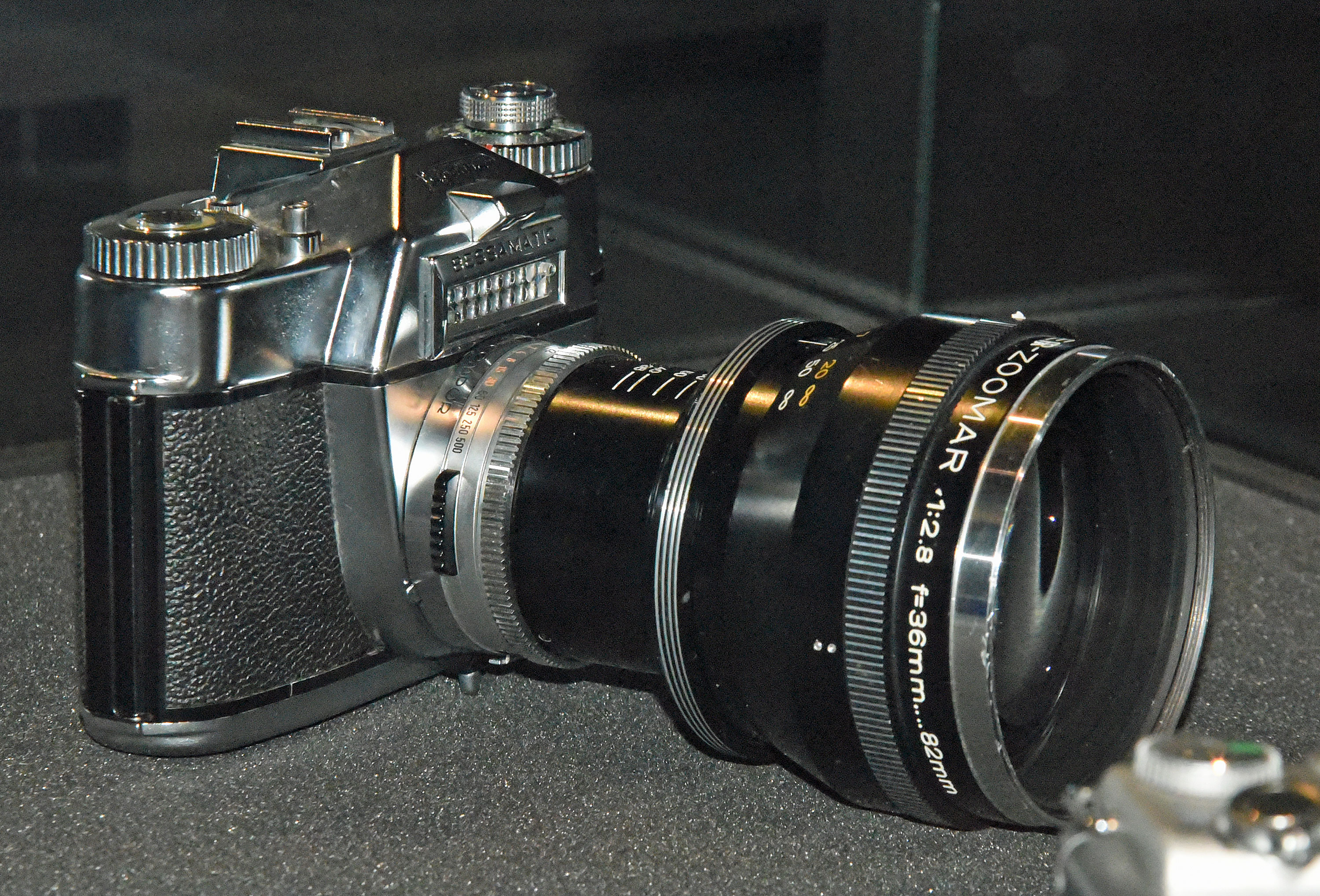
Bessamatic Deluxe with Zoomar lens

The interchangeable lenses for the Bessamatic / Ultramatic are highly regarded. The most common lenses found on the Bessamatic are the Color-Lanthar, Color-Skopar, and Color-Skopar X, all of which are 50 mm focal length with a maximum aperture of f/2.8. As an alternative, the faster Septon, 50 mm f/2, is also sometimes fitted to these cameras, and is highly prized.

The 35mm Skoparex is unusual, but not hard to find.

The 135mm f/4 Super-Dynarex is relatively common, although the longer 200mm and 350mm Super-Dynarex telephoto lenses are relatively rare and expensive.

The Bessamatic was the first SLR to be fitted with a zoom lens, the Zoomar. This is a highly sought after collectible and is quite expensive.

Voigtländer Bessamatic/Ultramatic SLR DKL-mount lenses
Name	FL (mm)	Aperture	Construction		Intro.	Notes
Name	FL (mm)	Aperture	Ele	Grp	Intro.	Notes
Wide angle lenses
Skoparex	35	f/3.4	6	5	1958	(I: 0.9/1m or 3 ft; II: 0.9/1m and 3 ft; III: 0.9/1m and 3 ft + bigger ring; IV: 0.4m and 1.5 ft + bigger ring)
Normal lenses
Skopagon	40	f/2.0	9	6	1961	(I: 0.9m or 3 ft; II: 0.9m and 3 ft; III: 0.5m and 2 ft)
Color-Skopar X	50	f/2.8	4	3	1958	(I: 0.9/1m or 3 ft; II: 0.9/1m and 3 ft; III: 0.9/1m and 3 ft + bigger ring; IV: 0.6m and 2 ft + bigger ring)
Color-Skopar	50	f/2.8	4	3	1965	(0.6m and 2 ft + bigger ring; since ca. 1965)
Color-Lanthar	50	f/2.8	3	3	1964	(for Bessamatic m)
Septon	50	f/2.0	7	5	1960	(I: 0.9m or 3 ft; II: 0.9m and 3 ft; III: 0.6m and 2 ft)
Portrait lenses
Dynarex	90	f/3.4	5	4	1960	
Dynarex	100	f/4.8	6	4	1960	
Super-Dynarex	135	f/4.0	4	3	1958	(I: 4m or 13 ft; II: 4m and 13 ft)
Telephoto lenses
Super-Dynarex	200	f/4.0	5	4	1962	
Super-Dynarex	350	f/5.6	7	6	1964	
Zoom lenses
Zoomar	36–82	f/2.8	14	11	1959	

Originally, the lenses were labelled with either metric or imperial distance scales (type I). Later versions featured both (type II and higher). Some later types also had a thicker ring. Some of the lenses had better close focusing capabilities in late types. Lenses produced after 1959 are marked with yellow paint on a screw head attaching the lens flange, indicating the presence of a special cutout to transfer a lens's maximum aperture (2, 2.8, 3.4, or 4 and higher) for use with the Ultramatic and Ultramatic CS.

List of Carl Zeiss Bessamatic/Ultramatic SLR DKL-mount lenses:

- Carl Zeiss Planar 50mm f2.0 (prototype only)
- Carl Zeiss Tessar 50mm f2.8 (prototype only)
