= Contaflex SLR =

Family of 35mm SLR cameras

Contaflex
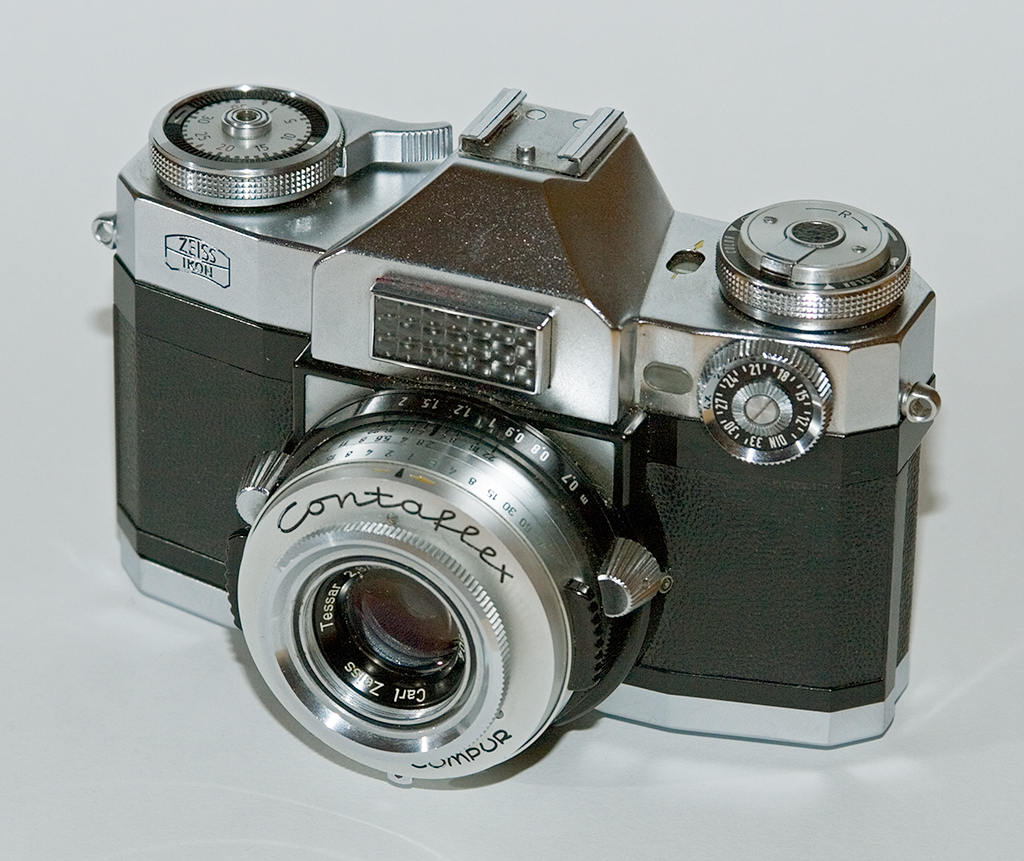
- Zeiss Ikon Contaflex Super (old style), 1959–63

Overview
- Maker: Zeiss Ikon
- Type: 35mm SLR camera

Lens
- Lens mount: varies by model

Focusing
- Focus: manual

Exposure/metering
- Exposure: manual

Flash
- Flash: cold shoe

Shutter
- Shutter: Compur leaf
- Shutter speeds: 1–1/500 + B, X/M

The Contaflex series is a family of 35mm Single-lens reflex cameras (SLR) equipped with a leaf shutter, produced by Zeiss Ikon in the 1950s and 1960s. The name was first used by Zeiss Ikon in 1935 for a 35mm Twin-lens reflex camera, the Contaflex TLR; for the earlier TLR, the -flex suffix referred to the integral reflex mirror for the viewfinder. The first SLR models, the Contaflex I and II (introduced in 1953) have fixed lenses, while the later models have interchangeable lenses; eventually the Contaflexes became a camera system with a wide variety of accessories.

== History ==
The Mecaflex was presented at photokina 1951 and launched two years later as one of the first SLRs, fitted with a leaf shutter behind the removable lens and a waist-level viewfinder with a reflex mirror that swings out of the way during the film exposure. Compared to twin-lens reflex cameras, the SLR offered several advantages: photographer would be able to view the scene exactly through the same lens that would be used to expose the film, and only a single lens was required, reducing costs. The later Hasselblad 500C, introduced in 1957, is a similar SLR design that uses leaf shutters; for the Hasselblad, each of its interchangeable lenses has a shutter.

The first Contaflex SLRs were introduced in 1953, following the general design of the Mecaflex using a Compur leaf shutter and reflex mirror, but the Contaflex cameras were equipped with an integral eye-level finder and a fixed lens. The advantages of using the leaf shutter are low manufacturing costs, compactness, quieter operation, and flash synchronization at all shutter speeds. However, using a leaf shutter in an SLR requires additional mechanical complications to cock the shutter and return the mirror after the shutter is released and the film is wound; these were seen more as a challenge than a drawback at Zeiss Ikon, but no Contaflex model ever got a rapid return mirror.

However, only a very limited range of interchangeable lenses became available. For the models I and II, having a fixed lens, only three add-on converters were offered using a slide-on adapter, but from models III and IV onwards interchangeable lenses from 35mm to 115mm focal length were provided; at the time regarded as quite sufficient, as most would only be used with the standard lens anyway.

Three years later, during 1956, the Kodak Retina Reflex was launched, followed by the Voigtländer Bessamatic and the Ultramatic. The market soon flourished with leaf-shuttered SLR cameras. These mechanically complex cameras required precision assembly and high quality materials. More often than not many camera makes suffered from reliability issues, while the few better ones performed well, selling in quantity.

== Cameras ==
Contaflex SLR summary
Name		Image	Lens		Years sold
Without meter	With meter	Image	Standard	System	Years sold
I (861/24)	II (862/24)	Contaflex II	Tessar 45 mm f/2.8	fixed	1953–58
III (863/24)	IV (864/24)	Contaflex III	Tessar 50 mm f/2.8	Pro-Tessar convertible	1956–59
Alpha (10.1241)	Beta (10.1251)		Pantar 45 mm f/2.8	Pantar convertible	1957–59
Rapid (10.1261)	Super (10.1262)	Contaflex Super (old style)	Tessar 50 mm f/2.8	Pro-Tessar convertible	1958–63
N/A	Prima	Contaflex Prima, an SLR camera finished in chrome and black leather	Pantar 45 mm f/2.8	Pantar convertible	1959–65
N/A	Super (10.1271) Super B (10.1272)	Super B	Tessar 50 mm f/2.8	Pro-Tessar convertible	1962–65
N/A	Super BC (10.1273) S	Contaflex Super BC, an SLR camera finished in chrome and black leather	Tessar 50 mm f/2.8	Pro-Tessar convertible	1965–71

=== Contaflex I and II ===
Contaflex (I) and II
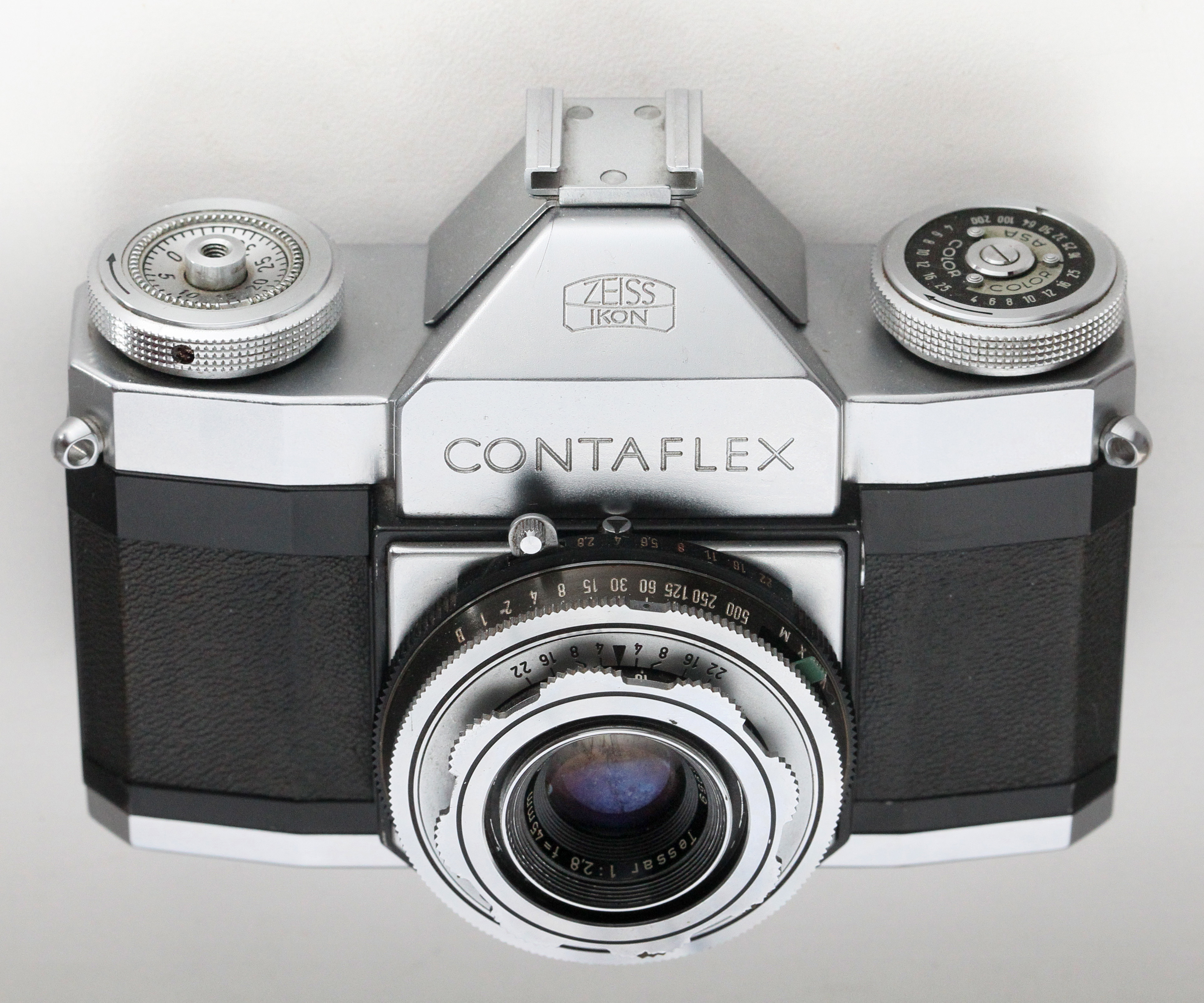
- Contaflex I SLR Camera

Overview
- Maker: Zeiss Ikon
- Production: 1953 (I) / 1954 (II) – 1958

Lens
- Lens mount: fixed

The Contaflex I, launched in 1953, was equipped with a fixed Zeiss Tessar 45 mm f/2.8 lens with front-cell focusing. The earliest Contaflex I cameras had a Synchro-Compur shutter with the old scale of shutter speeds (1-2-5-10-25-50-100-250-500) and no self-timer, but very soon it adopted the new scale 1-2-4-8-15-30-60-125-250-500.

The Contaflex II, introduced the following year, was the same camera with an uncoupled selenium meter added to one side of the front plate.

For both the Teleskop 1.7× supplementary lens could be attached to the front of the fixed lens using an accessory carrier bracket; as the name suggests, this extended the focal length by 70% to approximately 75 mm. The same bracket could be used for the Steritar A attachment, which was used for stereo photography.

=== Contaflex III and IV ===
Contaflex III and IV
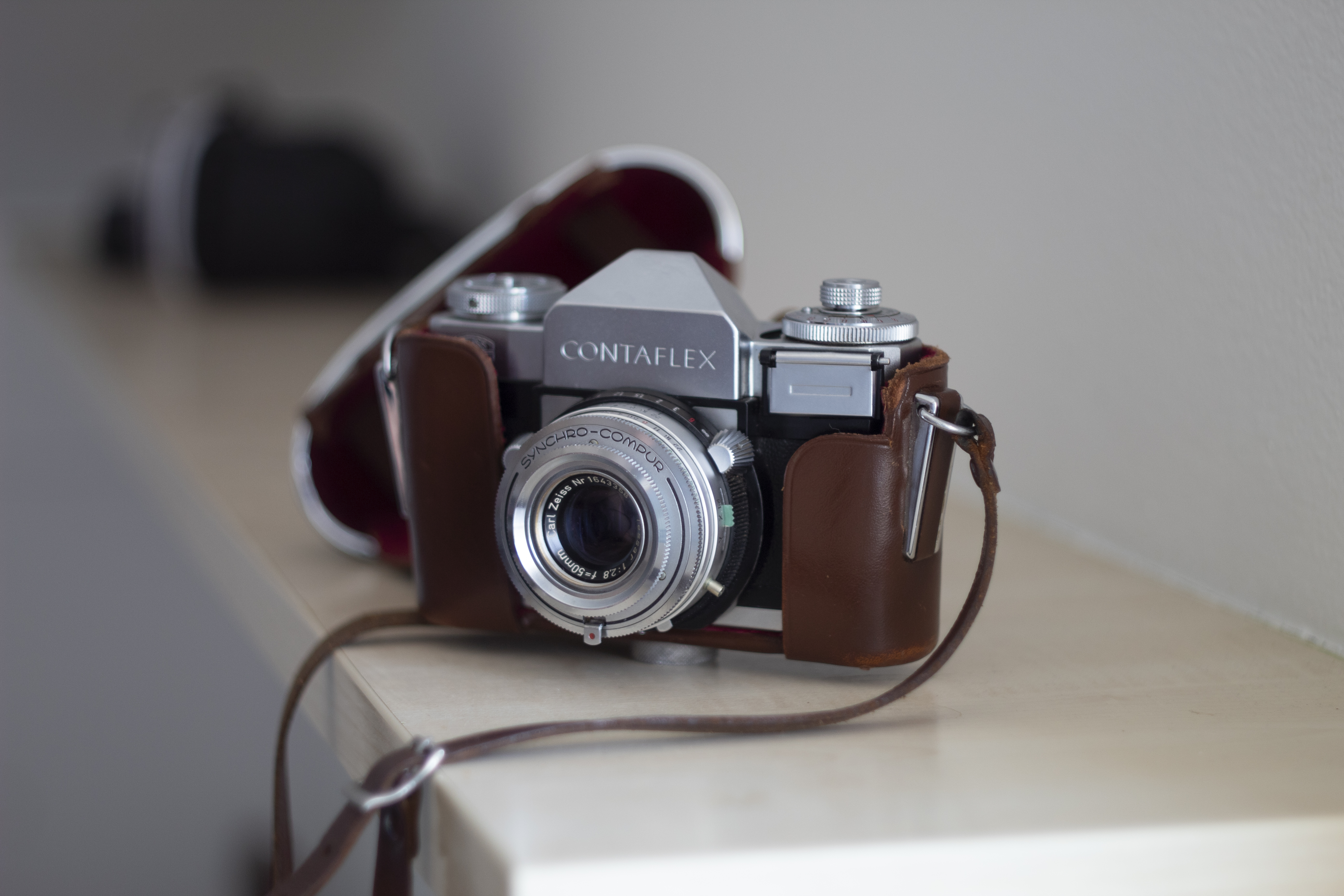
- Contaflex IV in case

Overview
- Maker: Zeiss Ikon
- Production: 1956 – 1959

Lens
- Lens mount: Pro-Tessar convertible

The Contaflex III, launched in 1956, was the same as the I, but equipped with a Zeiss Tessar 50mm f/2.8 with unit helical focusing.

The Contaflex IV, introduced the same year, was the same camera with the uncoupled meter inherited from the Contaflex II.

The III and IV were equipped with a convertible lens system branded Pro-Tessar, where the front element of the standard lens was removable and could be replaced by supplementary lenses, as discussed in the section Contaflex lenses, to create 35 mm and 80 mm lenses, both f/4.

=== Contaflex Alpha and Beta ===
The Contaflex Alpha and Contaflex Beta, both introduced in 1957, were lower-cost versions of the convertible-lens Contaflex III and IV, respectively; to reduce costs, the lens was changed to a Rodenstock (Zeiss-branded) Pantar 45 mm f/2.8 triplet with front-element focusing and the Compur shutter was replaced by a Prontor Reflex shutter, with a slight reduction in minimum shutter speed to 1/300.

The Alpha had no meter, like the I/III, and the Beta had the selenium meter of the II/IV.

The front element of the lens could be interchanged with supplemental lenses to create 30 mm and 75 mm lenses, both f/4. These supplemental lenses had been introduced and were shared with the earlier (1955) Contina III 35mm viewfinder camera.

=== Contaflex Rapid and Super ===
Contaflex Rapid and Super
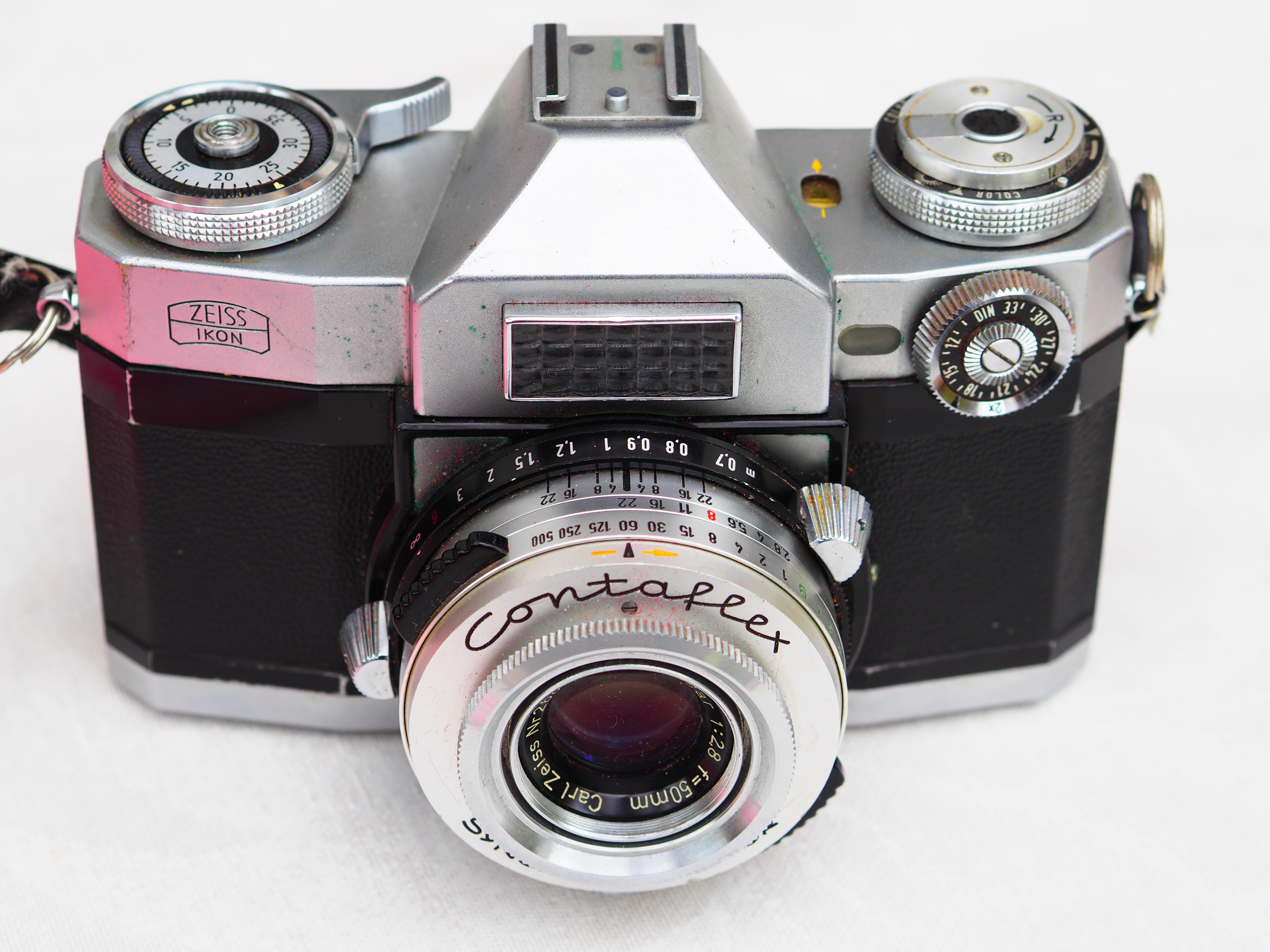
- Super

Overview
- Maker: Zeiss Ikon
- Production: 1958–60 (Rapid); 1959–63 (Super)

The Contaflex Rapid was introduced in 1958; compared to the III, which it replaced, the Rapid had a slightly longer body, a built-in accessory shoe, a winding lever and a rewind crank. It retained the 50 mm Tessar and convertible lens system from the III. The "Contaflex" name engraved on the front of the prism was changed to a script typeface instead of the sans-serif used on prior Contaflex cameras. It was the meterless version and was discontinued in 1960.

The Contaflex Super, launched the following year, was based on the Rapid and had a coupled selenium exposure meter on the front side of the prism. It is easily recognized by the wheel on the front plate for the setting of the film speed (DIN). The meter needle was visible in the finder as well as on the top plate from the outside. It is sometimes referred to parenthetically as the Super (old style) to avoid confusion with the later Super (new).

The major innovation for the Rapid/Super over the III/IV was the introduction of interchangeable film magazines, which permitted the photographer to swap emulsions mid-roll. The new body of the Rapid and Super allowed them to take magazine backs, interchangeable with a partly exposed film inside. Magazine backs, rare among 35mm cameras, also were supplied for the Contarex of Zeiss Ikon.

The Rapid and Super (old style) could take the same supplementary 35 mm f/4 and 80 mm f/4 lenses as the III and IV, and newer Pro-Tessar supplementary lenses were available for the Rapid and Super to create 35 mm f/3.2, 85 mm f/3.2, and 115 mm f/4 lenses.

=== Contaflex Prima ===
Contaflex Prima
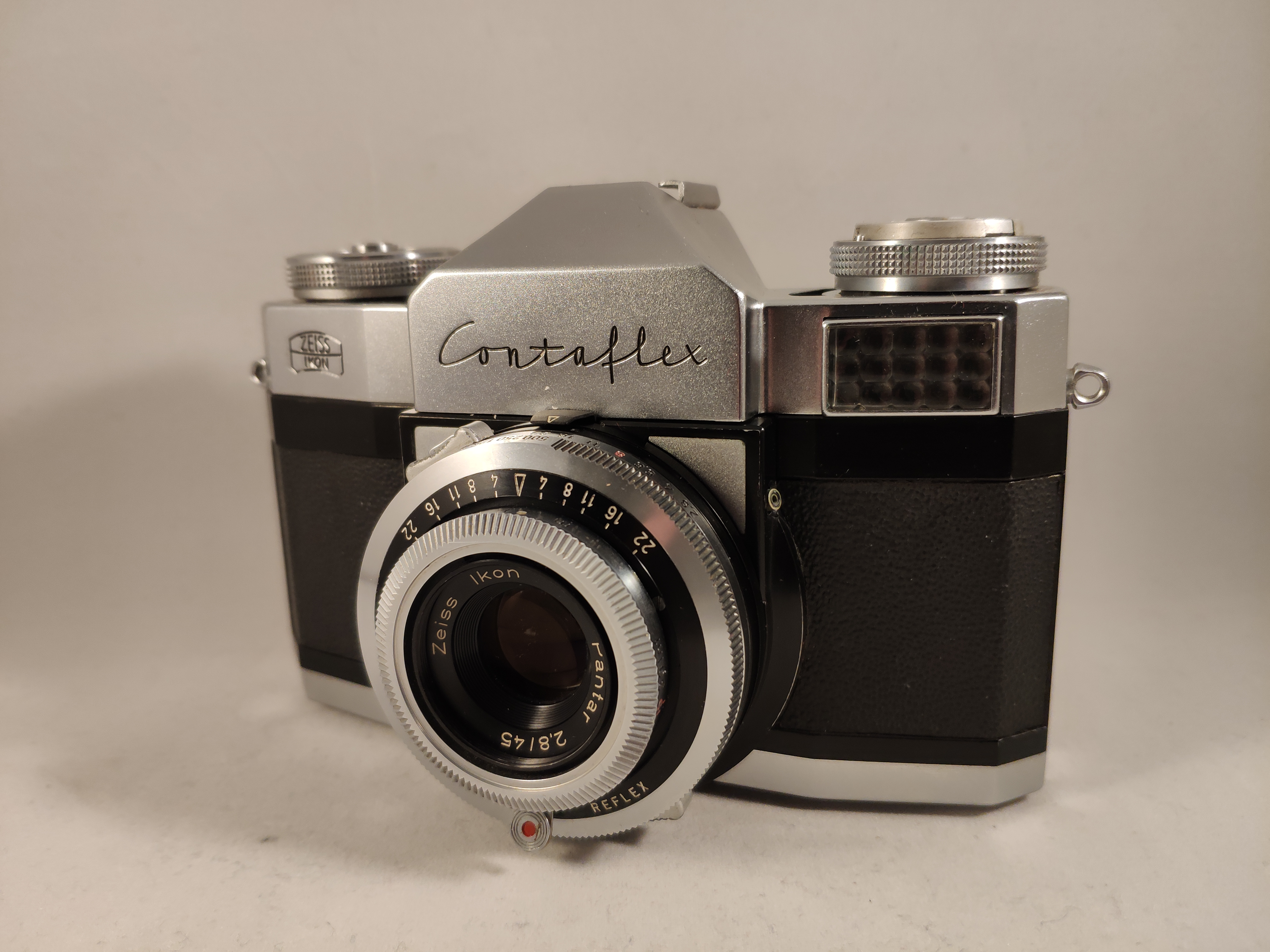
- Prima

Overview
- Maker: Zeiss Ikon
- Production: 1959 – 1965

The Contaflex Prima, launched in 1959 and sold until 1965, was based on the body of the Rapid, retaining the new film magazine and lever wind, but with costs reduced by fitting the Pantar triplet lens and the Prontor shutter like the Alpha and Beta. The Prima had a coupled exposure meter placed on the side of the front plate, similar to the Beta.

The Prima could take the same Pantar supplementary lenses as the Alpha and Beta.

=== Contaflex Super (new) and Super B ===
Contaflex Super (new) and Super B
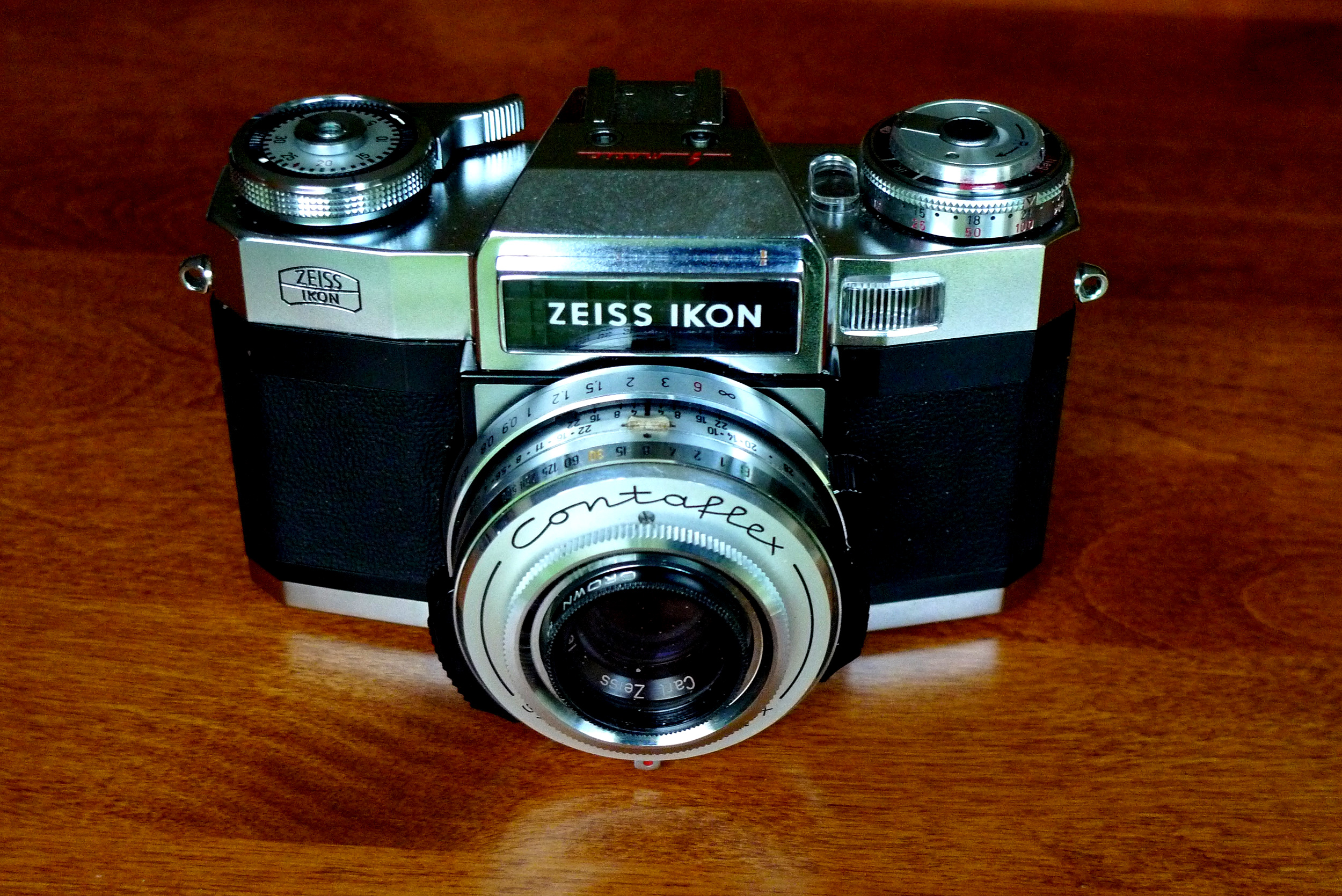
- Contaflex Super B

Overview
- Maker: Zeiss Ikon
- Production: 1962 – 1967

Exposure/metering
- Exposure: shutter-priority automatic (Super B)

The Contaflex Super (new) and Contaflex Super B are very similar cameras. Both have a new body design, being longer with added bulk. The information about which came first is a bit contradictory in some reference books, but it seems the Super (new) was launched in 1962, introducing the new body design and a new selenium exposure meter in a prominent rectangle marked Zeiss Ikon in front of the prism. The aperture wheel was replaced by a more traditional aperture command, and the meter read-out was visible both on the exterior and in the finder.

The Super B was launched in 1963, and added a shutter-priority automatic aperture, and some other small changes. The Super B can be distinguished by the presence of an "A"utomatic setting for the shutter speed ring and an EV scale in the viewfinder.

From the Super (new) and Super B, the Zeiss Tessar 50mm f:2.8 lens was recomputed and supposedly performed better. They could still take the same supplementary lenses, with one exception discussed in the relevant section.

=== Contaflex Super BC and S ===
Contaflex Super BC and S
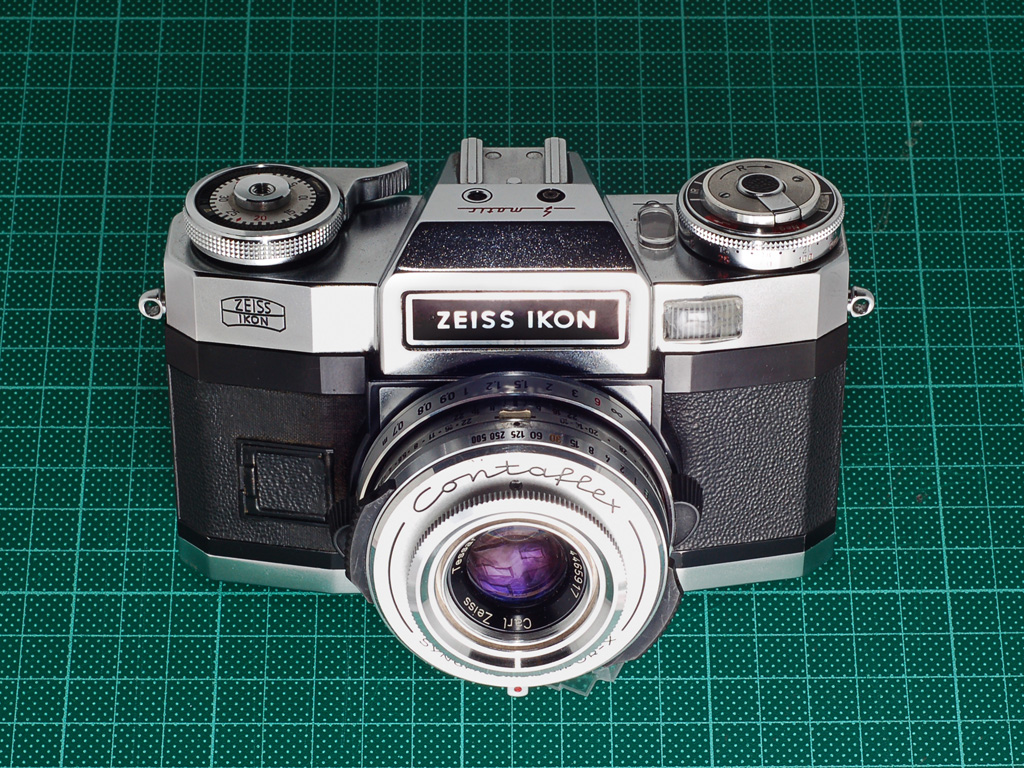
- Contaflex Super BC

Overview
- Maker: Zeiss Ikon
- Production: 1965 (BC) / 1968 (S) – 1972

The Contaflex Super BC was introduced in 1965, and was a Super B with the selenium meter replaced by a CdS through-the-lens exposure meter. It still had a black rectangle marked Zeiss Ikon on the front of the prism, but it was only decorative. It had a battery compartment at the bottom front.

The Contaflex S was the last variant, introduced in 1968, and was simply a renamed Super BC, sold until Zeiss Ikon ceased production in 1972. It had a black rectangle marked Contaflex S on the front, and a different, newer Zeiss Ikon logo. It proudly sported the word Automatic on the front of the shutter.

The Super BC and S could take the magazine backs, as well as the usual supplementary lenses.

Both the Contaflex Super BC and S were, along with the 126-format Contaflex 126, available in chrome or black finish.

=== Contaflex 126 ===
Contaflex 126
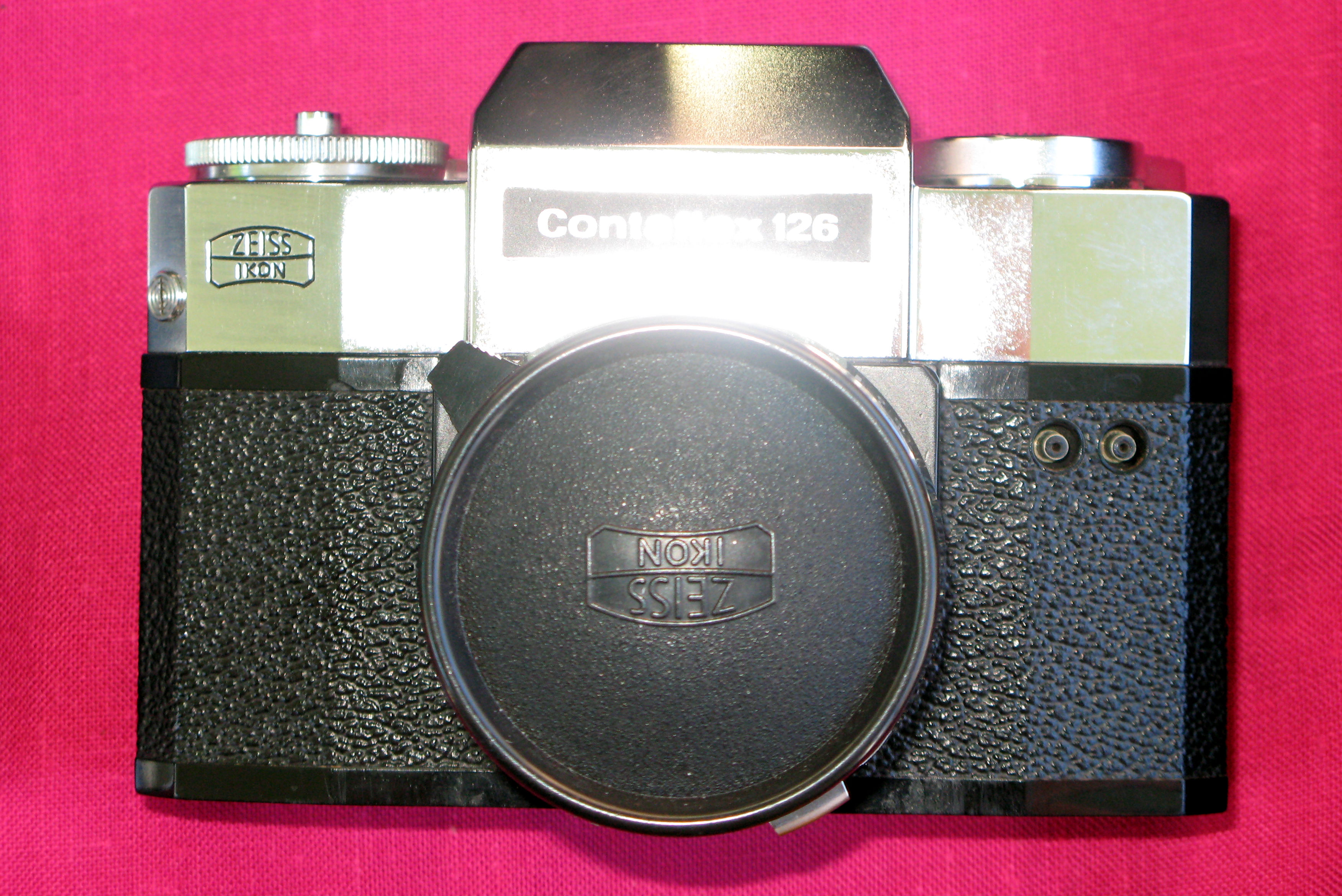

Overview
- Maker: Zeiss Ikon
- Type: 126 SLR camera

Focusing
- Focus: manual

Exposure/metering
- Exposure: manual

The Contaflex 126 is related to the Contaflex SLR family primarily by its name and general appearance, as it takes a different film format (126 film) and uses a different shutter technology (focal plane shutter) than the rest of the family. Voigtländer had developed it as the Icarex 126, and it was released as a Zeiss Ikon camera after Voigtländer's operations were consolidated into its larger parent in the late 1960s. It was introduced in 1967 to accept Kodak 126 (Instamatic) cartridges. It was one of the very few SLRs taking 126 film, and one of the very few cameras using that film aimed at the premium market. Two other examples of 126 SLRs are the Rollei SL26 and Kodak Instamatic Reflex.

Former Zeiss-Ikon chief designer Hubert Nerwin, who designed the famous CONTAX 2 and 3 rangefinder cameras and other cameras for Zeiss-Ikon, later invented the 126 film cassette. This was after he emigrated to the U.S. after World War 2 and was working for Kodak.

The Contaflex 126 is an SLR with a focal-plane shutter and interchangeable lenses. It was available in chrome or black finish.

The range of lenses was:

- Zeiss Distagon 25/4
- Zeiss Distagon 32/2.8
- Zeiss Color-Pantar 45/2.8, three-element, cheaper
- Zeiss Tessar 45/2.8, four-element, better
- Zeiss Sonnar 85/2.8
- Zeiss Tele-Tessar 135/4
- Zeiss Tele-Tessar 200/4

The Contaflex 126 lenses are often confused with other lenses by the sellers. They can only be used on the Contaflex 126 body, which can only accept the obsolete 126 film cartridge, so the value of these lenses is not very high, despite their famous names.

=== Weber SL75 ===
When Zeiss Ikon stopped making cameras in 1972, they had prototypes in various stages of development. One of them was the SL725, which would be a successor to the Contaflex line with an electronic shutter. The prototype ended in the hands of a company named Weber, which presented the camera at a photokina show under the name Weber SL75, but could not afford to put it into production, and did not find a partner to do so. The lens mount was a modification of the Contarex camera lens mount. Carl Zeiss advertised a range of lenses for the Weber SL75, all with the T* multicoating:

- 18/4 Distagon
- 25/2.8 Distagon
- 35/2.8 Distagon
- 50/1.4 Planar
- 85/2.8 Sonnar
- 135/2.8 Sonnar
- 200/3.5 Tele-Tessar

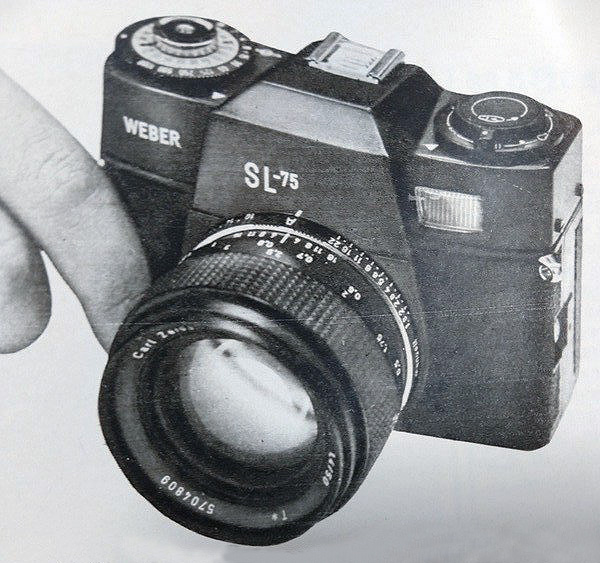

An eBay seller seems to have uncovered a small stock of the Planar lens, and has recently sold a couple of them. Recently (2021), several of these lenses have surfaced again and were sold on eBay. No SL75 body seems to have surfaced so far, and the only picture found on the web is here and from an Italian photo magazine as a preview in their Nov. 1974 issue, as seen to the right.

== Contaflex lenses ==
There are three classes of supplemental lenses available for Contaflex SLRs, which are not interchangeable between class:

Contaflex supplemental lenses
Class	Lens	Cameras	Available supplemental lenses
Fixed	Tessar 45 mm f/2.8	I and II	Teleskop 1.7× (teleconverter), requires bracket; Steritar A, requires bracket
Convertible	Pantar 45 mm f/2.8	Alpha, Beta, and Prima	Pantar 30 mm f/4; Pantar 75 mm f/4; Steritar D
Convertible	Tessar 50 mm f/2.8	III, IV, Rapid, Super, Super (new), Super B, Super BC, and S	Pro-Tessar 35 mm f/4; Pro-Tessar 35 mm f/3.2; Pro-Tessar 85 mm f/4; Pro-Tessar 85 mm f/3.2; Pro-Tessar 115 mm f/4; Monocular 8×30B (400 mm); Pro-Tessar M 1:1 50 mm f/5.6; Steritar B; Near Steritar

The Contaflex I and II could only take the Teleskop 1.7x supplementary lenses, and the Alpha, Beta and Prima had their own limited range of Pantar supplementary lenses.

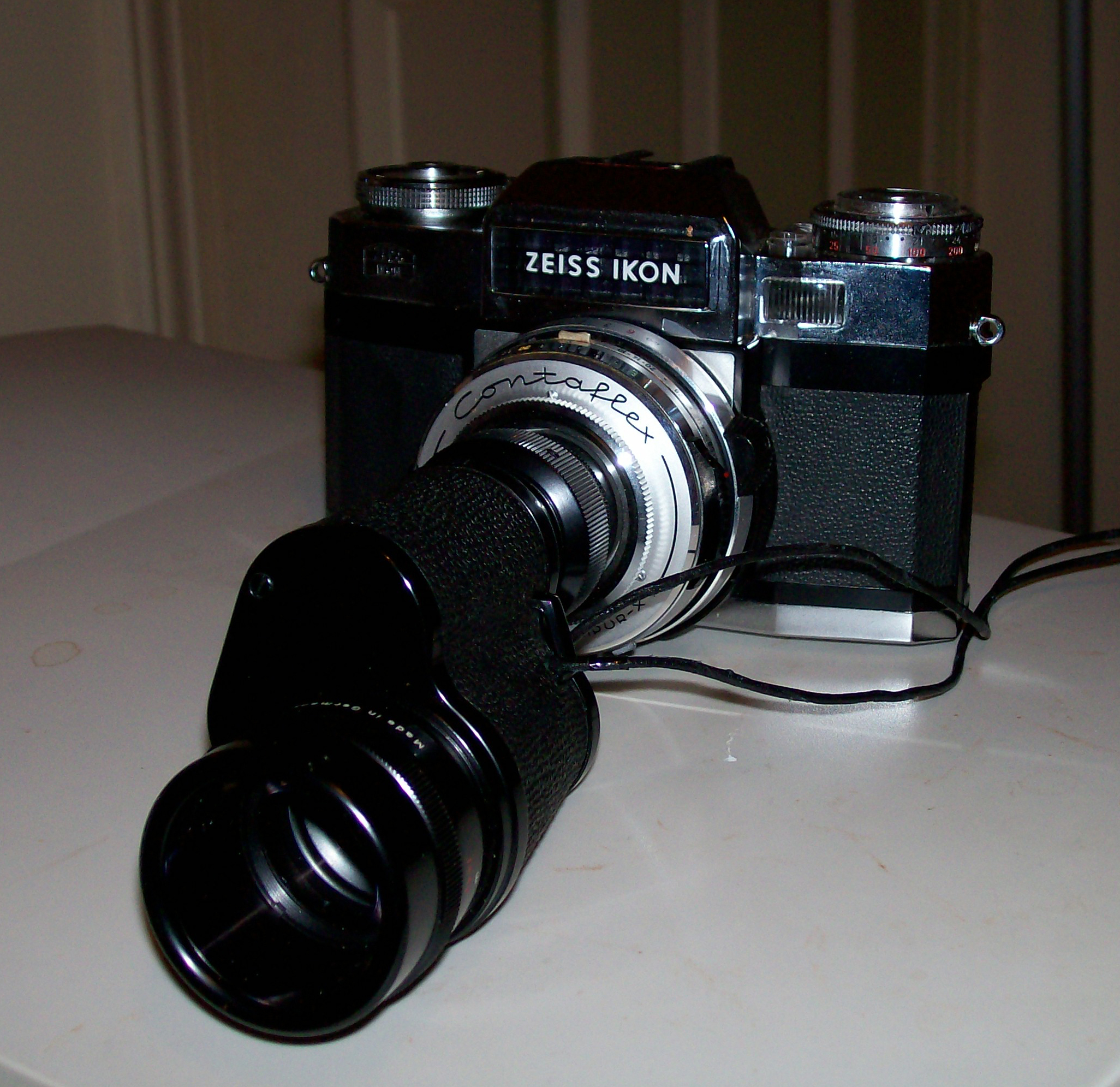
Contaflex SuperB+Zeiss 8x30B monocular

The models III, IV, Rapid, Super, Super (new), Super B, Super BC and S all have a Zeiss Tessar 50mm f:2.8 lens (27mm screw-in or 28.5mm push-on filters); the front element can be removed and replaced by a supplemental lens:

- Zeiss Pro-Tessar 35/4 (49mm filters), later replaced by the Pro-Tessar 35/3.2 (60mm screw-over filters)
- Zeiss Pro-Tessar 85/4 (60mm screw-over filters), later replaced by the Pro-Tessar 85/3.2 (60mm filters)
- Zeiss Pro-Tessar 115/4 (67mm filters)
- Monocular 8x30B, equivalent to a 400mm lens (attaches to the 50mm f/2.8 Tessar lens).

There was also a Zeiss Pro-Tessar M 1:1 supplementary lens, that kept the focal length of 50mm but allowed 1:1 reproduction. The effective speed of the M 1:1 lens is f/5.6. The 50mm standard front elements, as well as the Pro-Tessar M 1:1 elements, were different between the early models III, IV, Rapid and Super with the old model of Tessar, and the later models Super (new), Super B, Super BC and S with the recomputed Tessar. It appears that the mount was very slightly modified, and it seems physically impossible to mismatch the elements as the journal diameter above the bayonet mount had been reduced by approximately .006"

There were also stereo attachments:

- Steritar A for the Contaflex I and II
- Steritar B for the other Tessar-equipped models
- Near Steritar for close up stereo pictures .2 – 2.5 meters

(Normally interchangeable with the older Tessar line of Steritar B camera lenses)

- Steritar D for the Pantar-equipped models

A complete line of these Contaflex Steritar lenses can be seen at (https://www.flickr.com/photos/12670411@N02/)

Zeiss Proxar for Contaflex: 1M,0.5M,0.3M,0.2M and 0.1M

== Accessories ==
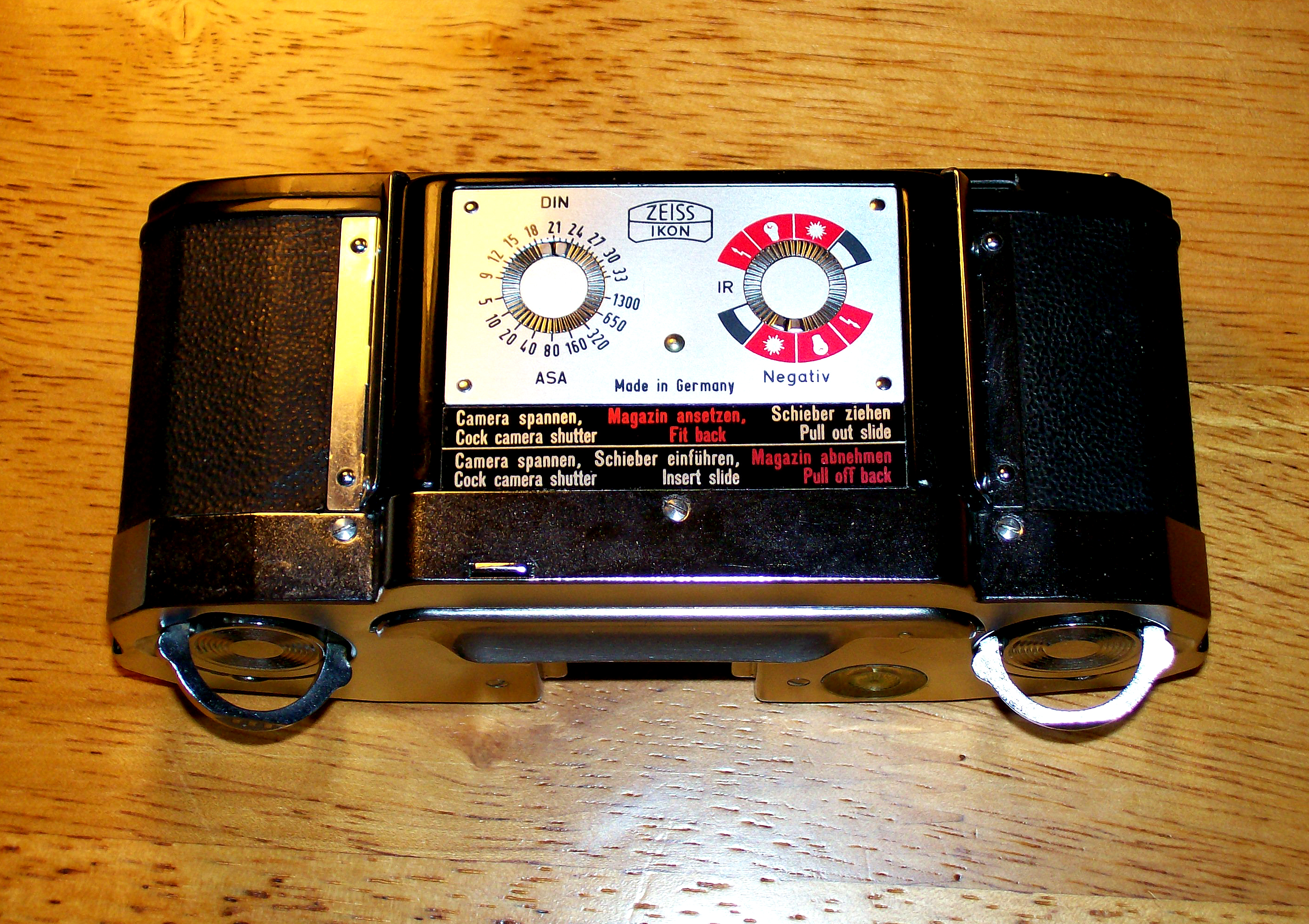
Contaflex Super B film back

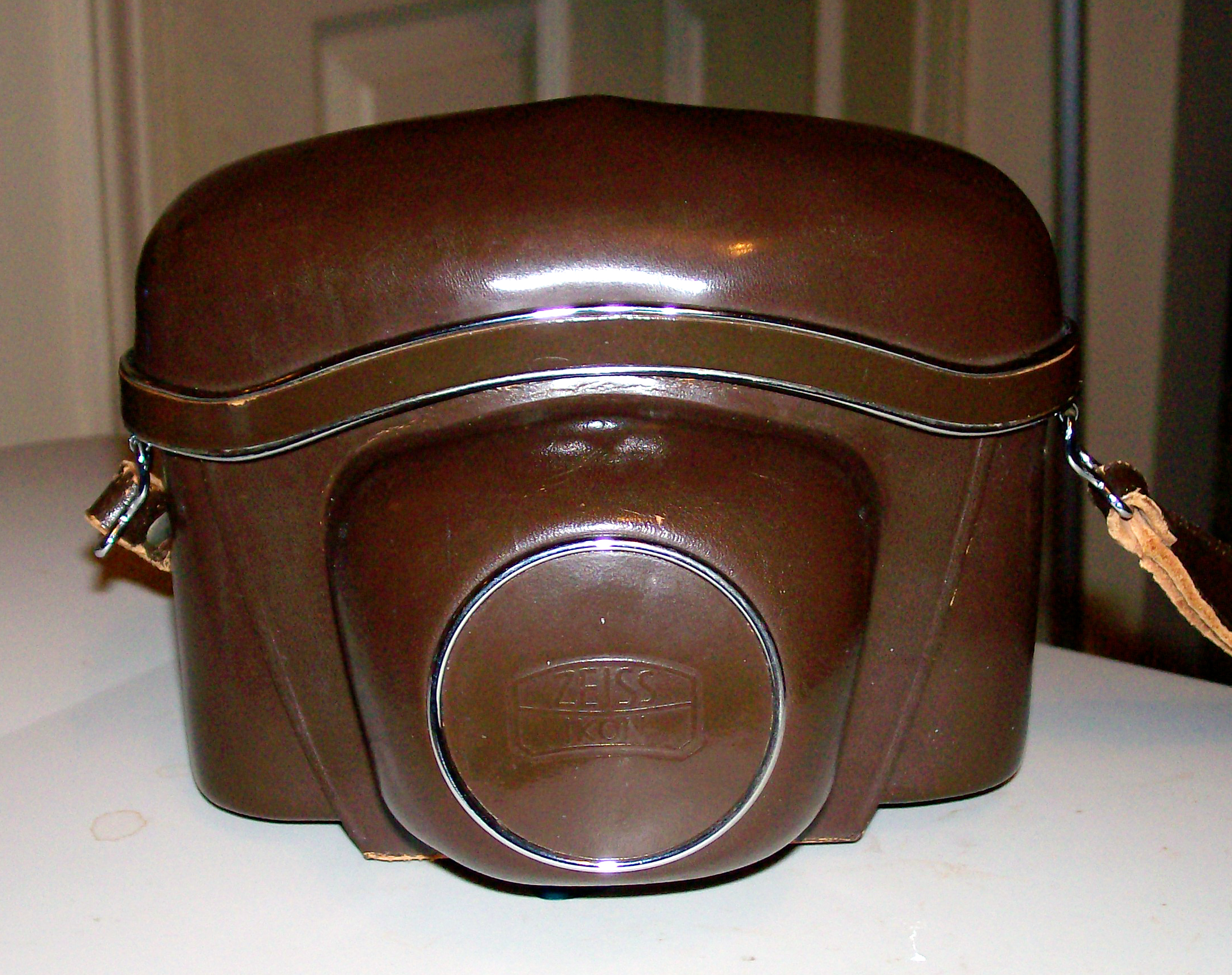
Contaflex Super B Zeiss Ikon leather case
- Slip on metal lens hood
- Screw in metal lens hood
- Film back
- Zeiss Proxar lens set
