= Zoomar lens =

Zoom lens

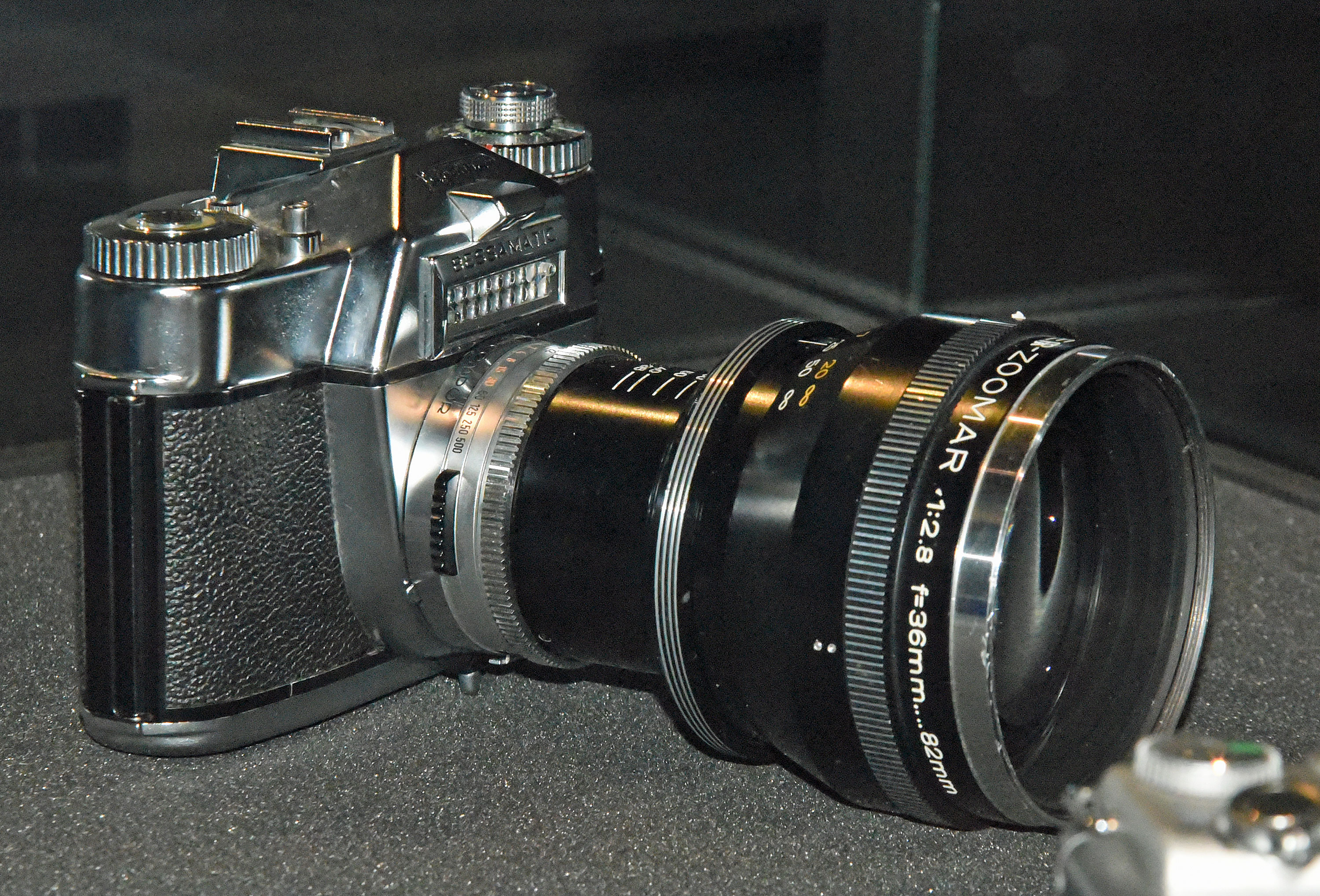
1959 Voigtländer Bessamatic, fitted with DKL-mount Zoomar lens (36~82 mm, f/2.8), first production zoom lens for still photography

The Zoomar lens was the first commercially successful zoom lens, designed by optical engineer Frank G. Back as an outgrowth of his research on viewfinders and variable focal length projectors for the United States military.

== History ==
Back developed an accessory "Vario-focus" viewfinder (designated PH-532/UF) for the Bell & Howell Eyemo camera variant PH-330-C issued by the United States Army Signal Corps during World War II; this incorporated many of the same principles as the commercial Zoomar lens, including the use of optical compensation.

Optical compensation principle of the "varifocal lens for cameras" by Frank G. Back (1946), from US Pat. 2,454,686

Back applied for a patent in 1946 for a "Varifocal lens for cameras", which described the theory of its operation, using five sets of lenses: ordered from the object to the film, these were the front lens, variator, erector, compensator, and relay, with the variator and compensator mechanically fixed to each other and moving along the optical axis to vary the focal length; the other three sets of lenses remained stationary relative to the film plane. In the preferred embodiment, there were twenty-two lens elements in total: the front lens was a cemented group of two elements, the variator was an air-spaced group of four elements, the erector was an approximately symmetric set of eight elements in four cemented doublets, the compensator was a single cemented doublet, and the relay lens was an approximately symmetric air-spaced group of six elements.

A prototype version was used by WCBS-TV on July 21, 1947, to cover the Brooklyn Dodgers / Cincinnati Reds game. The first commercial version was used by Paramount newsreel photographers to cover the 1947 World Series.

In 1949, WAVE-TV became the first television station in the United States, to present a live telecast of the Kentucky Derby. The telecast was the first use of a Zoomar Lens in a television sports broadcast. The lens was loaned to WAVE by Back. Not long after the Derby, WAVE acquired a Zoomar lens of its own, which was frequently loaned to the other stations owned by WAVE-TV.

Zoomar 36~82 mm lens diagram, Focusing: via the front lens, Zoom: green: wide-angle, gray: telephoto (from US Pat. 2,913,957)

In 1968 Dr. Back bought the German optical firm Kilfitt from its owner Heinz Kilfitt, who retired. Kilfitt was one of the best and most innovative German lens makers of the 1950s and 1960s. The Münich factory started to produce the first production zoom lens in 1959 for 35mm still photography, the famous 36-82/2.8 Zoomar. It was originally made in Voigtländer Bessamatic and Exakta mount. Most Kilfitt and Zoomar lenses left the factory with versatile interchangeable lens mounts.

In 1986 Zoomar left the civilian market, concentrating on US military optics.

== Inventor ==
Frank Gerhard Back was born on August 25, 1902, in Vienna, Austria-Hungary. He earned bachelor's and doctoral degrees from the Technische Hochschule of Vienna and subsequently was employed by Georg Wolf, designing endoscopes. In July 1939, he emigrated to the United States. His varifocal lens design was an outgrowth of work he had previously performed for motion picture camera viewfinders and the projector part of a torpedo-targeting trainer. He died on July 6, 1983, in San Diego.

Jerry Fairbanks hired Back to develop the Zoomar lens and also financed its development.

== Cultural influence ==
In 1957, Ernie Kovacs published his novel Zoomar, named after the lens and billed as "a sophisticated novel about love and TV". The novel chronicles a network executive's descent into madness.
