= Voigtländer Prominent =

35mm rangefinder camera

Prominent
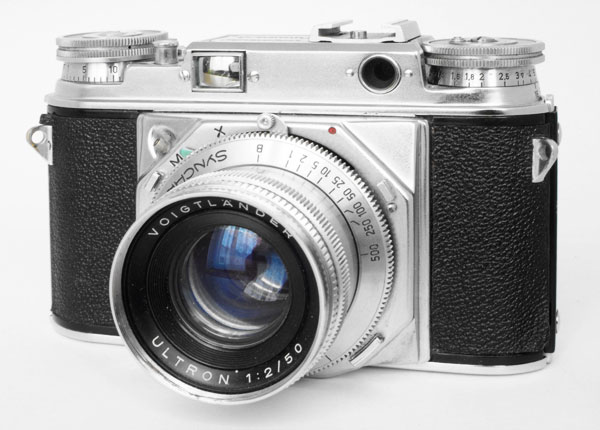
- ProminenT with Ultron 50 mm f/2.0 double-Gauss lens

Overview
- Maker: Voigtländer
- Type: 35mm rangefinder camera

Lens
- Lens mount: proprietary bayonet

Focusing
- Focus: manual

Exposure/metering
- Exposure: manual

Shutter
- Shutter: Synchro-Compur leaf, behind-lens
- Shutter speeds: 1–1/500 + B, X/M

General
- Dimensions: 5 1/4 in × 3 5/8 in × 3 1/4 in (133 mm × 92 mm × 83 mm) (with lens)
- Weight: 25 oz (710 g) (without lens)

Prominent refers to two distinct lines of rangefinder cameras made by Voigtländer.

The first Prominent, stylized in all-caps as PROMINENT and also known as the Prominent 6×9 to distinguish it from the later camera line, was a folding, fixed-lens rangefinder camera that used 120 film and was first marketed in 1932. Relatively few were sold and the post-war Prominent, using 135 film, is better known.

The second Prominent (stylized with small caps as ProminenT) was a line of 35mm interchangeable lens cameras built after World War II in the 1950s, equipped with leaf shutters. The second line of Prominent cameras were marketed as professional system cameras against the Leica threadmount and M bayonet mount and Zeiss Ikon Contax rangefinder camera lines. Voigtländer also sold the Vitessa and Vito lines of compact 35mm rangefinders contemporaneously, generally equipped with fixed, collapsible normal lenses, as less-expensive alternatives to the Prominent.

== Cameras ==
=== Prominent 6×9 ===
The Prominent 6×9 was introduced in 1932 as the top-of-the-line folding rollfilm camera from Voigtländer, which also sold similar models with fewer features as the Bessa, Virtus, Perkeo, and Inos. The base-board opens when a button is depressed, and the spring-loaded lens carrier advances to the correct position, making the camera ready for exposure. It is equipped with a fixed Heliar anastigmat 105 mm f/4.5 lens, developed contemporaneously with and similar to the Carl Zeiss Tessar, and one of two supplemental Focar close-up lenses can be added for portraits or macro photography. The Compur leaf shutter features speeds ranging from 1–1/250 sec, plus "B"ulb and "T"imer settings along with a self-timer delayed release. An extinction meter is used to set the appropriate aperture and shutter speed.

Records indicate that approximately 10,000 Prominent 6×9 cameras were made from 1932 to 1935, including 5 prototypes with a faster "Turbo" shutter with a top speed of 1/400 sec. The Prominent 6×9 was renamed to the Bessa Rangefinder starting in 1935, capitalizing on the more recognized branding.

=== "Miniature" Prominent 35mm ===
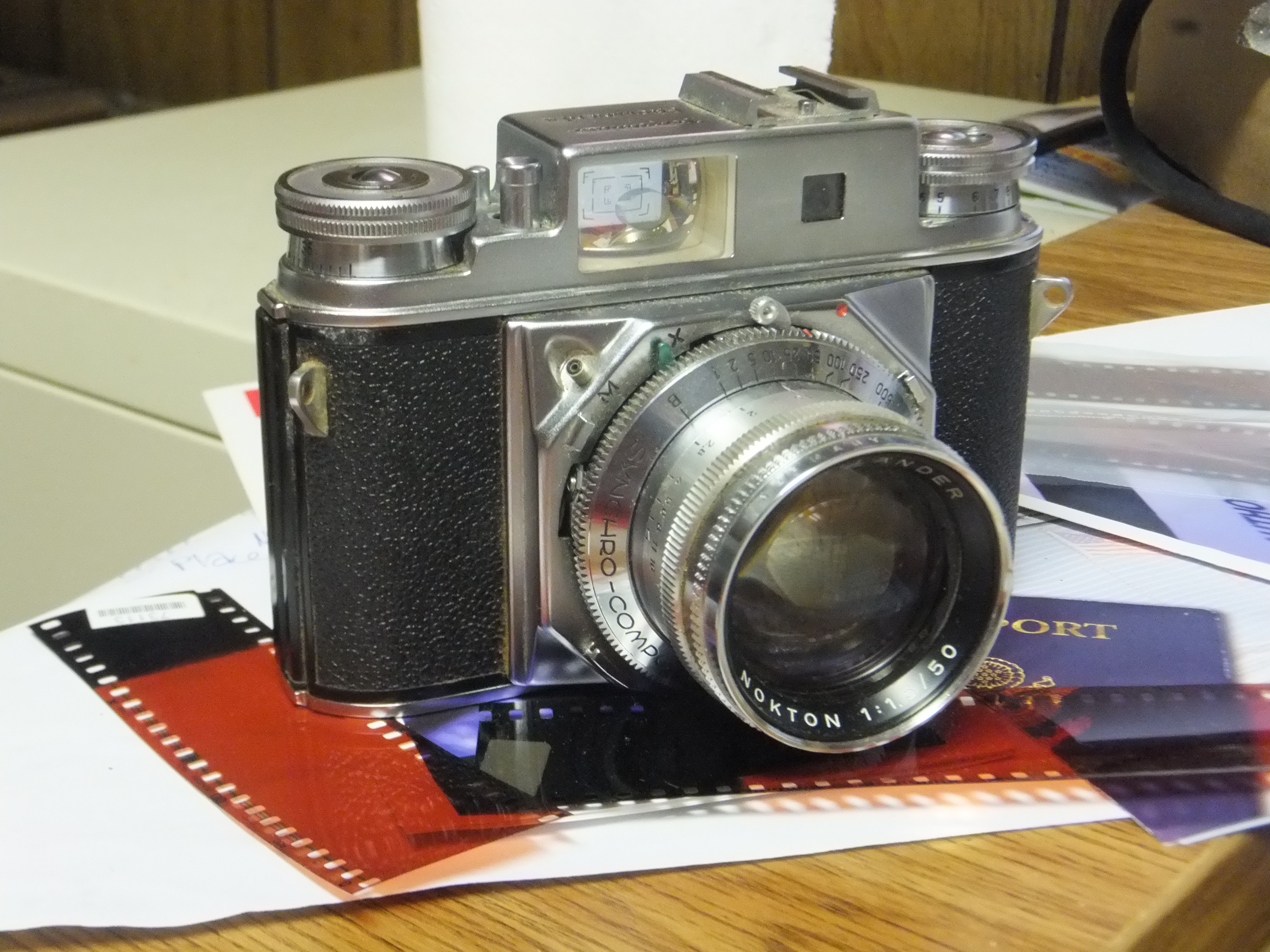
ProminenT II with Nokton lens

The "miniature" Prominent which takes 135 film was introduced in 1952 and produced until 1958, when it was succeeded by the ProminenT II, which was produced until 1960. The original Prominent (135) included numerous detail improvements over its production run, mainly to minor items including the inclusion of strap lugs and a film reminder on the baseplate with later models; the Prominent II has a distinctive, larger Albada-type viewfinder and square rangefinder window, while the original Prominent has a smaller, rectangular viewfinder and round rangefinder window, although the camera bodies are basically the same. The earliest Prominent (135) has a Synchro-Compur shutter with a top speed of 1/400 sec, which was updated to 1/500 sec within a year.

== Operation ==
Exposure (aperture and shutter speed) are set on the lens, while focus is set using a knob on the top deck, operated by the photographer's left hand.

== Lenses ==
The primary normal lenses were branded Ultron and Nokton; both lens types were designed by Albrecht Tronnier. Stephen Gandy notes the "Nokton was one of the very best fast lenses of the 50's, even a good performer by today's standards." A simpler Tessar-based Color-Skopar lens designed by Tronnier was available as well.

The initial set of accessory lenses, the Ultragon wide-angle and the Telomar telephoto, were each attached to a reflex housing to assist focus; the Telomar was designed by Tronnier. Tronnier also designed three later accessory lenses, the Skoparon wide-angle and Dynaron & Super Dynaron telephotos, all of which coupled directly to the body without a reflex housing.

Lenses for the Prominent (135)
FL (mm)	Aperture	Name	Diagram	Construction		Notes
FL (mm)	Aperture	Name	Diagram	Ele	Grp	Notes
24	f/5.8	Ultragon		7	5	Retrofocus design, attached to reflex housing; very limited production
35	f/3.5	Skoparon		5	4	Retrofocus design, negative front meniscus with Skopar
50	f/1.5	Nokton		7	5	Modified double Gauss lens
50	f/2.0	Ultron		6	5	Modified double Gauss lens
50	f/3.5	Color-Skopar		4	3	Tessar-type
100	f/4.5	Dynaron		6	4	Rangefinder-coupled
100	f/5.5	Telomar		5	4	Attached to reflex housing
150	f/4.5	Super Dynaron		6	4	Rangefinder-coupled
