= Voigtländer Vitessa =

35mm rangefinder camera

Vitessa
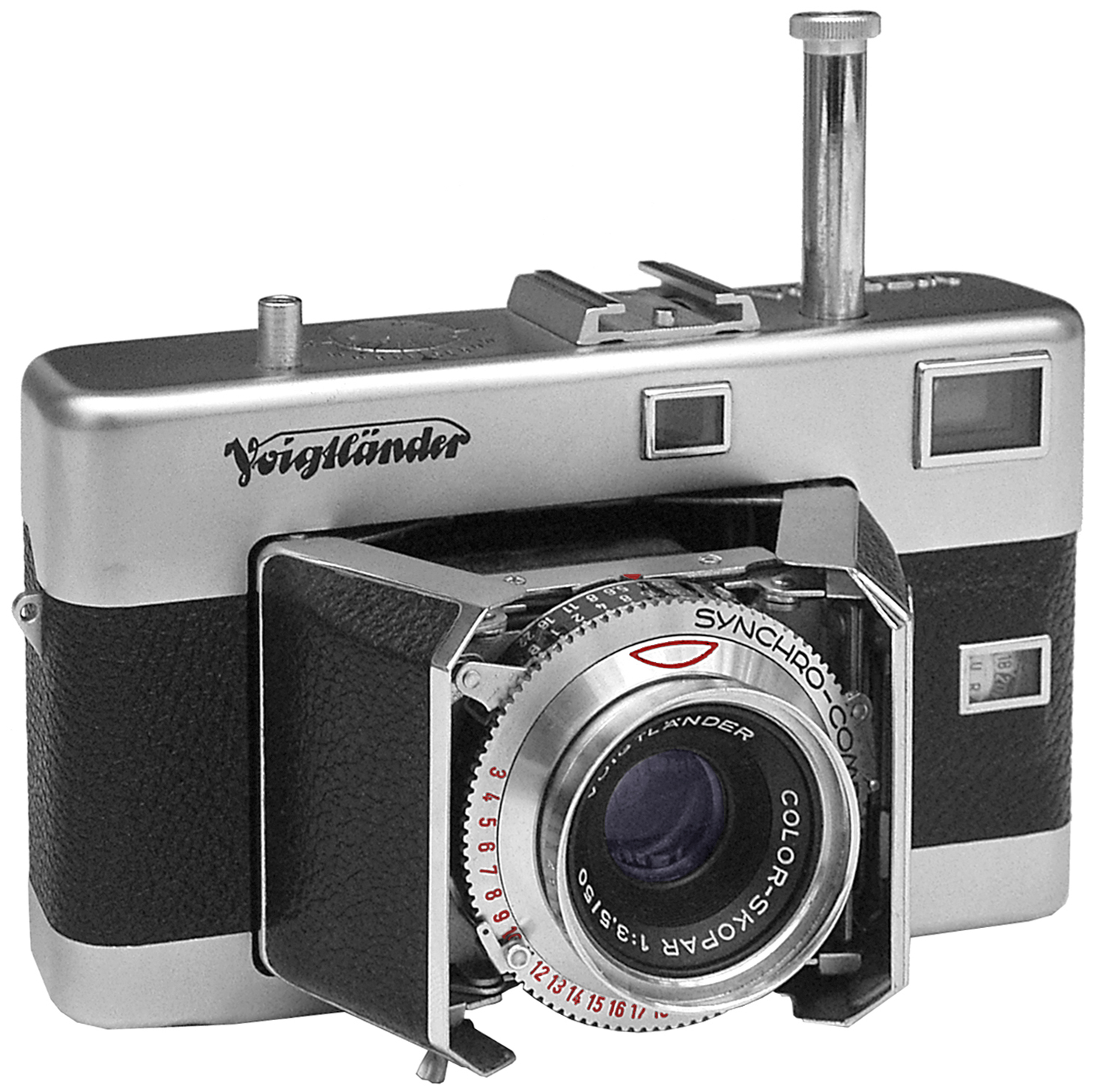
- Vitessa (N) with Color-Skopar 50 mm f/3.5 lens (Tessar-type)

Overview
- Maker: Voigtländer
- Type: 35mm rangefinder camera

Lens
- Lens mount: fixed or DKL-mount (Vitessa T)

Focusing
- Focus: manual

Exposure/metering
- Exposure: manual

Shutter
- Shutter: Synchro-Compur leaf
- Shutter speeds: 1–1/500 + B, X/M

General
- Dimensions: 5 3/8 in × 3 in × 1 5/8 in (137 mm × 76 mm × 41 mm) (A, closed)
- Weight: 24 oz (680 g) (A)

The Vitessa was a line of 35mm compact rangefinder cameras made by Voigtländer in the 1950s, equipped with leaf shutters, similar in concept to and marketed against the competing Kodak Retina cameras manufactured by Kodak. Most of the Vitessa cameras were fixed-lens models equipped with collapsable lenses for portability. One of the later Vitessa models, the Vitessa T (1956), introduced the Deckel (DKL) bayonet mount for interchangeable photographic lenses.

When sold by Voigtländer, the Vitessa line was their mid-range rangefinder camera, positioned between the professional Prominent (135) and the entry-level Vito / Vitomatic / Vitoret.

== Cameras ==
The original Vitessa was introduced in 1950 with a fast Ultron 50 mm f/2.0 lens. It was joined later by a version with a Color-Skopar 50 mm f/3.5 (Tessar-type) lens. Contemporary marketing materials emphasized the rapid operation of the camera: by pressing the shutter release button, positioned on the top deck for the photographer's right index finger, the camera doors opened and the lens moved into position; after each exposure, a tall plunger for the photographer's left hand is depressed, advancing the film and cocking the shutter for the next exposure.

Variations of the first Vitessa, which has no light meter, include the original, designated by some as Vitessa A, and an updated version, Vitessa N, with minor differences between the two; externally, the N adds an accessory shoe and moves the PC sync terminal from the lens to one of the lens cap doors. There are numerous sub-variants of the A and N. In Germany, the Vitessa was nicknamed the Leuchtturm (lighthouse), after the tall film-advance/cocking plunger, and the Scheunentor (barn door), after the lens capping mechanism.

Voigtländer Vitessa rangefinders

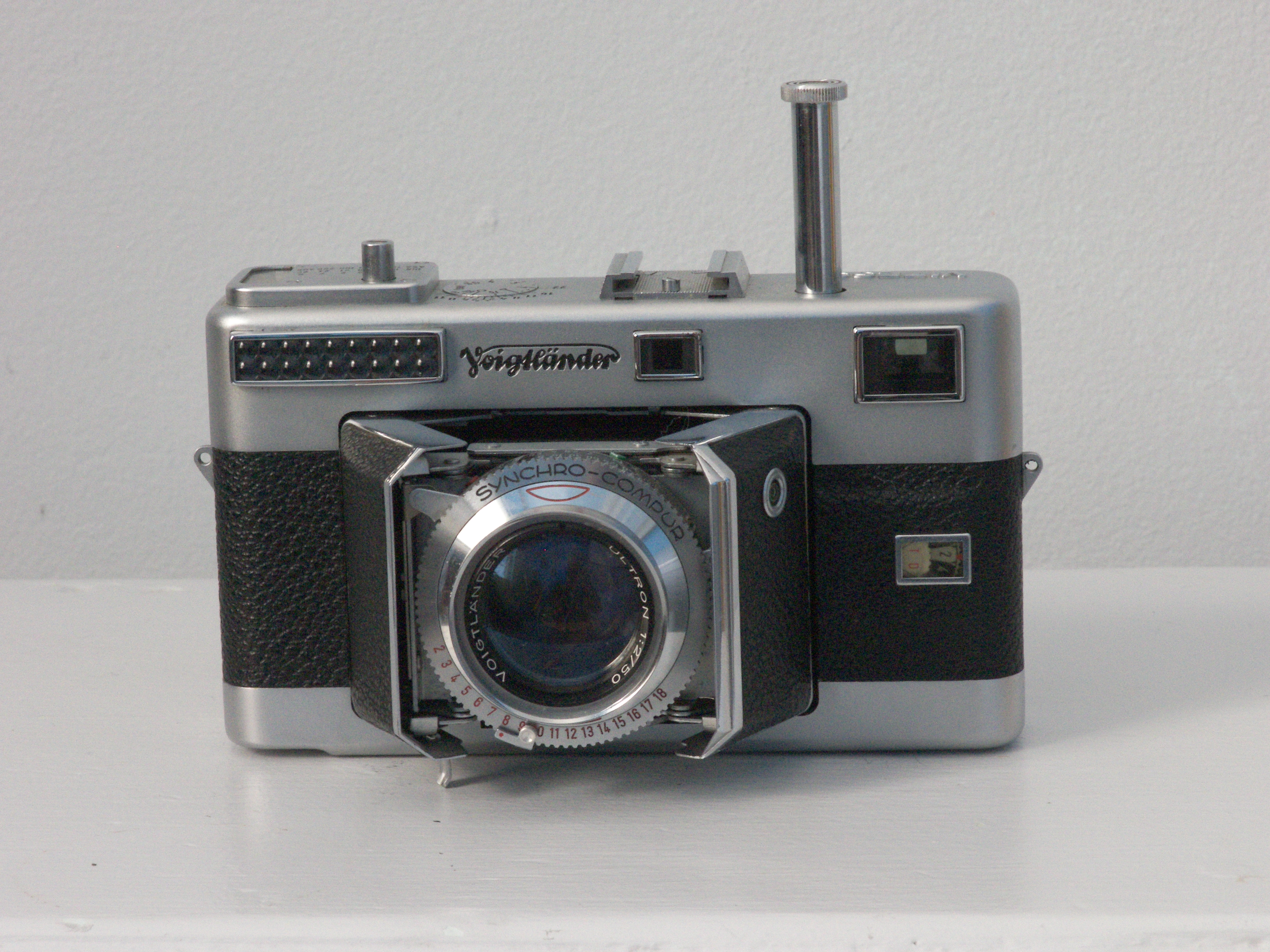
Vitessa L with light meter window and Ultron lens

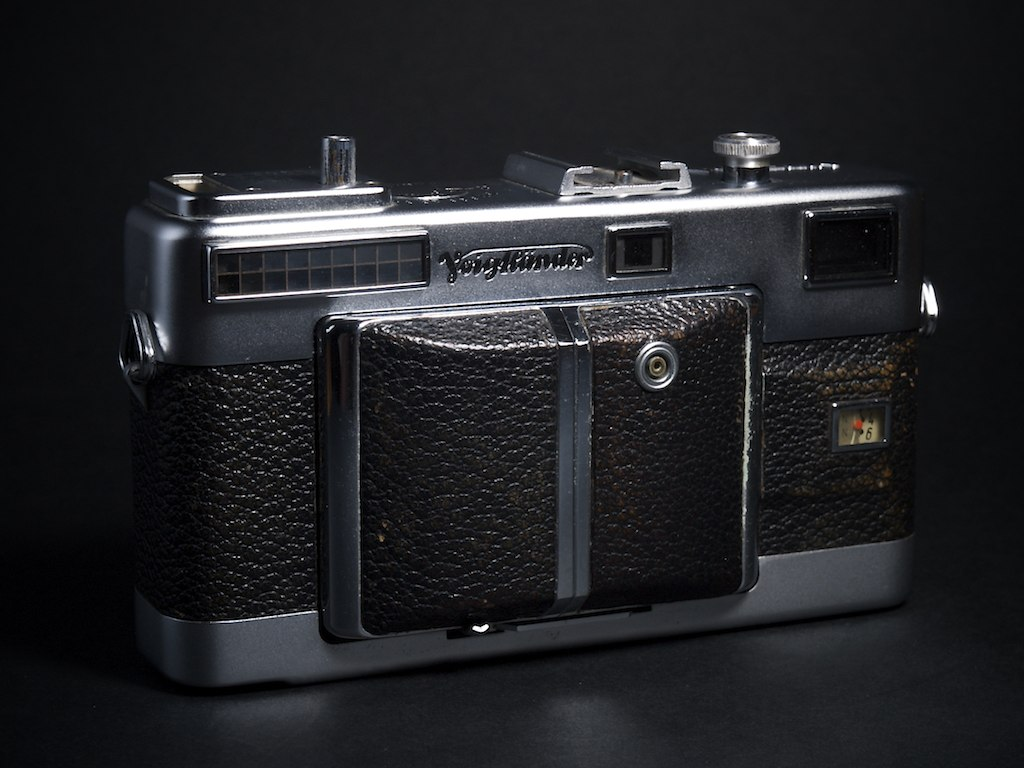
Vitessa L with "barn door" lens cap shut

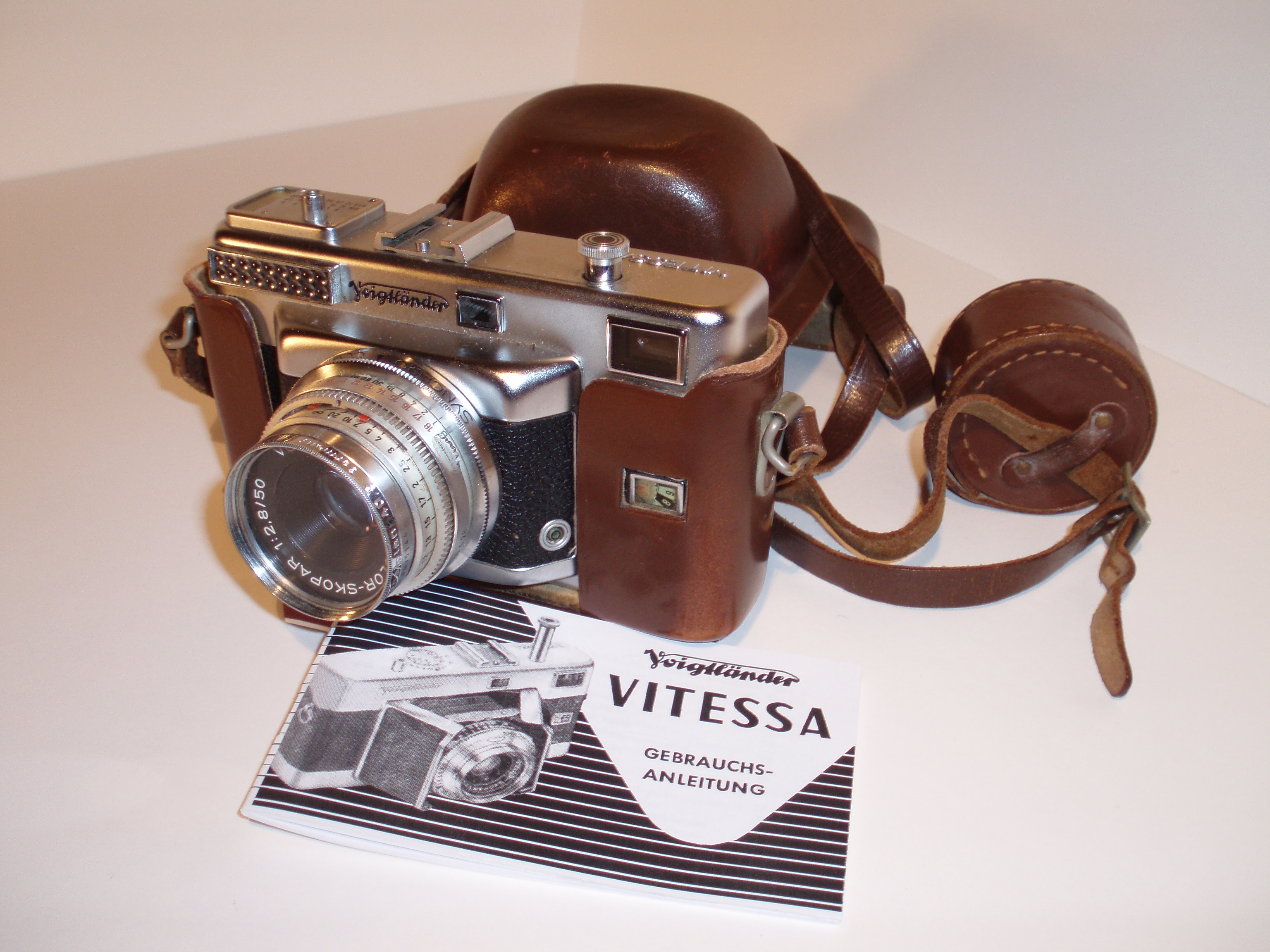
Vitessa T with Color-Skopar lens and leather case

Voigtländer eventually supplemented the original Vitessa A/N with the Vitessa L (1954), which included an external selenium light meter built into the body. Like the A and N, there are several sub-variants of the L, with differences limited mainly to cosmetics.

In 1956, Voigtländer introduced the Vitessa T, which was the first interchangeable lens camera to use the DKL-mount. Compared to prior Vitessa models, the lens mount of the T was not collapsible, making it a bulkier camera. There were four lenses sold by Voigtländer for the Vitessa T; the DKL mount also was equipped on the contemporary Braun Super Colorette and lenses made for the Braun could be mounted on the Vitessa T. In 1958, Voigtländer would reuse the DKL mount for the Bessamatic single-lens reflex camera, but implemented physical differences that left the Vitessa and Bessamatic mutually incompatible.

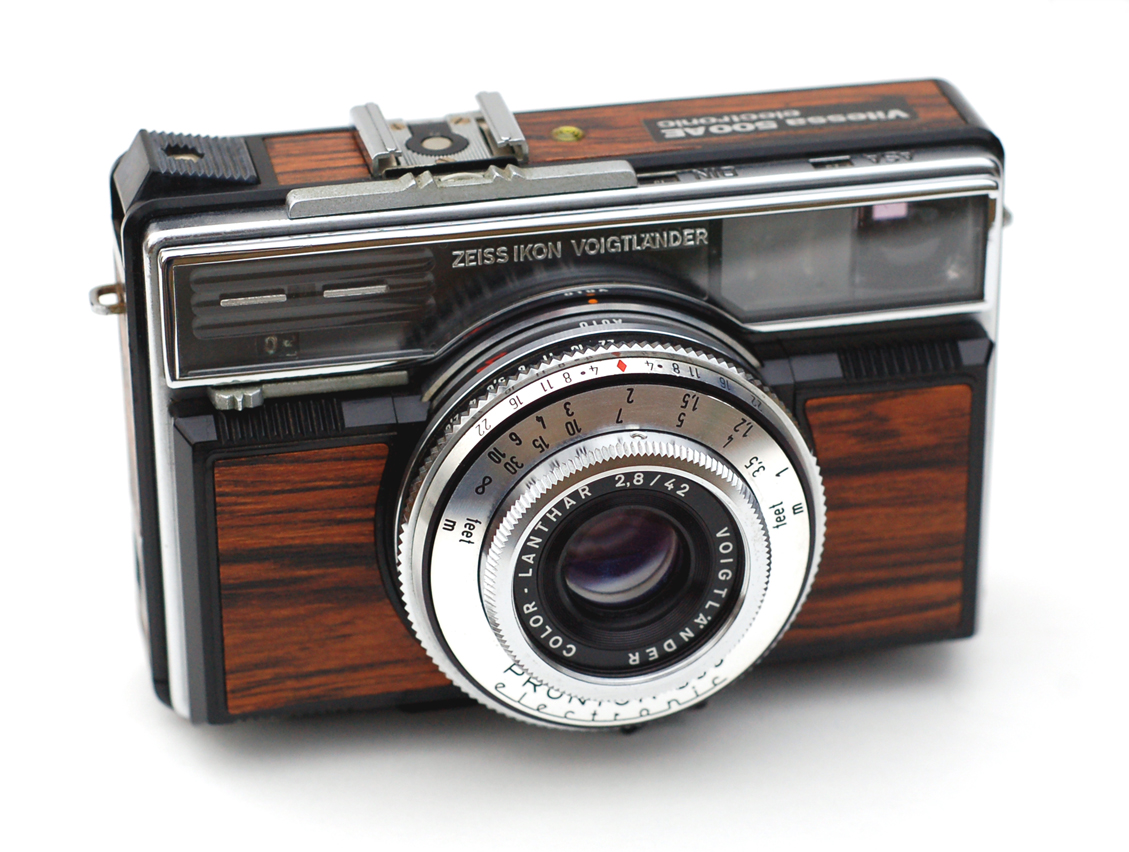
Vitessa 500AE with Color-Lanthar lens

The Zeiss Ikon/Voigtländer (ZIV) Vitessa 500 and Vitessa 1000 revived the Vitessa name in 1966 for a series of fixed-lens compact cameras using 135 film. The 500S, 500L, and 500AE were equipped with a 42 mm f/2.8 Color-Lanthar triplet lens, while the 500SE and 1000SR were equipped with a 40 mm f/2.8 Tessar lens.

At about the same time, ZIV also marketed the Vitessa 126 series using the 126 film (Instamatic) cartridge developed by Kodak to simplify the loading process. The 126 electronic has a Novar 40 mm f/6.3 lens and the 126 CS has a Voigtar 44 mm f/11 lens; both lenses have simple scale focusing. The 126 S has a more sophisticated Color-Lanthar 38 mm f/2.8 lens.

== Lenses ==
The fast Ultron lens was available for each of the fixed-lens models A, N, and L, while two versions of the Tessar-derived Color-Skopar were available for the N and L. Both lens types were designed by Albrecht Tronnier.

Vitessa A/N/L fixed lenses
FL (mm)	Aperture	Name	Construction		Vitessa			Notes
FL (mm)	Aperture	Name	Ele	Grp	A	N	L	Notes
50	f/2	Ultron	6	5	Yes	Yes	Yes	Modified double Gauss lens
50	f/2.8	Color-Skopar	4	3	No	No	Yes	Tessar design
50	f/3.5	Color-Skopar	4	3	No	Yes	Yes	Tessar design

The Vitessa T had four interchangeable lenses that used the DKL mount system. The Color-Skopar design was carried over from the fixed-lens model L, but not the faster Ultron. Lenses for the Vitessa T feature an aperture ring of their own. They are not compatible with Bessamatic lenses.

Vitessa T DKL-mount lenses
FL (mm)	Aperture	Name	Construction		Notes
FL (mm)	Aperture	Name	Ele	Grp	Notes
35	f/3.4	Skoparet	6	5	Retrofocus design
50	f/2.8	Color-Skopar	4	3	Tessar design
100	f/4.8	Dynaret	6	4	Sonnar design
135	f/4	Super-Dynaret	?	?	
