= Prontor-Compur =

Electrical connector used in photography

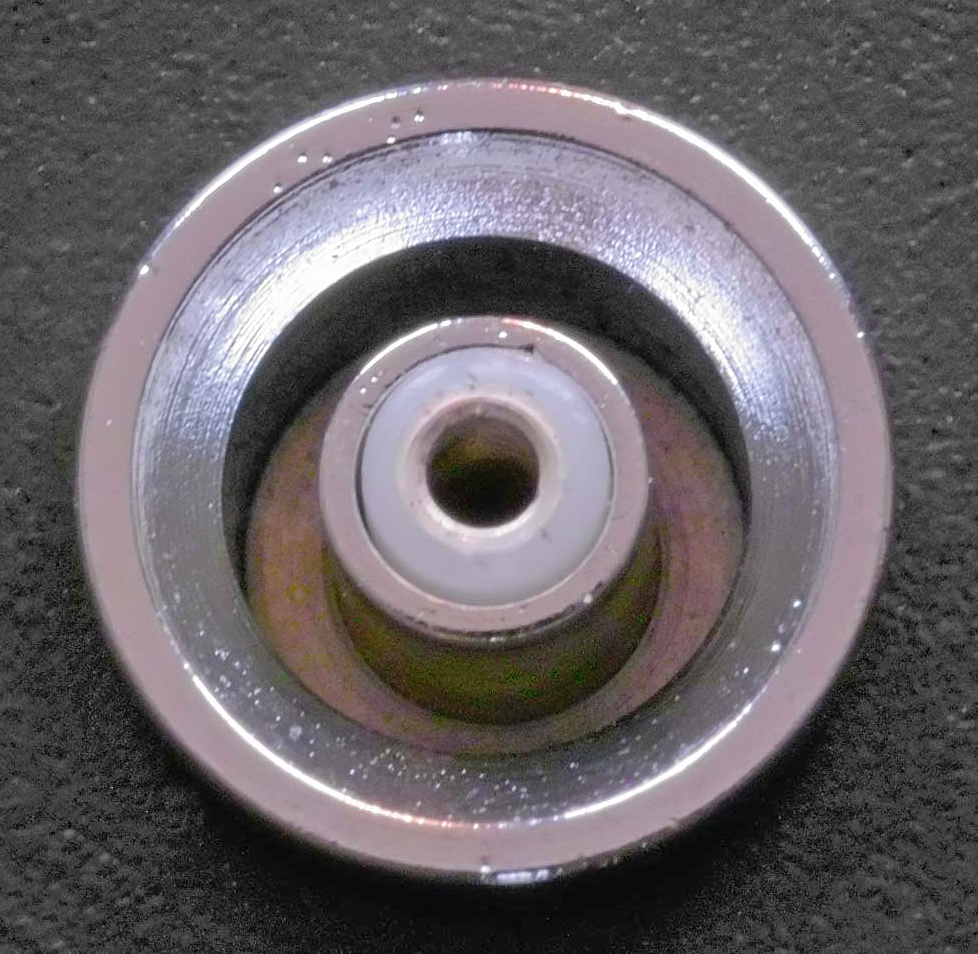
- PC-socket, greatly magnified

General specifications
- Hot pluggable: Yes
- Audio signal: None
- Video signal: None
- Pins: 2

A Prontor-Compur connection (also known as a PC connector, PC terminal, or PC socket) is a standard 3.5 mm (1/8 in) electrical connector (as defined in ISO 519) used in photography to synchronize the shutter to the flash.

== Etymology ==
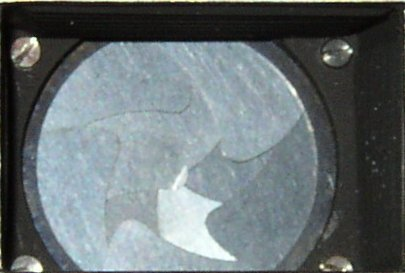
A leaf shutter

"Prontor" has its origins in the Italian word "pronto", meaning ready (and was a leaf shutter made by Alfred Gauthier). "Compur" is derived from the word "compound" (the "Compound" was a long-lived series of leaf shutters made by Friedrich Deckel).

== History ==
The term is derived from brands of widely marketed photographic leaf shutters manufactured from the early 1950s by two distinct, but now defunct German companies. Gauthier (which made the Prontor-S and Prontor SV models, amongst others) and Deckel (the Synchro-Compur model, successor to the Compound model).

Both companies' brands, Prontor (from 1953) and Compur (from 1951), shared a common 1/8"-inch coaxial connector for shutter–flash synchronization. This convergence of design is not as coincidental as it might first appear, as the Zeiss organisation held a significant shareholding in both of these companies prior to the introduction of the shared connector. By the 1950s, Gauthier were manufacturing up to 10,000 Prontor shutters daily.

The Gauthier company's essence lives on as Prontor GmbH, which is a wholly owned subsidiary of VTC Industrieholding GmbH. The Deckel company went bankrupt in 1994.
