= Rolleicord =

Medium-format twin lens reflex camera

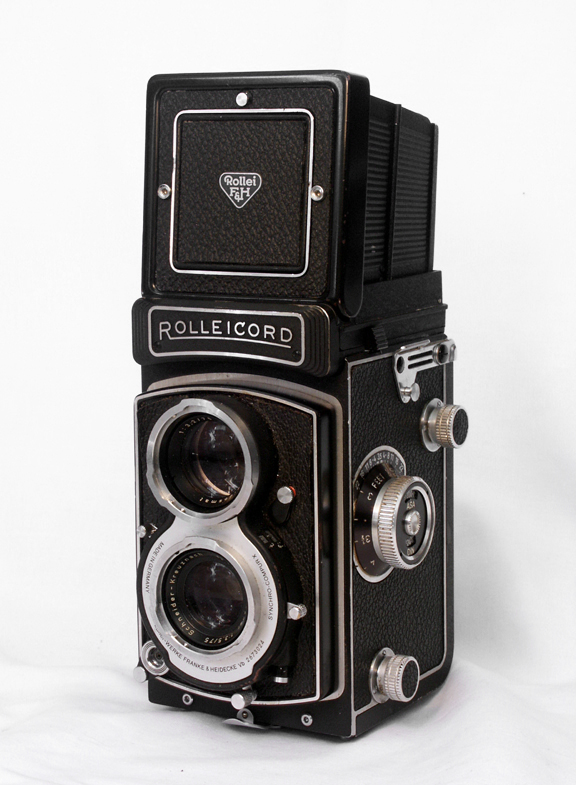
Rolleicord Vb Type 2 "White Face," the last Rolleicord

The Rolleicord is a medium-format twin lens reflex camera made by Franke & Heidecke (Rollei) between 1933 and 1976. It was a simpler, less expensive version of the high-end Rolleiflex TLR, aimed at amateur photographers who wanted a high-quality camera but could not afford the expensive Rolleiflex. Several models of Rolleicord were made; the later models generally had more advanced features and tend to be valued higher in today's market.

== History ==
The first Rolleicord, introduced in November 1933, was the Rolleicord I. This camera was a simplified version of the Standard Rolleiflex, with a cheaper 75mm Zeiss Triotar lens and a simplified film advance mechanism using a knob instead of the crank found on the Rolleiflex. The Rolleicord I was available either with a plain leatherette covering or elaborately patterned metal faceplates. The latter variant is referred to as the "Art Deco" Rolleicord.

The models that have the letters DRP on the left and to the right DRGM on the front of the camera means that they were made before World War II, because DRP means 'Deutsches Reichspatent' (German Reich patent) and DRGM means 'Deutsches Reichs-Gebrauchsmuster' (roughly equivalent to a design copyright). In post WW2 models you will find DBP and DBGM. They switched from "Reichs" to "Bundes" (German Federal Patent).

Later models incorporated improved designs for the taking lens, a 4-element Schneider Kreuznach Xenar, which also appeared on the Rolleiflex cameras. However, while the Rolleiflex was also available with an f/2.8 lens, the Rolleicord was never offered with a larger aperture than f/3.5, thus ensuring its pedigree as an "amateur" camera.

In the early 1960s, Rollei introduced the magic line, which added a light meter and autoexposure capability to the Rolleicord line.

An accessory, known as a Rolleikin kit, was available for the Rolleicord and the Rolleiflex, which allowed those cameras to accept 135 film (35 mm).

== List of models ==
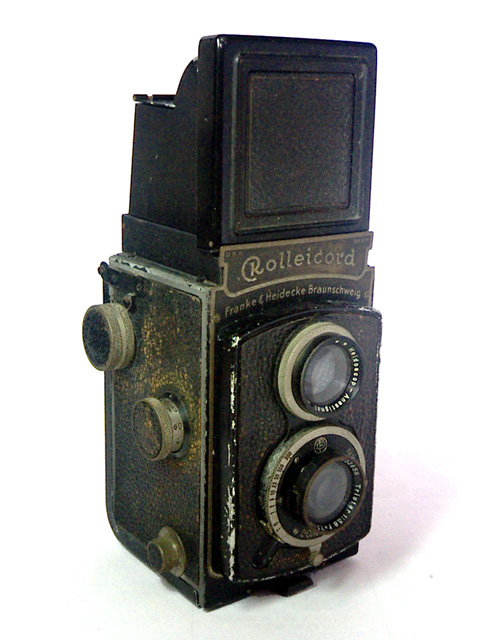
I ("leatherette")

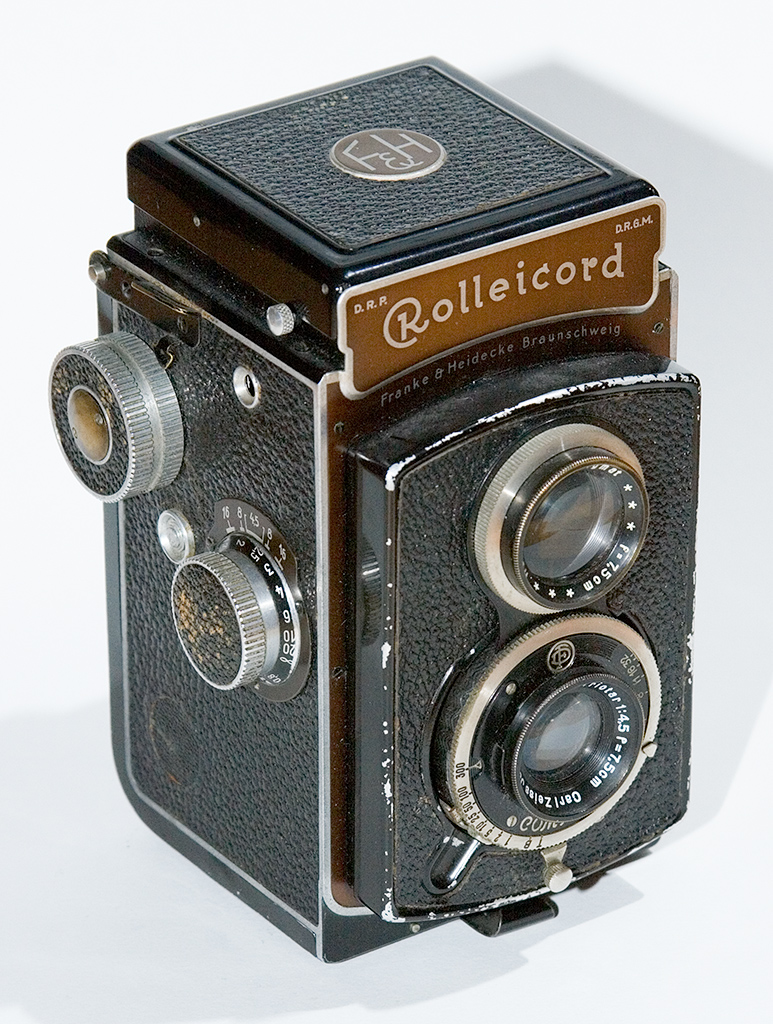
II (Model 1)

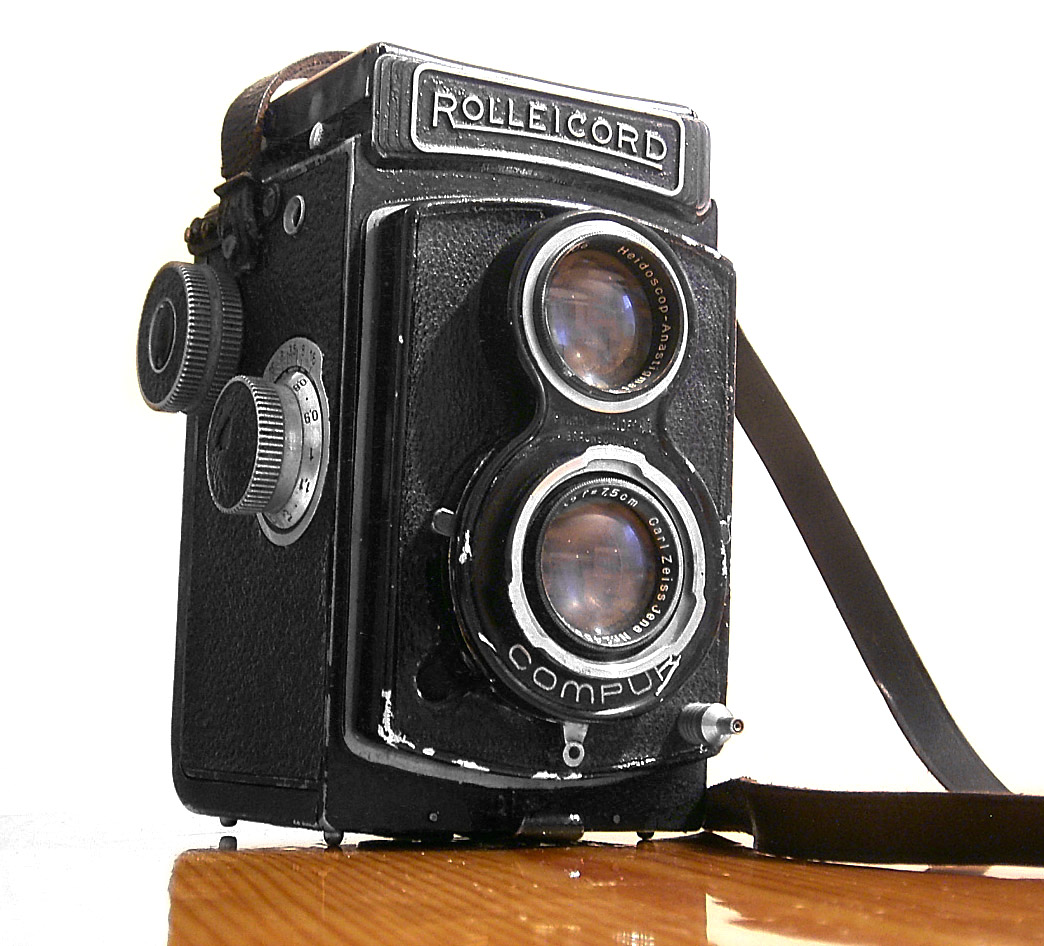
IIc (Model 4)

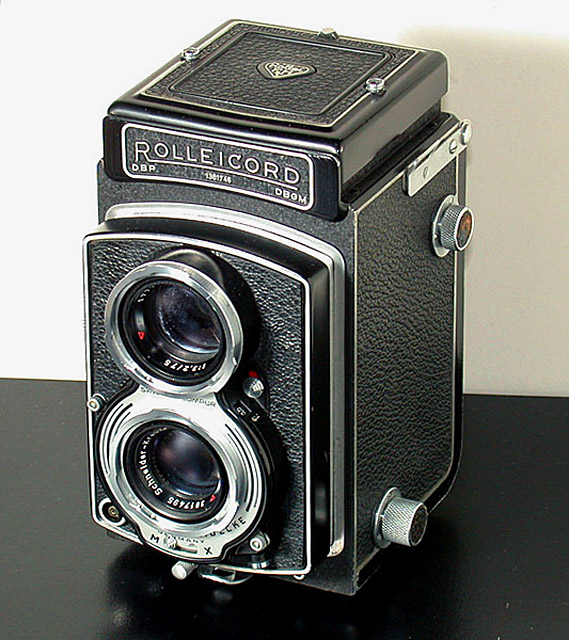
IV

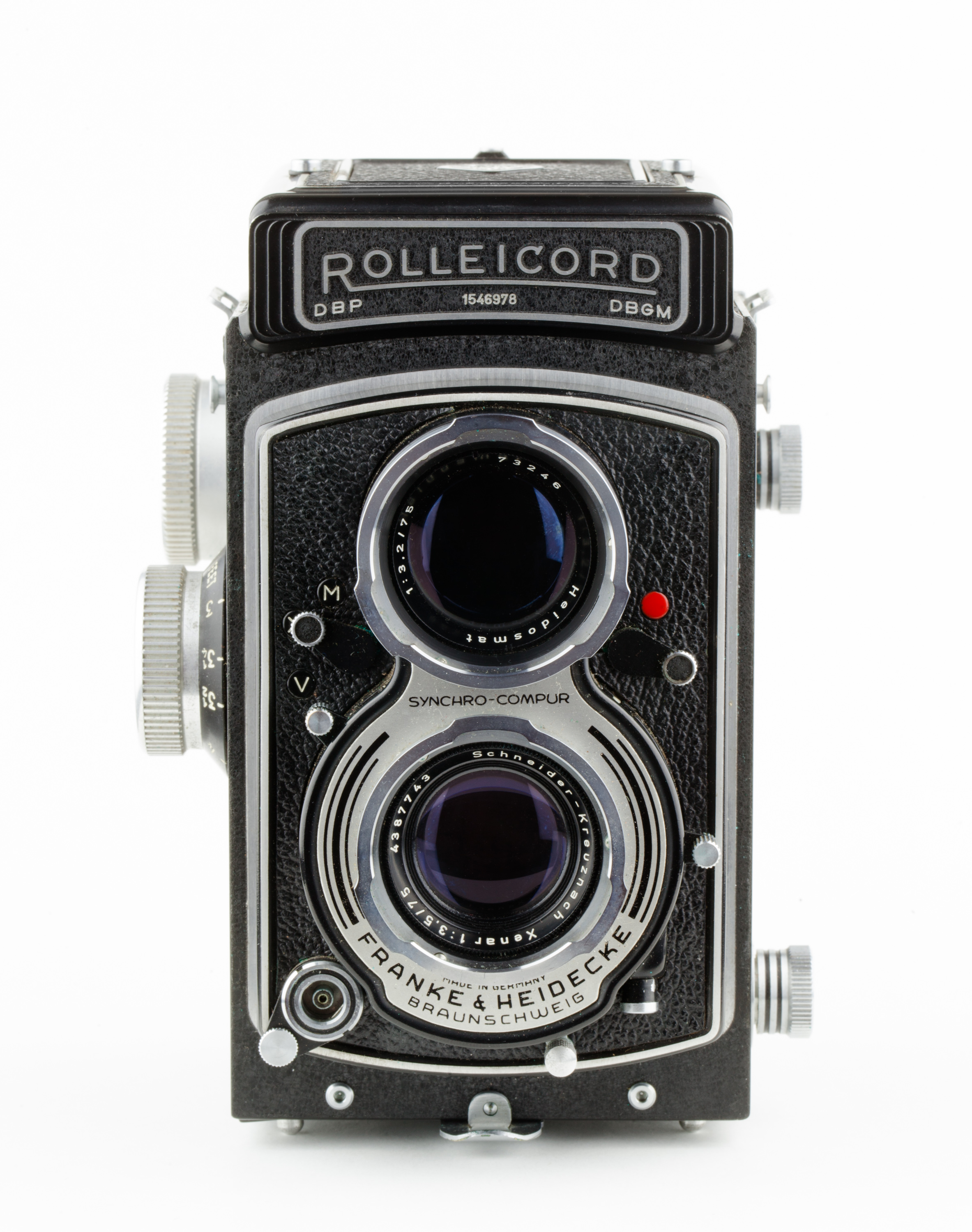
V, 1955

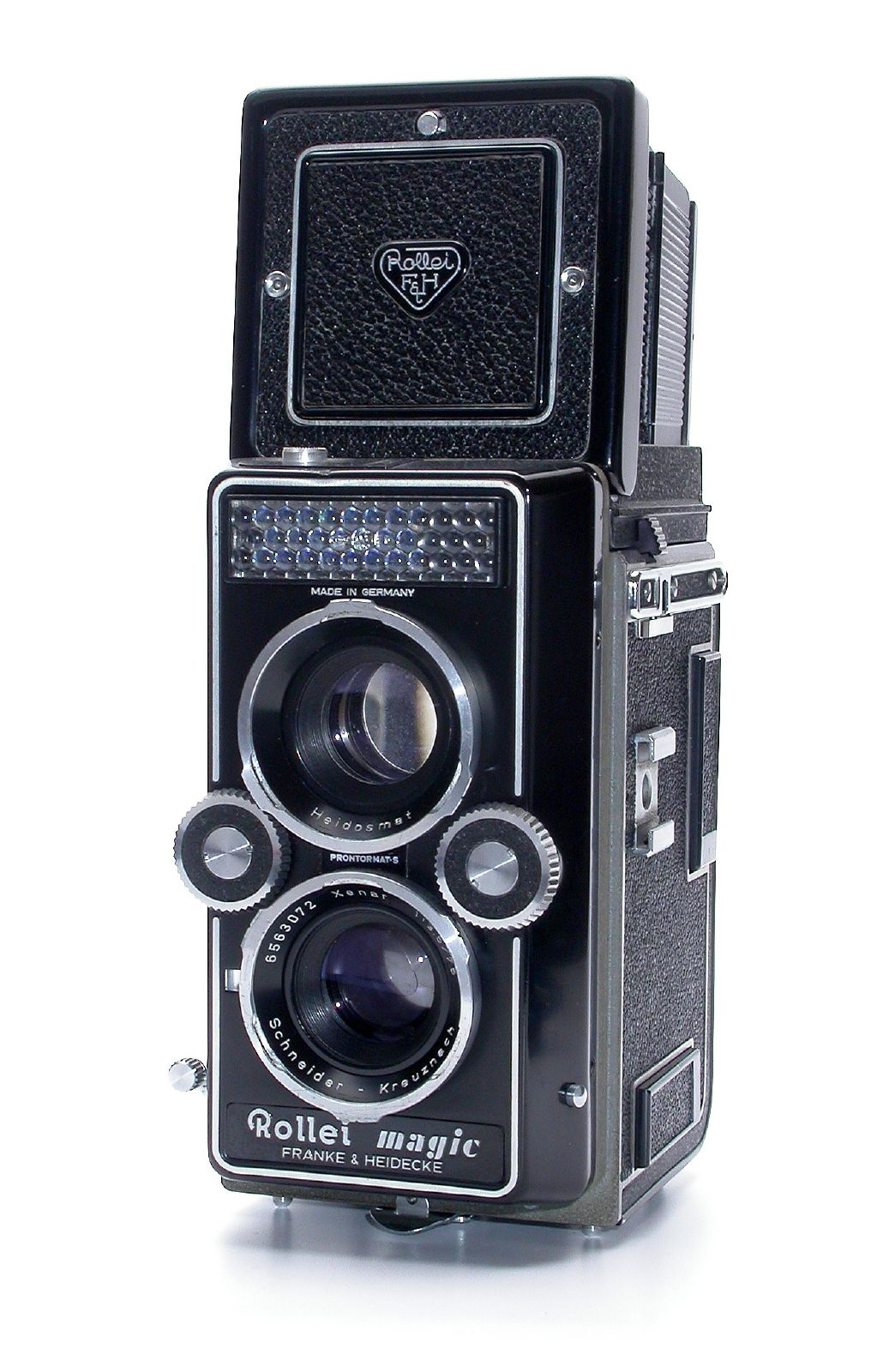
magic I

Rolleicord TLR timeline
Model	1930s										1940s										1950s										1960s										1970s									
Model	0	1	2	3	4	5	6	7	8	9	0	1	2	3	4	5	6	7	8	9	0	1	2	3	4	5	6	7	8	9	0	1	2	3	4	5	6	7	8	9	0	1	2	3	4	5	6	7	8	9
I				I				Ia																																										
II							II		IIb									IId																																
II								IIa		IIc																																								
II																				IIe																														
III/IV/V																					III				V																									
III/IV/V																								IV				Va					Vb																	
magic																															magic																			

Viewfinder lenses were of Heidoskop, Heidoscop or Heidosmat type, whereas various Carl Zeiss Jena Triotar or Schneider Xenar lenses were used as taking lenses. Post-war Rolleicord cameras generally are equipped with faster shutter speeds and electronic flash synchronization (X-sync).

Rolleicord cameras
Camera		Dates		Taking lens (FL=75 mm)		Viewing lens (FL=75 mm)		Shutter		Notes
Name	Model	Intro.	Disc.	Name	Ap.	Name	Ap.	Name	Speeds	Notes
I ("Art Deco")	Model 1	Nov 1933	Mar 1936	Zeiss Triotar	f/4.5	Heidosmat Anastigmat	f/4	Compur C00	1-1/300 + B, T	
I ("leatherette")	K3-511	Dec 1934	Aug 1936	Zeiss Triotar	f/3.8	Heidosmat Anastigmat	f/4	Compur C00	1-1/300 + B, T	
Ia (Model 1)	K3-520	Mar 1936	May 1937	Zeiss Triotar	f/4.5	Heidosmat Anastigmat	f/4	Compur C00	1-1/300 + B, T	
II (Model 1)	K3	Mar 1936	Aug 1937	Zeiss Triotar	f/3.5	Anastigmat	f/3.2	Compur C00	1-1/300 + B, T	
Ia (Model 2)	K3-530	May 1937	Jan 1938	Zeiss Triotar	f/4.5	Heidosmat Anastigmat	f/4	Compur C00	1-1/300 + B, T	
IIa (Model 2)	K3	Jun 1937	Jan 1938	Zeiss Triotar	f/3.5	Heidosmat	f/3.2	Compur C00	1-1/300 + B, T	
Ia (Model 3)	K3-531	Feb 1938	Oct 1947	Zeiss Triotar	f/4.5	Heidosmat Anastigmat	f/4	Compur C00	1-1/300 + B, T	
IIb (Model 3)	K3-541	Feb 1938	Jan 1939	Zeiss Triotar	f/3.5	Anastigmat	f/3.2	Compur C00	1-1/300 + B, T	
IIc (Model 4)	K3-542	Feb 1939	Oct 1949	Zeiss Triotar	f/3.5	Anastigmat	f/3.2	Compur C00	1-1/300 + B, T	
IId (Model 5)	K3-542	Jan 1947	Dec 1947	Zeiss Triotar	f/3.5	Heidosmat	f/3.2	Compur Rapid C00	1-1/500 + B, T	
IId (Model 5)	K3-542	Dec 1947	Jun 1949	Schneider Xenar	f/4.5	Schneider Xenar	f/3.5	Compur Rapid C00	1-1/500 + B, T	
IId (Model 5)	K3-542	Jul 1949	Oct 1950	Schneider Xenar	f/3.5	Schneider Xenar	f/3.2	Compur Rapid C00	1-1/500 + B, T	
IIe (Model 6)	K3-542	Nov 1949	Sep 1950	Zeiss Triotar	f/3.5	Heidosmat	f/3.2	Compur Rapid C00	1-1/500 + B, T; X-sync	
IIe (Model 6)	K3-542	Nov 1949	Sep 1950	Schneider Xenar	f/3.5	Schneider Xenar	f/3.2	Compur Rapid C00	1-1/500 + B, T; X-sync	
III	K3B	Nov 1950	Jul 1953	Schneider Xenar	f/3.5	Schneider or Zeiss Heidosmat	f/3.2	Compur Rapid X	1-1/500 + B, T; X-sync	
IV	K3D	Aug 1953	Sep 1954	Schneider Xenar	f/3.5	Schneider or Zeiss Heidosmat	f/3.2	Synchro Compur MX	1-1/500 + B; X-sync	
V	K3C	Oct 1954	Mar 1957	Schneider Xenar	f/3.5	Schneider or Zeiss Heidosmat	f/3.2	Synchro Compur MX	1-1/500 + B; X-sync	
Va	K3E Type 1	Apr 1957	Jan 1961	Schneider Xenar	f/3.5	Schneider Heidosmat	f/3.2	Synchro Compur MXV	1-1/500 + B; X-sync	
Vb	K3Vb Type 1	Apr 1962	1966	Schneider Xenar	f/3.5	Schneider Heidosmat	f/3.2	Synchro Compur MXV	1-1/500 + B; X-sync	
Vb	K3Vb Type 2	1966	Jan 1977	Schneider Xenar	f/3.5	Schneider Heidosmat	f/3.2	Synchro Compur MX	1-1/500 + B; X-sync	

Rollei magic cameras
Camera		Dates		Taking lens (FL=75 mm)		Viewing lens (FL=75 mm)		Shutter		Notes
Name	Model	Intro.	Disc.	Name	Ap.	Name	Ap.	Name	Speeds	Notes
I	K9	Oct 1960	Mar 1962	Schneider Xenar	f/3.5	Heidosmat	f/3.5	Prontomat S	1/30-1/300 + B; X-sync	Autoexposure only
II	K9	Mar 1962	Sep 1968	Schneider Xenar	f/3.5	Heidosmat	f/3.5	Prontomat S	1/30-1/500 + B; X-sync	Adds manual exposure controls
