= Flash synchronization =

Synchronizing the firing of a photographic flash

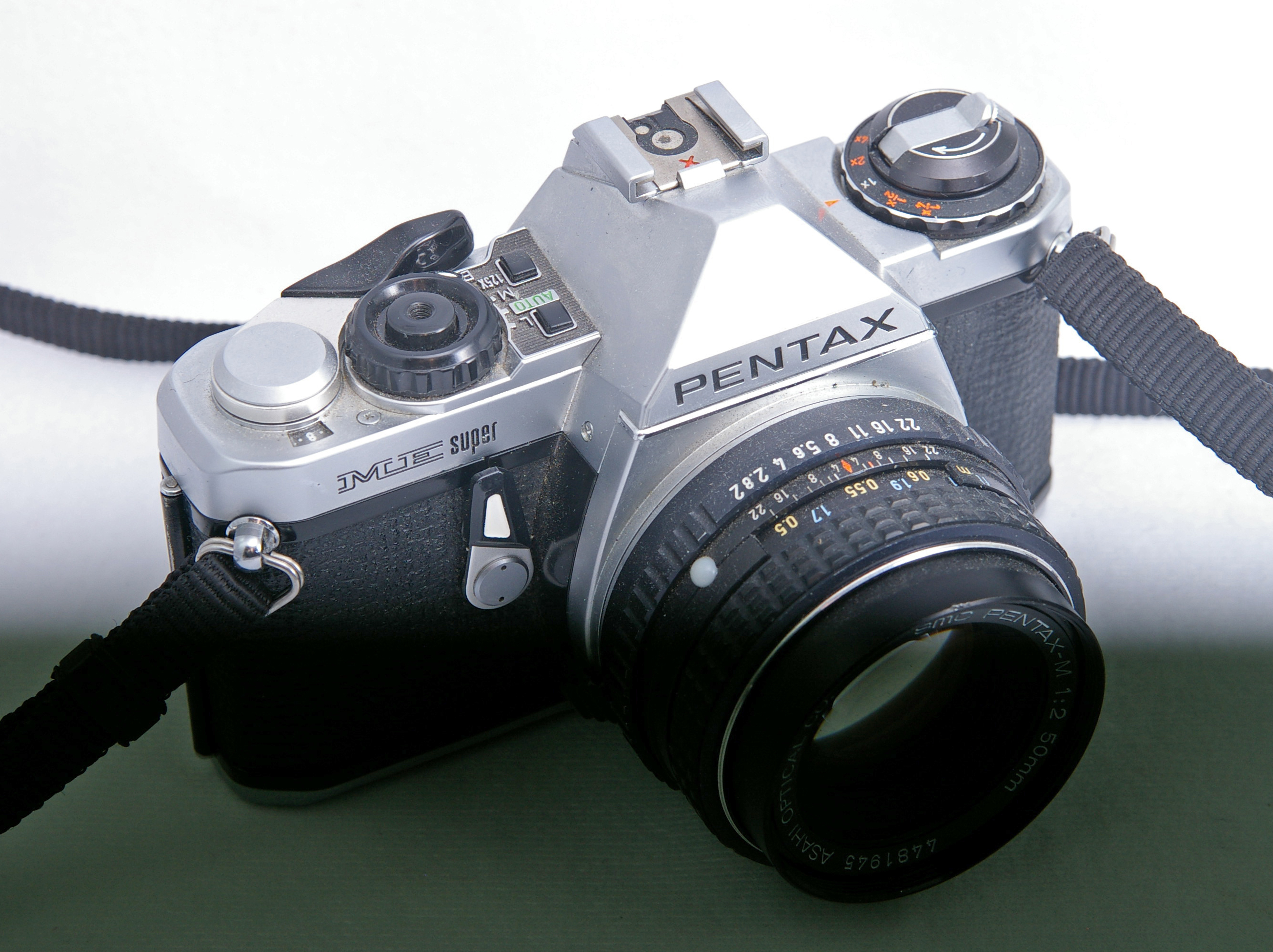
An example of improper synch. Either the flash is firing too late or the shutter speed is too fast (shutter moving vertically). Note the different exposure levels.

In photography, flash synchronization or flash sync is the synchronizing the firing of a photographic flash with the opening of the shutter admitting light to photographic film or electronic image sensor.

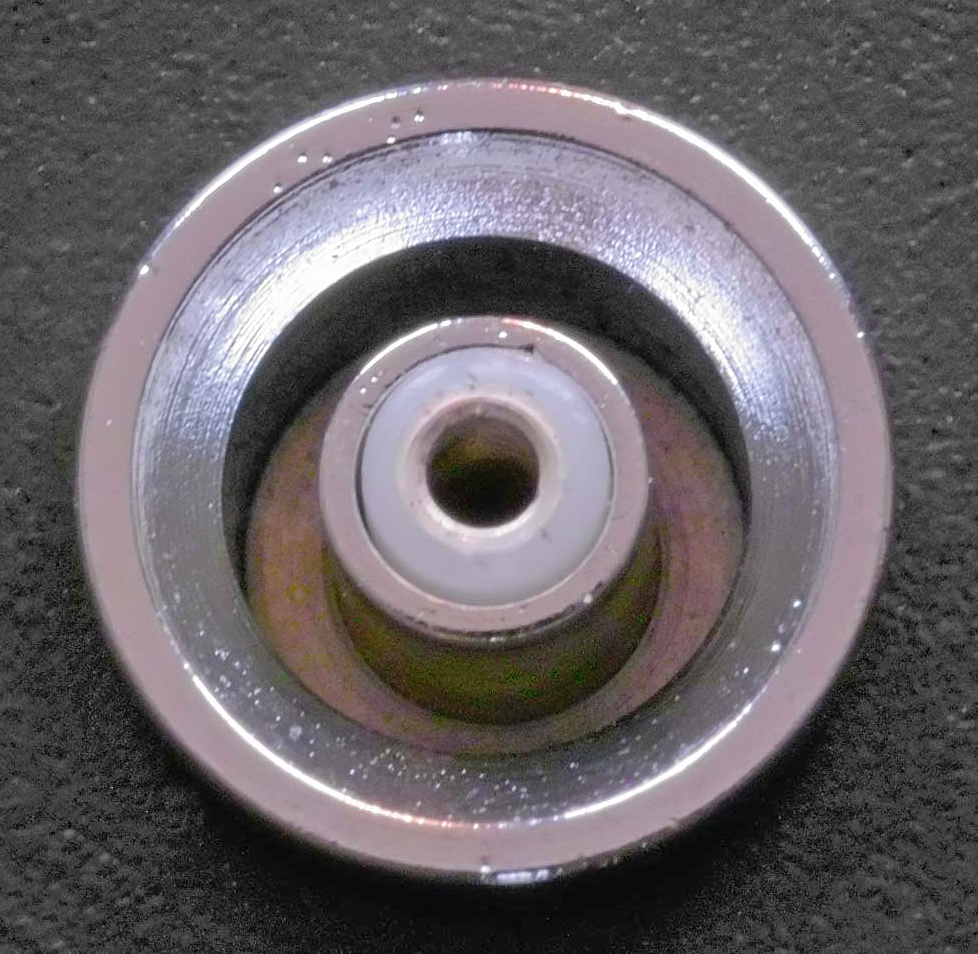
PC-socket

In cameras with mechanical (clockwork) shutters synchronization is supported by an electrical contact within the shutter mechanism, which closes the circuit at the appropriate moment in the shutter opening process. In electronic digital cameras, the mechanism is usually a programmable electronic timing circuit, which may, in some cameras, take input from a mechanical shutter contact. The flash is connected electrically to the camera either by a cable with a standardized coaxial PC (for Prontor/Compur) 3.5 mm (1/8 in) connector (as defined in ISO 519), or via contacts in an accessory mount (hot shoe) bracket.

Faster shutter speeds are often better when there is significant ambient illumination, and flash is used to flash fill subjects that are backlit without motion blur, or to increase depth of field by using a small aperture. In another creative use, the photographer of a moving subject may deliberately combine a slow shutter speed with flash exposure in order to record motion blur of the ambient-lit regions of the image superimposed on the flash-lit regions.

== X sync ==
The photometric output of the GE Synchro-Press No. 11 flashbulb is shown here. Like all "M" bulbs, its peak output was defined as occurring 20 milliseconds after applying electrical current. The No. 11 had a peak luminous flux of 1.8 million lumens. Its rated luminous energy, Q_{v} of 23,000 lumen⋅seconds is the shaded area to the right of the definitional shutter opening point (^{1}/_{800}th of a second before the point of peak luminous flux).

X-sync (for xenon sync) is the simplest mode; the xenon flash is fired at the instant the shutter is fully open. Electronic flash equipment produces a very short flash. X sync is a mode designed for use with electronic flash. In this mode, the timing of the contacts coincides exactly with the full opening of the shutter, since xenon flashes respond almost instantly.

Due to their construction, focal plane shutters, as used on most single-lens reflex cameras (SLRs), only allow normal xenon flash units to be used at shutter speeds slow enough that the entire shutter is open at once, typically at shutter speeds of 1/60 or slower, although some modern cameras may have an X-sync speed as high as 1/500 (e.g. Nikon's D40 DSLRs). Special electronic flash units for focal-plane shutters fire several times as the slit moves across the film. Electronic shutters used in some digital cameras do not have this limitation and may allow a very high X-sync speed.

== S, M, ME, F, FP, and V sync ==
Cameras designed for use with flash bulbs generally had one or more of S (slow) sync, M (medium) sync, F (fast) sync, or FP/FPX (flat peak) sync, designed for use with corresponding bulb types. These sync modes close the contacts a few milliseconds before the shutter is open, to give the flashbulb time to reach peak brightness before exposing the film. Class M bulbs reach their peak illumination 20 milliseconds after ignition, and class F lamps reach their peak at approximately 5 milliseconds.

FP sync was used with FP (flat-peak) flash bulbs designed specifically for use with focal-plane shutters. In these shutters, although each part of the film is exposed for the rated exposure time, the film is exposed by a slit which moves across the film in a time (the "X-sync speed") of the order of 1/100"; although the exposure of each part of the film may be 1/2000", the last part of the film is exposed later by the X-sync time than the first part, and a brief flash will illuminate only a strip of film. FP bulbs burned close to full brightness for the full X-sync time, giving time for the moving slit to expose the whole frame with the light of the flash.

The Nikon F offered FP, M, and ME bulb synchronizations, in addition to the X sync.

The Friedrich Deckel Synchro-Compur leaf shutter of the Braun Paxette Reflex offered V, X, and M flash synchronization, whereby V (German: "Vorlauf") was used in conjunction with self-timer.

== High-speed sync (HSS) ==
Some modern xenon flash units have the ability to produce a longer-duration flash to permit flash synchronization at shorter shutter speeds, therefore called high-speed sync (HSS). Instead of delivering one burst of light, the units deliver several smaller bursts over a time interval as short as 1/125 of a second. This allows light to be delivered to the entire area of the film or image sensor even though the shutter is never fully open at any moment, similar to FP sync.

== Rear-curtain sync ==
Many digital SLRs include an option to fire the flash just before the closing of the shutter, so that moving objects will show a streak where they came from and a sharp image where they were at the end of the exposure—useful for moving objects to convey a sense of speed. This mode is called rear-curtain sync or 2nd-curtain sync.

== See also ==
- Guide number
- Through-the-lens metering (TTL)
