= Compound shutter =

Type of camera shutter

The Compound shutter is a mechanical leaf shutter for photographic cameras introduced in the late 19th century, usually used between lens components. It was produced by Friedrich Deckel AG, of Munich, Germany. A typical Compound shutter may have settings for T (Time, shutter remains open until the shutter release is pressed again), B (Bulb, shutter remains open as long as the release is held down), and exposure times from 1 second down to 1/100 or less.

Unlike later mechanical shutters such as the Compur which use a clockwork mechanism, shutter timing is achieved by releasing air from a small cylinder, typically mounted horizontally at the top of the shutter, through a small aperture. A cam turned by the shutter speed dial positions a spring-loaded piston in the cylinder to provide the correct distance of travel for the required exposure duration. When the shutter release is pressed the shutter opens, and air in the cylinder is gradually released, letting the piston move; it closes the shutter when it reaches the end of its travel. The piston travels for a very short distance at the shortest exposure settings, making accuracy very sensitive to the precise manufacturing of the cam; lower speeds are more reliably accurate.

Compound shutters were manufactured for 65 years, the last one being made in 1970.
