= Friedrich Deckel =

German photographic company

Friedrich Deckel GmbH, also known as F. Deckel, was a German company founded by Friedrich Deckel and Christian Bruns in Munich as Bruns & Deckel in 1903. Its most famous product is the Compur line of leaf shutters used on many photographic lenses starting from 1911. Bruns and Deckel previously had worked together at C. A. Steinheil & Söhne; Bruns was an inventor responsible for developing leaf shutters while Deckel was a laboratory mechanic.

== Corporate history ==
By 1910, Zeiss had acquired a 16.8% stake in F. Deckel. Zeiss also owned a significant portion of competitor Alfred Gauthier Calmbach (AGC), which was later renamed Prontor after its competing leaf shutter.

Taking advantage of their growing knowledge of factory production methods and machinery, by about 1920 Deckel started producing "extra" machines for sale to the trade, most notably the versatile FP line of industrial milling machines. During World War II, photographic equipment production was paused and F. Deckel made fuel pumps for BMW airplane engines. By the end of the war, Deckel was also said to have produced a total of some 4100 examples of their FP1 milling machine for use in the war effort.

In 1958, Carl Zeiss AG purchased F. Deckel outright and in 1976 closed down the Compur factor in Munich, consolidating production with Prontor at Calmbach. Leaf shutter production continued after the two companies were merged in 1984 until 2002. A portion of the company, responsible for gas monitors, survives as Compur Monitors GmbH. Their FP3 milling machine remained in production until the late years of the 20th Century. Deckel's popular, if expensive, line of industrial tool and cutter grinders remain available for sale under the brand ISOG, a division of Precision Surfacing Solutions.

== Leaf shutter development ==
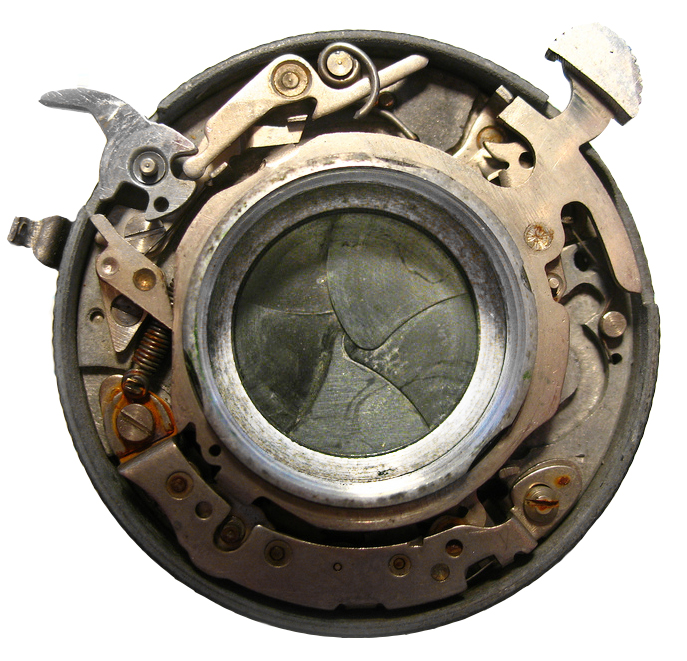
Clockwork mechanism within a Compur-Rapid leaf shutter; cocking lever at upper left and tripping lever at upper right; lever below cocking lever selects aperture.

Bruns designed Steinheil's first leaf shutter in 1899, followed by an updated version using a leather brake to control shutter speeds.

While at Bruns & Deckel, Bruns developed the Compound leaf shutter in 1905, which had a pneumatic escapement for slow speeds. After Bruns left the company shortly thereafter, it was renamed to F. Deckel; Bruns continued to develop shutters and replaced the pneumatic cylinder with a clockwork escapement in 1910, naming the new shutter Compur as a portmanteau of Compound (from the earlier shutter design) and Uhrwerk (referring to the clockwork mechanism). A consortium of photographic companies, including Carl Zeiss AG, Bausch & Lomb (25% of which was owned by Zeiss), and AGC was formed in 1910 to acquire Bruns's Compur patent, which was provided to Deckel, who produced Compur shutters under license starting in 1911. Zeiss owned significant stakes in both Deckel and Gauthier. The earliest shutters are marked with D.R.P. (Deutsches Reichs-Patent) 258646 D.R.G.M. (Deutsches Reich Gebrauchsmuster) for the original patent.

Leaf shutters are provided in standardized sizes. Compur shutters were marketed with smaller lenses (sizes #00 to #3), while Compound shutters continued to be provided for larger sizes (#4 and #5).

Compur shutter dimensions
Size Dimension	#00	#0	#1	#2	#3
Body diameter	45.2 mm (1.78 in)	58 mm (2.3 in)	70.5 mm (2.78 in)	80.5 mm (3.17 in)	
Front lens thread	M22.5-0.5	M29.5-0.5	M40-0.75	M45.75-0.75	M58-0.75
Rear lens thread	M22.5-0.5	M29.5-0.5	M36-0.75	M45.75-0.75	M58-0.75
Depth	16 mm (0.63 in)	20 mm (0.79 in)		26.5 mm (1.04 in)	
Front to iris	9.3 mm (0.37 in)	10.2 mm (0.40 in)	10.75 mm (0.423 in)	14.5 mm (0.57 in)	31.5 mm (1.24 in)
Mount flange thread	M25.0-0.5	M32.5-0.5	M39-0.75	M50-0.9	M62-0.75
Lens board hole diameter	26.3 mm (1.04 in)	34.6 mm (1.36 in)	41.6 mm (1.64 in)	52.5 mm (2.07 in)	65 mm (2.6 in)
Maximum iris diameter	17.4 mm (0.69 in)	24 mm (0.94 in)	30 mm (1.2 in)	35 mm (1.4 in)	45 mm (1.8 in)

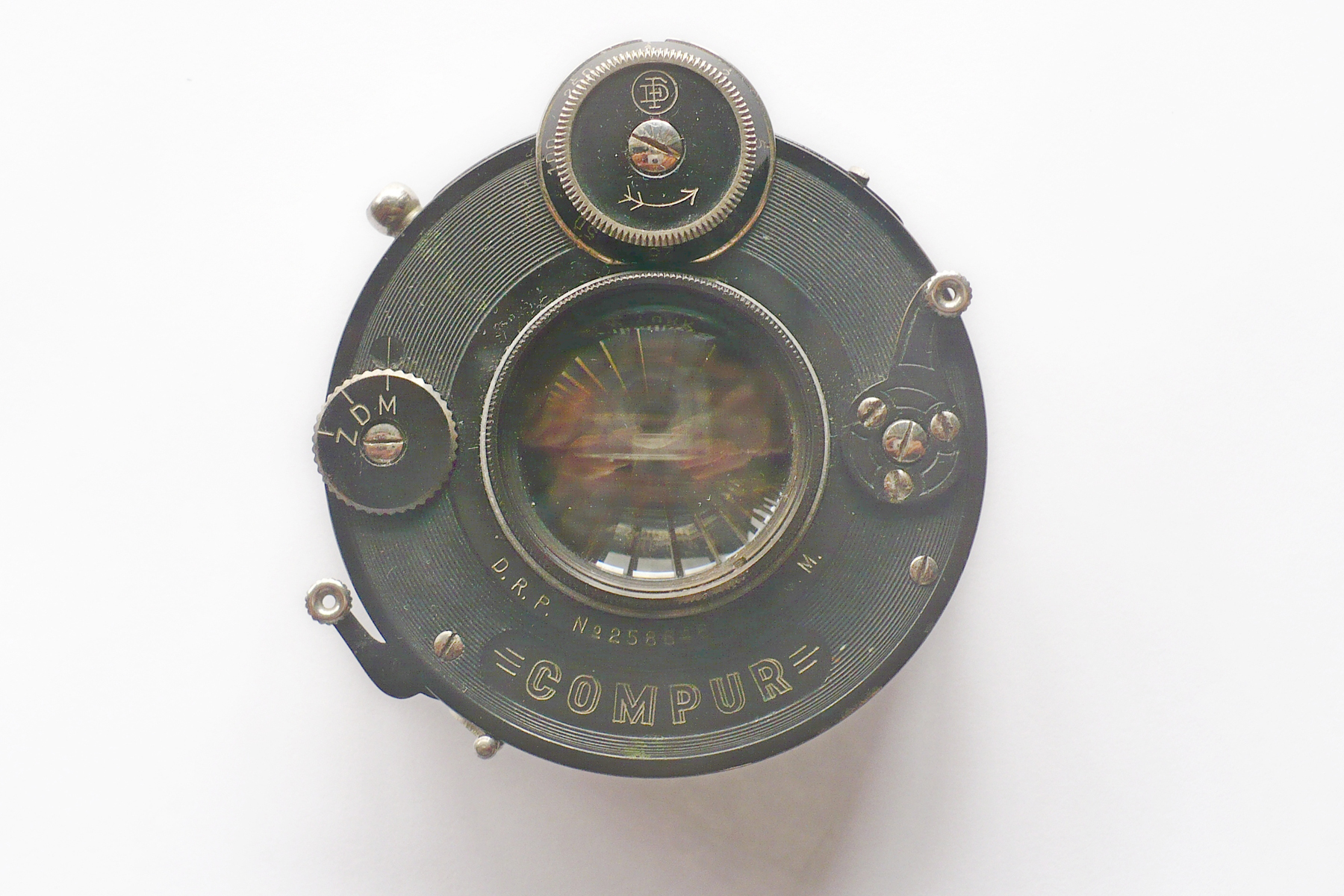
Early Compur shutters used a dial at the 12 o'clock position to set the shutter speed; later versions used a ring coaxial with the lens.

As introduced, the Compur leaf shutter used a dial to set shutter speeds; the early dial-set versions were succeeded by the rim-set version in 1927, which moved the shutter speed control to the outer rim of the shutter. A self-timer mechanism was added in 1928, which was labelled Compur S.

The Compur leaf shutter initially provided speeds of up to 1/250 sec; the later models (denoted by Compur-Rapid) extended the fastest shutter speed to 1/500 (#00) and 1/400 (#0) in 1935. AGC released the similar Prontor leaf shutter design in 1935. The fastest speed should be selected prior to cocking the shutter, as a stiff secondary spring is engaged with the fastest speeds; other speeds may be selected after the shutter is cocked. In addition, the self-timer cannot be used with the fastest shutter speed. Early versions use three leaf blades, while Compur-Rapid versions used five. Flash synchronization was added via a coaxial PC terminal on the rim of the shutter in 1951, which bore the Synchro-Compur branding. Synchro-Compur shutters have an additional lever painted green, which allows the user to select electronic flash synchronization ("X") or flashbulb sync ("M"). Some Compur shutters have a trailing -P, indicating these shutters offer "press to focus" functionality. A separate button is provided that allows the photographer to open the shutter leaves to check focus on the ground glass without changing the shutter speed setting or tripping the shutter.

In the early 1970s, Deckel introduced electronically controlled shutters, branded as Compur-electronic. The 4.5 V PX21 battery required to operate these shutters is now out of production.

== Exposure value ==
F. Deckel developed the exposure value (EV) scale, also known as the Light Value Scale, which is a single number that measures scene illumination on a base-2 logarithmic scale. Each EV corresponds to several combinations of shutter speed and aperture settings that provide the proper exposure for the illumination of the scene. The EV scale was first used on Synchro-Compur shutters displayed at Photokina 1954.

== Deckel-mount lenses ==
Deckel-mount lenses

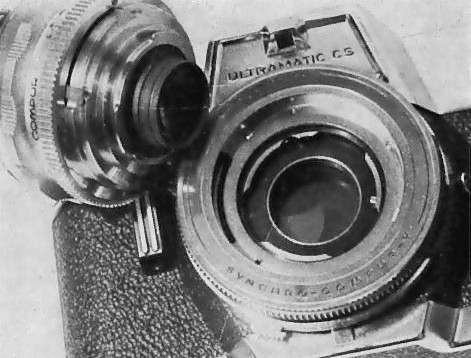
Voigtländer Ultramatic and dismounted lens

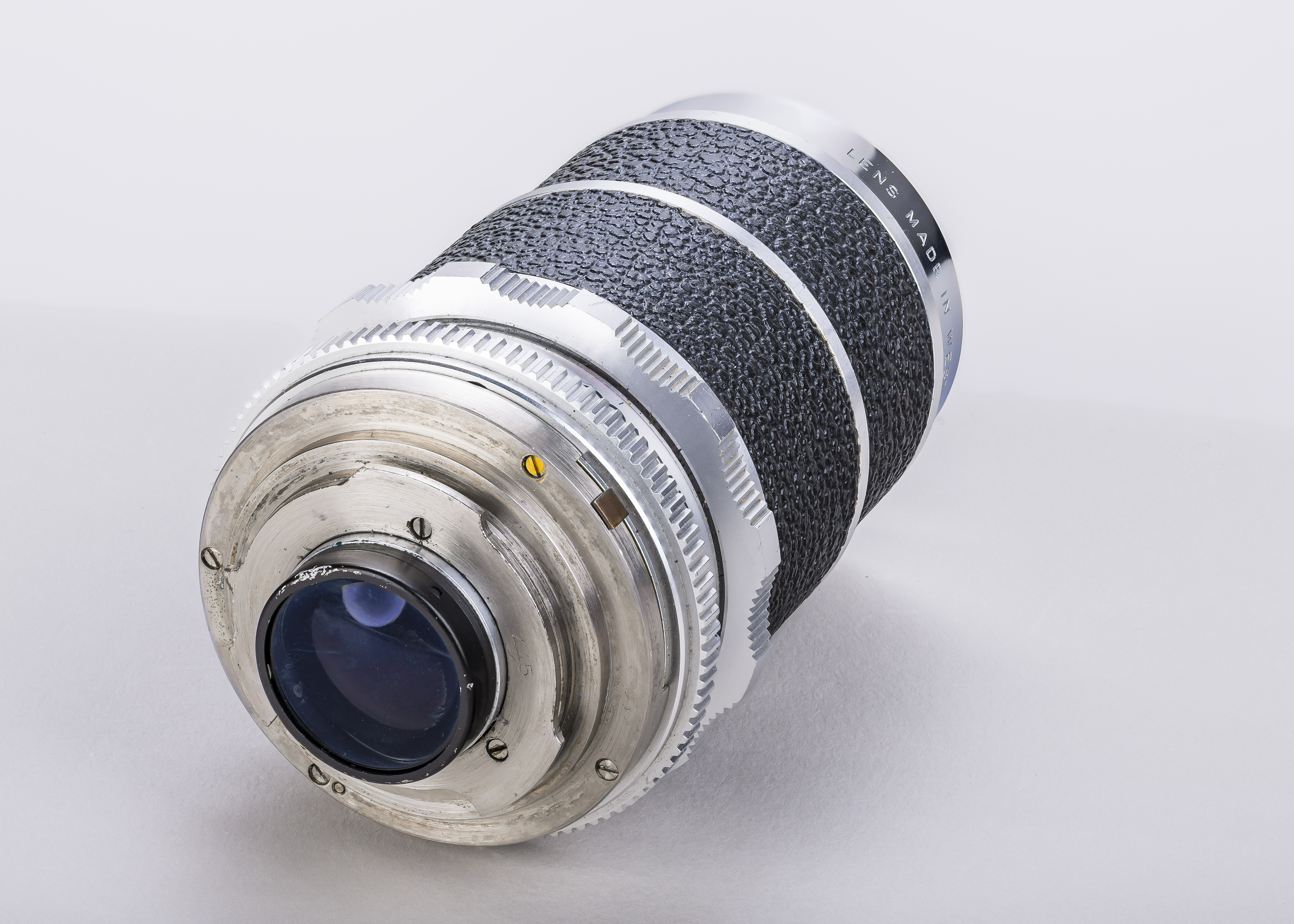
Voigtländer Super-Dynarex 135 mm f/4 lens, showing DKL-mount bayonet lugs

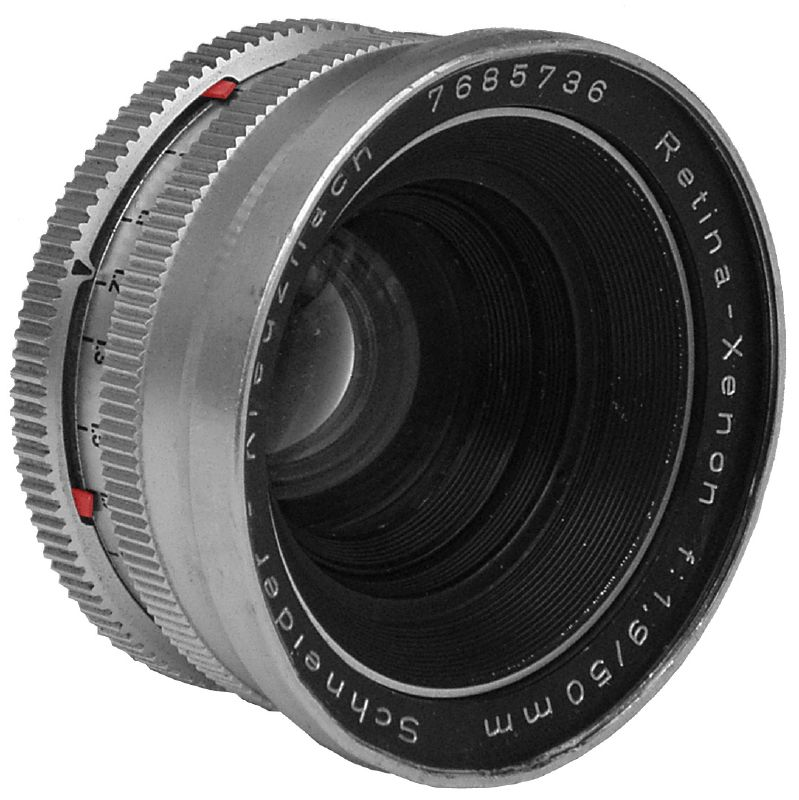
Schneider-Kreuznach Retina-Xenon 50 mm f/1.9 lens

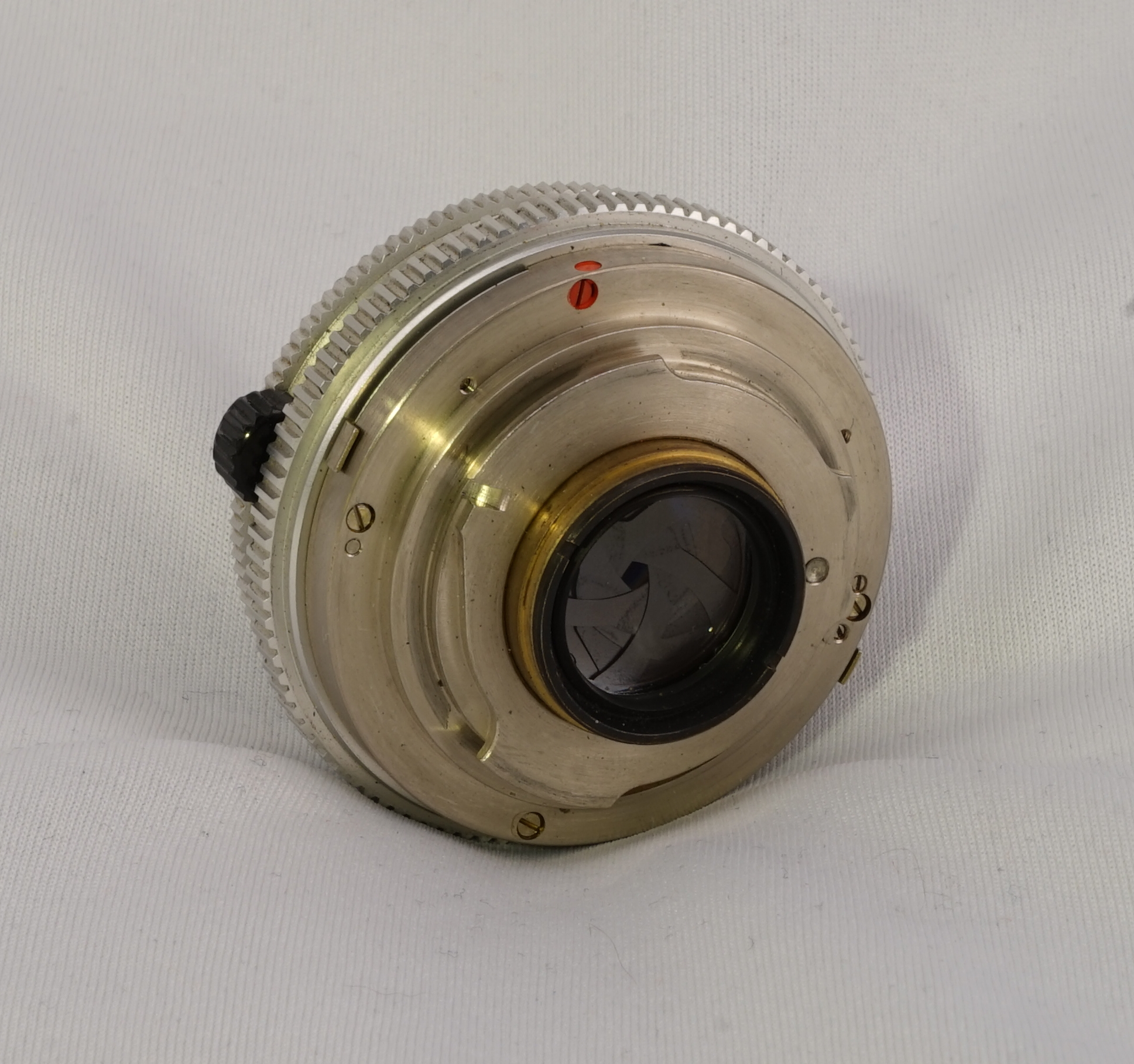
Schneider-Kreuznach Retina-Xenar 50 mm f/2.8 lens

In the late 1950s, Deckel introduced a bayonet lens mount which was used mainly with 35mm leaf-shutter cameras built in Germany, including the Kodak Retina IIIS, Kodak Retina Reflex S, Braun Paxette Reflex, and Voigtländer Bessamatic. DKL-mount lenses for the Kodak cameras were made by both Schneider-Kreuznach and Rodenstock, while Voigtländer made their own lenses for the Bessamatic line. DKL-mount lenses became less popular as focal-plane shutter cameras became more prevalent in the 1960s, and production ceased by the early 1970s.

The original bayonet was introduced in 1956 with the Voigtländer Vitessa T, followed by the Braun Colorette Super II in 1957, which shared the 44.7 mm (1.76 in) flange focal distance with the earlier Exakta system. Although the DKL-mount system is ostensibly compatible across manufacturers, camera manufacturers introduced variations in the mounting lug profiles and inclusion of an aperture control ring to physically prevent the attachment of lenses from other DKL-mount systems. For instance, the Schneider-Kreuznach and Rodenstock lenses made for the Kodak Retina S-mount do not fit Voigtländer cameras directly; a small physical modification to the mounting lugs will make them compatible. This was intended to prevent Voigtländer photographers from using less expensive Retina lenses.

DKL lens mount cameras include seven distinct variants (the earliest models released, Voigtländer Vitessa T and Braun Colorette Super II, share the same physical mount):

DKL-mount variants
Lens Camera		ENNA	Rodenstock	Schneider Kreuznach	Staeble	Steinheil	Voigtländer
Balda	Baldamatic III	No	No	Yes: Curtagon 2.8/35, Xenon 1.9/50, Xenar 2.8/50, Tele-Xenar 4/135	No	No	No
Braun	Colorette Super II (Note: The Braun Colorette Super II and Voigtländer Vitessa T share the same lens mount, so lenses are fully compatible between the two camera systems. Originally, Voigtländer lenses were sold only for the Vitessa T.)	No	Yes: Eurygon 4/35, Ysarex 2.8/50, Rotelar 4/85 & 4/135	Yes Radiogon 4/35, Xenar 2.8/50, Tele-Arton 4/85	No	Yes: Culmigon 4.5/35, Culminar 2.8/50	Yes: Skoparet 3.4/35, Color-Skopar 2.8/50, Dynaret 4.8/100, Super-Dynaret 4/135
Braun	Paxette Reflex	Yes: Lithagon 3.5/35	Yes: Rotelar 4/135	Yes: Xenar 2.8/50	Yes: Ultralit 2.8/50	Yes: Culmigon 4.5/35, Quinon 1.9/50	No
Iloca	Electric	No	Yes: Eurygon 4/35, Heligon 1.9/50, Ysarex 2.8/50, Rotelar 4/135	No	No	Yes: Culmigon 4.5/35, Quinon 1.9/50, Culminar 2.8/50	No
Kodak	Retina IIIS, Retina Reflex S / III / IV, Instamatic Reflex	No	Yes: Eurygon 2.8/30, Eurygon 4/35, Heligon 1.9/50, Ysarex 2.8/50, Rotelar 4/85 & 4/135	Yes: Curtagon 4/28 & 2.8/35, Xenon 1.9/50, Xenar 2.8/45 & 2.8/50, Tele-Arton 4/85, Tele-Xenar 4/135 & 4.8/200	No	Yes: Culminar 2.8/50	No
Voigtländer	Bessamatic, Ultramatic	No	No	No	No	No	Yes: Skoparex 3.4/35, Skopagon 2/40, Color-Skopar X 2.8/50, Color-Lanthar 2.8/50, Septon 2/50, Dynarex 3.4/90 & 4.8/100, Super-Dynarex 4/135, 4/200, & 5.6/350, Zoomar 2.8/36~82
Voigtländer	Vitessa T	No	Yes: Eurygon 4/35, Ysarex 2.8/50, Rotelar 4/85 & 4/135	Yes Radiogon 4/35, Xenar 2.8/50, Tele-Arton 4/85	No	Yes: Culmigon 4.5/35, Culminar 2.8/50	Yes: Skoparet 3.4/35, Color-Skopar 2.8/50, Dynaret 4.8/100, Super-Dynaret 4/135
Wirgin	Edixa electronica	No	No	Yes: Curtagon 4/28 & 2.8/35, Xenon 1.9/50, Xenar 2.8/50, Tele-Xenar 4/135	No	Yes: Culminar 2.8/50, Quinon 1.9/50	No

DKL-mount lenses
Focal length	Aperture	Manufacturer	Name	Construction	Min. Focus	Accessory size	Notes / Refs.
Wide-angle lenses
28 mm	f/4	Schneider-Kreuznach	Retina Curtagon	7e/6g	3.0 ft (0.91 m)	60 mm	
30 mm	f/2.8	Rodenstock	Retina Eurygon	7e/6g	?	60 mm	
35 mm	f/2.8	Schneider-Kreuznach	Retina Curtagon	6e/6g (Note: Kodak literature states 5e.)	3.0 ft (0.91 m)	32 mm	
35 mm	f/3.4	Voigtländer	Skoparex	6e/5g	3.3 / 1.3 ft (1.0 / 0.4 m) (Note: Original (Series 1) lenses had longer minimum focus distance, which was improved in later versions.)	40.5 mm	
35 mm	f/4	Rodenstock	Retina Eurygon	5e/5g	?		
35 mm	f/4	Schneider-Kreuznach	Radiogon	5e/4g	?	?	
40 mm	f/2.0	Voigtländer	Skopagon	9e/6g	3.0 / 1.6 ft (0.9 / 0.5 m)	54 mm	
Standard / Normal lenses
Focal length	Aperture	Manufacturer	Name	Construction	Min. Focus	Accessory size	Notes
45 mm	f/2.8	Schneider-Kreuznach	Xenar	4e/3g (Tessar)	3.3 ft (1.0 m)		
50 mm	f/1.9	Rodenstock	Retina Heligon	?	?	60 mm	
50 mm	f/1.9	Schneider-Kreuznach	Xenon	6e/4g (Double-Gauss)	2.0 ft (0.61 m)	60 mm	
50 mm	f/1.9	Steinheil	Quinon	6e/4g (Double-Gauss)	?	?	
50 mm	f/2.0	Voigtländer	Septon	7e/5g	3.0 / 2.0 ft (0.9 / 0.6 m)	54 mm	
50 mm	f/2.8	Rodenstock	Retina Ysarex	4e/3g (Tessar)	?	32 mm	
50 mm	f/2.8	Schneider-Kreuznach	Retina Xenar	4e/3g (Tessar)	?	32 mm	
50 mm	f/2.8	Steinheil	Culminar	4e/3g (Tessar)	?	?	
50 mm	f/2.8	Voigtländer	Color-Lanthar	3e/3g	3.3 ft (1.0 m)	40.5 mm	
50 mm	f/2.8	Voigtländer	Color-Skopar X	4e/3g (Tessar)	3.3 / 2.0 ft (1.0 / 0.6 m)	40.5 mm	
Telephoto lenses
Focal length	Aperture	Manufacturer	Name	Construction	Min. Focus	Accessory size	Notes
85 mm	f/4	Schneider-Kreuznach	Retina Tele-Arton	5e/4g	6.0 ft (1.8 m)	32 mm	
85 mm	f/4	Rodenstock	Retina Rotelar	5e/4g	?	32 mm	
90 mm	f/3.4	Voigtländer	Dynarex	5e/4g	6.6 ft (2.0 m)	40.5 mm	
100 mm	f/4.8	Voigtländer	Dynarex	6e/4g	3.3 ft (01.0 m)	54 mm	
135 mm	f/4	Schneider-Kreuznach	Retina Tele-Xenar	5e	14 ft (4.3 m)	60 mm	(Note: Accepts "T I/60" close-up lens to shorten minimum focusing distance.)
135 mm	f/4	Rodenstock	Retina Rotelar	5e/4g	?	60 mm	
135 mm	f/4.0	Voigtländer	Super-Dynarex	4e/3g	13.1 ft (4.0 m)	40.5 mm	
200 mm	f/4.0	Voigtländer	Super-Dynarex	5e/4g	27.9 ft (8.5 m)	77 mm	
200 mm	f/4.8	Schneider-Kreuznach	Retina Tele-Xenar	7e	28 ft (8.5 m)		
350 mm	f/5.6	Voigtländer	Super-Dynarex	7e/6g	91.9 ft (28.0 m)	95 mm	
Zoom lenses
Focal length	Aperture	Manufacturer	Name	Construction	Min. Focus	Accessory size	Notes
36–82 mm	f/2.8	Voigtländer	Zoomar	14e/11g	4.3 ft (1.3 m)	77 mm	
