= Iloca =

Type of camera

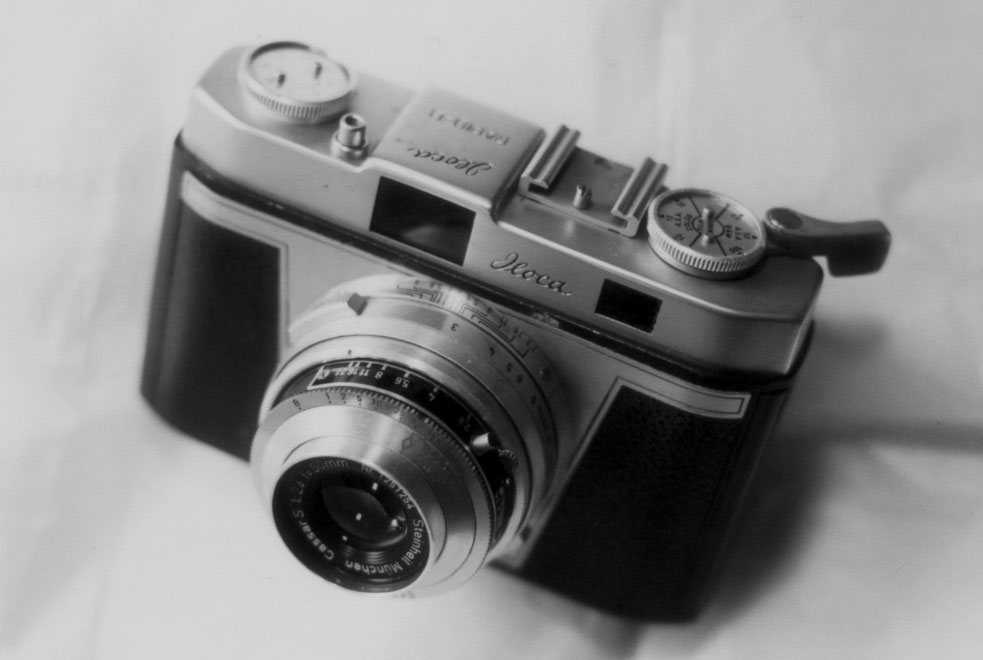

Overview
- Type: 35 mm

Focusing
- Focus: manual

The Iloca was a 35mm rangefinder camera produced from 1952 to 1959 by Wilhelm Witt of Hamburg. Models designated "Rapid" had a rapid winding lever.

The Iloca was the first 35mm camera with an integrated electric motor wind. It was very expensive and sold poorly in Europe, but was much more successful in the USA where it was sold as the Graphic 35 Electric.

The company was acquired by Agfa in 1960, and the Iloca Electric was re-introduced as the Agfa Selecta m, with a fixed f2.8 Solinar lens in place of the interchangeable bayonet mount.

== Iloca cameras ==
- Iloca IIa
- Iloca Stereo II - 1951
- Iloca Rapid (A) - 1952
- Iloca Rapid B / Sears Tower 51 - 1954
- Iloca Rapid I - 1956
- Iloca Rapid IL / MPP Iloca - 1956
- Iloca Rapid IIL / Sears Tower 52 / Argus V-100 - 1956
- Iloca Rapid III - 1959
- Iloca Automatic
- Iloca Electric / Graphic 35 Electric - 1959
