= Shutter (photography) =

Component of a photographic camera

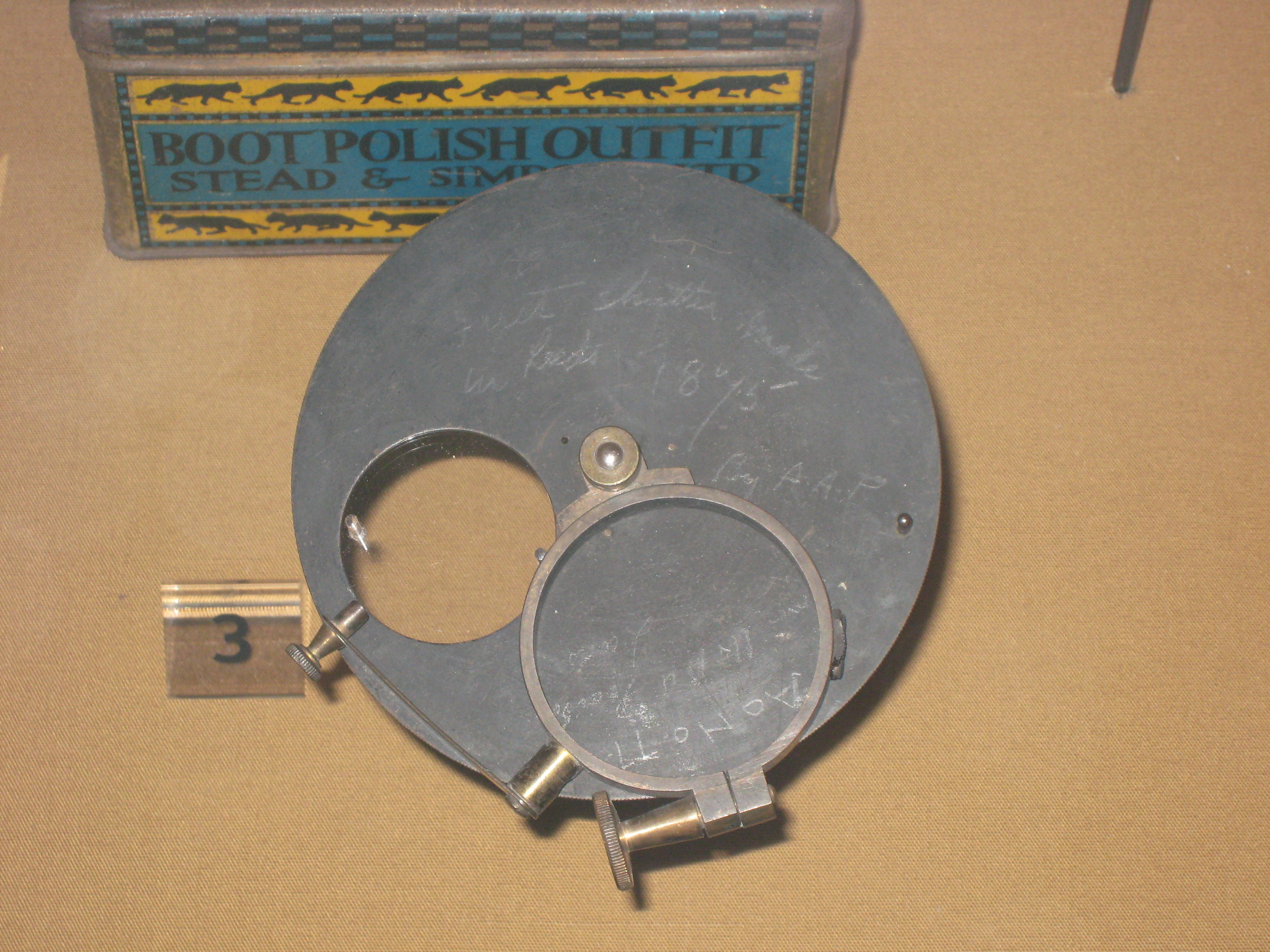
An early (1875) rapid acting shutter by A. A. Pearson of Leeds

In photography, a shutter is a device that allows light to pass for a determined period, exposing photographic film or a photosensitive digital sensor to light in order to capture a permanent image of a scene. A shutter can also be used to allow pulses of light to pass outwards, as seen in a movie projector or a signal lamp. A shutter of variable speed is used to control exposure time of the film. The shutter is constructed so that it automatically closes after a certain required time interval. The speed of the shutter is controlled either automatically by the camera based on the overall settings of the camera, manually through digital settings, or manually by a ring outside the camera on which various timings are marked.

== Camera shutter ==
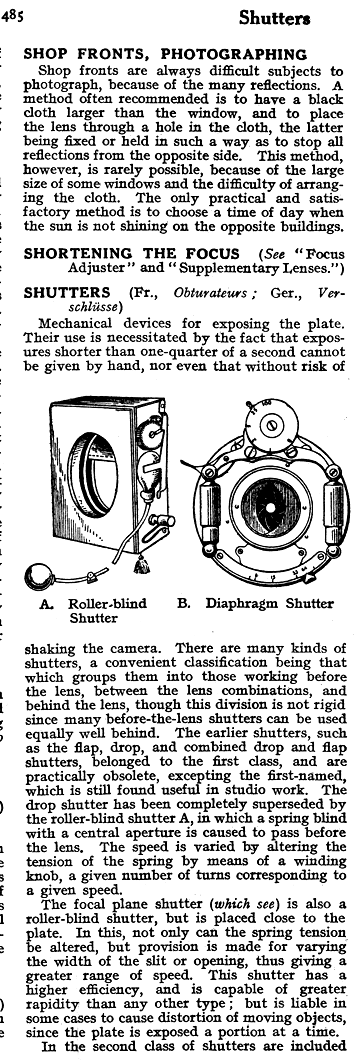
The 1911 Cyclopedia of Photography divides shutters into "roller-blind" and "diaphragm" types, corresponding roughly to the modern focal-plane and leaf types.

Camera shutters can be fitted in several positions:

- Leaf shutters are usually fitted within a lens assembly (central shutter), or more rarely immediately behind (behind-the-lens shutter) or, even more rarely, in front of a lens, and shut off the beam of light where it is narrow.
- Focal-plane shutters are mounted near the focal plane and move to uncover the film or sensor.

Behind-the-lens shutters were used in some cameras with limited lens interchangeability. Shutters in front of the lens, sometimes simply a lens cap that is removed and replaced for the long exposures required, were used in the early days of photography. Other mechanisms than the dilating aperture and the sliding curtains have been used; anything which exposes the film to light for a specified time will suffice.

The time for which a shutter remains open (exposure time, often called "shutter speed") is determined by a timing mechanism. These were originally pneumatic (Compound shutter) or clockwork, but since the late twentieth century are mostly electronic. Mechanical shutters typically had a Time setting, where the shutter opened when the button was pressed and remained open until it was pressed again, Bulb where the shutter remained open as long as the button was pressed (originally actuated by squeezing an actual rubber bulb), and Instantaneous exposure, with settings ranging from 30" to 1/4000" for the best leaf shutters, faster for focal-plane shutters, and more restricted for basic types. The reciprocal of exposure time in seconds is often used for engraving shutter settings. For example, a marking of "250" denotes 1/250". This does not cause confusion in practice.

The exposure time and the effective aperture of the lens must together be such as to allow the right amount of light to reach the film or sensor. Additionally, the exposure time must be suitable to handle any motion of the subject. Usually it must be fast enough to "freeze" rapid motion, unless a controlled degree of motion blur is desired, for example to give a sensation of movement.

Most shutters have a flash synchronization switch to trigger a flash, if connected. This was quite a complicated matter with mechanical shutters and flashbulbs which took an appreciable time to reach full brightness, focal-plane shutters making this even more difficult. Special flashbulbs were designed which had a prolonged burn, illuminating the scene for the whole time taken by a focal plane shutter slit to move across the film. These problems were essentially solved for non-focal-plane shutters with the advent of electronic flash units which fire virtually instantaneously and emit a very short flash.

When using a focal-plane shutter with a flash, if the shutter is set at its X-sync speed or slower the whole frame will be exposed when the flash fires (otherwise only a band of the film will be exposed). Some electronic flashes can produce a longer pulse compatible with a focal-plane shutter operated at much higher shutter speeds. The focal-plane shutter will still impart focal-plane shutter distortions to a rapidly moving subject.

Cinematography uses a rotary disc shutter in movie cameras, a continuously spinning disc which conceals the image with a reflex mirror during the intermittent motion between frame exposure. The disc then spins to an open section that exposes the next frame of film while it is held by the registration pin.

=== Focal-plane shutter ===
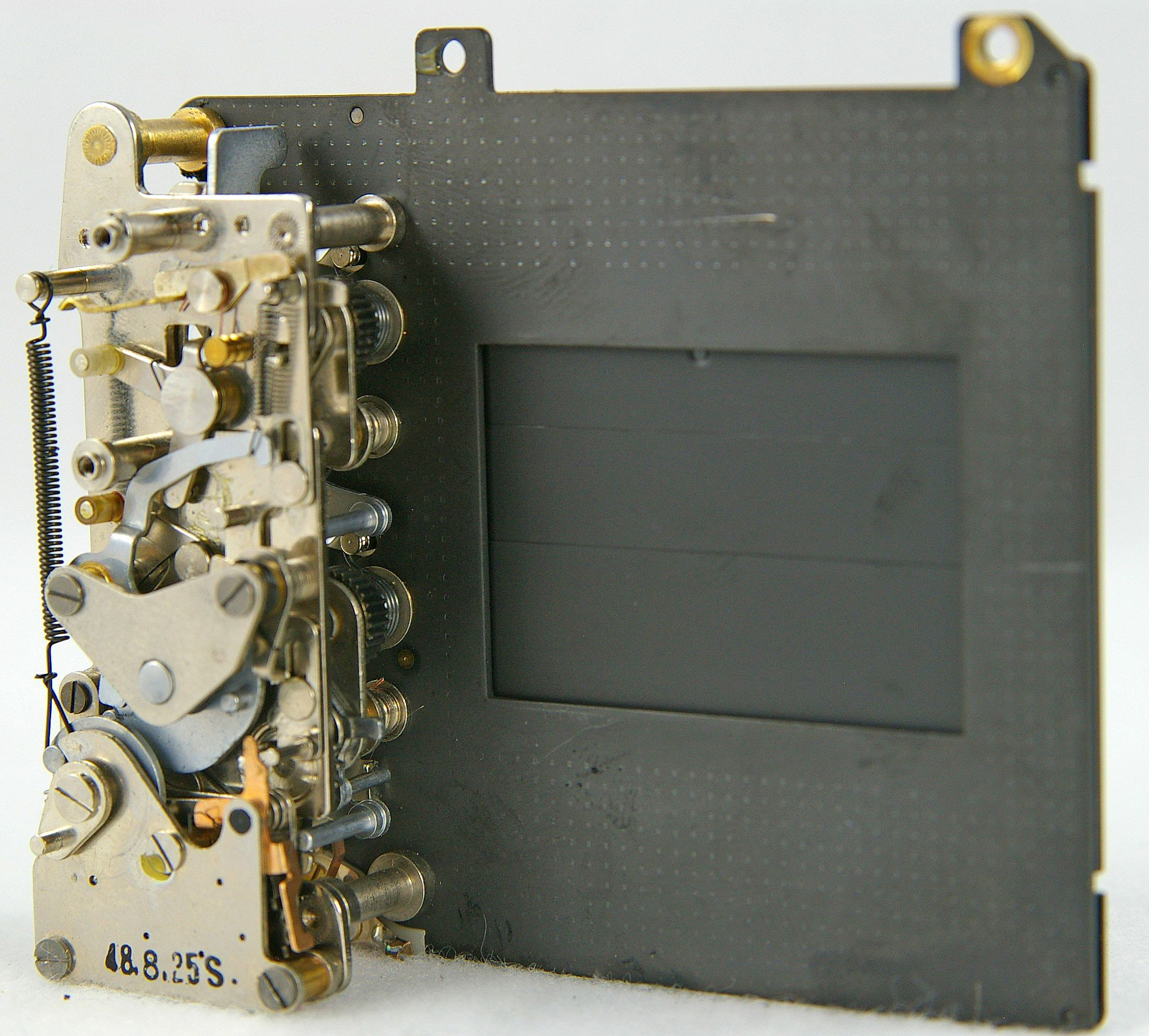
A focal-plane shutter. The plastic curtains travel vertically.

A focal-plane shutter is positioned just in front of the film, in the focal plane, and moves an aperture across the film until the full frame has been exposed. Focal-plane shutters are usually implemented as a pair of light-tight cloth, metal, or plastic curtains. For shutter speeds slower than a certain point (known as the X-sync speed of the shutter), which depends on the camera, one curtain of the shutter opens, and the other closes after the correct exposure time. At shutter speeds faster than the X-sync speed, the top curtain of the shutter travels across the focal plane, with the second curtain following behind, effectively moving a slit across the focal plane until each part of the film or sensor has been exposed for the correct time. The effective exposure time can be much shorter than for central shutters, at the cost of some distortion of fast-moving subjects.

Focal plane shutters have the advantage over central leaf shutters of allowing the use of interchangeable lenses without requiring a separate shutter for each lens. (Leaf shutters behind the lens also allow interchanging the lens using a single shutter.)

They have several disadvantages as well:

- Distortion of fast-moving subjects: although no part of the film is exposed for longer than the time set on the dial, one edge of the film is exposed an appreciable time after the other, so that a horizontally moving shutter will, for example, elongate or shorten the image of a car speeding in the same or the opposite direction to the shutter movement.
- They are noisier, which is a detriment to candid and nature photography.
- Their more complex mechanical structure causes a shorter life-span than other shutter designs.
- If a focal-plane shutter camera is left with sunlight falling on the lens (and the mirror up for an SLR), it is possible to burn a hole in the closed curtain of a non-metal shutter.
- Camera shake due to the impact of the larger curtains starting and stopping rapidly. Camera designers have learned to overcome SLR mirror-slap by including a mirror lock-up feature in some cameras. This removes the camera-shake from the large slapping mirror inside the camera, but does not prevent camera-shake caused by the shutter mechanism itself. Mirror-lock-up introduces yet another problem: with the mirror locked-up out of the way the optical viewfinder cannot be used for focussing, framing, or exposure metering. Digital SLR cameras with a live preview screen that displays the view from the main imaging sensor can avoid this problem, as the photographer may focus and frame using the live preview screen instead. This prevents most camera shake from the focal-plane shutter in DSLRs, as instead of a first curtain an electronic shutter is used.

=== Simple leaf shutter ===
Simple leaf shutter: 1. Shutter plate; 2. Aperture covered by leaf shutter; 3. Aperture during exposure; 4. Leaf blade; 5. Catch mechanism; 6. Butterfly spring

A simple leaf shutter is a type of camera shutter consisting of a mechanism with one or more pivoting metal leaves which normally does not allow light through the lens onto the film, but which when triggered opens the shutter by moving the leaves to uncover the lens for the required time to make an exposure, then shuts.

Simple leaf shutters have a single leaf, or two leaves, which pivot so as to allow light through to the lens when triggered. If two leaves are used they have curved edges to create a roughly circular aperture. They typically have only one shutter speed and are commonly found in basic cameras, including disposable cameras. Some have more than one speed.

=== Guillotine shutter ===
In the simplest version of Guillotine shutter a plate with an aperture slides across the lens opening. Simple versions from the 1880s and 1890s were often known as Drop shutters. They worked vertically and were usually powered by a rubber band, a spring or just gravity. Later they were fitted to run horizontally in hand cameras where they were spring powered with spring tension or pneumatic regulation.

=== Rotating shutter ===
==== Simple rotary shutter ====
Many inexpensive box cameras had a shutter consisting of a round metal disk with a hole punched in it along with a spring-loaded release lever, with the solid disk blocking light from entering the camera. When the shutter release lever is actuated, the spring causes the disk to quickly rotate once so that the hole passes the camera aperture and allows light through for a brief moment. Rotary shutters typically only had one fixed, imprecise shutter speed, although most cameras had a Time setting that would lock the shutter open when the release is actuated, allowing for longer exposures.

==== Hemispheric ====
The shutter plate consisted of a part of a sphere integrated to rotate behind the lens. It was a type of shutter found on the Photosphere and other cameras.

=== Diaphragm shutter ===
Diaphragm or leaf shutters

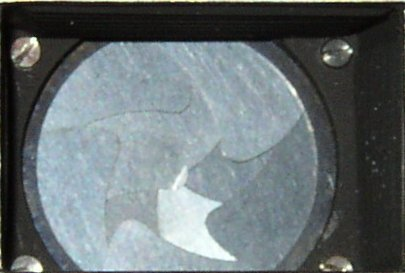
One diaphragm shutter opening over another in an Akarex camera

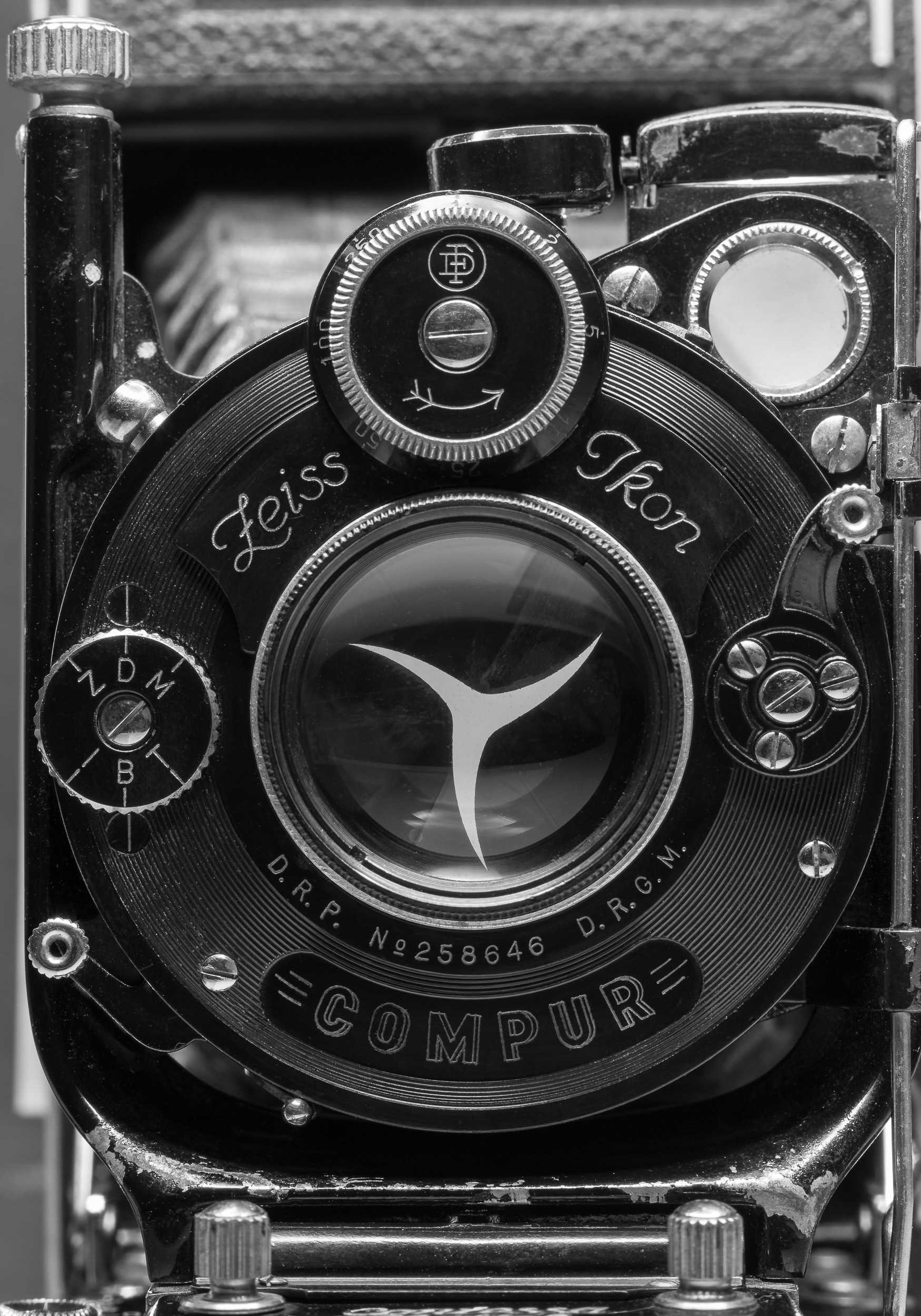
Dial-set three-leaf Compur shutter, partially open.

Entries in Cassell's Cyclopedia of Photography, 1911. The terminology diaphragm shutter has since fallen from common use.

A diaphragm or leaf shutter (as distinct from the simple leaf shutter above) consists of a number of thin blades which briefly uncover the camera aperture to make the exposure. The blades slide over each other in a way which creates a circular aperture which enlarges as quickly as possible to uncover the whole lens, stays open for the required time, then closes in the same way. The larger the number of blades, the more accurately circular is the aperture. Flash synchronization is easily achieved with a pair of contacts that close when the shutter is fully open.

Ideally the shutter opens instantaneously, remains open as long as required, and closes instantaneously. This is essentially the case at slower speeds, but as speeds approach their maximum the shutter is far from fully open for a significant part of the exposure time. Effectively the shutter acts as an additional aperture, and may cause an increased depth of field, undesirable if shallow focus is being used creatively. Or it may cause mechanical vignetting if the diaphragm is outside of the lens (like a focal plane shutter or apodization filter).

The term diaphragm shutter has also been used to describe an optical stop with a slit, near the focal plane of a moving-film high-speed camera.

A few types and makers of leaf shutters became very well known. The early Compound shutter had a pneumatic mechanism, with a piston sliding against air resistance in a cylinder. They were quieter at slow speeds than clockwork, but potentially very inaccurate. More accurate clockwork mechanisms then replaced the airbrake, and the German Compur, and the later Synchro-Compur, became virtually the standard quality shutter. Later the Japanese Copal shutter was widely adopted in quality equipment. The German Prontor and Japanese Seikosha shutters were also widely used. Up and Down with Compur: The development and photo-historical meaning of leaf shutters, by Klaus-Eckard Riess, translated by Robert "The Professor" Stoddard gives a detailed history and technical description of leaf shutters. The company Compur Monitor was still in business as of 2012, but made only gas detection systems. Leaf shutters under the Compur, Copal, and Seiko names are no longer manufactured.

For large format cameras, the shutter sizes established by Compur and Compound became de facto size standards:

Leaf shutter dimensions
Size Dimension	#00	#0	#1	#2 (Compur) (Note: Multiple variants; sizes may vary)	#3	#3 (Ilex) (Note: non-Dialset version)	#3s (Copal)	#4 (Ilex)	#5 (Ilex)
Body diameter	45.2 mm (1.78 in)	58 mm (2.3 in)	70.5 mm (2.78 in)	80.5 mm (3.17 in)		—N/a	—N/a		
Front lens thread	M22.5-0.5	M29.5-0.5	M40-0.75	M45.75-0.75	M58-0.75	1.775-48	M56-0.75	2.340-40	2.988-30
Rear lens thread	M22.5-0.5	M29.5-0.5	M36-0.75	M45.75-0.75	M58-0.75	1.775-48	M56-0.75	2.340-40	2.988-30
Depth	16 mm (0.63 in)	20 mm (0.79 in)		26.75 mm (1.053 in)	26.75 mm (1.053 in) (Compur) 32 mm (1.3 in) (Copal) 31.5 mm (1.24 in) (Prontor)	26.0 mm (1.025 in)	28.6 mm (1.13 in)	26.9 mm (1.060 in)	
Front to iris	9.3 mm (0.37 in)	10.2 mm (0.40 in)	10.75 mm (0.423 in)	14.5 mm (0.57 in)	31.5 mm (1.24 in) (Compur) 17.7 mm (0.70 in) (Copal)	14.4 mm (0.566 in)	16.25 mm (0.640 in)	15.8 mm (0.623 in)	15.6 mm (0.614 in)
Mount flange thread	M25.0-0.5	M32.5-0.5	M39-0.75	M50-0.9	M62-0.75	1.915-40	M61-0.75	2.500-30	3.225-30
Lens board hole diameter	26.3 mm (1.04 in)	34.6 mm (1.36 in)	41.6 mm (1.64 in)	52.5 mm (2.07 in)	65 mm (2.6 in)	50.4 mm (1.985 in)	64.1 mm (2.52 in)	66.1 mm (2.604 in)	85.5 mm (3.365 in)
Maximum iris diameter	17.4 mm (0.69 in)	24 mm (0.94 in)	30 mm (1.2 in)	35 mm (1.4 in)	45 mm (1.8 in)	34.6 mm (1.362 in)	45 mm (1.8 in)	43.9 mm (1.730 in)	64.1 mm (2.525 in)
Copal	No	Yes	Yes	No	Yes	No	Yes	No	No
Compur	Yes	Yes	Yes	Yes	Yes	No	No	No	No
Prontor / Prontor Pro	No	Yes	Yes	No	Yes	No	No	No	No
Ilex	No	No	No	No	No	Yes	No	Yes	Yes
Compound	No	No	No	No	No	Yes	No	Yes	Yes

=== Central shutter ===
A central shutter is not a type of shutter as such, but describes the position of the shutter: it is typically a leaf shutter (or simple leaf shutter), and located within the lens assembly where a relatively small opening allows light to cover the entire image. Leaf shutters can also be located behind, but near, the lens, allowing lens interchangeability. The alternative to a central or behind-the-lens shutter is a focal-plane shutter.

Interchangeable-lens cameras with a central shutter within the lens body require that each lens has a shutter built into it. In practice most cameras with interchangeable lenses use a single focal plane shutter in the camera body for all lenses, while cameras with a fixed lens use a central shutter. Many medium-format and most large-format cameras, however, have interchangeable lenses each fitted with a central shutter. A few interchangeable-lens cameras have a behind-the-lens leaf shutter. Large-format press cameras often had a focal-plane shutter. Some had both a focal-plane shutter (for lens interchangeability) and a lens with central shutter (for flash synchronisation); one shutter would be locked open.

Film cameras, but not digital cameras, with a central shutter and interchangeable lenses often have a secondary shutter or darkslide to cover the film and allow changing lens in mid-roll without fogging the film.

The main advantages of central and behind-the-lens leaf shutters compared to a focal-plane shutter are:

- Flash synchronization is possible at all speeds because the shutter opens fully, unlike a focal-plane shutter sliding a slit relatively slowly across the film for a short effective exposure.
- Small size is possible as the shutter is placed where the bundle of rays is narrow, either inside or just behind the lens.
- Many versions have no connection between the cocking mechanism and the film advance mechanism, making multiple exposures possible (this can be a disadvantage, as multiple exposures can be produced accidentally if the photographer forgets to advance the film).
- Usually much quieter.
- More realistic photographs in high speed panning—lateral focal plane shutters compress or elongate the image in such cases.
- Longer shutter life.

Some disadvantages of the central shutter are:

- For an interchangeable lens system, each lens has to have a shutter built into it.
- All leaf shutter speeds are limited by the speed at which the leaves can move: typically 1/500th of a second for a high-specification diaphragm shutter and 1/125th of a second for a simple leaf shutter.
- Some versions may have no connection between the cocking mechanism and the film advance mechanism, making accidental multiple exposures a common problem, although this is a feature of camera manufacture rather than the shutter itself.

=== Electronic shutter ===
Digital image sensors (both CMOS and CCD image sensors) can be constructed to give a shutter equivalent function by transferring many pixel cell charges at one time to a paired shaded double called frame transfer shutter. If the full-frame is transferred at one time, it is a global shutter. Often the shaded cells can independently be read, while the others are again collecting light. Extremely fast shutter operation is possible as there are no moving parts or any serialized data transfers. Global shutter can also be used for videos as a replacement for rotary disc shutters.

Image sensors without a shaded full-frame double must use serialized data transfer of illuminated pixels called rolling shutter. A rolling shutter scans the image in a line-by-line fashion, so that different lines are exposed at different instants, as in a mechanical focal-plane shutter, so that motion of either camera or subject will cause geometric distortions, such as skew or wobble.

Today, most digital cameras use combination of mechanical shutter and electronic shutter or mechanical shutter solely. Mechanical shutter can accommodate up to 1/16000 seconds (for example the Minolta Dynax/Maxxum/α-9 film camera had a maximum of 1/12000, a record in its era, and the later digital Nikon D1 series were capable of 1/16000), while electronic shutter can accommodate at least 1/32000 seconds, used for many superzoom cameras and currently many Fujifilm APS-C cameras (X-Pro2, X-T1, X100T and others).

Stacked CMOS sensors combine the image sensor itself with ADCs and digital memory in the same package. The readout of these sensors is faster than traditional sensors, because the digitized image is transferred into the digital memory in the sensor itself during readout and only afterwards transferred out of the sensor. This results in an electronic shutter which is as fast as a mechanical focal-plane shutter. Some cameras using stacked sensors, like the Nikon Z9, completely removed the mechanical shutter. Dynamic range and noise performance are not compromised, because these sensors do not utilize a global shutter.

== Shutter lag ==
Shutter lag is the time between the shutter release being pressed and the exposure starting. While this delay was insignificant on most film and some digital cameras, many digital cameras have significant delay, which can be a problem with fast-moving subjects as in sports and other action photography. Release lag of a bridge camera such as the 2010 Pentax X90 is a relatively short 1/50 s, or 21 milliseconds (ms). The Canon EOS 50D DSLR is specified at 131 ms lag.

In many cases, autofocus (AF) lag is the root cause of shutter lag. Lower-cost cameras and low-light or low-contrast situations will make the effect more pronounced and it is in these cases that AF lag is more noticed. Most AF systems use contrast to determine focus; in situations where contrast is low, the speed at which the camera can determine the best focus can be quite noticeable. Since most modern cameras will not activate the shutter until autofocus is complete, the result is shutter lag. In these cases, the photographer can switch to manual focus to avoid the delay that is attributable to the AF function.

== Shutter cycle ==
A shutter cycle is the process of the shutter opening, closing, and resetting to where it is ready to open again. The life-expectancy of a mechanical shutter is often expressed as a number of shutter cycles. Most digital cameras save the shutter cycle information along with the photos, which contains valuable information such as shutter speed, aperture, and shutter count. There are multiple websites and applications to access the Exif data.

== Projector shutter ==
In movie projection, the shutter admits light from the lamphouse to illuminate the film across to the projection screen. To avoid brightness flicker, a double-bladed rotary disc shutter admits light two times per frame of film in 24 fps projection, resulting in 24 * 2 = 48 Hz, which is the lower brightness flicker fusion threshold. For 16fps (most silent films and Regular 8mm) and 18fps (Super 8), a triple-bladed shutter is used instead, as 16 * 3 = 48 Hz and 18 * 3 = 54 Hz.

Shutters are also used simply to regulate pulses of light, with no film being used, as in a signal lamp.

== See also ==
- Photographic lens
- Kerr cell shutter
- Active shutter 3D system
