= Kodak Retina =

Series of 35mm cameras

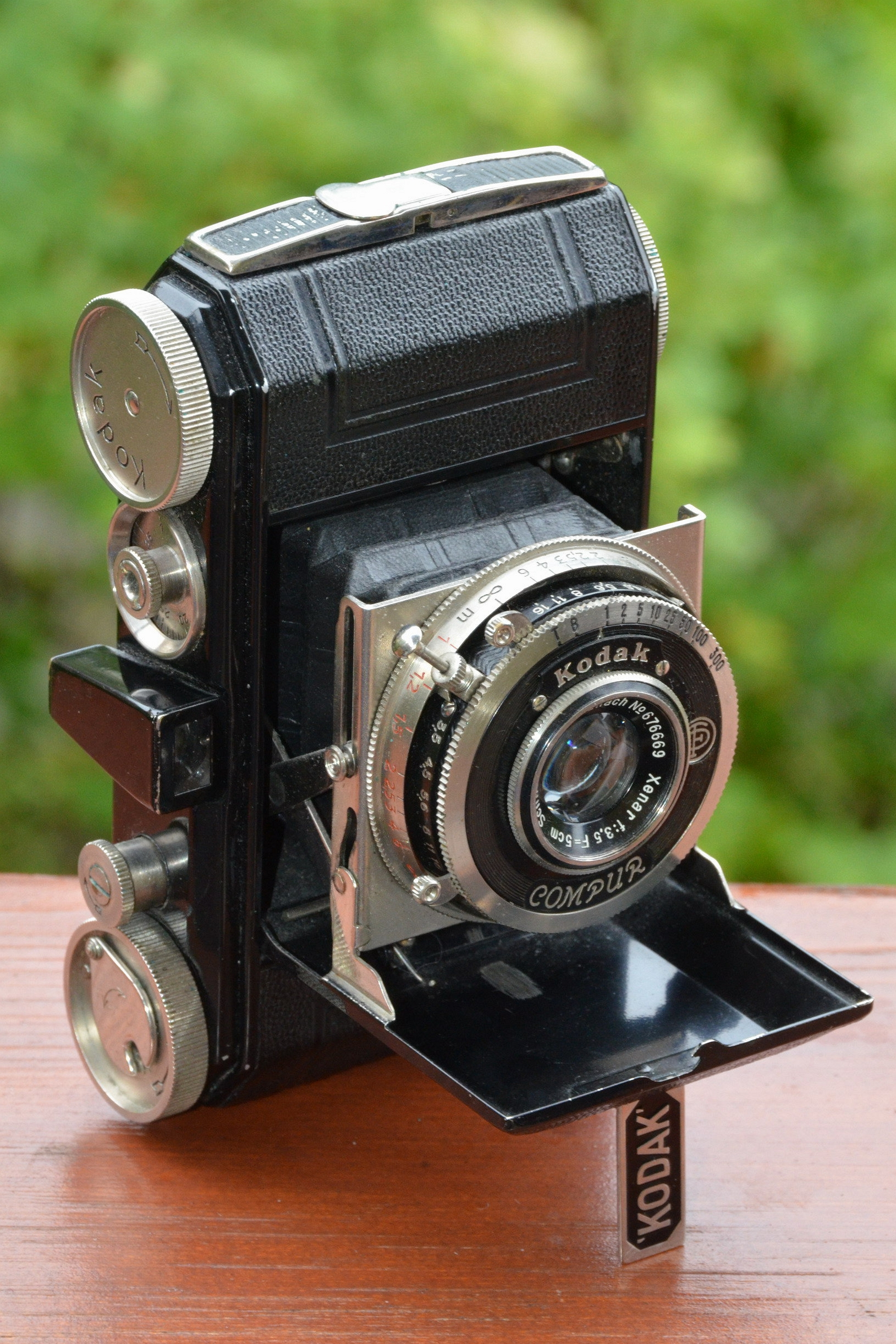
Kodak Retina (Nr. 117), 1934–1935 ("First Retina")

Retina was the brand-name of a long-running series of German-built Kodak 35mm cameras, produced from 1934 until 1969. Kodak Retina cameras were manufactured in Stuttgart-Wangen by the Kodak AG Dr. Nagel Werk which Kodak had acquired in December 1931.

The Retina line included a variety of folding and non-folding models, including the Retina Reflex single lens reflex camera. Retina cameras were noted for their compact size, high quality, and low cost compared to competitors. These cameras retain a strong following today, of both photographers and collectors.

Kodak AG also offered a companion line of less-expensive Retinette cameras, with similar looks and function.

== History ==
August Nagel was a prolific camera designer and entrepreneur who was one of the founders of Zeiss Ikon, when he merged his company, Contessa-Nettel AG, with Zeiss and others to form that group in 1919. As well as being an owner he was an active designer of fine Zeiss cameras including miniatures. He left Zeiss in 1928 to form his own firm Nagel Camera Werks AG, and produced the Nagel line of cameras, including glass plate, sheet-film, and roll-film cameras. Some of his notable designs are the: Vollenda, Duo-620, Pupille, Ranca, and Recomar cameras.

After selling Dr. August Nagel – Fabrik fuer Feinmechanik Werk in Stuttgart-Wangen to Kodak AG in December 1931, the new firm was designated "Kodak AG – Dr. Nagel Werk". Nagel continued to innovate including developing the Retina folding cameras around the new Kodak 135 preloaded 35mm film cartridge. Prior to this, most 35mm film was loaded by the user into proprietary cartridges in a darkroom or light-tight bag.

=== Folding Kodak Retina Cameras ===
In the early 1930s August Nagel was developing a 35mm camera and a preloaded disposable 35mm film cartridge, which would also fit in Leica and Contax cameras. Nagel was an expert in miniature cameras; his Vollenda miniature folder, along with the Ranca and Pupille collapsible cameras were smaller than the Leica and Contax cameras, but could use 50mm f:3.5 Elmar and other similar Tessar formula lenses in Compur shutters to create a larger 30mm x 40mm image on 127 rollfilm. The advantage of 35mm would be the elimination of the paper-backer allowing more images per roll of film.

All of the Kodak Retina cameras from the mid 1930s to the late 1950s were folding cameras with a short self-erecting bellows, lens board, and folding metal door/cover. These folding Kodak Retina cameras are listed below with their respective years of manufacture. While the previous photohistorical literature gave both a pre-war 3-digit "Type" code for each Retina and Retinette model and a post-war 3 digit "Type" code for each Retina or Retinette model, recent research indicates that the term "Type" can only be found for the post-war Retina and Retinette cameras in the contemporary Kodak AG documents. In the pre-war times, a number ( nummer, Nr.) code was used for all Kodak AG cameras, not just the Retina and Retinette models. So, in the interest of historical accuracy, pre-war Retina and Retinette cameras have a "Nr." code and post-war Retina and Retinette cameras have a "Type" code.

Folding Kodak Retina cameras by model
Class	1930s						1940s										1950s										1960
Class	4	5	6	7	8	9	0	1	2	3	4	5	6	7	8	9	0	1	2	3	4	5	6	7	8	9	1960
Retina I (viewfinder only)	Retina; Nr. 117		Retina (I); Nr. 119			Retina I Nr. 148 & 149						Retina I Type 010 (early)				Retina I Type 013		Retina Ia; Type 015						Retina IB; Type 019 Ausf. I			
Retina I (viewfinder only)		Retina; Nr. 118		Retina I Nr. 141				Retina I Nr. 167					Retina I Type 010								Retina Ib; Type 018				Retina IB; Type 019 Aust. II		
Retina I (viewfinder only)			Retina (I); Nr. 126		Retina I Nr. 143																						
Retina II (rangefinder)			Retina II; Nr. 122			Retina IIa; Nr. 150							Retina II; Type 011					Retina IIa; Type 016						Retina IIC; Type 029			
Retina II (rangefinder)				Retina II; Nr. 142												Retina II; Type 014					Retina IIc; Type 020						
Retina III (rangefinder & exposure meter)																					Retina IIIc; Type 021 Ausf. I						
Retina III (rangefinder & exposure meter)																								Retina IIIc; Type 021 Ausf. II			
Retina III (rangefinder & exposure meter)																								Retina IIIC; Type 028			

==== 1930s ====
Pre-war folding Kodak Retina cameras

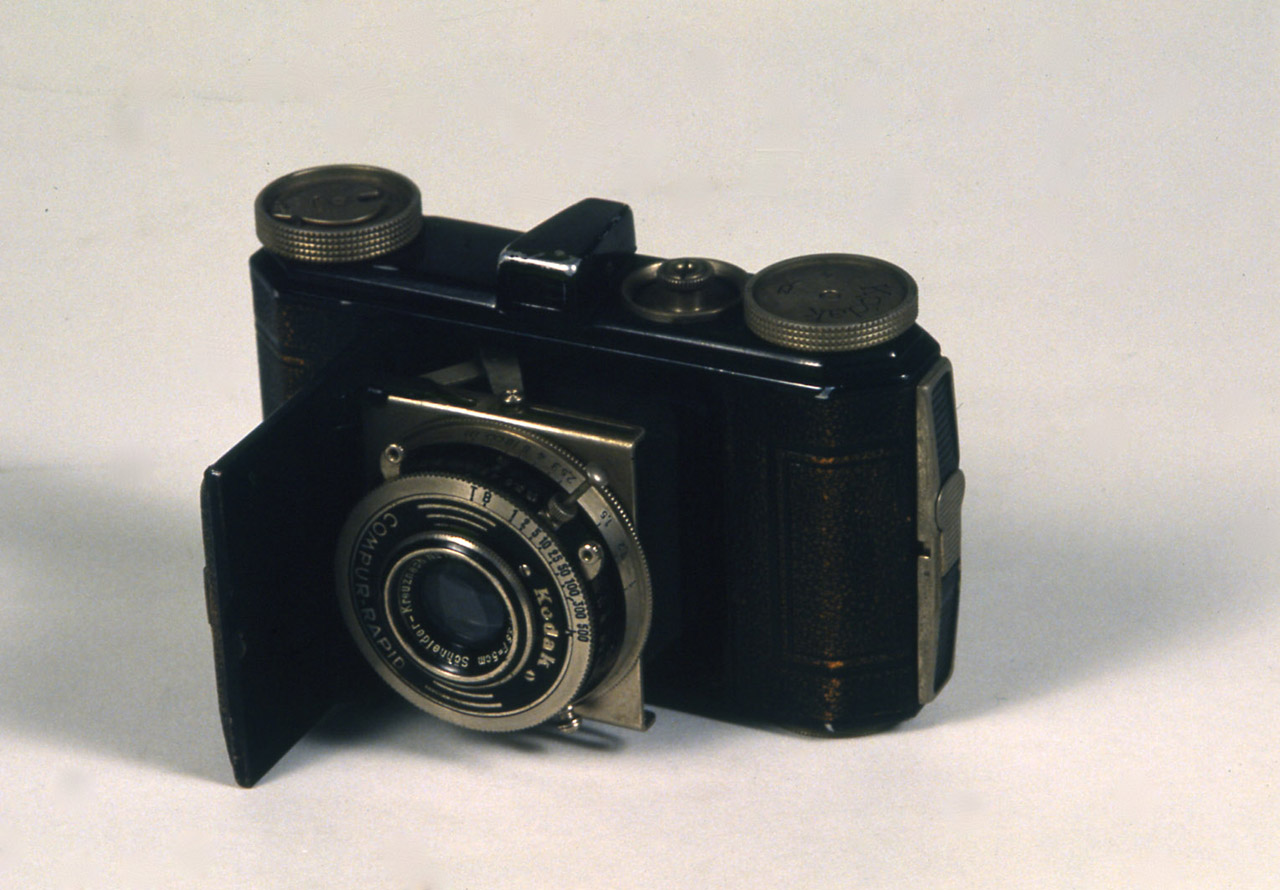
Retina (Nr. 118), 1935

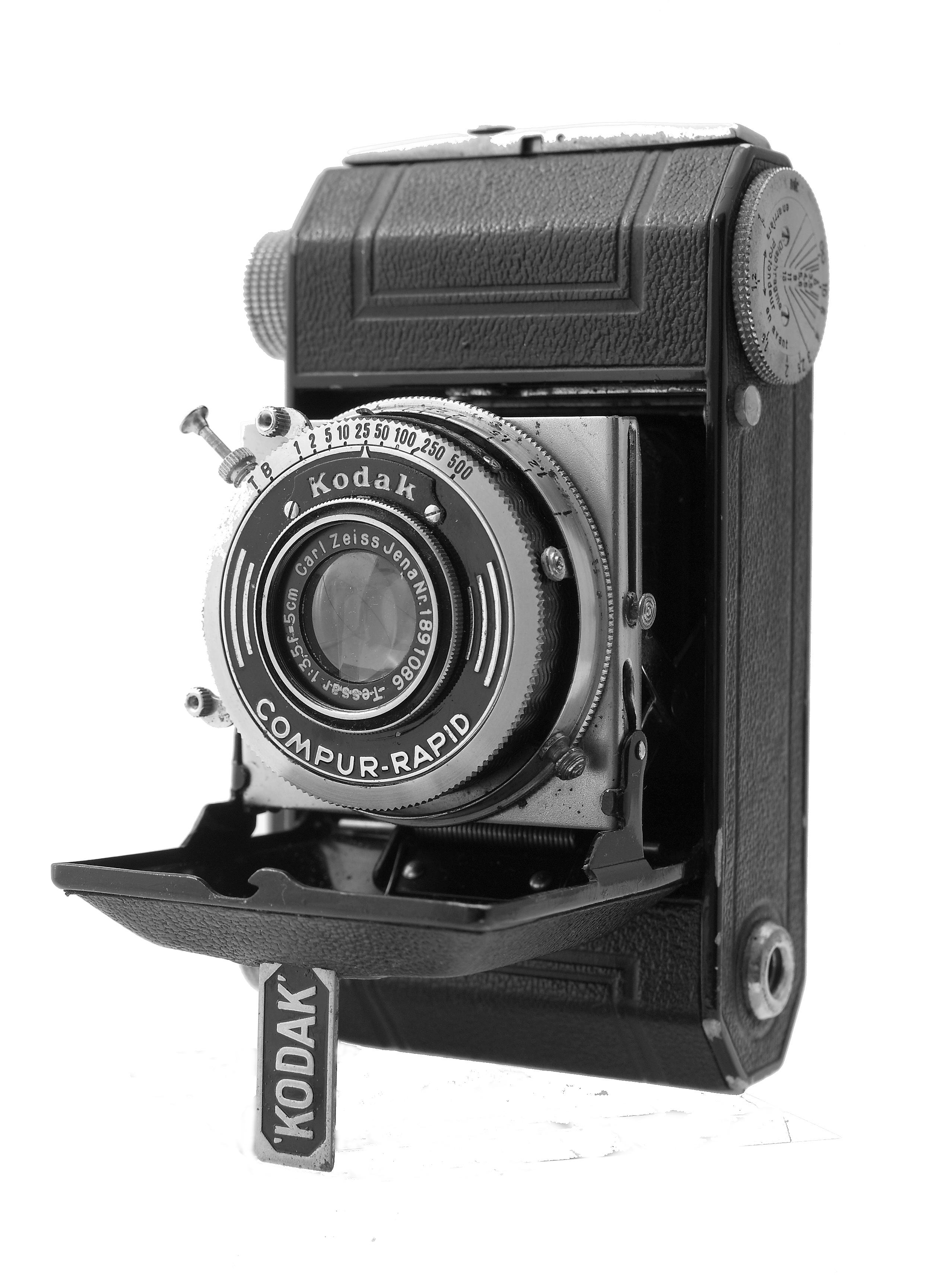
Retina (I) (Nr. 119), 1936

The first Retina, Nr. 117, was introduced in late July 1934. The successive model: Nr 118 Retina followed in 1935 with minor modifications to the Nr. 117. The Nr. 119 Retina (I) and the more expensive Nr. 126 Retina (I) follow in 1936. Nr. 117, Nr. 118 and Nr. 119 Retina cameras all had black lacquered top housings, black lacquered body edges and nickel-plated control surfaces. Nr. 126 Retina (I) was the first with a chrome-plated finish to the top housing, chrome-plated top deck below the rewind knob and chrome-plated control surfaces with the body edges being polished aluminum alloy with a clear lacquer coat. Nr. 122 Retina II was introduced in 1936 with a separate coupled rangefinder and viewfinder and at this point, Nr. 119 and Nr. 126 Retina cameras were designated as "Retina I" cameras. The Nr. 122 Retina II had a problematic film advance lever and was replaced in June 1937 by the Nr. 142 Retina II with a return to the knob advance. Nr. 141 Retina I is a chrome finished model with a shutter release on the top body which was introduced in late 1937. Nr. 143 Retina I was the black lacquer/nickel-plated version of the Nr. 141 Retina I introduced in early 1938. The identification of Retina I cameras is based on the finish and configuration of the top housings of each camera and should NOT be based on lens/shutter or serial number, as lenses, shutters and back doors can be easily interchanged by repairman. In 1939 a Nr. 150 Retina IIa was introduced to replace the Nr. 142 Retina II, but it was unrelated to the flash capable Type 016 Retina IIa series of the early 1950s. Also in 1939, the Nr. 148 Retina I and the Nr. 149 Retina I with double exposure prevention are introduced. Late versions of the Type 148 Retina I have a black lacquer finish to the body edges. The last pre-war Retina I is the Nr. 167 Retina I which was manufactured in July 1941 and was for export only.

==== Prewar lens/shutter combinations ====
These lens/shutter combinations were available on the following pre-war Kodak Retina cameras:

Retina I lens/shutter combinations

- Schneider Xenar f:3,5 F=5 cm / COMPUR
- Schneider Xenar f:3,5 F=5 cm / COMPUR-RAPID
- Schneider Retina-Xenar f:3,5 F=5 cm / COMPUR
- Schneider Retina-Xenar f:3,5 F=5 cm / COMPUR-RAPID
- Kodak-Anastigmat f:3,5 F=5 cm / COMPUR
- Kodak-Anastigmat f:3,5 F=5 cm / COMPUR-RAPID
- Kodak-Anastigmat f:4,5 F=5 cm / AGC K4S
- KODAK ANASTIGMAT 1:3.5 f=5 cm (French-made lens) / COMPUR-RAPID
- Kodak-Anastigmat Ektar f3,5 F=5 cm / COMPUR
- Kodak-Anastigmat Ektar f3,5 F=5 cm / COMPUR-RAPID
- Kodak-Anastigmat EKTAR f:3,5 F=5 cm / COMPUR-RAPID
- Carl Zeiss Jena Tessar 1:3,5 f=5 cm / COMPUR
- Carl Zeiss Jena Tessar 1:3,5 f=5 cm / COMPUR-RAPID

Retina II lens/shutter combinations

- Schneider Xenon f2,8 F=5 cm / COMPUR-RAPID
- Schneider Retina-Xenon f:2,8 F=5 cm / COMPUR-RAPID
- Schneider Xenon f2 F=5 cm / COMPUR-RAPID
- Schneider Retina-Xenon f:2 F=5 cm / COMPUR-RAPID
- Kodak-Ektar f:3,5 F=5 cm / COMPUR-RAPID

==== WWII and 1940s ====
Post-war folding Kodak Retina cameras

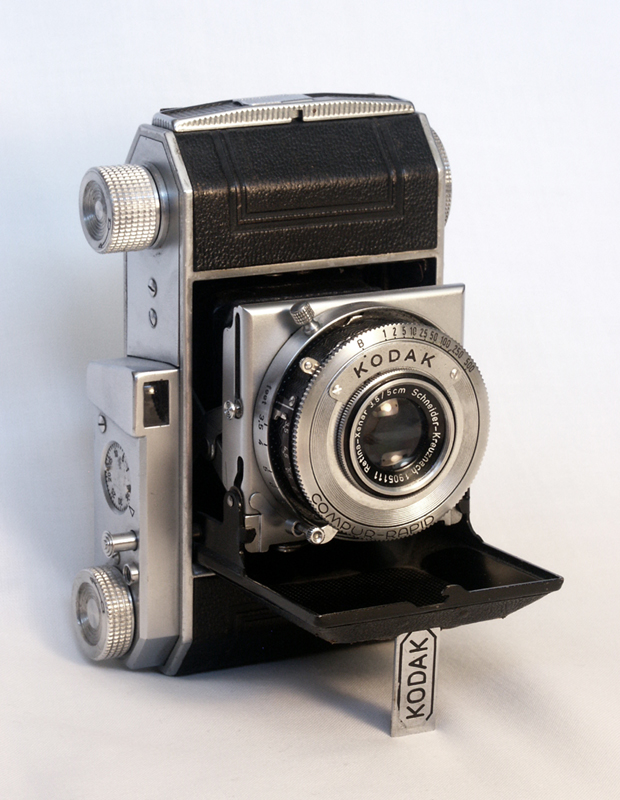
Retina I (Type 010), 1946–49

Retina Ia (Type 015), 1951–54

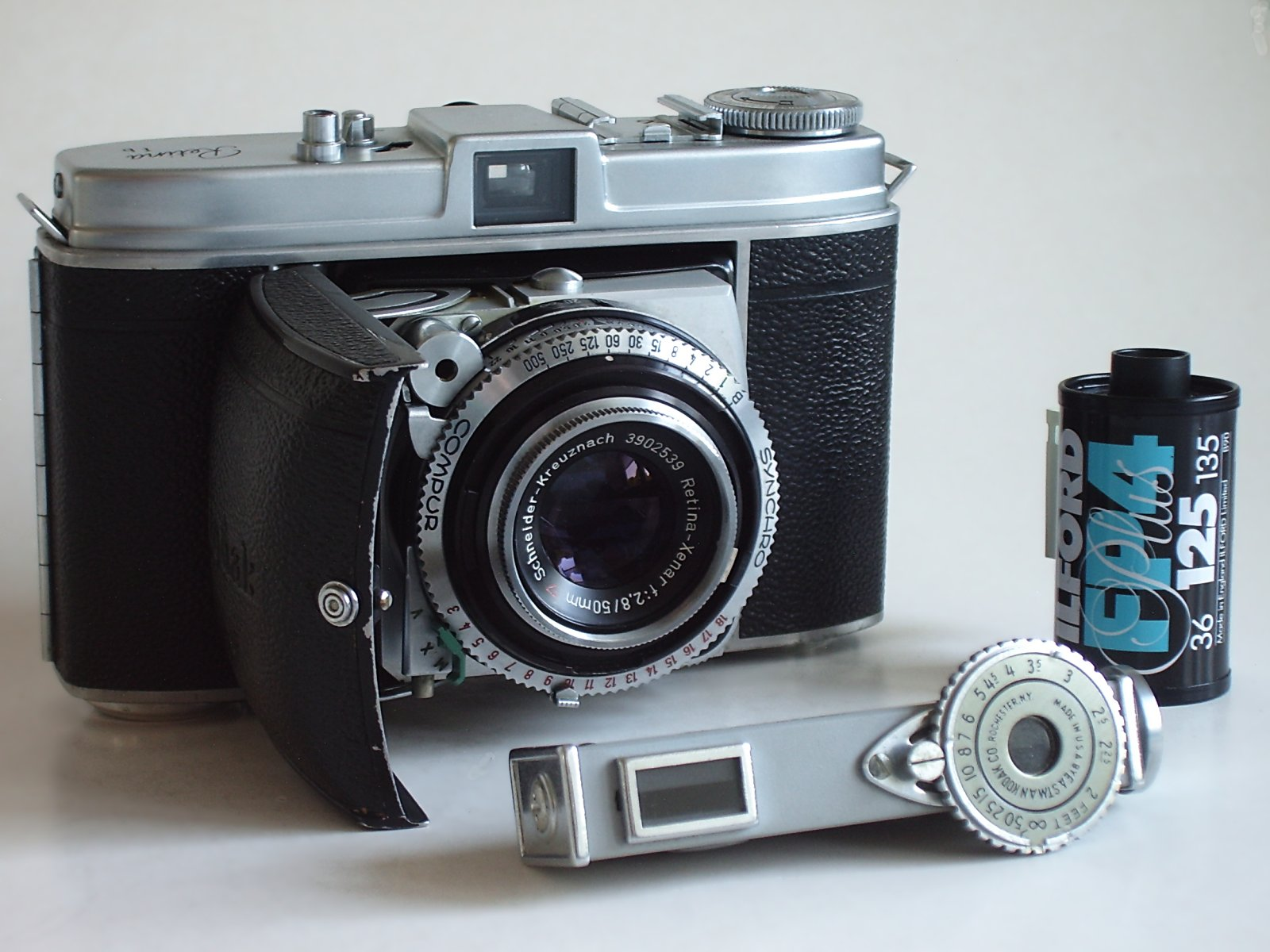
Retina Ib (Type 018) and rangefinder, 1954–57

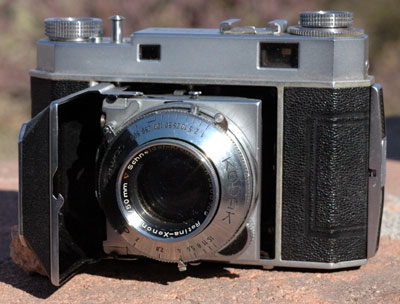
Retina II (Type 014), 1949–50

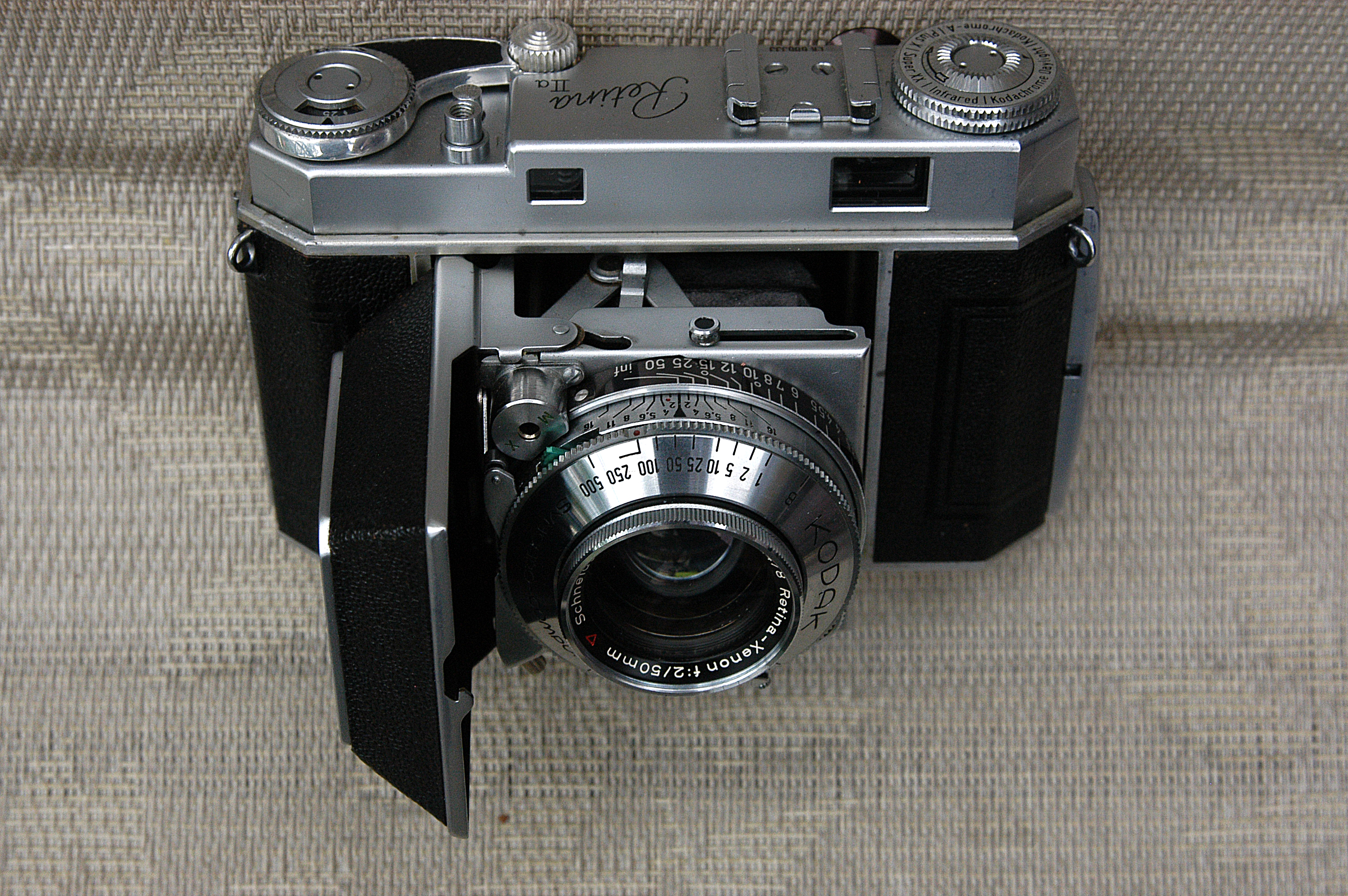
Retina IIa (Type 016), 1951–54

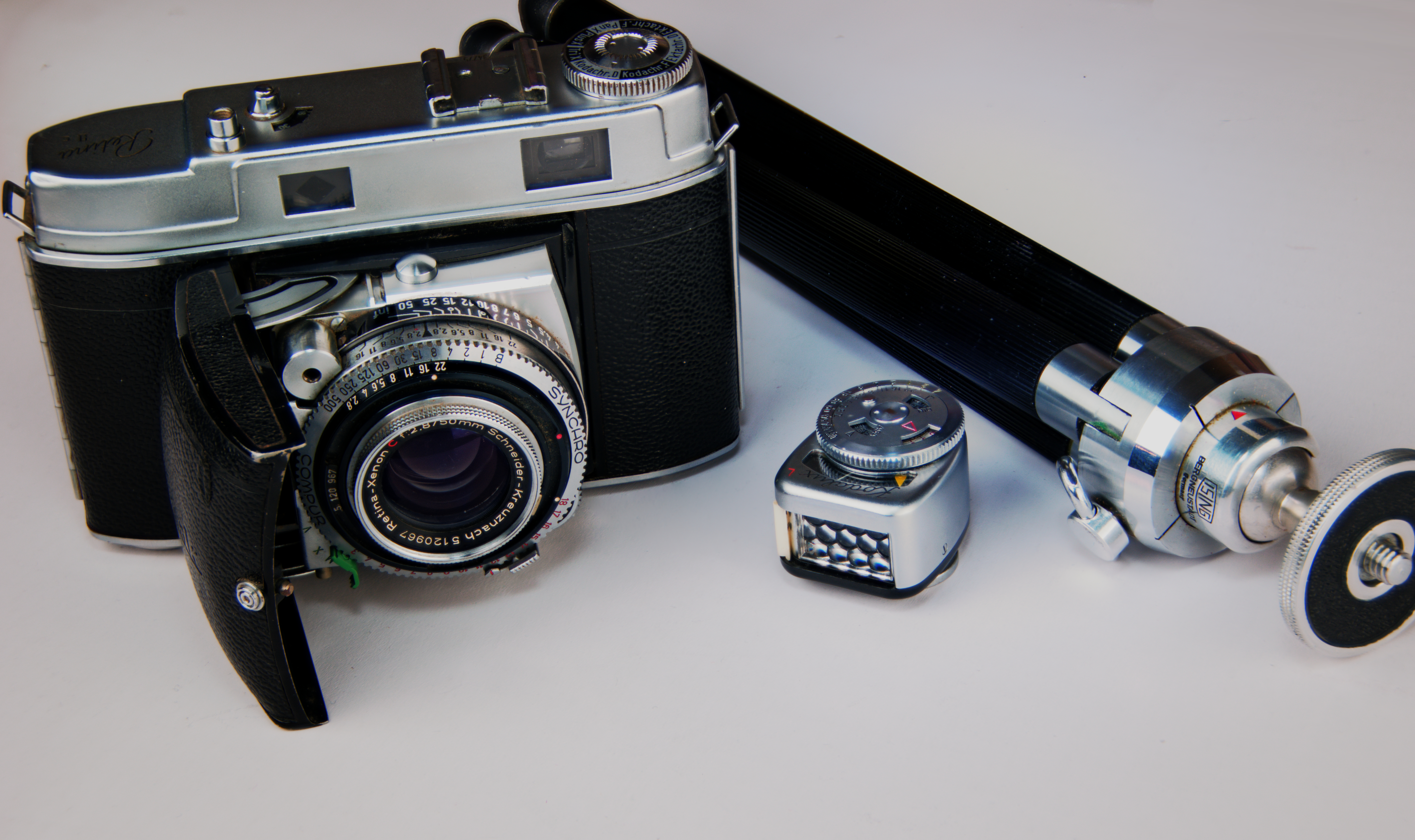
Retina IIc (Type 020) with accessories, 1954–57

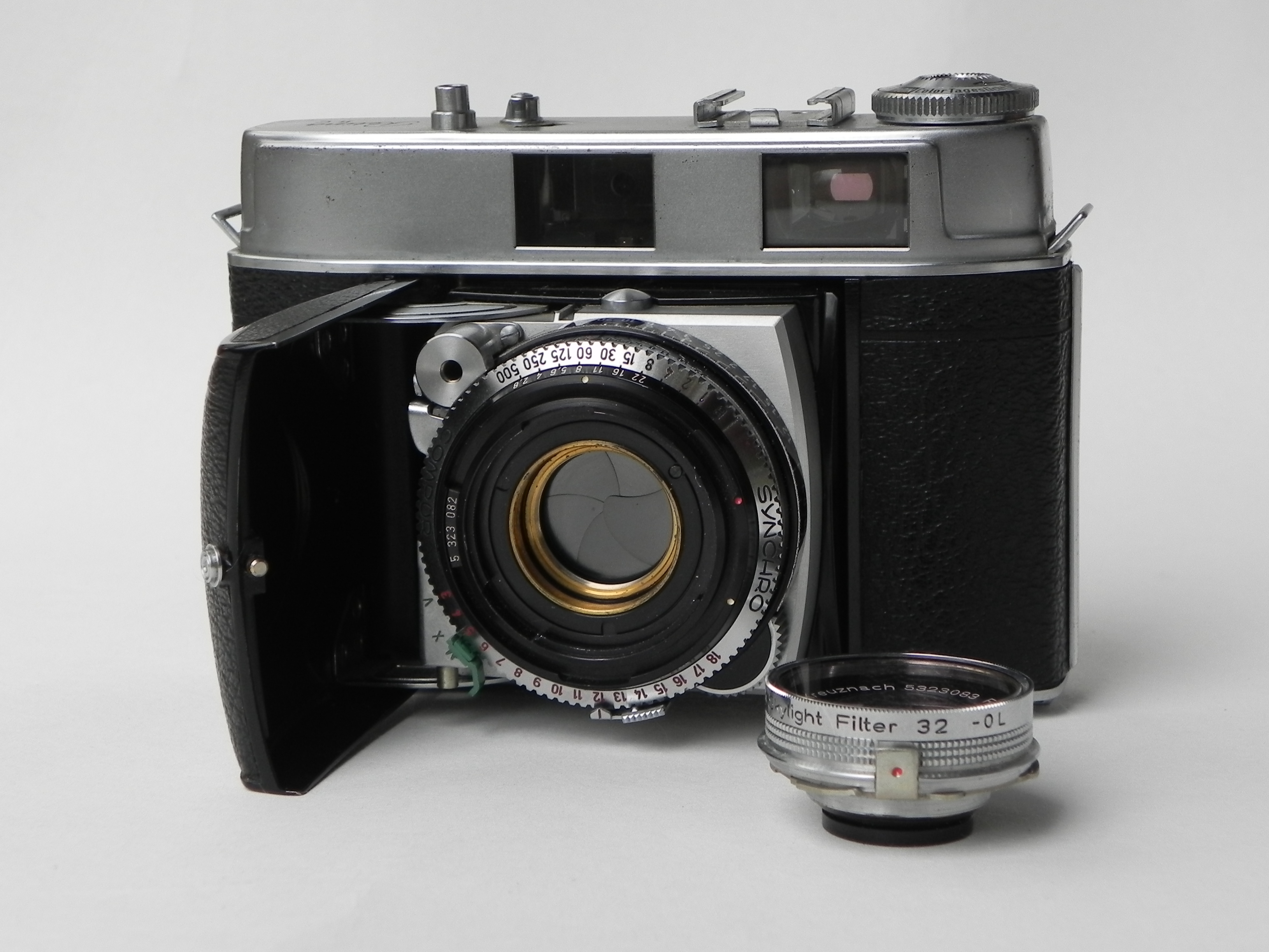
Retina IIC (Type 029) with convertible front lens unit removed, 1957–58

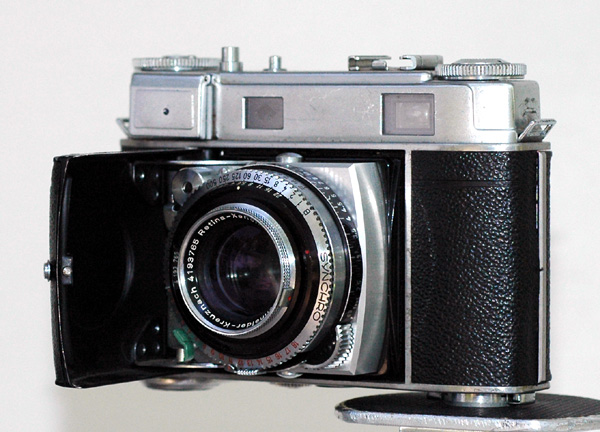
Retina IIIc (Type 021 Ausf. I), 1954–57

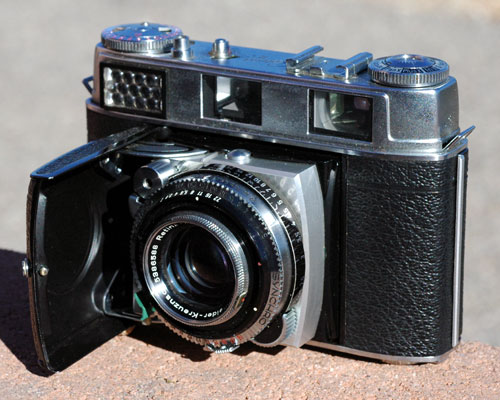
Retina IIIC (Type 028), 1957–60

==== 1950s ====
In January 1951 the Type 015 Retina Ia and Type 016 Retina IIa Type 016 are introduced with COMPUR-RAPID flash synch. shutters. Synchro-Compur shutters with MX flash synch shutters are introduced on the Type 016 Retina IIa in early spring of 1951 and on the Type 015 Retina Ia in June 1951. Production of these two camera continues until spring of 1954.

The Type 018 Retina Ib, Type 020 Retina IIc and Type 021 Ausf I. Retina IIIc are introduced in the spring of 1954 at Photokina in Cologne, Germany. Both the Retina IIc and Retina IIIc were equipped with convertible lenses; the front lens elements were interchangeable to create f:5,6 35mm and f:4 80mm lenses; however, the cameras could not be folded closed with the accessory lenses. Both Retina-Xenon C or Retina-Heligon C lenses were offered on the Type 020 and Type 021 Ausf I. Type 021 Ausf II Retina IIIc was introduced in summer of 1957 with a single range exposure meter. Type 019 Ausf. I Retina IB was also introduced at this time.

The fifth and final generation of folding Retina cameras (with capital-letter B or C suffix) was introduced in 1957, the same year as the Type 025 Retina Reflex system. These last Retina folders included the Type 019 Ausf II Retina IB, Type 029 Retina IIC, and Type 028 Retina IIIC. This group had slightly taller top housings, with upgraded single range exposure meters and the addition of a larger, bright-line viewfinder. The fixed-lens Type 019 Ausf I / Ausf II Retina IB featured an exposure meter, which was not included on the Type 018 Retina Ib. The Type 029 Retina IIC had a rangefinder but no meter though it was also taller housing than the Retina IIc; it was of limited production from 1957 to 1958 and not imported to the United States by Eastman Kodak Co.

==== Postwar lens/shutter combinations ====
These lens/shutter combinations were available on the following postwar folding Retina I Models:

- Rodenstock Ysar 1:3,5 F=5 cm / COMPUR
- Rodenstock Ysar 1:3,5 F=5 cm / COMPUR-RAPID
- Kodak-Anastigmat f:3,5 F=5 cm / COMPUR
- Kodak-Anastigmat Ektar f:3,5 F=5 cm / COMPUR'
- Kodak-Anastigmat Ektar f:3,5 F=5 cm / COMPUR-RAPID
- Schneider Retina-Xenar f:3,5 F=5 cm (uncoated) / COMPUR
- Schneider Retina-Xenar f:3,5 F=5 cm (uncoated) / COMPUR-RAPID
- Schneider Retina-Xenar f;3,5 F=5 cm (coated) / COMPUR-RAPID
- Schneider Retina-Xenar 3,5/5 cm (uncoated) COMPUR-RAPID
- Schneider Retina-Xenar 3,5/5 cm (coated) / COMPUR-RAPID
- Kodak Ektar F:3.5 50mm "Made in USA" / COMPUR
- Kodak Ektar F:3.5 50mm "Made in USA" / COMPUR-RAPID
- /
- Schneider Retina-Xenar 3,5/5 cm (coated) / COMPUR-RAPID (flash sync)
- Schneider Retina-Xenar 1:3,5/50mm / COMPUR-RAPID (no flash sync)
- Schneider Retina-Xenar f:3,5/50mm / COMPUR-RAPID (flash sync)
- Schneider Retina-Xenar f:2,8/50mm / COMPUR-RAPID (flash sync)
- Schneider Retina-Xenar f:2,8/50mm / SYNCHRO-COMPUR
- Kodak Ektar F:3.5 50mm "Made in USA" / COMPUR-RAPID (flash sync)
- Kodak Ektar F:3.5 50mm "Made in USA" / SYNCHRO-COMPUR
- Schneider Retina-Xenar f:3,5/50mm / SYNCHRO-COMPUR
- Schneider Retina-Xenar f:2,8/50mm / SYNCHRO-COMPUR

These lens/shutter combinations were available on the following postwar folding Retina II Models:

- Kodak Ektar F:2 47mm "Made in USA" / COMPUR-RAPID
- Schneider Retina-Xenon f:2 F=5 cm (uncoated) / COMPUR-RAPID
- Schneider Retina-Xenon f:2 F=5 cm (coated) / COMPUR-RAPID
- Schneider Retina-Xenon f:2/50mm (coated) / COMPUR-RAPID
- Rodenstock-Heligon 1:2 f=5 cm (uncoated) / COMPUR-RAPID
- /
- Schneider Retina-Xenon f:2/50mm / COMPUR-RAPID (no flash sync)
- Schneider Retina-Xenon f:2/50mm / COMPUR-RAPID (flash sync)
- Schneider Retina-Xenon f:2/50mm / SYNCHRO-COMPUR
- Rodenstock-Heligon 1:2 F=5 cm (coated) / COMPUR-RAPID (flash sync)
- Rodenstock Retina-Heligon f:2/50mm / COMPUR-RAPID (flash sync)
- Rodenstock Retina-Heligon f:2/50mm / SYNCHRO-COMPUR
- /
- Schneider Retina-Xenon C F:2,8/50mm / SYNCHRO-COMPUR
- Rodenstock Retina-Heligon C F:2,8/50mm / SYNCHRO-COMPUR

These lens/shutter combinations were available on the following postwar folding Retina III Models:

- Schneider Retina-Xenon C F:2,0/50mm / SYNCHRO-COMPUR
- Rodenstock Retina-Heligon C F:2,0/50mm / SYNCHRO-COMPUR
- Rodenstock Retina-Heligon C F:2,8/50mm / SYNCHRO-COMPUR

=== Retina Reflex (SLR) ===
Kodak Retina Reflex cameras

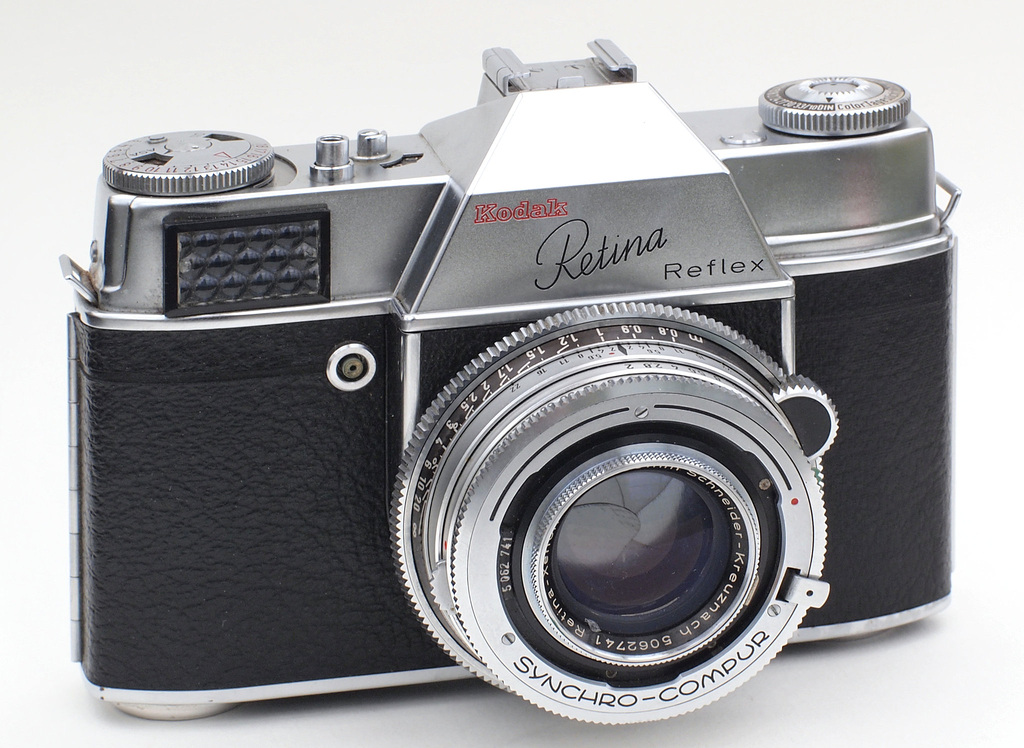
Retina Reflex Type 025, 1957

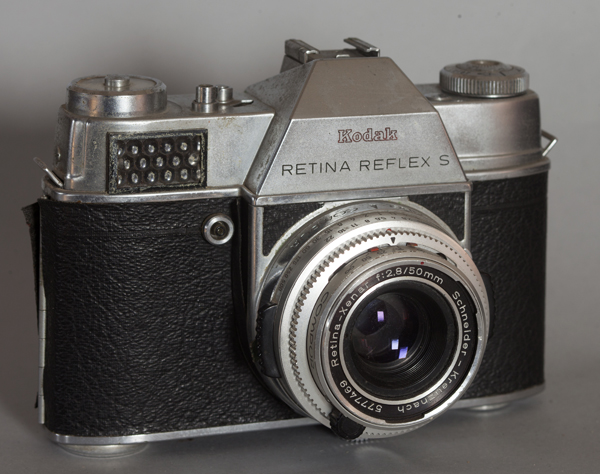
Retina Reflex S Type 034, 1959

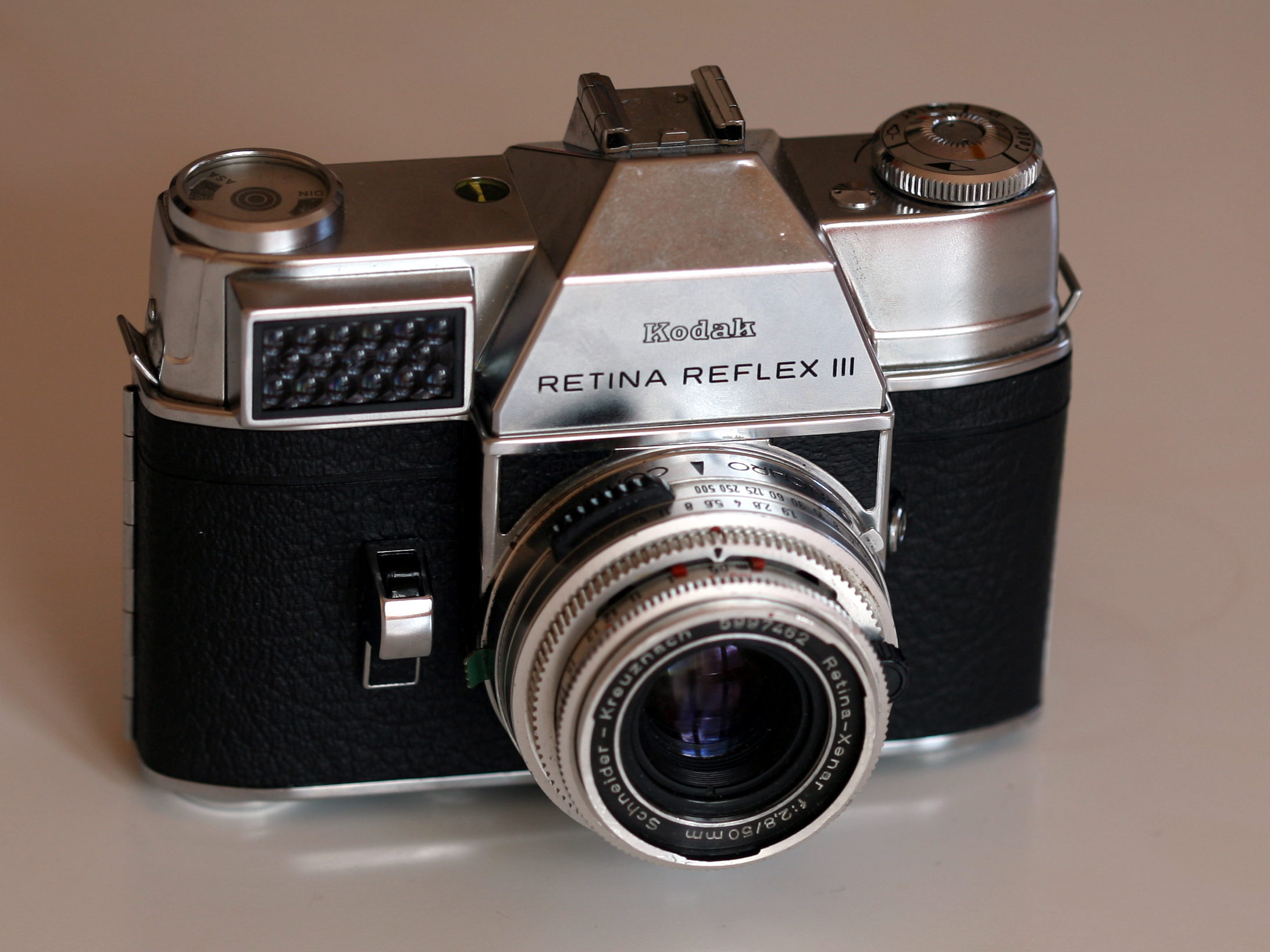
Retina Reflex III Type 041, 1961

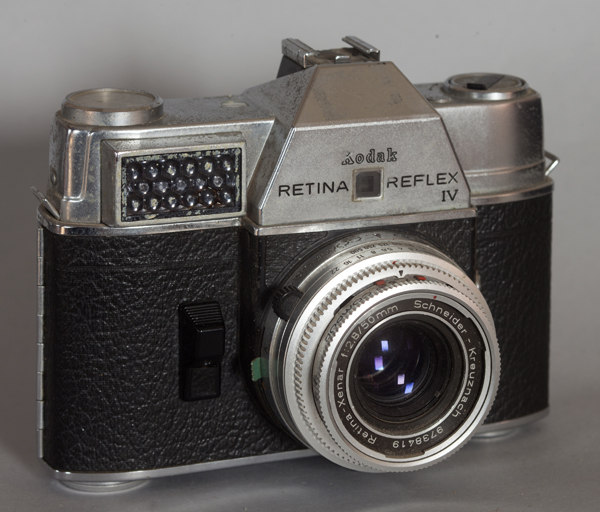
Retina Reflex IV, 1964

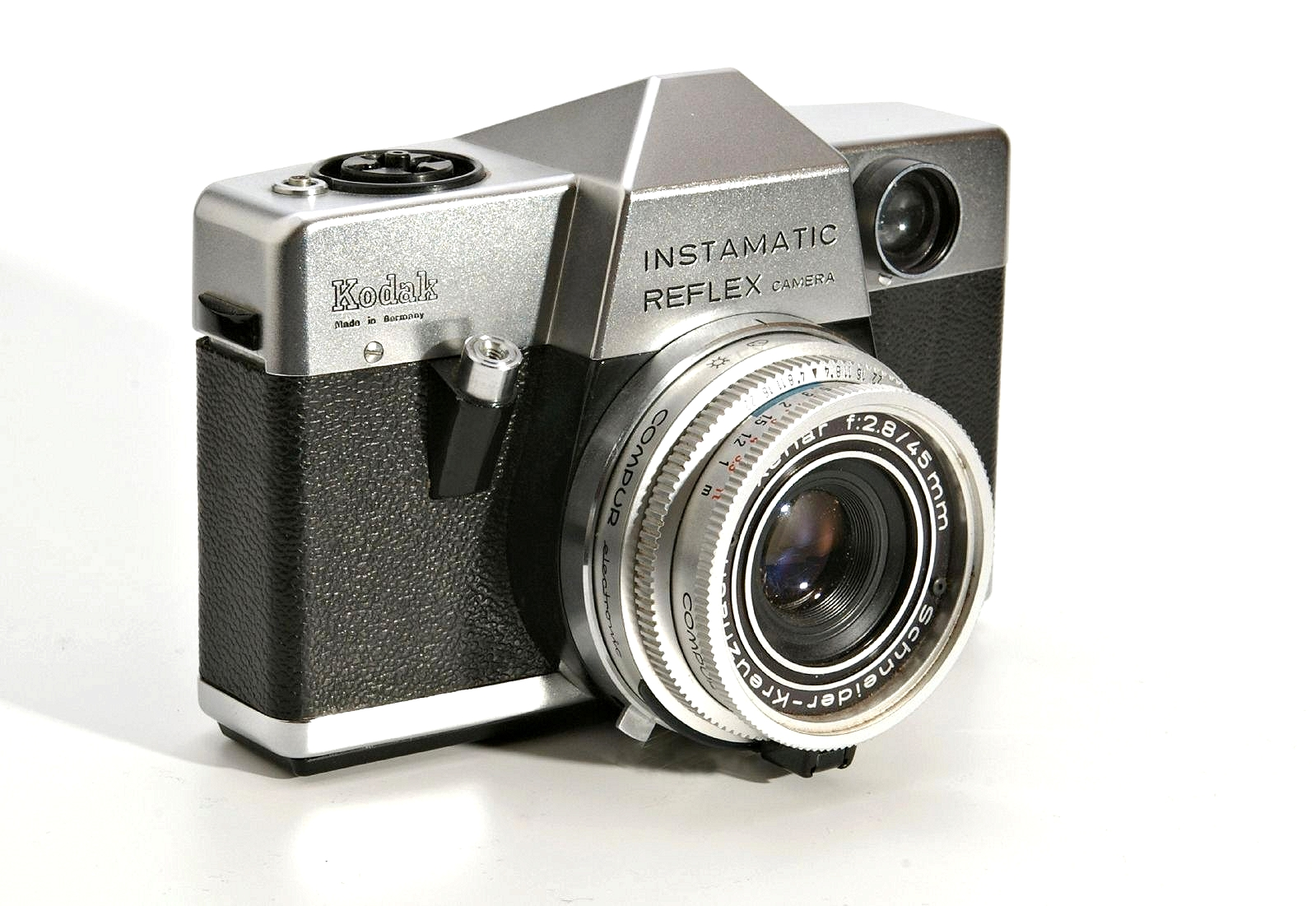
Instamatic Reflex, 1968

The Retina Reflex SLR camera systems were introduced in 1957 and produced in several iterations to 1966. The first model, Type 025 Retina Reflex, shared the "C" series interchangeable front element lenses with the interchangeable Type 020 Retina IIc and Type 021 Ausf I Retina IIIc (35mm, 50mm, and 80mm). Type 025 Retina Reflex had the same uncoupled single range exposure meter of the Type 019 Ausf I Retina IB and the Type 021 Ausf. II Retina IIc, which is later mounted on the Type 019 Ausf. II Retina IB and Type 028 Retina IIIC.

The second generation Type 034 Retina Reflex S of 1959 shared "S" type lenses with the Type 027 Retina IIIS (below), and offered fully coupled metering. With these the entire lens detached allowing for a wider range of focal lengths, 28mm to 200mm. At this point economical Japanese SLRs were becoming available and the Nikon F of 1959 would set the standard for future camera system.

The Reflex III of 1961 and Reflex IV of 1964 brought minor improvements with the former offering a metering needle visible in the finder, and the latter allowing shutter and aperture settings to be visible in the finder. The Reflex IV was produced until 1967. From 1968 to 1974 Kodak AG produced an Instamatic Reflex (SLR) based on the Retina Reflex, accepting the S series lenses, but using instamatic 126 film cartridges and instamatic style flash cubes.

Kodak Retina Reflex cameras
Mount	1950s			1960s										1970s				
Mount	7	8	9	0	1	2	3	4	5	6	7	8	9	0	1	2	3	4
Convertible	Retina Reflex; Type 025																	
DKL-mount			Retina Reflex S Type 034					Retina Reflex IV; Type 051				Instamatic Reflex						
DKL-mount						Retina Reflex III; Type 041												

- Type 025 Retina Reflex (1957–1958), with convertible lenses from Schneider-Kreuznach or Rodenstock
- Type 034 Retina Reflex S (1959–1961), with a DISTINCT RETINA-TYPE DKL-mount lenses from Schneider-Kreuznach and Rodenstock
- Type 041 Retina Reflex III (1961–1964), with a DISTINCT RETINA-TYPE DKL-mount lenses from Schneider-Kreuznach and Rodenstock
- Type 051 Retina Reflex IV (1964–1966), with a DISTINCT RETINA-TYPE DKL-mount lenses from Schneider-Kreuznach and Rodenstock

=== Non-folding Retinas ===
Non-folding Kodak Retina cameras

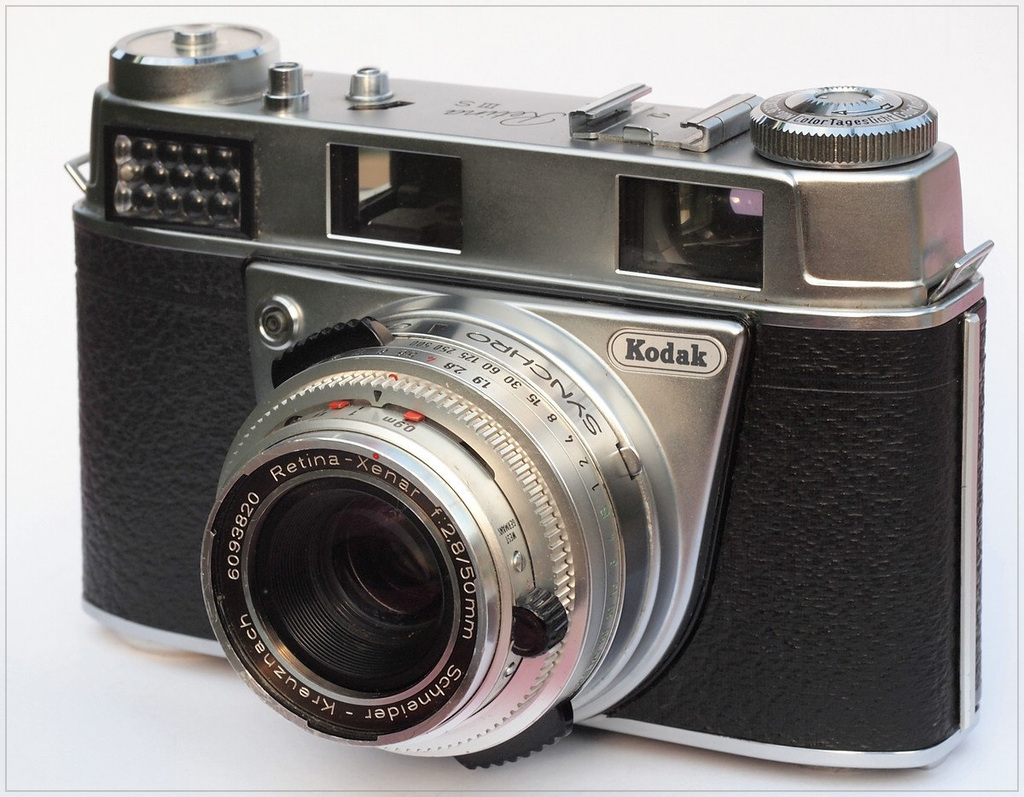
Retina IIIS Type 027 (1958–60)

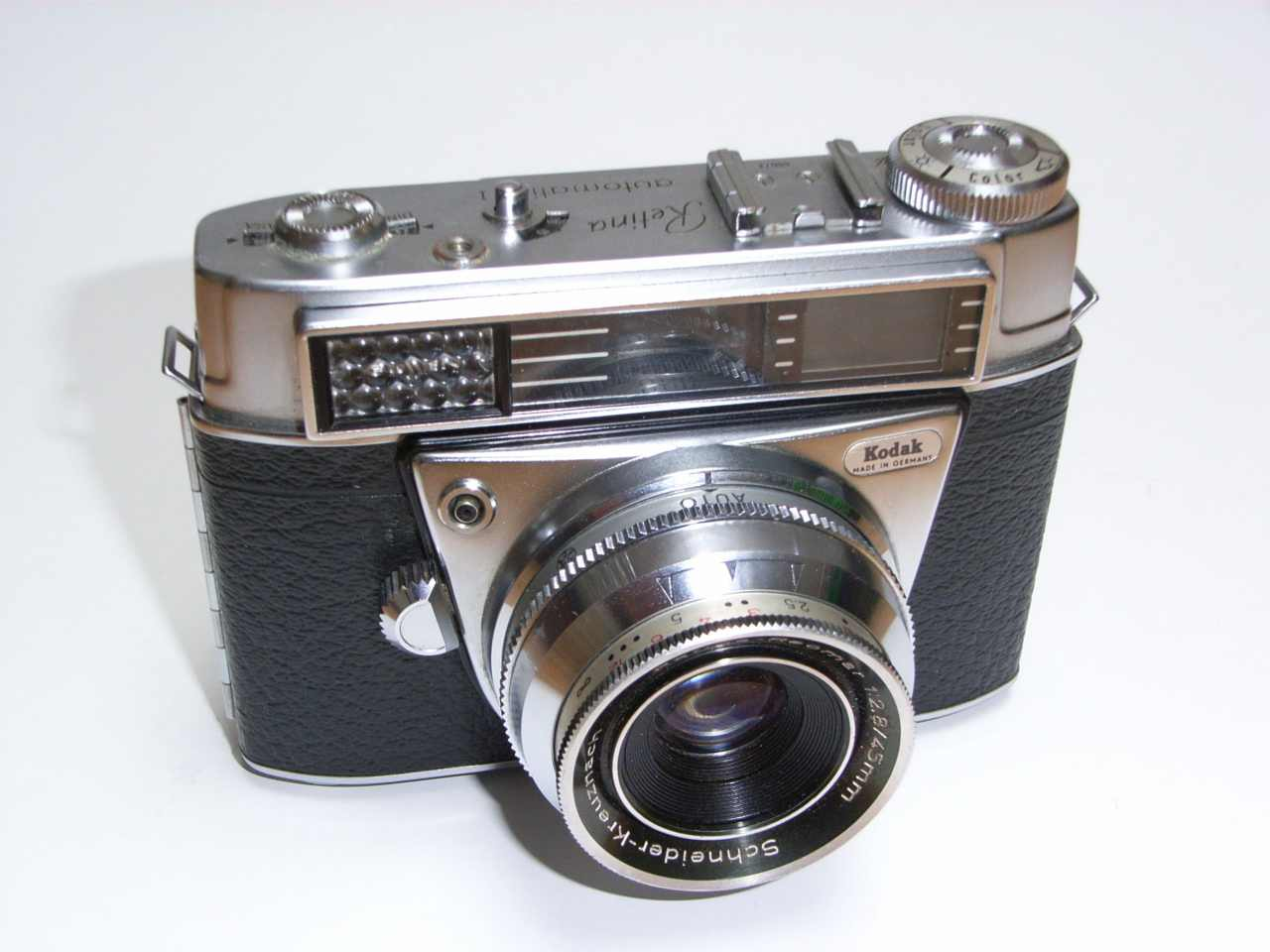
Retina Automatic I Type 038 (1960–62)

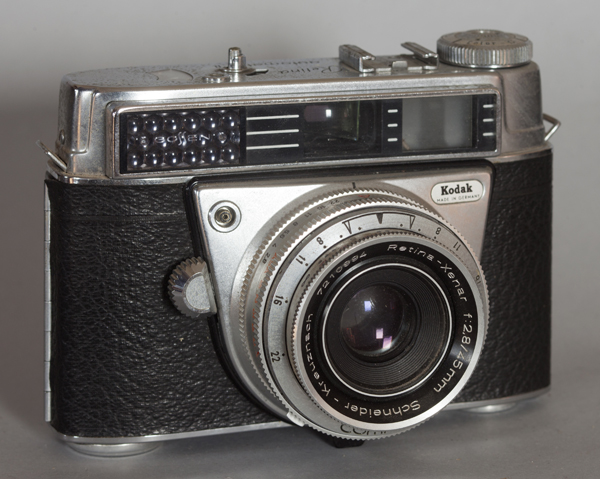
Retina Automatic III Type 039 (1960–63)

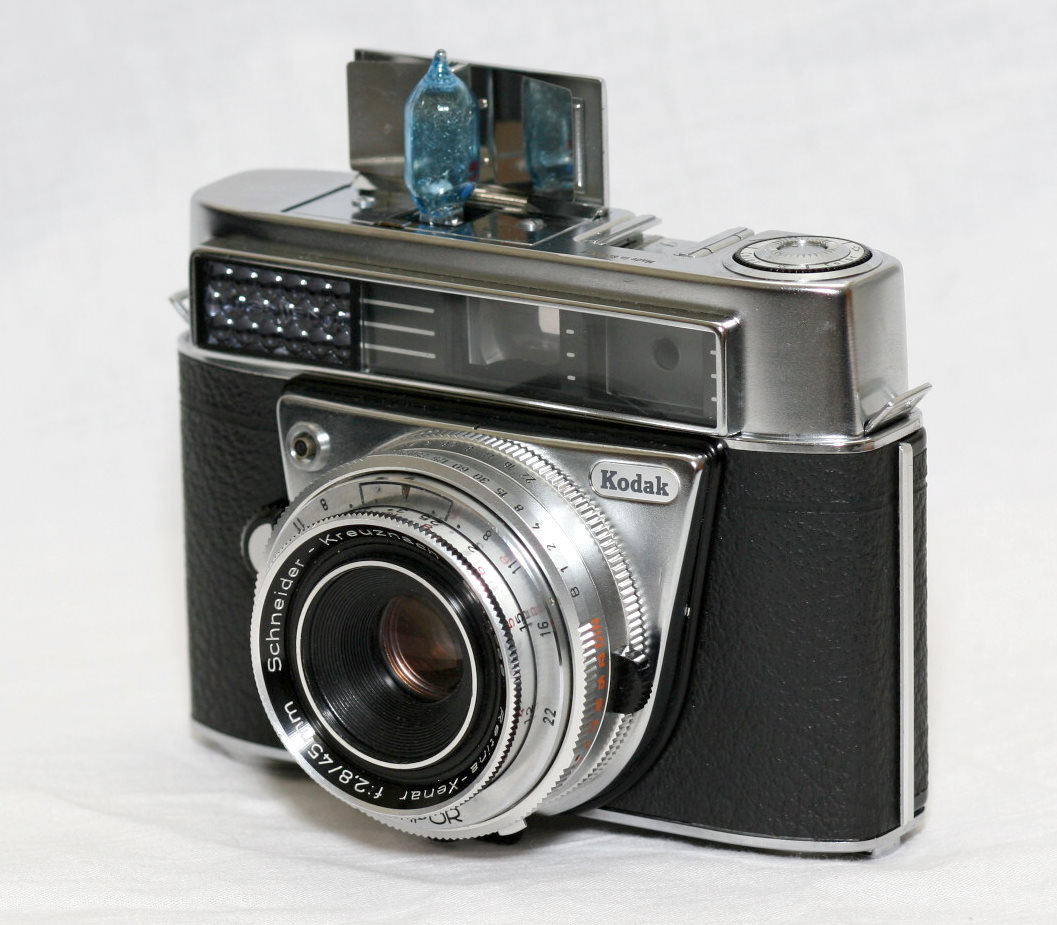
Retina IIF Type 047 (1963–64)

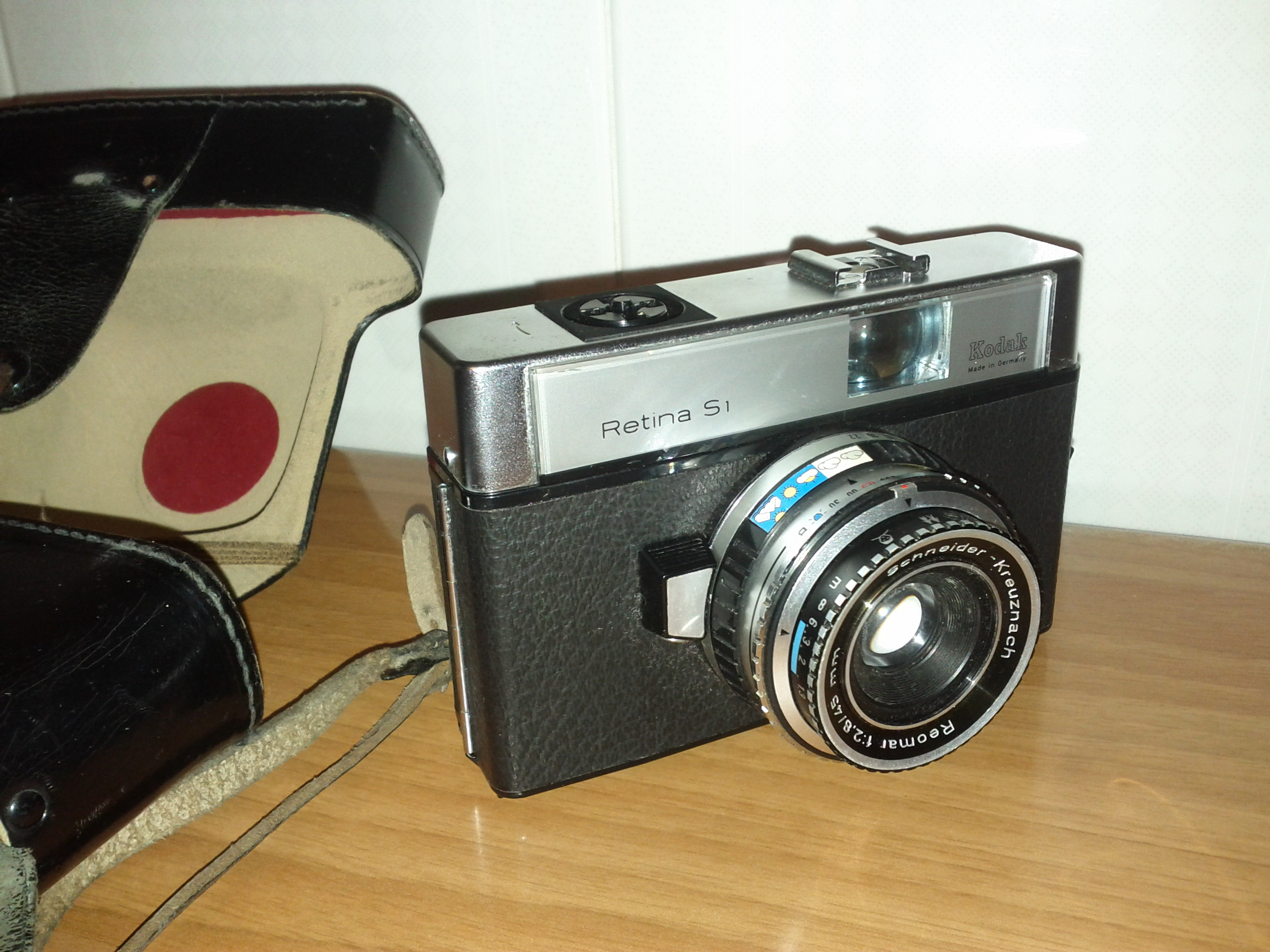
Retina S1 Type 060 (1966-69)

Kodak produced a series of non-folding (rangefinder and viewfinder) cameras under the Retina label between 1958 and 1966. The initial models were very similar to the last folding Retinas, 5th generation (capital letters series). The IIIS Type 27 had interchangeable lenses; however these used the S-Type series lenses of the Retina later Reflex SLRs rather than the more limited C series used by the later folders. The IIS was slightly smaller (Retinette frame) with similar features but did not have interchangeable lenses.

Several models of "Automatic" Retinas followed, on the IIS frame, without interchangeable lenses, but with coupled (automatic)metering, where in auto-mode the meter adjusted the aperture. The Automatic II and Automatic III had an upgraded lens and shutter from the Automatic I. The Automatic I and Automatic II did not have a rangefinder, but the Automatic III had a coupled rangefinder.

The last cameras labeled as Retinas were the plastic-bodied viewfinder Type 060 Retina S1 and Type 061 Retina S2, produced from 1966 to 1969. These were reasonable amateur cameras but not of the quality of prior Retina cameras. The fixed lens/shutters are adjustable for speed, aperture, and focus. Neither offers a rangefinder, though the S2 offers coupled metering.

Non-folding Kodak Retina cameras
Mount	1950s		1960s									
Mount	8	9	0	1	2	3	4	5	6	7	8	9
DKL-mount	Retina IIIS; Type 027											
Fixed lens		Retina IIS; Type 024			Retina I BS; Type 040							
Fixed lens			Retina Automatic I Type 038			Retina IF; Type 046			Retina S1; Type 060			
Fixed lens			Retina Automatic II; Type 032			Retina IIF; Type 047			Retina S2; Type 061			
Fixed lens			Retina Automatic III; Type 039									

=== Retinettes ===
Kodak also manufactured the Retinette series of lesser-featured cameras from 1939 to 1960 in a variety of folding and rigid models.
