= Kodak Retinette =

Series of American cameras

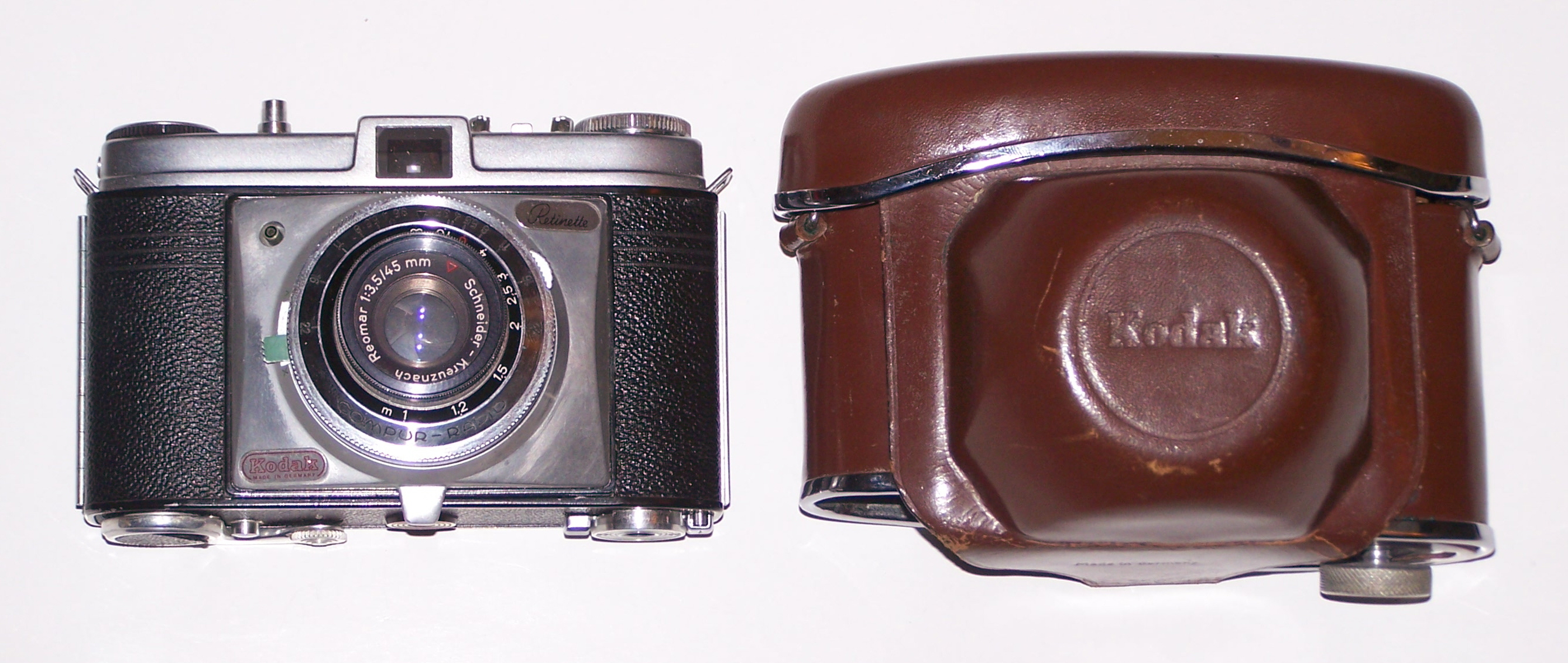
The first rigid model of Retinette (Model 022) introduced in 1954. Lens is Schneider Kreuznach Reomar and the shutter is Compur–Rapid. Leather carrying case was included with the camera. A 29.5 mm skylight filter is attached to the lens. The lever on the left of the lens at 9 o' clock is the self-timer actuator. Construction of the body is all-metal, including the film advance lever at the bottom. The lens mounting plate is rectangular.

Kodak Retinette is a classic series of cameras manufactured by the Eastman Kodak company. They were introduced in 1939 as a less expensive alternative to the Kodak Retina series. The first models were of the folding type using bellows and their lenses had three elements as compared to the four element Tessar lenses (Greek: Tessera meaning four) of the Retina series.

The first non-folding (rigid) variant was introduced in 1954 with the model 022. They most often featured Schneider Kreuznach Reomar lenses but, sometimes, Rodenstock Reomar lenses were installed. The Rodenstock lenses were based on the original Schneider Kreuznach triplet (three optical element) design. Kodak Anastigmat Angénieux lenses were also used especially for the French market. Common shutters included Compur–Rapid as well as various Pronto, Vero and Kodak models.

== Models ==
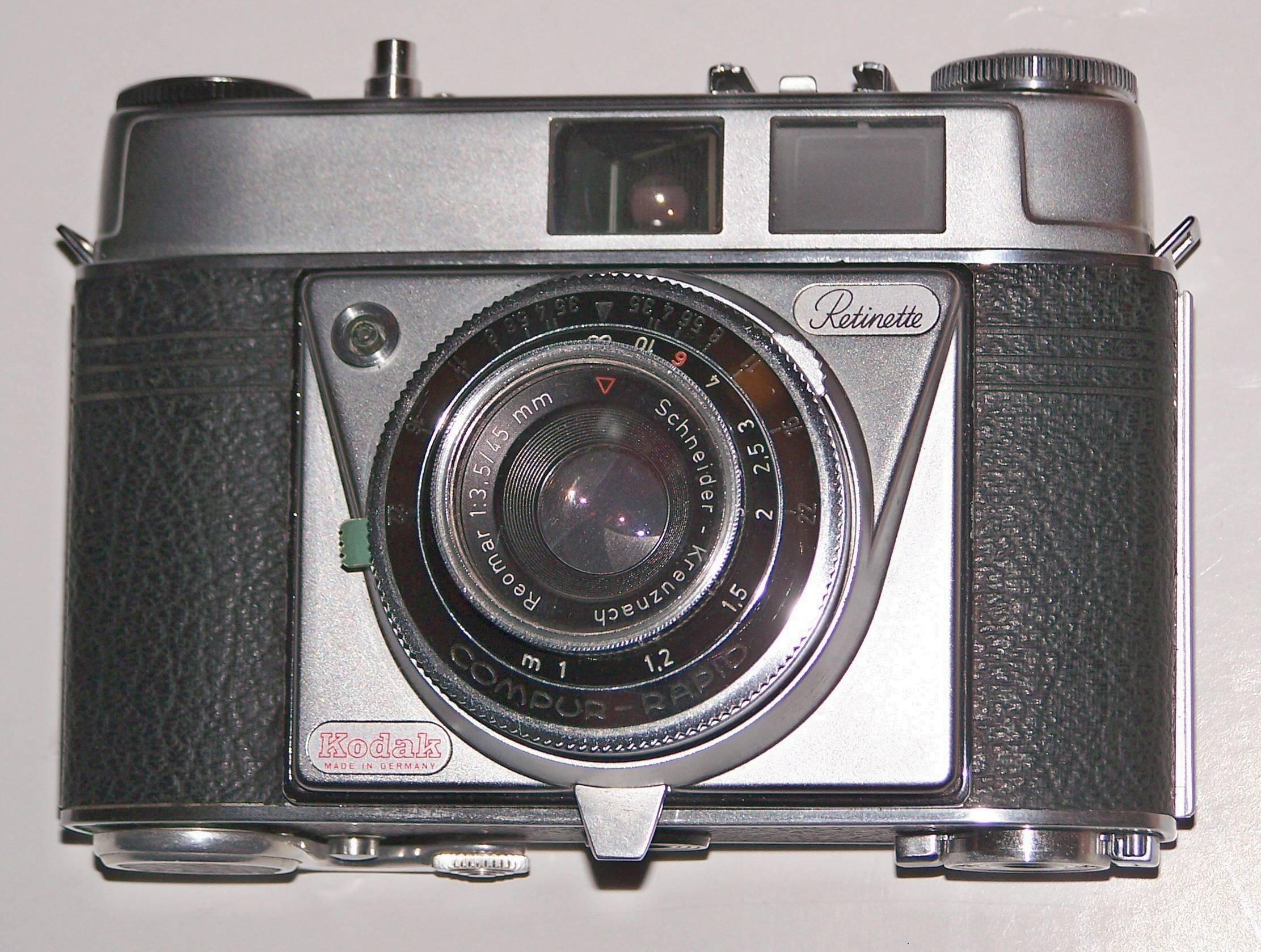
Retinette model 030 (1958)

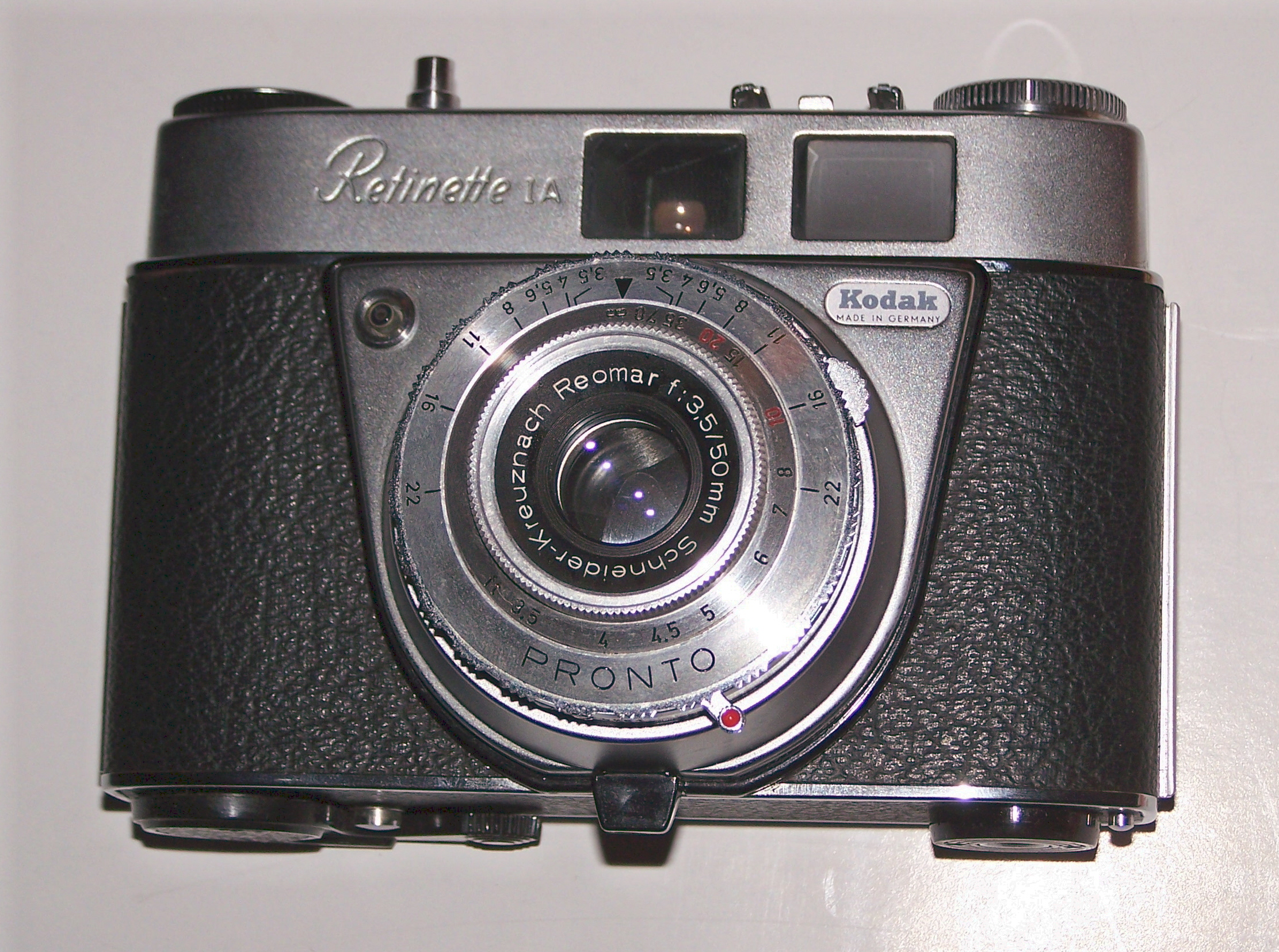
Retinette IA with Pronto shutter

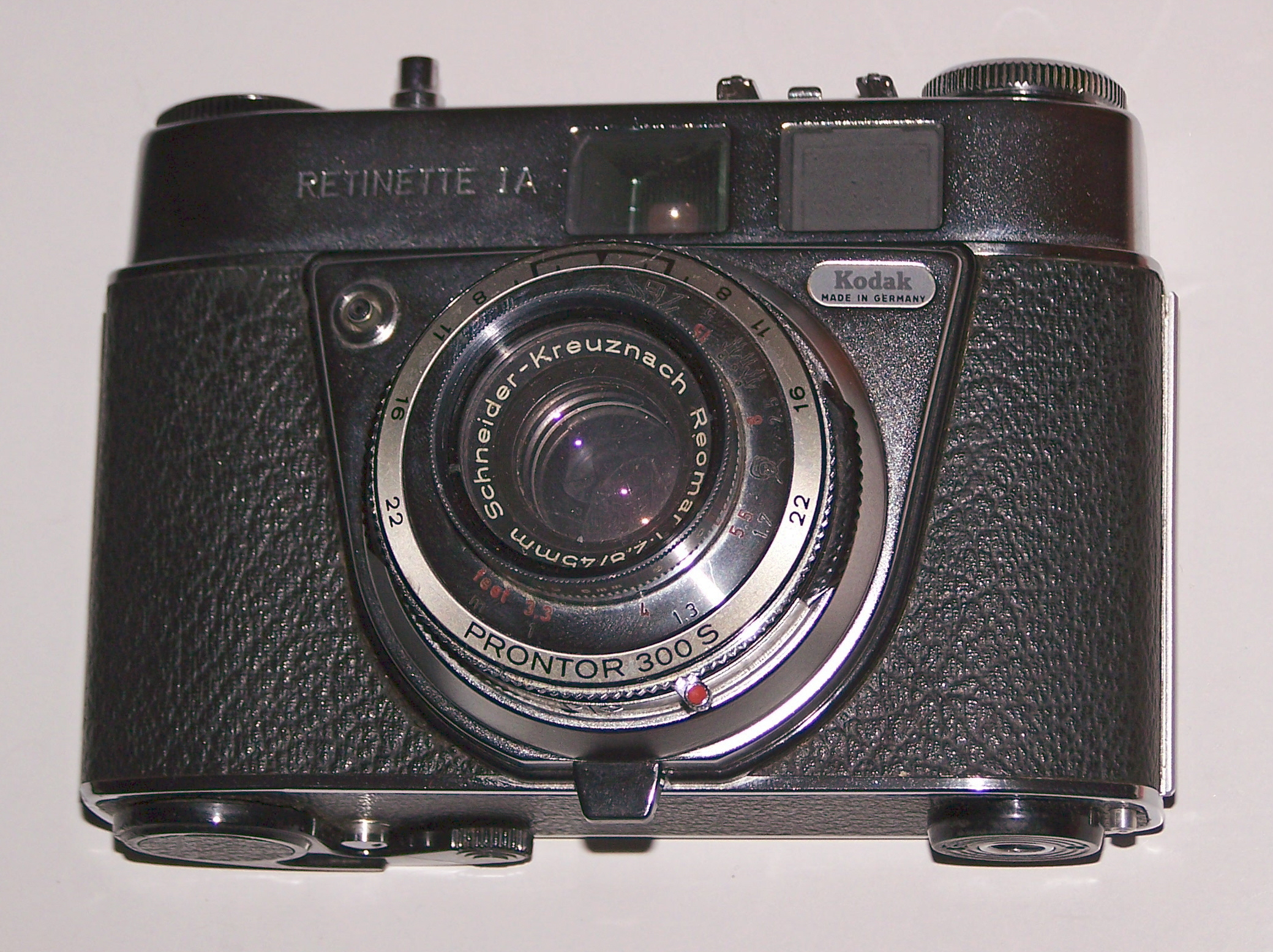
Retinette IA with Prontor 300 S shutter

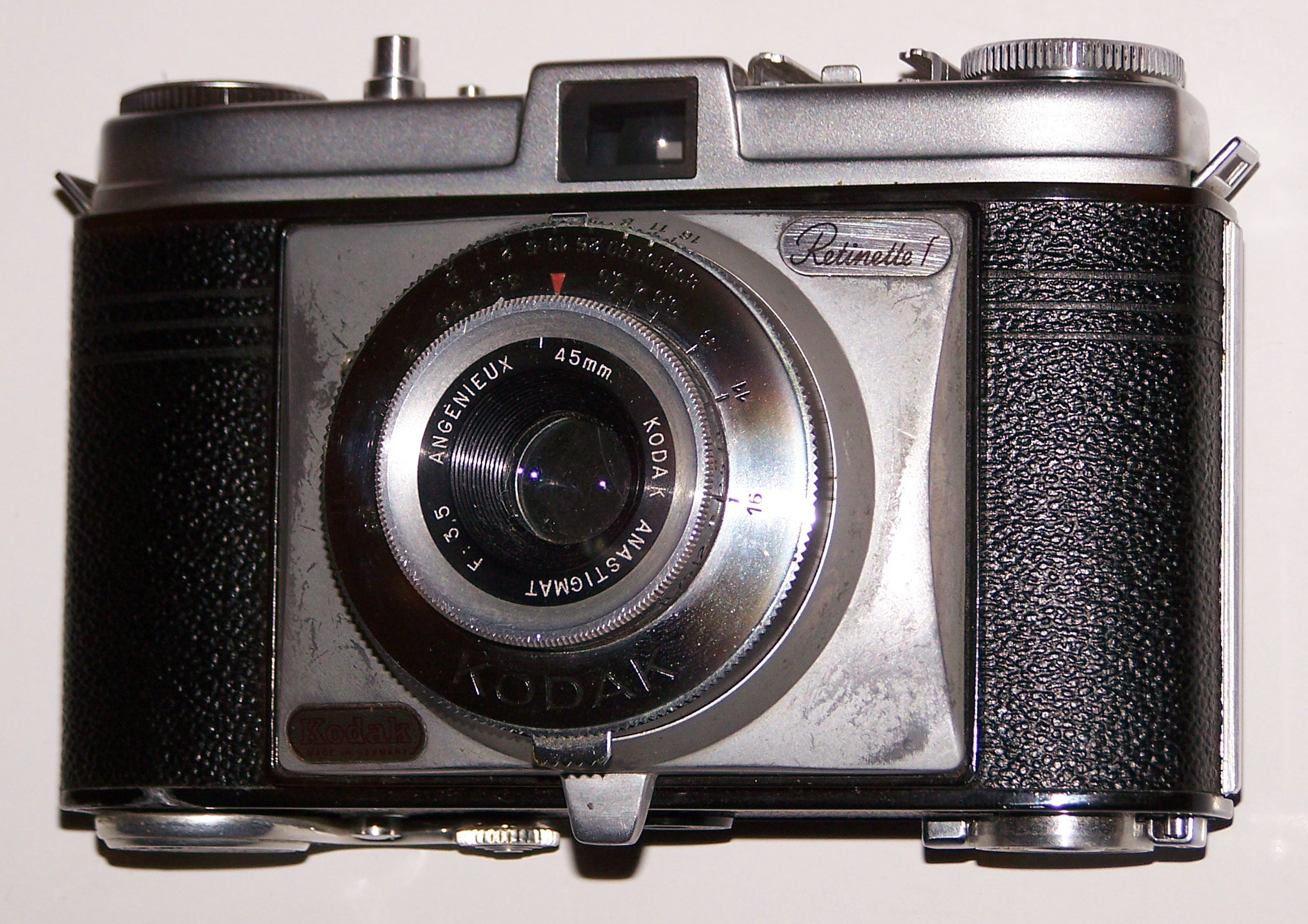
Kodak Retinette model 022 French Edition (Retinette f). The lens is Kodak Anastigmat Angénieux and the shutter is Kodak

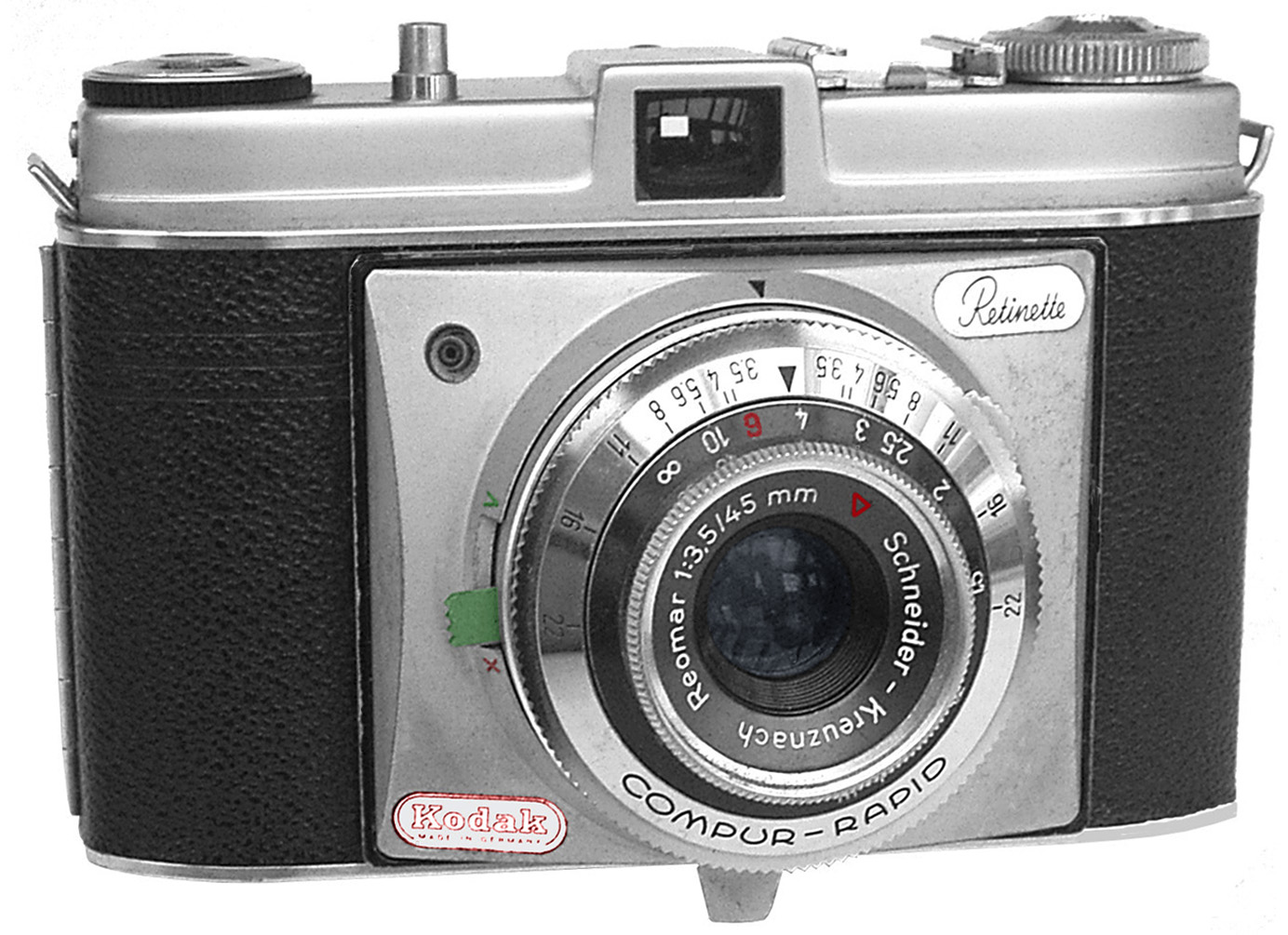
Kodak Retinette model 022 German Edition

.
