= Kodak Retina Reflex =

SLR photo camera

Kodak Retina Reflex series
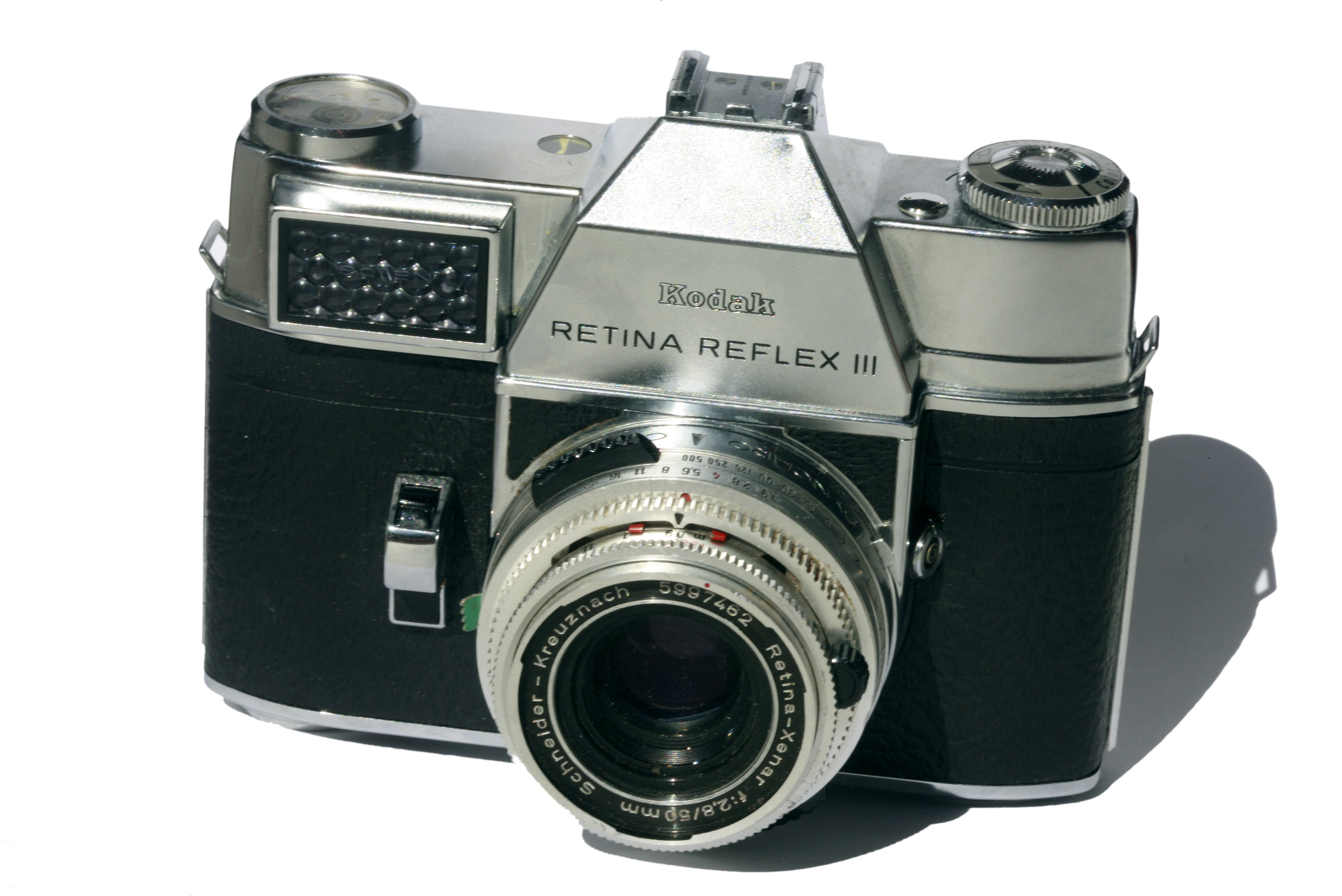
- Retina Reflex III

Overview
- Type: 35mm SLR camera
- Released: April 1957

Lens
- Lens mount: model specific: Retina convertible or DKL-mount lens bayonet

Sensor/medium
- Film advance: manual
- Film rewind: manual

Focusing
- Focus: manual

Exposure/metering
- Exposure: manual

Flash
- Flash: cold shoe

The Kodak Retina Reflex is a discontinued series of four single-lens reflex cameras made by Kodak in Germany between 1957 and 1974, as part of the Kodak Retina line of 35mm film cameras.

== Overview ==
The earliest Retina Reflex (Type 025, 1957) uses the convertible lens system introduced with the Kodak Retina IIc/IIIc in 1954. The successor cameras, starting with the Retina Reflex S (Type 034, 1959), use DKL-mount lenses, introduced with the Retina IIIS of 1958. The Retina Reflex brand was discontinued in 1966, then revived as the Instamatic Reflex in 1968, using the same DKL-mount lenses with the easy-loading Kodapak line of 126 film cartridges. The Instamatic Reflex was discontinued in 1974.

Kodak Retina Reflex cameras
Mount	1950s			1960s										1970s				
Mount	7	8	9	0	1	2	3	4	5	6	7	8	9	0	1	2	3	4
Convertible	Retina Reflex; Type 025																	
DKL-mount			Retina Reflex S Type 034					Retina Reflex IV; Type 051				Instamatic Reflex						
DKL-mount						Retina Reflex III; Type 041												

Retina Reflex summary
Model	Shutter	Meter	Film speeds
Reflex (Type 025)	Synchro-Compur, 1–1/500	uncoupled, EV 2–18	
Reflex S (Type 034)	Synchro-Compur, 1–1/500	coupled, EV 2–18	
Reflex III (Type 041)	Synchro-Compur, 1–1/500	coupled, EV 2–18	DIN 6–36 (ASA 3–3200)
Reflex IV (Type 051)	Synchro-Compur, 1–1/500	coupled, EV 2–18	DIN 11–32 (ASA 10–1250)

== Convertible lens camera ==
=== Retina Reflex ===
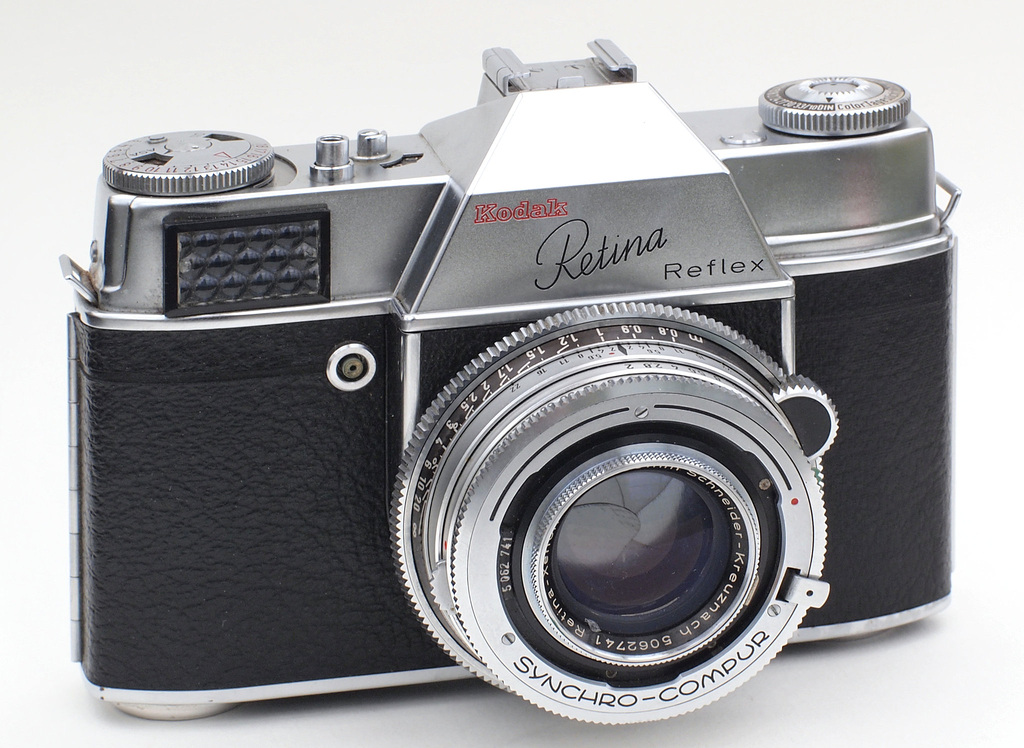
Retina Reflex (Type 025) with Schneider-Kreuznach Retina-Xenon standard front lens components

The Kodak Type 025 Retina Reflex is an SLR camera that uses convertible lenses (German: Wechselobjektiv), made by Kodak Stuttgart, Germany. It was made between Spring 1957 and October 1958. Like many 35 mm SLR cameras of West German heritage it is equipped with a leaf shutter instead of a focal plane shutter. It was named Type 025 Retina Reflex since it inherited several features from the contemporary Retina rangefinder cameras, like the Retina IIIc: The film advance and exposure counting system, the film channel, the selenium meter, and the focusing mechanics of the lenses. Even the Synchro-Compur shutter is very similar to the earlier designs.

The convertible lenses of early Retina reflex models are equipped with interchangeable front elements and a fixed set of elements that remain on the body. Later models had fully interchangeable lenses. In these first models, the front three elements are contained in a cell that bayonets into the front of the lens assembly. The standard front cell can be replaced with one of three Schneider components - an 80mm and two different 35mm components. The rear part of the lens (which is a permanent part of the camera body) contains the focusing apparatus, the entire Synchro-Compur shutter, the aperture, and the three rear elements, which are common to all 4 lenses. This interchangeable front component concept was introduced in 1954 with the folding Retina IIc and IIIc models. Care must be exercised when using front components other than the standard (50mm) one, as it is possible to set the body mounted aperture wider than the maximum aperture of the lens (i.e. f/2 instead of f/4 or f/5.6).

A similar system was introduced in 1953 with the Contaflex (SLR). The Retina Reflex is, on rare occasions, found with very similar lenses made by Rodenstock. As the Rodenstock front components are not compatible with the Schneider rear component (and vice versa), minor changes were made to the bayonet mount for each manufacturer. These interchangeable Retina lens components can also be used on the Retina IIc, IIC, IIIc, and IIIC rangefinder cameras.

The camera offers the convenience of image composition with wide open aperture. The aperture is stopped down to the selected value after the shutter is released. After exposure the mirror stays up until the bottom-mounted single-stroke film advance lever is again wound. Focusing is via a ground glass screen with a central split-image rangefinder.

The camera's top plate has the manually set frame counter, the shutter release, the film rewind knob with film reminder dial, the exposure needle window, meter adjustment knob with EV and ASA/DIN scales, the film (advance) release button, the frame (counter) advance slider, and the accessory shoe. The bottom plate contains the tripod socket, the film advance lever, the back release latch, and the film rewind release button.

In use, the Retina Reflex frame counter works down from 35 (or 20) to 0, at which point the film advance locks. While this is convenient for the user and does prevent torn film sprockets at the end of a roll, setting the counter up properly at the beginning of a roll is complex, awkward, and time-consuming. This is a typical example of much of Retina engineering - complex and ingenious, but perhaps over-done.

The non-coupled selenium cell exposure meter reads out in exposure values (EVs) only. The camera is then set to the proper EV setting via an easily reached aperture release tab, though the EV scale itself is rather inconveniently located on the underside of the lens assembly. Once the aperture release tab is set and released, the shutter ring is coupled to the aperture ring - moving the shutter ring automatically moves the aperture ring, so that the same exposure value is maintained. In other words, when in use, the camera is normally locked into one EV setting until the aperture release tab is pressed. Needless to say this can be confusing to those unfamiliar with the camera.

All the Retina Reflex cameras are remarkably complex instruments and quite heavy for their size. The Retina Reflex originally sold in 1958 for US$215 (equivalent to $2,400 in 2025). Approximately 65,000 were made.

=== Lenses for the Retina Reflex ===
The standard Retina-Xenon lens is a 50 mm lens with a different maximum aperture, depending on the camera. The maximum aperture of the standard Retina-Xenon fitted to the IIc/IIC was f/2.8, while the IIIc/IIIC was equipped with a faster f/2 version. The Retina Reflex was equipped with either a Schneider-Kreuznach Retina-Xenon or a Rodenstock Retina-Heligon, both f/2. For each camera, the standard lens is a six-element, four-group Double-Gauss lens split into two parts: a set of three front elements that can be removed and a permanently-fixed set of three rear elements, set behind the aperture and shutter.

Retina "C" convertible lens system diagrams

In the Retina convertible lens system, which is used with the Retina Reflex and earlier Retina IIc, IIC, IIIc, and IIIC rangefinder cameras, the same set of three permanently-fixed rear elements are shared with the standard lens and the user exchanges the front set of lens elements to modify the focal length. There are two groups of accessory front element sets: a wide-angle group which has a focal length of 35 mm and a maximum aperture of either f/4 or f/5.6, and a telephoto group which has a focal length of 80 mm and a maximum aperture of f/4. For the Retina Reflex, the wide-angle 35 mm f/5.6 unit could be fitted, but this combination was not recommended as the resulting image on the ground glass screen would be dim and hard to focus. There are six distinct front lens units in total from the two manufacturers; each of the wide-angle and telephoto front lens units include six elements in four groups.

Users were cautioned to stay with the same manufacturer for the front conversion lens units: that is, cameras originally equipped with the Schneider-Kreuznach Retina-Xenon are intended to be used with the Retina-Curtar-Xenon or Retina-Longar-Xenon front lens units exclusively, while those originally equipped with the Rodenstock Retina-Heligon were advised to use Retina-Heligon wide-angle and telephoto front lens units. In addition, the front and rear standard lens units were matched, and the serial number on the lens should match the serial number engraved inside the outer bayonet ring.

When equipped with either of the telephoto (80 mm) lens units, the minimum focusing distance is 6.5 ft (2.0 m). Kodak sold a close-up lens labeled "T 1/60" (denoting application, diopter, and attachment thread size) that extended the minimum focusing distance to 3.5 ft (1.1 m).

Retina convertible lens summary
Focal length	Mfr.	Name	Construction		Aperture	Focus	Filter size
Focal length	Mfr.	Name	Front	Rear	Aperture	Focus	Filter size
35 mm	Schneider Kreuznach	Retina-Curtar-Xenon C	6e/4g	3e/2g	f/4	0.6 m (2.0 ft)–∞	60 mm
35 mm	Rodenstock	Retina-Heligon C	6e/4g	3e/2g	f/4	0.6 m (2.0 ft)–∞	60 mm
35 mm	Schneider Kreuznach	Retina-Curtar-Xenon C	6e/4g	3e/2g	f/5.6	0.6 m (2.0 ft)–∞	32 mm
35 mm	Rodenstock	Retina-Heligon C	6e/4g	3e/2g	f/5.6	0.6 m (2.0 ft)–∞	32 mm
50 mm	Schneider Kreuznach	Retina-Xenon C	3e/2g	3e/2g	f/2	0.8 m (2.6 ft)–∞	32 mm
50 mm	Rodenstock	Retina-Heligon C	3e/2g	3e/2g	f/2	0.8 m (2.6 ft)–∞	32 mm
50 mm	Schneider Kreuznach	Retina-Xenon C	3e/2g	3e/2g	f/2.8	0.8 m (2.6 ft)–∞	32 mm
50 mm	Rodenstock	Retina-Heligon C	3e/2g	3e/2g	f/2.8	0.8 m (2.6 ft)–∞	32 mm
80 mm	Schneider Kreuznach	Retina-Longar-Xenon C	6e/4g	3e/2g	f/4	2.0 m (6.6 ft)–∞	60 mm
80 mm	Rodenstock	Retina-Heligon C	6e/4g	3e/2g	f/4	2.0 m (6.6 ft)–∞	60 mm

== Interchangeable (DKL-mount) lens cameras ==
=== Retina Reflex S ===
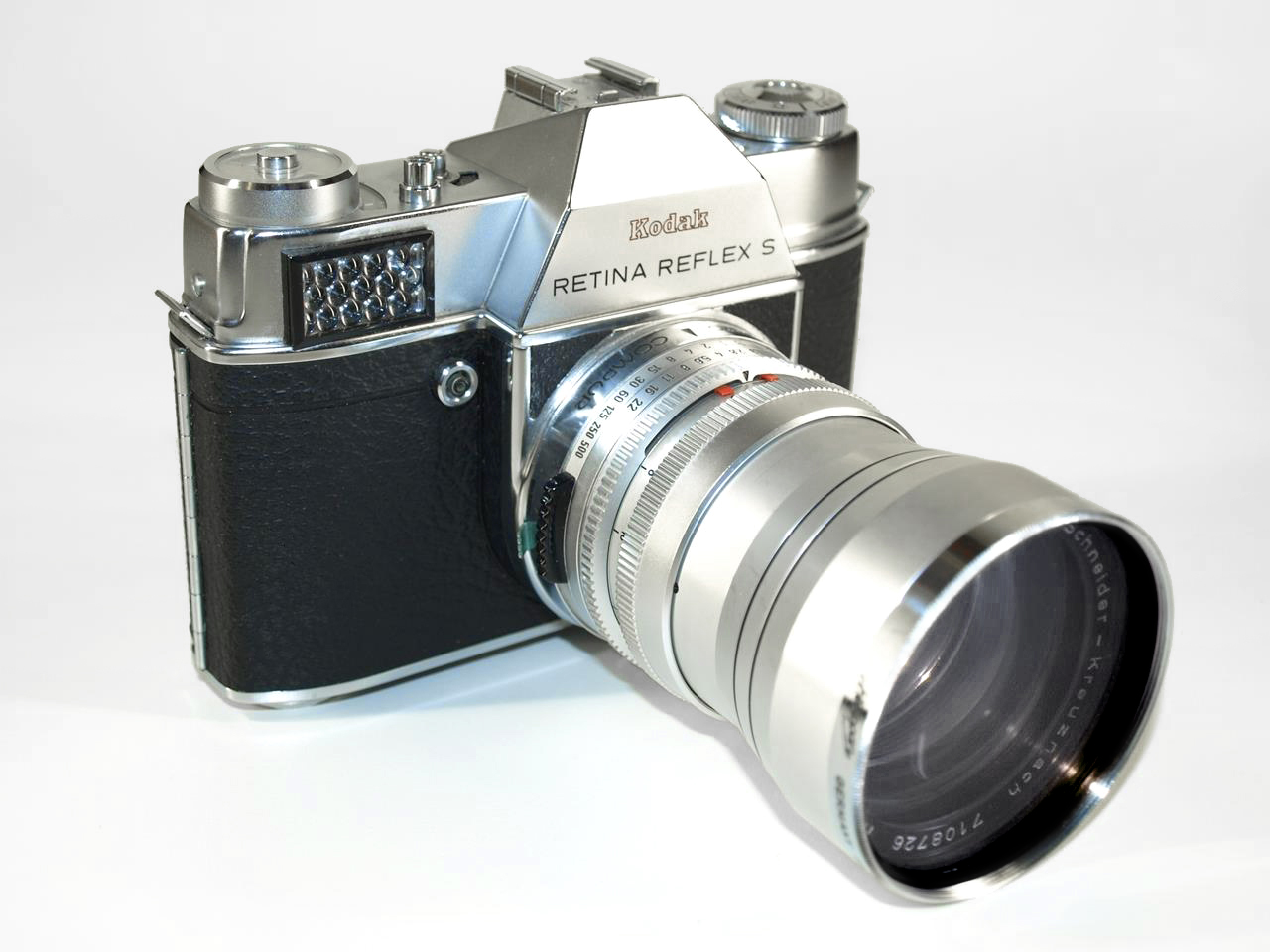
Retina Reflex S with Schneider-Kreuznach 200 mm f/4.8 lens

Introduced in 1959, the Type 034 Retina Reflex S was a major redesign of the original Retina Reflex. The major difference is its use of fully interchangeable lenses, the same lenses that were made for the Kodak Retina IIIS rangefinder camera. The lens mount is commonly referred to as the Deckel mount, after the manufacturer of Compur leaf shutters. This same mount, with minor differences, was also used by a number of other German camera makers, including Braun and Voigtländer. It was also used in the later Retina Reflex III, Retina Reflex IV, and the Kodak Instamatic Reflex. As for the original Retina Reflex, lenses were available from both Schneider and Rodenstock, but this time the lenses had identical bayonet mounts.

The shutter is a Synchro-Compur behind the lens unit, which is part of the camera body. The aperture is now in the interchangeable lenses, which eliminates the problem of setting the wrong aperture on the original Retina Reflex. Speed are from 1 sec. to 1/500th plus bulb. It features M and X syncs and a self-timer.

What was the meter adjustment knob on the top plate is now a fixed housing for the ASA/DIN scale. The selenium cell exposure meter is now coupled to a "setting wheel" located on the very bottom of the lens mount. This setting wheel sets adjusts the camera's exposure value (EV) by changing (in a most complex fashion) the aperture and/or shutter rings at the same time that it changes the depth-of-field pointers on the camera's lens. When another button (located on the top plate) is pushed simultaneously, the setting wheel is also used to set the exposure meter's ASA/DIN setting.

The top plate, bottom plate, and camera body are otherwise nearly identical to the Retina Reflex.

The Retina Reflex S originally sold in 1959 for US$235 (equivalent to $2,600 in 2025). Approximately 78,000 were made.

=== Retina Reflex III ===
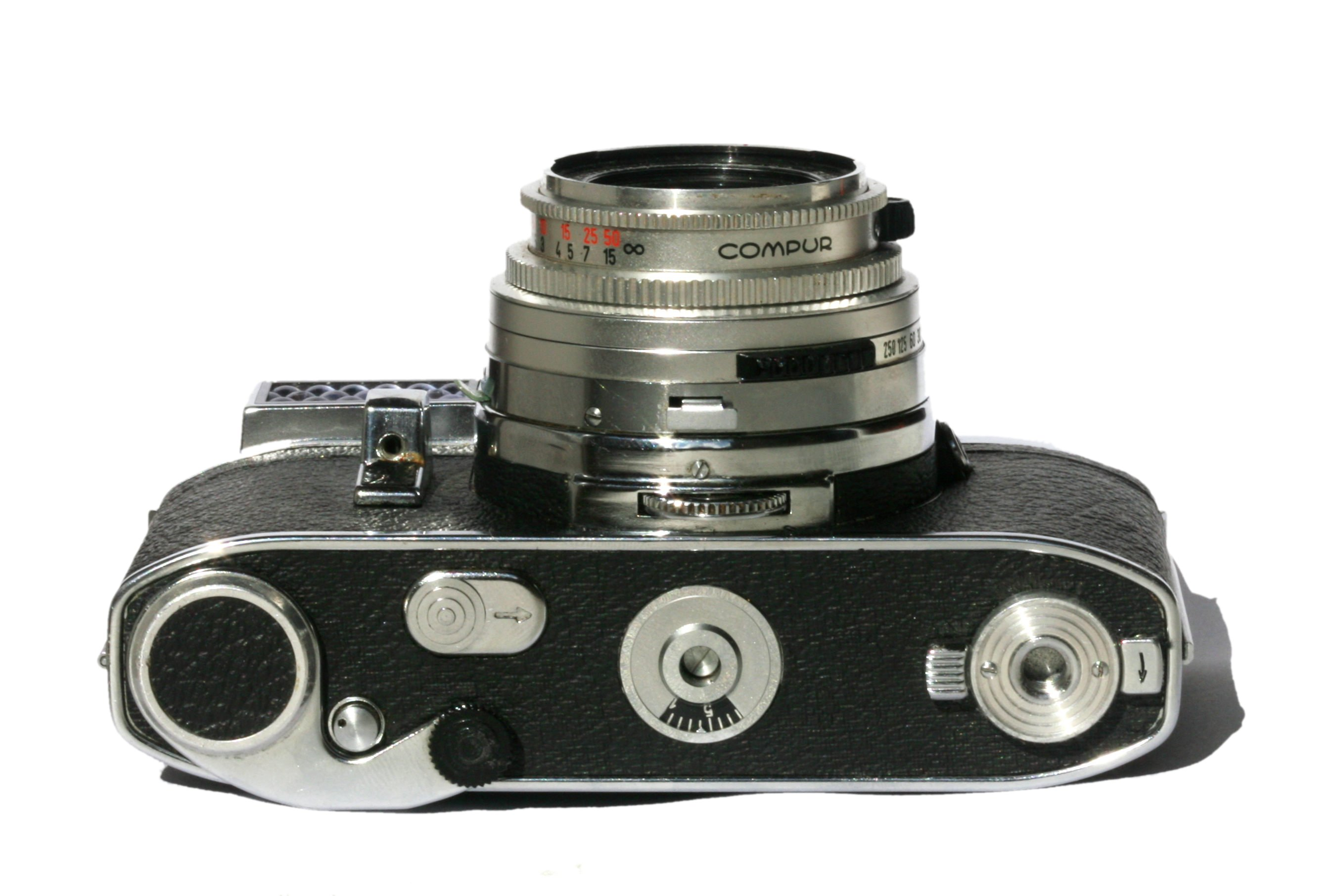
Bottom of the Retina Reflex III with the winding lever, the frame counter, the counter advance button and the back opening

A later variant is the Type 041 Retina Reflex III. It was made from 1960 to 1964.

Its match-needle meter instrument scale is visible in the viewfinder as well as on the top plate. The camera was originally equipped with the same coupled selenium meter as the Reflex S, but after 1962 a larger one was fitted, again made by Gossen. The Reflex III features the same "setting wheel" and interlocking aperture/shutter rings as the Reflex S. As it was fashion in the early 1960s the shutter release button on top was replaced by a shutter release shifter beside the lens mount. The film advance release button was eliminated, that function being incorporated in the frame reset slider, which was moved to the bottom plate along with the (still) manually reset frame counter. The ASA setting button was moved from the ASA dial to the spot vacated by the release button.

This redesign made a new camera case design necessary, leaving additional space for the frame counter, and the frame reset slider. The Retina Reflex cases were already something special before since the film advance lever (Reflex) and aperture/shutter setting wheel (Reflex S) are located on the bottom. The photo shows just how complex the Retina case had become.

The Reflex III has the same aperture/shutter setting wheel (which Kodak called simply the "setting wheel") and interlocking aperture/shutter rings as the Reflex S.

The Retina Reflex III originally sold in 1961 for US$248.50 (equivalent to $2,680 in 2025). Approximately 116,000 were made.

=== Retina Reflex IV ===
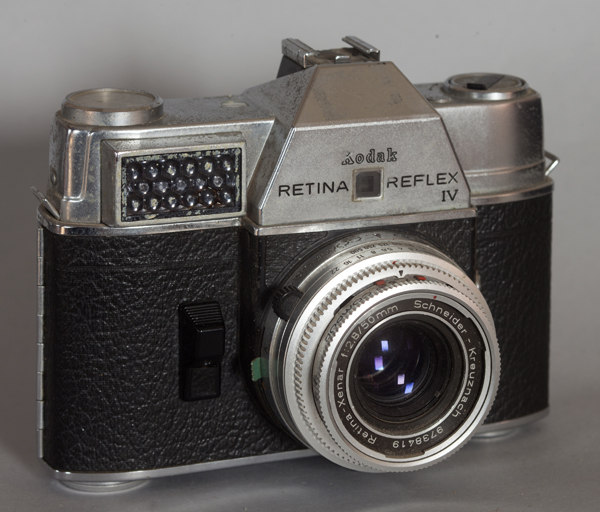
Retina Reflex IV with Schneider-Kreuznach Retina-Xenar 50 mm f/2.8 lens

The Type 051 Retina Reflex IV was made from 1964 to 1967. It has a characteristic little window in the front of its pentaprism housing, which displays the aperture in use in the viewfinder. The accessory shoe now had flash contacts. The frame counter now automatically resets to 36 when the back is opened; the frame advance slider is used to set the counter for shorter rolls. The split-image rangefinder on the ground glass is now at a 45 degree angle.

The Retina Reflex IV originally sold in 1964 for US$277 (equivalent to $2,880 in 2025). Over 524,000 were made.

=== Instamatic Reflex ===
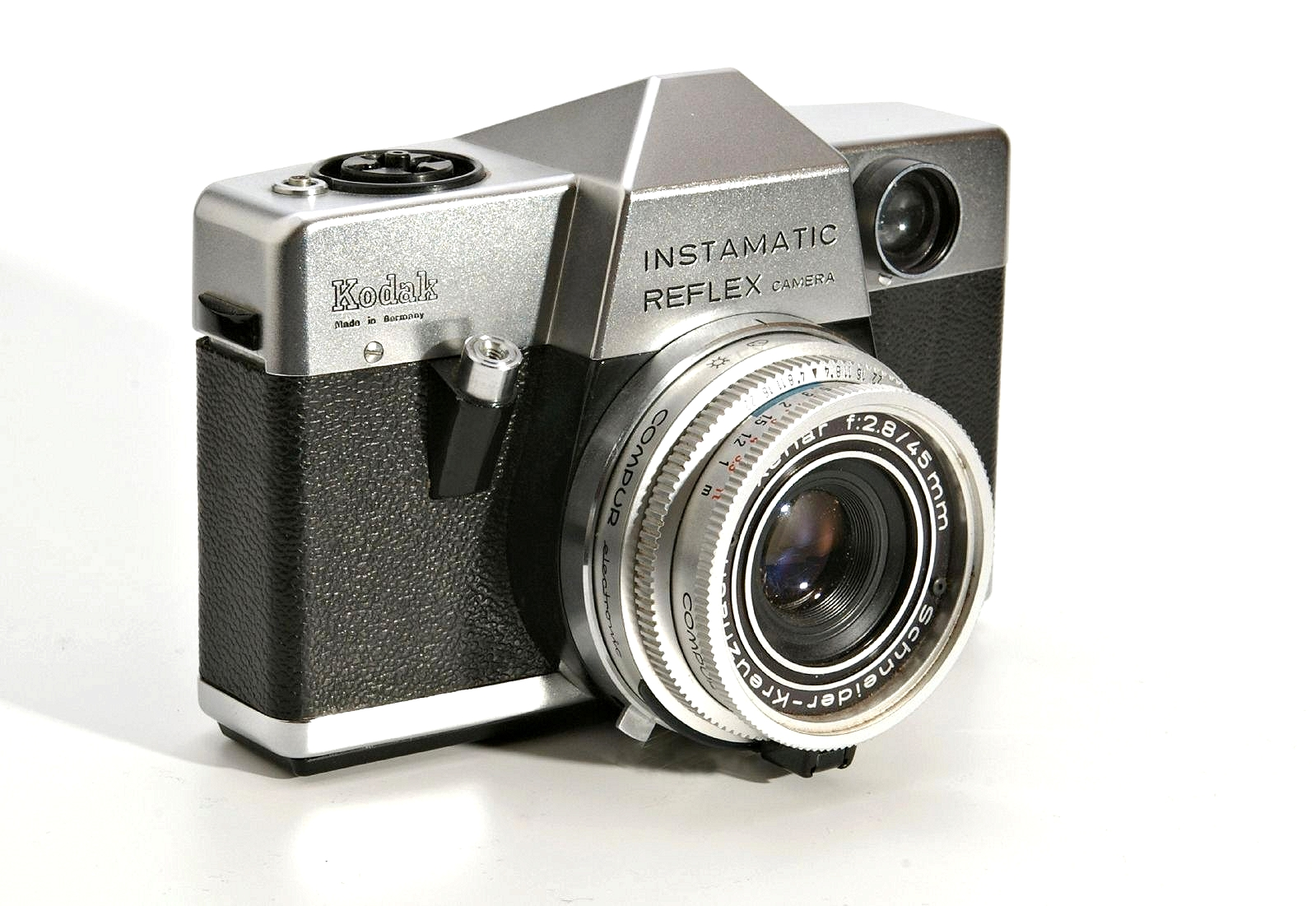
Instamatic Reflex with Schneider-Kreuznach Xenar 45 mm f/2.8 lens

The shutter speeds on the Instamatic Reflex, billed as the camera which "does simply everything, and everything simply", range from 1/500 to 20 seconds, with flashcube sync at 1/30 and 1/300 with an electronic flash. Two PX825 button cell batteries are used to power the CdS exposure meter, flashcubes, and shutter speed control; without batteries, the 1/500 second shutter speed was still available. For the Xenar 45 mm lens included with most kits, the aperture could be linked to the focus to provide the correct exposure when using flashcubes.

The Instamatic Reflex was sold from 1968 until 1974; when it was introduced, the list price ranged from US$157 (equivalent to $1,450 in 2025) for the body only, finished in black, to US$249 (equivalent to $2,310 in 2025) with the f/1.9 lens.

=== Lenses for Retina Reflex S, III, IV, Instamatic Reflex, and Retina IIIS ===
The 135 mm lenses could be fitted with the earlier "T I/60" close-up lens to bring the focusing distance range to 1.43 to 2.0 m (4.7 to 6.6 ft), or a "T II/60" close-up lens, which brought the focusing distance range to 2.0 to 3.72 m (6.6 to 12.2 ft). The 85 mm lenses could be fitted with a "T I/32" close-up lens, which brings the focusing distance range to 1.0 to 1.8 m (3.3 to 5.9 ft).

DKL-mount lenses for Retina Reflex S, III, IV, Instamatic Reflex and Retina IIIS
FL (mm)	Aperture	Manufacturer	Name	Construction	Min. Focus	Accessory size	Notes
Wide angle lenses
28	f/4	Schneider-Kreuznach	Retina Curtagon	7e	3.0 ft (0.91 m)	60 mm	
30	f/2.8	Rodenstock	Retina Eurygon	?	?		
35	f/2.8	Schneider-Kreuznach	Retina Curtagon	5e	3.0 ft (0.91 m)	32 mm	
35	f/4	Rodenstock	Retina Eurygon	?	?		
Normal lenses
45	f/2.8	Schneider-Kreuznach	Xenar	4e	3.3 ft (1.0 m)		
50	f/2.8	Schneider-Kreuznach	Retina Xenar	?	?	32 mm	
50	f/2.8	Rodenstock	Retina Ysarex	?	?	32 mm	
50	f/1.9	Schneider-Kreuznach	Xenon	6e	2.0 ft (0.61 m)	60 mm	
50	f/1.9	Rodenstock	Retina Heligon	?	?	60 mm	
Portrait lenses
85	f/4	Schneider-Kreuznach	Retina Tele-Arton	5e	6.0 ft (1.8 m)	32 mm	
85	f/4	Rodenstock	Retina Rotelar	?	?	32 mm	
135	f/4	Schneider-Kreuznach	Retina Tele-Xenar	5e	14 ft (4.3 m)	60 mm	(Note: Accepts "T 1/60" close-up lens to shorten minimum focusing distance.)
135	f/4	Rodenstock	Retina Rotelar	?	?	60 mm	
Telephoto lenses
200	f/4.8	Schneider-Kreuznach	Retina Tele-Xenar	7e	28 ft (8.5 m)		

Notes

List of Schneider-Kreuznach Retina DKL-mount lenses:

- Schneider-Kreuznach Retina-Curtagon 28mm f/4
- Schneider-Kreuznach Curtagon 28mm f/4 (for Instamatic Reflex)
- Schneider-Kreuznach Retina-Curtagon 35mm f/2.8
- Schneider-Kreuznach Curtagon 35mm f/2.8 (for Instamatic Reflex)
- Schneider-Kreuznach Retina-Xenar 45mm f/2.8 (for Instamatic Reflex, can be used with Retina Reflex S, III, IV, but not with the Retina IIIS)
- Schneider-Kreuznach Retina-Xenar 50mm f/2.8
- Schneider-Kreuznach Retina-Xenon 50mm f/1.9
- Schneider-Kreuznach Xenon 50mm f/1.9 (for Instamatic Reflex)
- Schneider-Kreuznach Retina-Tele-Arton 85mm f/4
- Schneider-Kreuznach Retina-Tele-Arton 90mm f/4 (for Instamatic Reflex)
- Schneider-Kreuznach Retina-Tele-Xenar 135mm f/4
- Schneider-Kreuznach Retina-Tele-Xenar 200mm f/4.8 (does not have the rangefinder cam necessary for focussing through viewfinder with the Retina IIIS)

List of Rodenstock Retina DKL-mount lenses:

- Rodenstock Retina-Eurygon 30mm f/2.8
- Rodenstock Retina-Eurygon 35mm f/4
- Rodenstock Retina-Ysarex 50mm f/2.8
- Rodenstock Retina-Heligon (and Retina-Ysarex???) 50mm f/1.9
- Rodenstock Retina-Rotelar 85mm f/4
- Rodenstock Retina-Rotelar 135mm f/4

List of third-party Retina DKL-mount lenses:

- Univer-sar Tele Photo 135mm f/4
- Bittco Super Vemar 135mm f/4
- Vemar Telephoto 200mm f/4.8
- Vemar Telephoto 135mm f/2.8
