= August Nagel =

German camera designer

August Nagel (June 1882 – October 1943) was a German camera manufacturer and designer. He was among the founders of Zeiss-Ikon and later left to form Nagel Werke, which he subsequently sold to Eastman Kodak. His most notable legacy is the Kodak 135 film cartridge which remains the world standard for 35mm still cameras.

== Biography ==
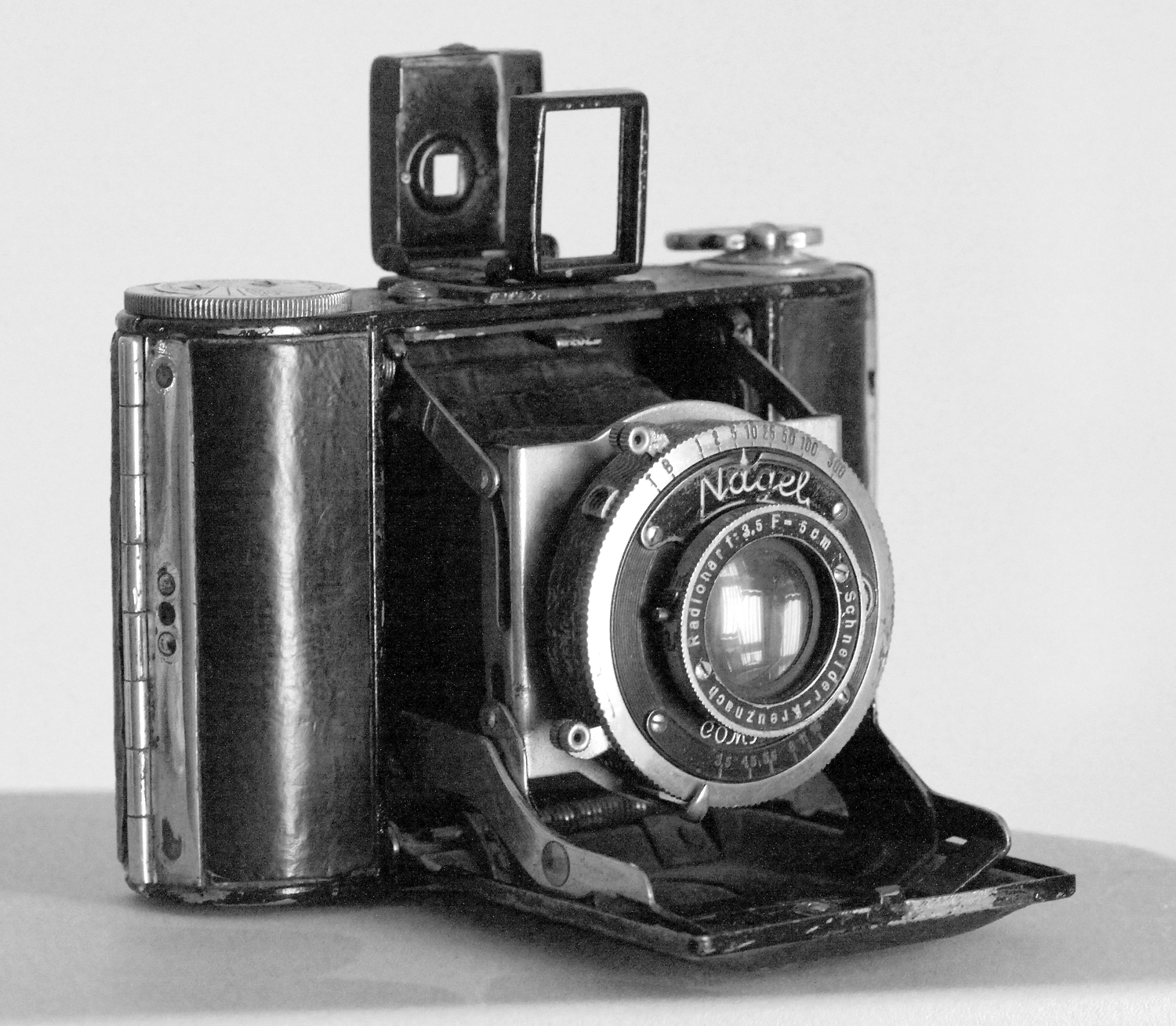
Nagel Vollenda half frame 127 camera of about 1930

In 1908, at 26, he and his friend Carl Drexler founded Drexler & Nagel in Stuttgart, to produce photographic equipment. In 1908 they produced the Contessa No. 1 in the 4 1/2 cm × 7 cm format. In 1909, the company was renamed Contessa Camera Works Stuttgart. The ever-growing plant developed 23 different models by 1910, to be exported around the world. As a passionate sportsman and balloon enthusiast, Nagel pioneered the development of cameras for cartographic, geographical and military areas. He developed a special balloon camera. In recognition of the work on the balloon and aviator cameras, in 1918, the University of Freiburg awarded the 36 year old inventor the honorary title of Doctor.

During the First World War, the factory with 500 employees, produced military equipment. After the war the company grew through innovation and acquisition and became known as Contessa-Nettel. In 1926 Nagel merged Contessa-Nettel with three other firms: Ernemann, Goerz and Ica, and with financial backing from Zeiss, formed Zeiss Ikon. August Nagel was director of manufacturing. However, only two years later he left to form Dr.-August Nagel-Factory, and produced the Librette, Recomar, Vollenda, and Pupille cameras among others.

In 1932 he sold his company to Eastman Kodak, forming the Kodak AG division. With additional funding Nagel began to develop a high quality yet affordable 35mm camera to compete with Leica and Contax. With the release of the Retina 35mm camera, he also introduced a new pre-packaged 35mm cartridge known as Kodak 135 film. This was the first pre-rolled 35mm film cartridge and it would fit into both the Leica and the Contax cameras. This became the 35mm film standard that is still used today.

The Retinas and the economy Retinette cameras became the main 35mm Kodak offering in Europe and America. As WWII approached these were the most important Kodak AG products. August Nagel died in 1943 at the age of 61 years, but production continued through and after the war. Retina cameras continued to evolve and diversify through the late 1950s when Japanese competition crushed the German camera industry. Though in decline, Kodak AG offered single lens reflex cameras with interchangeable lenses into the 1960s. Later products declined in quality and features, with the last of the Retinas being simple viewfinder cameras with modest fixed lenses. Though not branded as a Retina, the Kodak Instamatic Reflex of 1968–1972 was essentially a Retina Reflex with interchangeable lenses, but using the Instamatic film cassettes.

== Bibliography ==
- Kalton C. Lahue, Joseph A. Bailey, Glass, Brass, and Chrome: The American 35mm Miniature Camera, University of Oklahoma Press (April 15, 2002) ISBN 0806134348
- Brian Coe, Kodak Cameras: The First Hundred Years, Steyning Photo Books LLP; 2nd edition (August 11, 2003) ISBN 1874707375
- Douglas Collins, The Story of Kodak, Harry N Abrams; First edition (October 1990), ISBN 0810912228
- Mina Fisher Hammer, History of the Kodak, and its continuations ..., The House of Little Books (1940), ASIN: B0013AOG9M
- Kalton C. Lahue, Collector's Guide: Kodak Retina Cameras, Petersen Publishing Co. (1973) ASIN: B001UUP1LC
- Mike Levy and Michael Levy, Selecting and Using Classic Cameras: A User's Guide to Evaluating Features, Condition & Usability of Classic Cameras, Amherst Media (July 1, 2001), ISBN 1584280549
- Kemmler, Karl Otto: Contessa. Die Geschichte der Contessa-Camera-Werke unter ihrem Gründer August Nagel, 1908-26, 1984
- Steinroth, Karl: August Nagel, Pionier der Kleinbildkamera, in Bild der Wissenschaft, Deutsche Verlags-Anstalt GmbH, Stuttgart, Ausgabe Juni 1982, S. 145 ff
- Karl Otto Kemmler (1997). "Nagel, August". Neue Deutsche Biographie (in German). Vol. 18. Berlin: Duncker & Humblot. pp. 708–709. (full text online).
