= Dean M. Peterson =

Dean McCormack Peterson (1931–2004) was an American inventor, responsible for two of consumer photography's largest revolutions: the Kodak Instamatic camera, introduced in 1963, and the panoply of "point-and-shoot" cameras introduced in the late 1970s. Both of these inventions had a huge impact on consumer photography, and nearly every snapshot taken since the mid-1960s, and virtually every photo of any kind since the 1980s, have benefited from Peterson's pioneering work.

== Background/Education ==
Peterson was born and raised in South Dakota. He graduated from Aberdeen Central High School in 1950 and attended Northern State for two years before transferring to the South Dakota School of Mines and Technology. He went to work for Eastman Kodak after earning a BS from Mines in 1954, marrying his high school sweetheart and serving two years in the Army at the end of the Korean War. He later received a master's degree in Mechanical Engineering from the University of Rochester (in 1963).

== The Instamatic Revolution ==
Peterson's invention and development of the Instamatic camera at Eastman Kodak in the 1960s heralded an unprecedented explosion in amateur snapshot photography. With over 70 million units sold by 1970, there were very few American households without an Instamatic. Based on the simple idea that loading and unloading the film in a camera ought to be a one-step process, the development of the drop-in film cartridge and a line of easy-to-use cameras for it created a phenomenon. Not since George Eastman's introduction of roll film had there been such a sales spike in the photo industry.

== The "Point and Shoot" Revolution ==
In the 1970s Peterson was principally responsible for the innovations that made possible the "point and shoot" camera revolution that extends into the 21st century. Autofocus, off-the-film metering, auto-film-advance and built-in self-quenching electronic flash: all were featured on the "Project Beehive" camera developed by Peterson and his team of engineers and introduced by Honeywell at photokina in 1972. The technologies from the "beehive" camera continue to resonate throughout the photography, digital photography, cinematography and video industries. Honeywell never introduced the camera to the market, but successfully sued other camera manufacturers who did so for infringement of Peterson's autofocus and light metering patents.

== Awards and recognition ==
For his accomplishments in the field, Peterson was one of four people named Fellows of the Society for Imaging Science and Technology in 1975 (another inductee that year was Ansel Adams). He also received accolades from the American Society of Mechanical Engineers, the Society of Photo-Optical Instrumentation Engineers, the Society of Plastics Engineers and the Triangle Fraternity of Engineers and Architects. He received the Distinguished Alumni Award from the South Dakota School of Mines and Technology in 2000 and was posthumously named to Aberdeen Central's Hall of Fame in 2007, together with former Senate Majority Leader Tom Daschle and Apollo spacecraft guidance system designer John Miller. In 2012, he was elected to the "Triangle Wall of Fame" by the Triangle Fraternity of Architects and Engineers, together with Michael Morhaime, founder of Blizzard Entertainment and developer of World of Warcraft.

== Beyond Photography ==
Peterson's influence went beyond the photography industry. He was responsible for the development of two of the most successful products in the history of Fisher-Price Toys, their childproof audiocassette recorder and phonograph player, both introduced in the early 1980s. He designed a number of important advanced products for the medical industry, and developed a variety of patented methods for improving manufacturing processes, saving manufacturers tens of millions of dollars over the course of his career. He co-developed the Nimslo camera, the first 3D consumer camera, the first high-speed video camera for scientific motion analysis for Spin Physics division of Eastman Kodak, and provided the mechanical design for the world's first tablet computer. Overall, nearly 50 patents bear his name.

Throughout his life, Dean's recreational passions were fly-fishing and golf. According to Peterson, his favorite invention was the Morgan Reel, a single-action fly reel named after his father-in-law, Morgan Drake, featuring a unique, infinitely-variable drag mechanism which can never be damaged by sand or grit, superior ergonomics, and the ability to operate either with the characteristic "click" familiar in most fly reels or completely silently.
