= Instamatic =

Film camera brand from Kodak

For the film formats associated with the Instamatic and Pocket Instamatic camera ranges, see 126 film and 110 film respectively.

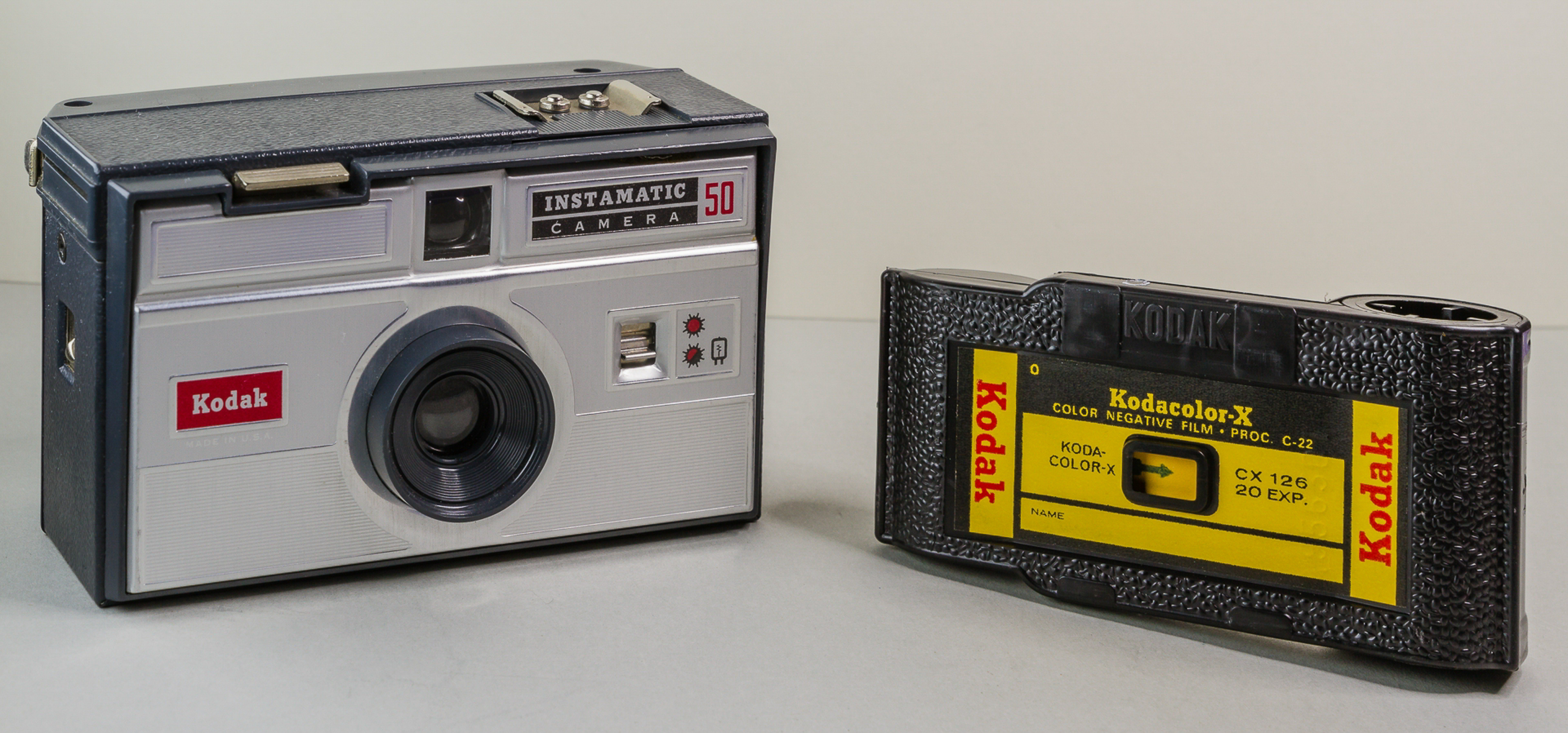
Instamatic 50, an early model, alongside Kodacolor-X 126 film cartridge

Instamatic is a series of inexpensive and easy-to-use point-and-shoot cameras made by Kodak beginning in 1963. The cameras used 110 and 126 film cartridges, making the loading and unloading of film easier for the consumer. The Instamatic was immensely successful, introducing a generation to low-cost photography and spawning numerous imitators. During its heyday, the range was so ubiquitous that the Instamatic name is still frequently used as a generic term to refer to any inexpensive point-and-shoot camera. The X-15F was the last Instamatic camera sold in the United States, remaining on sale until 1988.

Kodak also used the Instamatic name on some Super 8-based home-cine cameras.

== History ==
Market research which showed that most consumers would be happier with more automated film loading and exposure settings led Kodak to develop the Instamatic cameras starting in the early 1950s under project Easy Load, later updated to Project 13. A. D. Johnson, manager of advertising, is credited with coining the name Instamatic. In a 1993 article speculating about the potential details of what would eventually be released as the Advanced Photo System, Herbert Keppler noted that "many snapshooters didn't buy cameras or take pictures because they simply couldn't load rollfilm or 35mm cameras. [...] Kodak's Kodapak 126 35mm cartridge, introduced in 1963, solved the problems of film loading, film advance, and rewinding. [...] It was a sensational success among snapshooters."

=== Early Instamatics ===
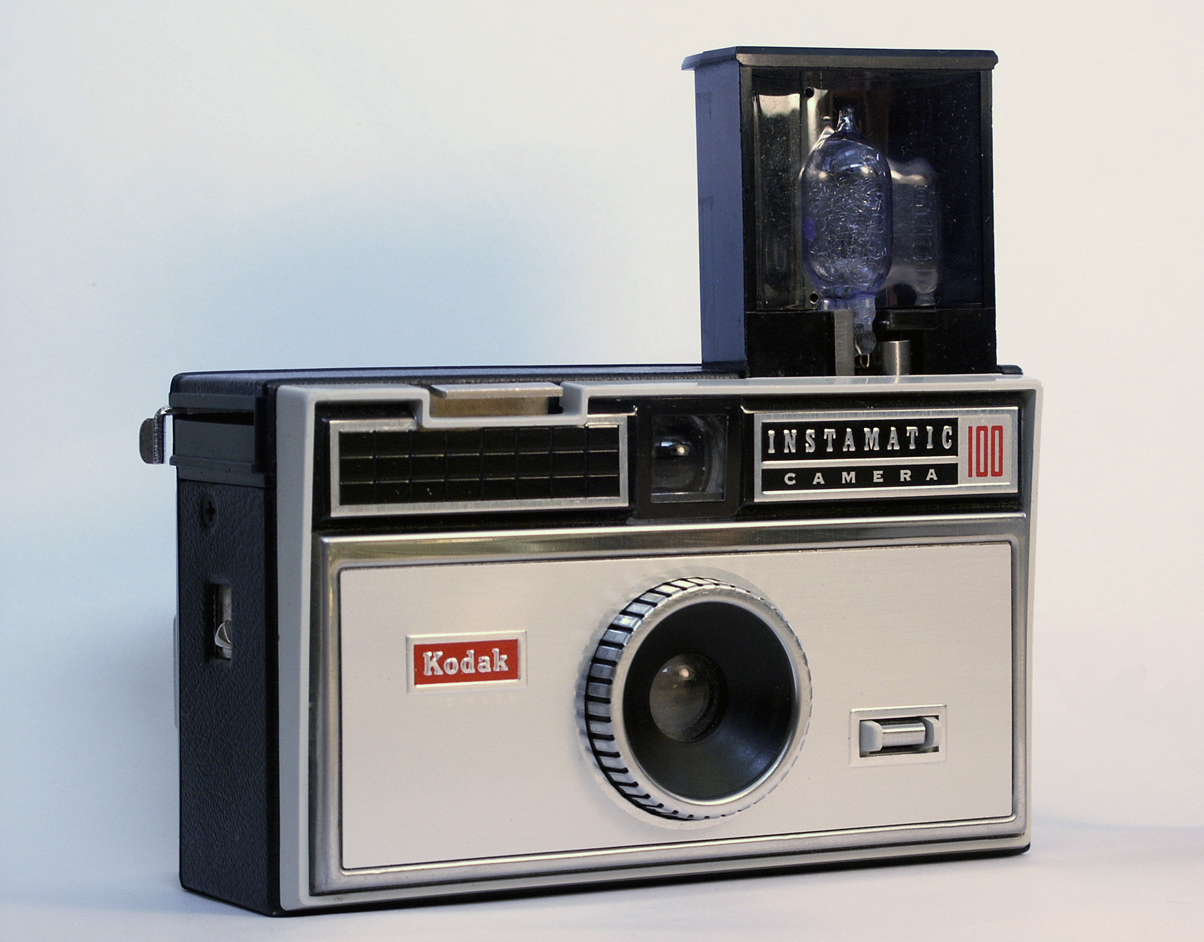
The Instamatic 100, the first Instamatic sold in the US, with single flashbulb attached

The lead designer for the Instamatic program was Dean M. Peterson (original design by Alexander Gow), also later known for most of the innovations in the point-and-shoot camera revolution of the 1980s. They were the first cameras to use Kodak's new 126 format. The easy-load film cartridge made the cameras very inexpensive to produce, as it provided the film backing plate and exposure counter itself and thus saved considerable design complexity and manufacturing cost for the cameras. Kodak sold various print and slide films in the 126 format.

The first Instamatic to be released was the Instamatic 50, which appeared in the UK in February 1963. The first model released in the US was the basic Instamatic 100, approximately one month later, which included a built-in flashgun for single-use AG-1 "peanut" bulbs, a feature lacking in the 50. With non-adjustable aperture, focus, and shutter speed (1/90 sec.), it continued in the tradition of Kodak's earlier Brownie cameras, providing a simple snapshot camera anyone could use, with the added convenience of drop-in loading using "Kodapak" cartridges. These were offered initially with one of four preloaded films: Verichrome Pan, Kodachrome-X, Kodacolor-X, and Ektacolor-X.

The first Instamatics went on sale for $16 in early 1963 and were soon followed by the 300 (which had a light meter), the 400 (which had a light meter and a spring driven film advance), and the 700 (which had a light meter and adjustable focus and shutter speeds). Early fixed-focus Instamatics used either a 43 mm f/11 plastic lens or a 41 mm f/8 Kodar glass lens; the 700 was equipped with a marginally wider and much faster 38 mm Ektar/Ektanar f/2.8 lens. The final digit in the model designation (e.g., 100 or 104) refers to the type of flash used: models ending in 0 had a built-in flashgun, while those ending in 4 (introduced in 1965) used flashcubes.

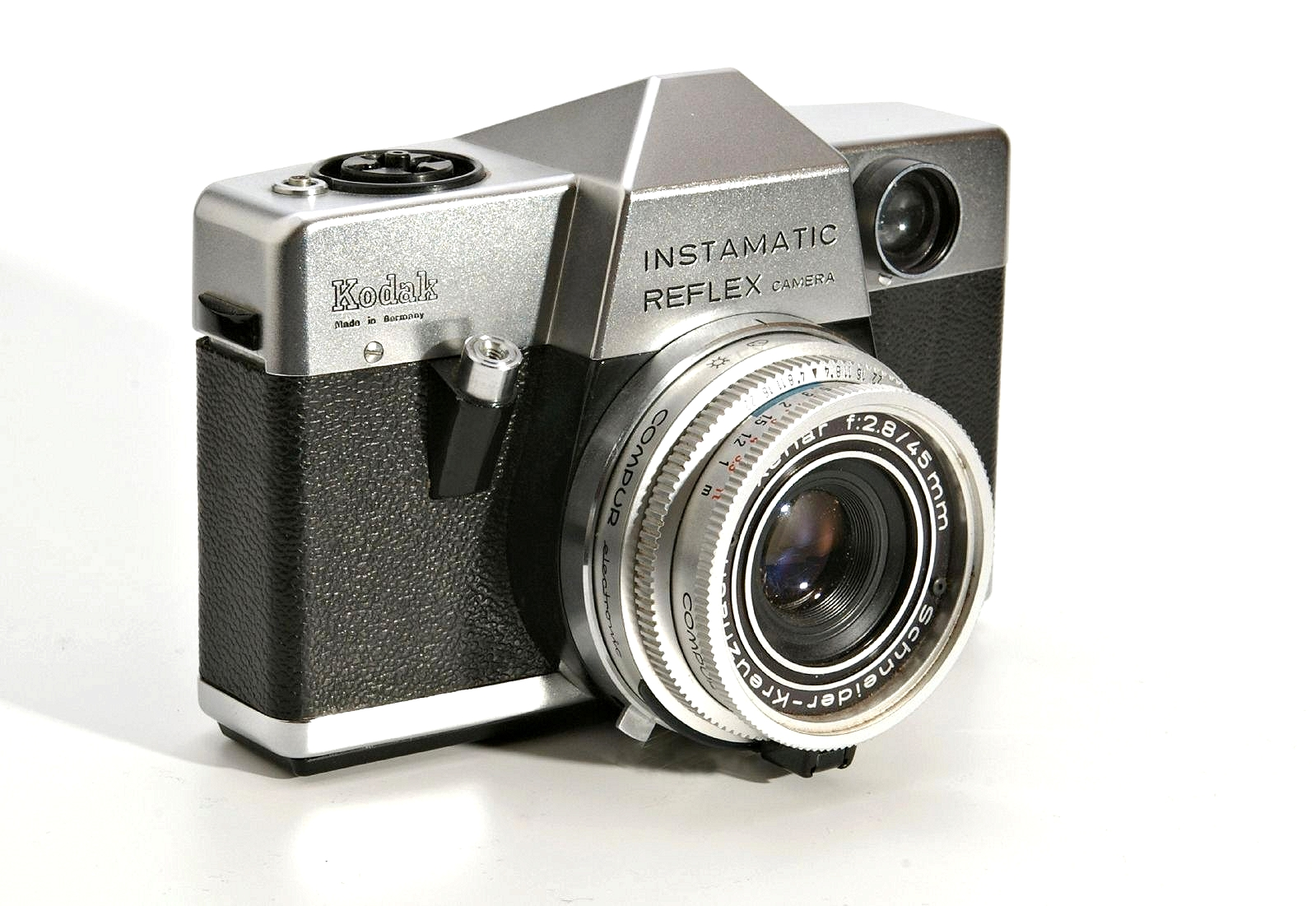
Kodak Instamatic Reflex SLR model

The lineup was soon expanded to include a variety of models from the basic but popular 100/104 to the automatic exposure 800/804, which featured an aluminum chassis, rangefinder, selenium light meter, and clockwork spring wind. The best model made in the USA was the 814, which had a four-element lens and a coupled range-finder. The top-of-the-line model was the Instamatic Reflex (1969), a single-lens reflex camera which was made in Germany and could accept a variety of Retina S-mount lenses. Some German-built Instamatic cameras such as the 250 and 500 included fixed lenses made by Rodenstock and Schneider Kreuznach.

=== Commercial success ===
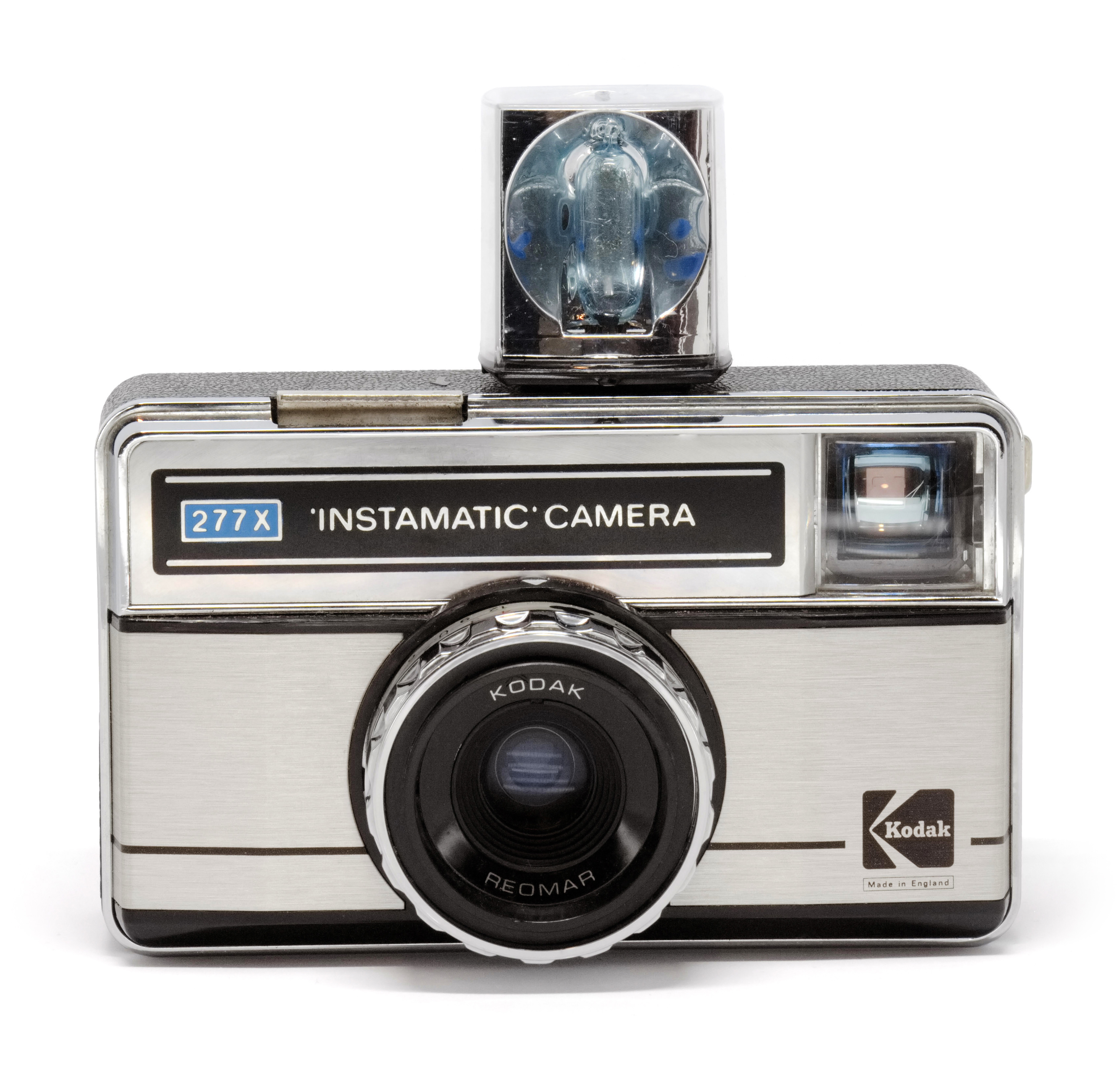
Instamatic 277-X, a later model with a "Magicube" flashbulb cartridge attached

The Instamatic was an instant success; more than 50 million Instamatic cameras were produced between 1963 and 1970. Kodak even gave away a considerable number in a joint promotion with Scott paper towels in the early 1970s to generate many new photographers and stimulate lasting demand for its film business.

Many other manufacturers attempted to capitalize on the popularity of the Instamatic with their own 126 cameras, including Canon, Olympus, Minolta, Ricoh, Zeiss Ikon, and even Rollei. Some of these models were far more sophisticated and expensive than the majority of the Kodak cameras: the Rollei SL26, for instance, featured interchangeable lenses (28mm, 40mm, and 80mm), TTL metering, and a rangefinder, and retailed for $300.

A new series of Instamatics was introduced in 1970 to take advantage of the new Magicube flash technology. Magicubes used mechanically triggered pyrotechnic detonators for each bulb, eliminating the need to carry batteries. Instamatics with Magicube sockets were denoted by an "X" in the model number (e.g. X-15 or 55X).

=== Pocket Instamatic (110 format) ===
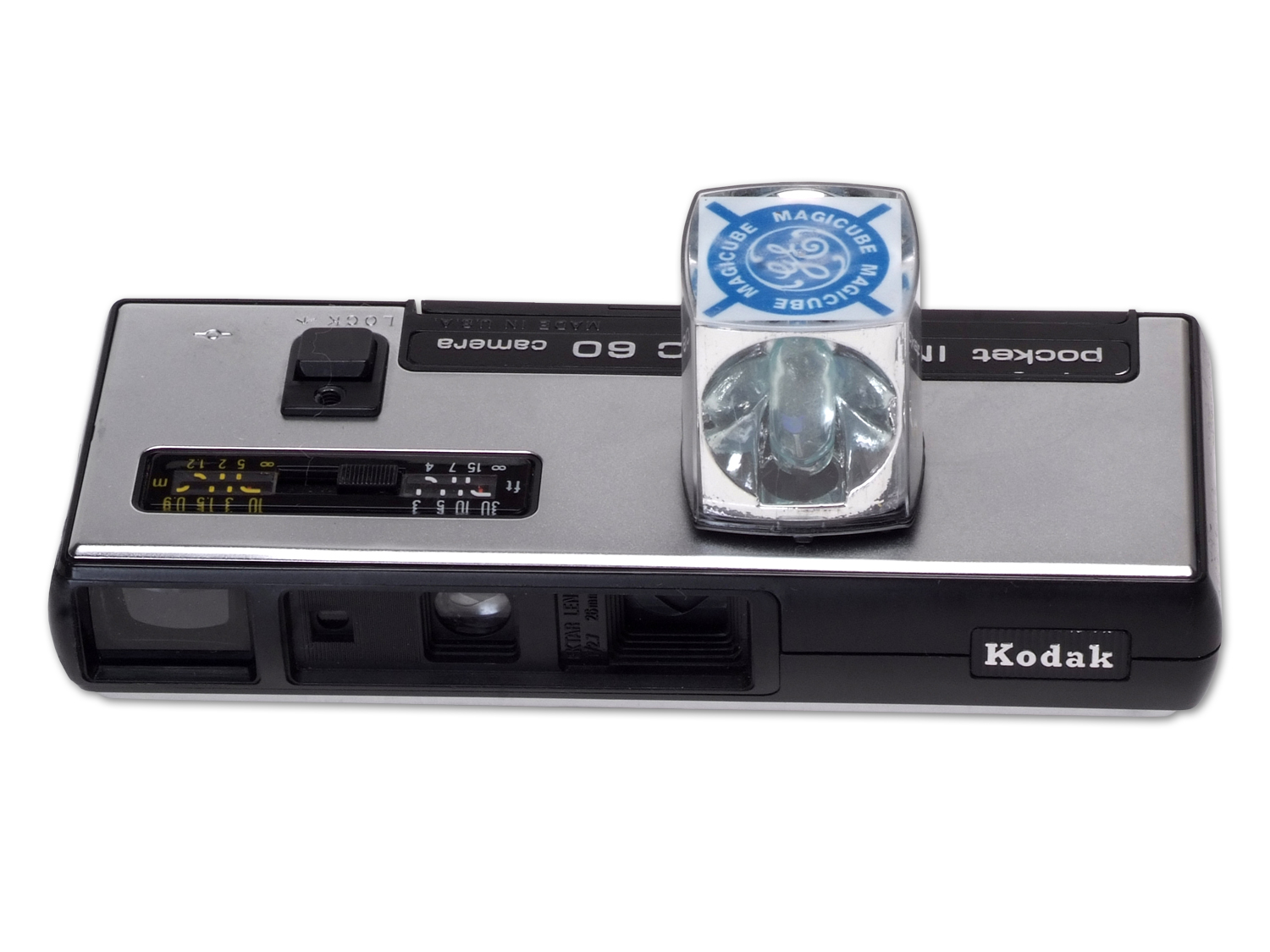
Kodak Pocket Instamatic 60 using 110 film.

In 1972, Kodak introduced the Pocket Instamatic series for its new 110 format. The 110 cartridge had the same easy-load cartridge design with an integral take-up spool as the 126 format, but was much smaller, allowing the cameras to be very compact (hence the "Pocket" designation). Many cameras carry a four-character date code inside the film compartment or on the door.

At launch in the United States, there were five models: in ascending order of sophistication, the Pocket Instamatic 20, 30, 40, 50, and 60. The top-of-the-line model was the Pocket Instamatic 60, which featured a stainless steel body, rangefinder, and automatic exposure with a four-element 26 mm f/2.7–17 Ektar lens. Programmed autoexposure selected an appropriate combination of aperture, with shutter speeds ranging from 1/250 to 10 seconds. The 50 shared the same lens and autoexposure system, but dropped the rangefinder for scale focusing. The 40 had a much slower 25 mm f/8 three-element lens and two-position focusing, and the 30 had an even slower 25 mm f/9.5 fixed-focus lens; both carried a similar programmed autoexposure system. The 20 shared the same 25 mm f/9.5 fixed-focus lens as the 30 and offered a single shutter speed of 1/100 second, which automatically changed to 1/40 when a flashcube was inserted. An entry-level Pocket Instamatic 10 was launched by 1973, with a fixed-focus 25 mm f/11 lens and operation similar to the 20.

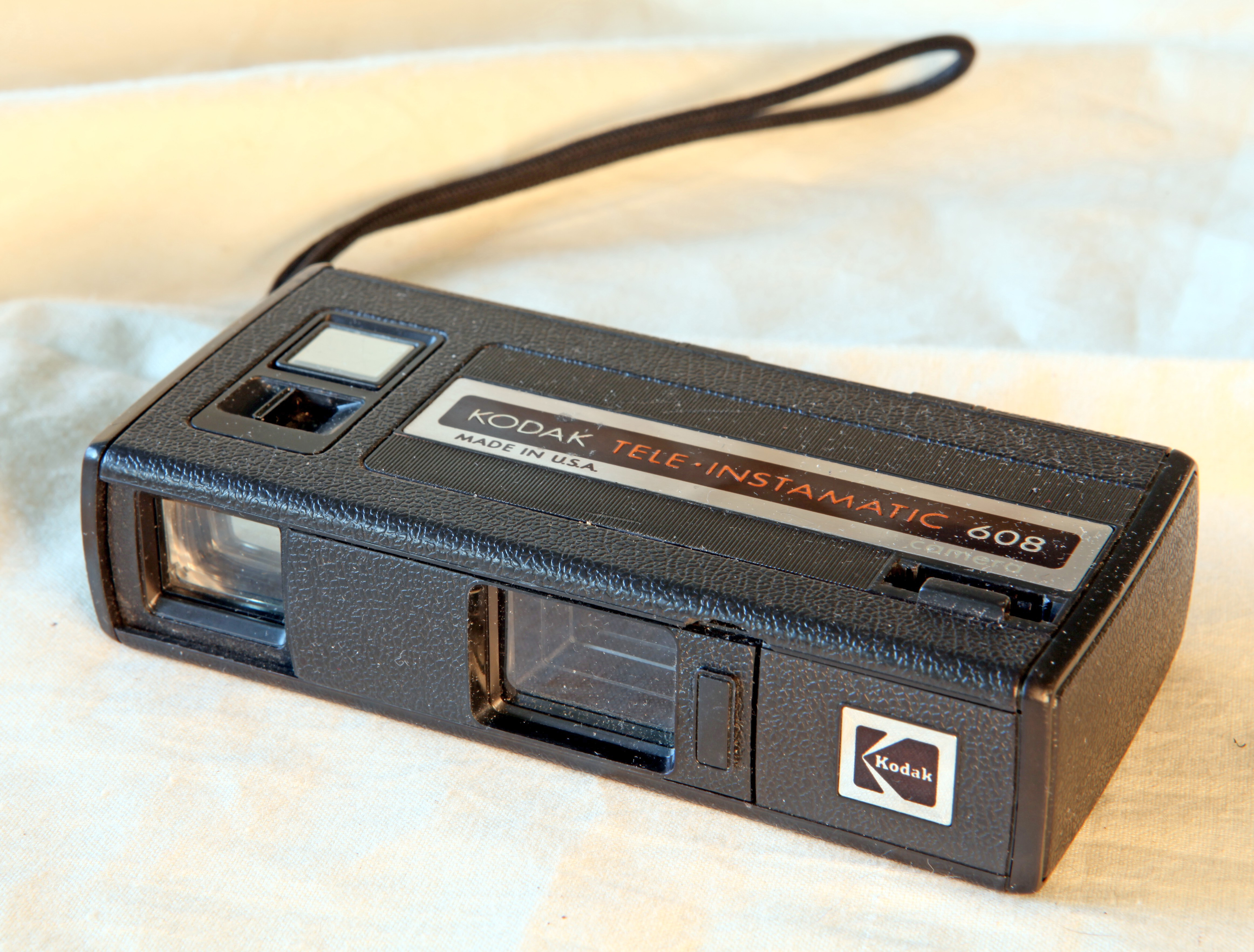
Kodak Tele-Instamatic 608

By 1977, the initial lineup had been replaced by the Trimlite Instamatic and Tele-Instamatic lines for the United States. The Trimlite Instamatic 48 was a rebadged Pocket Instamatic 60, carrying the same features as the previous top-line model, and other Trimlites included the 38 (similar to the Pocket 40), 28 (Pocket 30), and 18 (Pocket 10). The Tele-Instamatics featured a sliding teleconverter switch. That line included the 708, which offered a new "multi-element" (three-element 25 mm f/5.6 or four-element 43 mm) lens with scale focusing and programmed autoexposure, similar to the prior Pocket 50, and the 608, which switched the single-element lens from 25 mm to 43 mm, both f/11, with a fixed shutter speed similar to the prior Pocket 20; engaging the teleconverter also would switch the viewfinder.

Kodak introduced a mass-produced aspheric lens for still photography in October 1978 with the Ektramax 110 camera. The lens is a four-element, 25 mm f/1.9 design with scale focusing. Three of the elements, including the aspheric one, are molded plastic.

Over 25 million Pocket Instamatics were produced in under three years, and the 110 format remained popular into the 1990s. However, the small negative size (13×17 mm) limited quality when using the film emulsion of the period; in practice, most prints were small, so the poor quality was not apparent unless the prints were enlarged beyond postcard size.

=== Mid-1970s to late 1980s ===
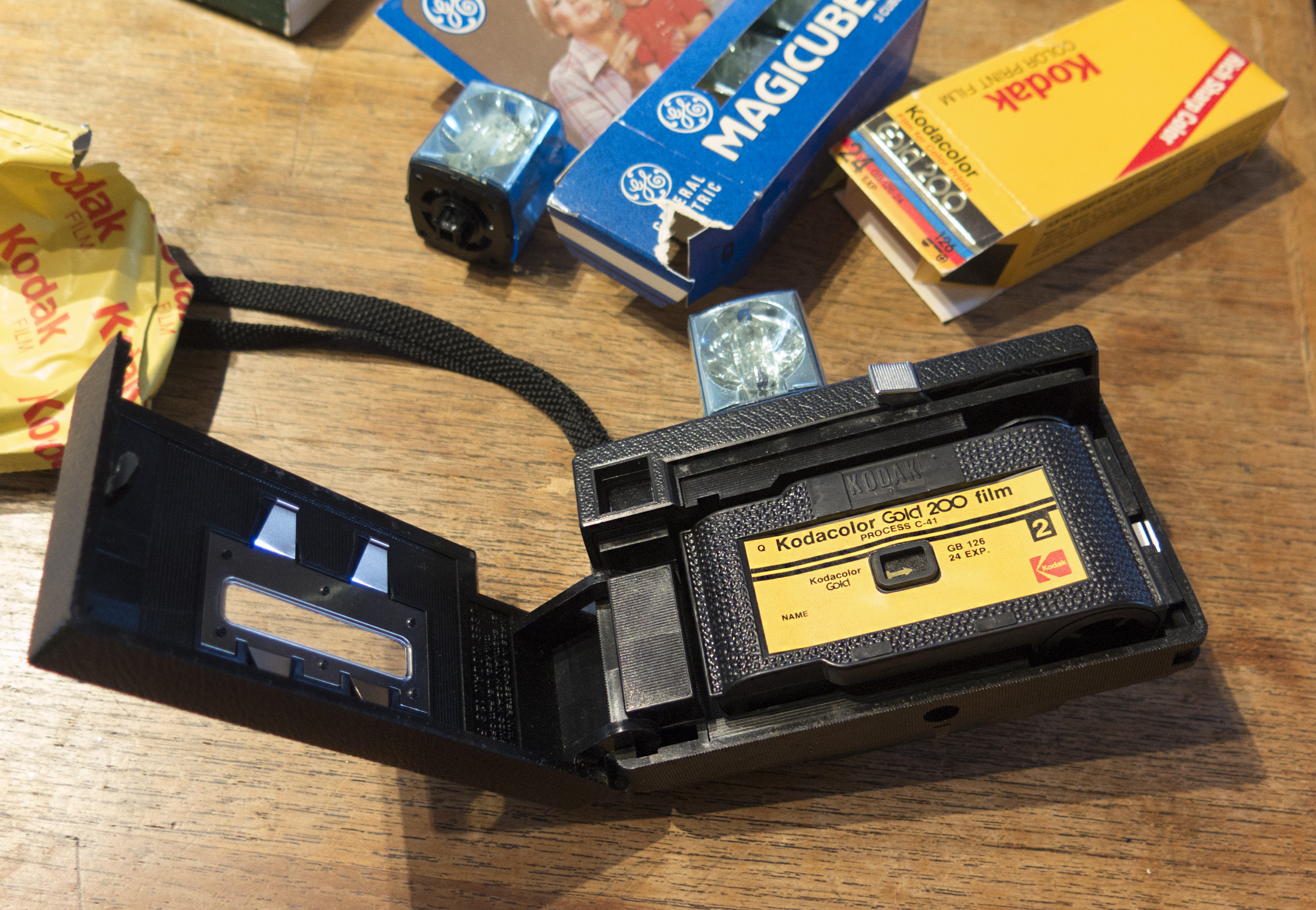
Loading film cartridge in a Kodak X-15

In 1976, the Instamatic X line was updated for use with the new Flipflash system. These cameras were designated by the addition of the suffix "F" to the model number of the corresponding Magicube model. The basic X-15F was the last Instamatic sold in the United States, remaining on sale until 1988.

=== Contemporary influence ===
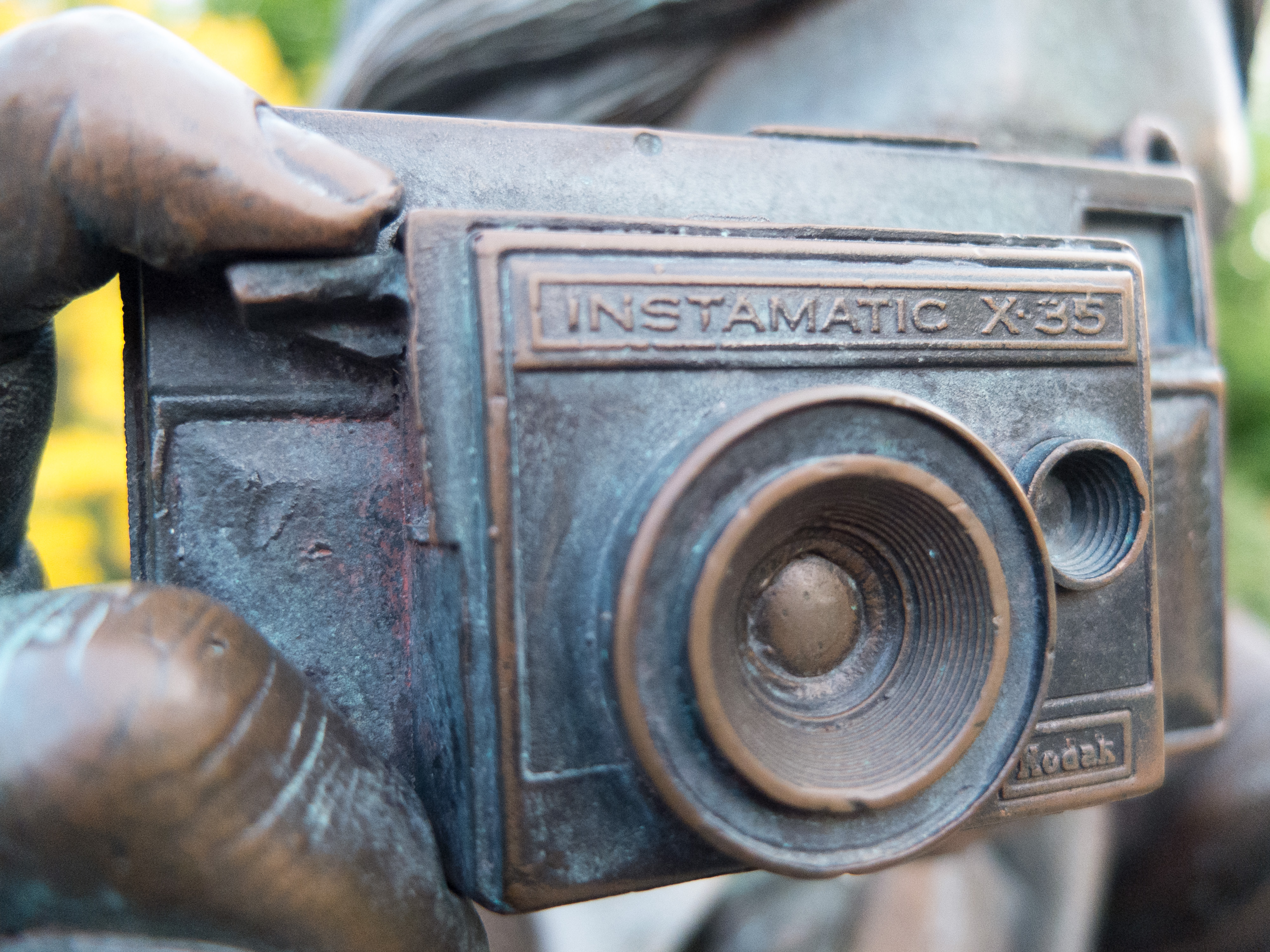
Detail of Photo Session (Johnson, 1984)

In 1984, Photo Session, a group of four bronze statues created by J. Seward Johnson, Jr., was installed in Queen Elizabeth Park of Vancouver, British Columbia. The statues depict three people posing in front of a mountainous backdrop, with a fourth photographing the group using an Instamatic X-35. One of the three statues posing for the photograph was stolen in June 2008; it was recovered without damage two months later.

Hipstamatic, an automated photograph post-processing application for mobile devices released in 2009, used an interface inspired by the Instamatic to produce similar toy camera-like images and was meant to evoke "a simpler-is-better past, an age where cheap, mass-produced plastic cameras were built to last". It was named as one of the top iPhone application "award winners" by Apple in 2010. A few years later, the Instagram social media network included filters "designed to make digital photographs look like snapshots taken with the toy cameras of yesteryear: the Kodak Brownie, the Instamatic, the Polaroid". The simple, geometric physical Instamatic camera design and square image format captured on 126 film directly inspired the updated Instagram logo and aesthetic. Like Hipstamatic, Instagram was named the "iPhone App Of The Year" by Apple in 2011. The two services were combined by Slate in 2012 as the inadvertently circular portmanteau Instamatic.

== Instamatic cameras ==
126 film Kodak Instamatic cameras
Model	Intro	Lens			Min. focus	Shutter (sec)	Market(s)	Notes
Model	Intro	FL / Name	Ap.	Constr.	Min. focus	Shutter (sec)	Market(s)	Notes
50	1963	43 mm	f/11 (Note: Fixed setting, not adjustable)	1e	15 ft (4.6 m)	1/90, 1/40 (Note: Shutter speed when flash is used)	UK	
100/104 (Note: xx0 models use AG-1 flashbulbs, while the corresponding xx4 models, introduced in 1965, use Magicubes)	1963 (1965)	43 mm	f/11	1e	15 ft (4.6 m)	1/90, 1/40	US	Basically identical to 50, with different flash interface
300/304	1963 (1965)	41 mm Kodar	f/8–32 (Note: Automatically set by camera)	3e	15 ft (4.6 m)	1/60, 1/40	US	
400/404	1963 (1965)	41 mm Kodar	f/8–32	3e	15 ft (4.6 m)	1/60, 1/40	US	Identical to 300/304 with addition of spring-driven film advance
500	1963	38 mm Xenar	f/2.8–22	4e	2.5 ft (0.76 m)–∞	1/30 – 1/500	US, EU	Lens made by Schneider; built-in match-needle meter; equipped with hotshoe
700/704	1963 (1965)	38 mm Ektanar	f/2.8–64	3e	3 ft (0.91 m)–∞	1/60 – 1/250 (+ 1/30) (Note: Slowest shutter speed automatically set by camera, if needed)	US	Aperture linked to focusing distance when using flash
150/154	1964 (1965)	43 mm	f/11	1e	15 ft (4.6 m)	1/90, 1/40	US	Basically identical to 100/104 with spring-driven film advance
250	1964	38 mm Reomar	f/2.8–22	3e	2.5 ft (0.76 m)–∞	1/30 – 1/250	US, EU	Lens made by Rodenstock; accepts AG-1B and AG-3B flashbulbs
800/804	1964 (1965)	38 mm Ektanar	f/2.8–64	3e	3 ft (0.91 m)–∞	1/60 – 1/250 (+ 1/30)	US	Identical to 700/704 with addition of spring-driven film advance
Hawkeye	1964	43 mm	f/11	1e	15 ft (4.6 m)	1/90, 1/40	US	Basically identical to 50
Hawkeye F	1964	43 mm	f/11	1e	15 ft (4.6 m)	1/90, 1/40	US	Basically identical to 100
200/204	1965 (1966)	41 mm Kodar	f/8–32	3e	15 ft (4.6 m)	1/60, 1/40	US	
220/224	1965 (1966)	38 mm Reomar	f/5.6–?	3e?	15 ft (4.6 m)	1/125, 1/40	US, EU	
Hawkeye R4	1965	43 mm	f/11	1e	15 ft (4.6 m)	1/90, 1/40	US	Simplified from 104
25/26	1966 (1968)	43 mm	f/11	1e	15 ft (4.6 m)	1/90, 1/40	US, UK, EU	Premium version sold as 26
324	1966	38 mm Reomar	f/2.8–22	3e	2.5 ft (0.76 m)–∞	1/30, 1/250	US, EU	Lens made by Rodenstock
S-10 S-20	1967	35 mm Kodar	f/9.5	?	15 ft (4.6 m)	1/125, 1/40	US	Retractable lens; S-20 adds autoexposure
33/133	1968	43 mm	f/11	1e	15 ft (4.6 m)	1/90, 1/40	UK, EU	33 has two flash contacts similar to 50 & Hawkeye; 133 has flashcube socket
124/174	1968	43 mm	f/11	1e	15 ft (4.6 m)	1/90, 1/40	US	174 adds spring-driven film advance
134	1968	43 mm	f/11	1e	15 ft (4.6 m)	1/90, 1/40	US	
233	1968	41 mm Reomar	f/6.6	?	4 ft (1.2 m)–∞	1/30, 1/80	US, EU	Kodak branded lens
314/414	1968	41 mm Kodar	f/8–32	3e	6 ft (1.8 m) / 2 ft (0.61 m)	1/90, 1/40	US	Two-position focus with close-up range; 414 adds spring-powered film advance
333	1968	43 mm	f/11	1e	15 ft (4.6 m)	10–1/300	EU	CdS photocell
714/814	1968	38 mm Ektar	f/2.8–64	3e	3 ft (0.91 m)–∞	1/60 – 1/250 (+ 1/30)	US	CdS metering photocell; 814 adds spring-driven film advance
11/44	1969	43 mm	f/11	1e	15 ft (4.6 m)	1/90, 1/40	US	11, sold in Brazil, deletes flashcube socket
Hawkeye A-1	1969	43 mm	f/11	1e	15 ft (4.6 m)	1/90, 1/40	US	Basically identical to 134
Hawkeye II	1969	43 mm	f/11	1e	15 ft (4.6 m)	1/90, 1/40	US	Basically identical to 44
Hawkeye X	1971	43 mm	f/11	1e	15 ft (4.6 m)	1/90, 1/40	US	Basically identical to X-15

Instamatic Reflex kit lenses (Note: Fully compatible with interchangeable DKL-mount lenses for Kodak Retina Reflex S and later cameras.)
Focal length	Mfr.	Aperture range	Construction	Focus
45 mm Xenar		f/2.8–?	4e	3.3 ft (1.0 m)–∞
50 mm Xenon		f/1.9–?	6e	2 ft (0.61 m)–∞

== Gallery ==
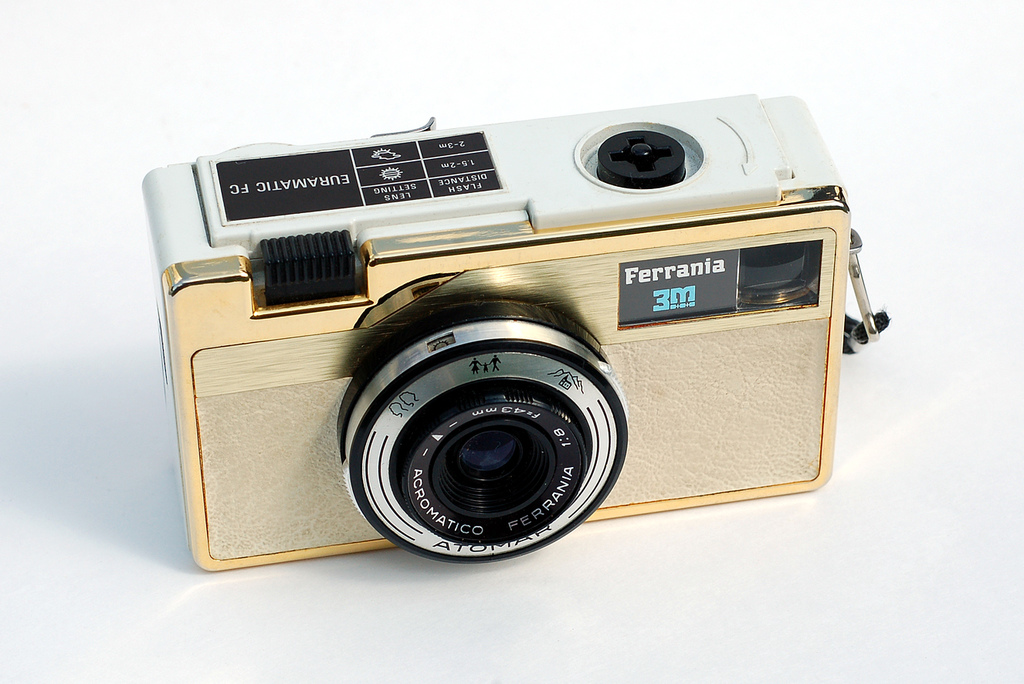
Ferrania-3M EURAMATIC FC (1964) Made in Italy

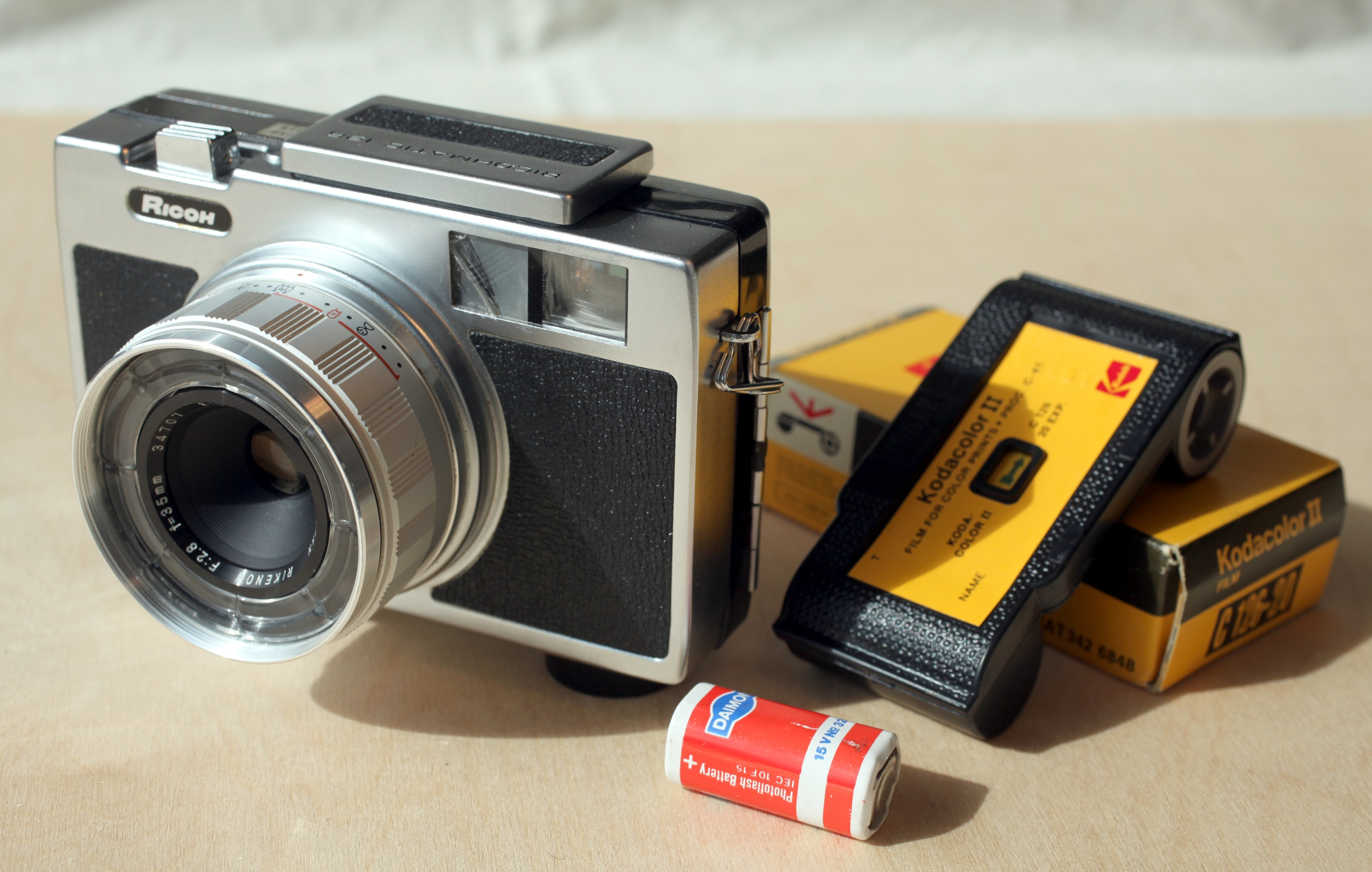
Ricoh RICOHMATIC 126 (1965) with Spring motor, Made in Japan

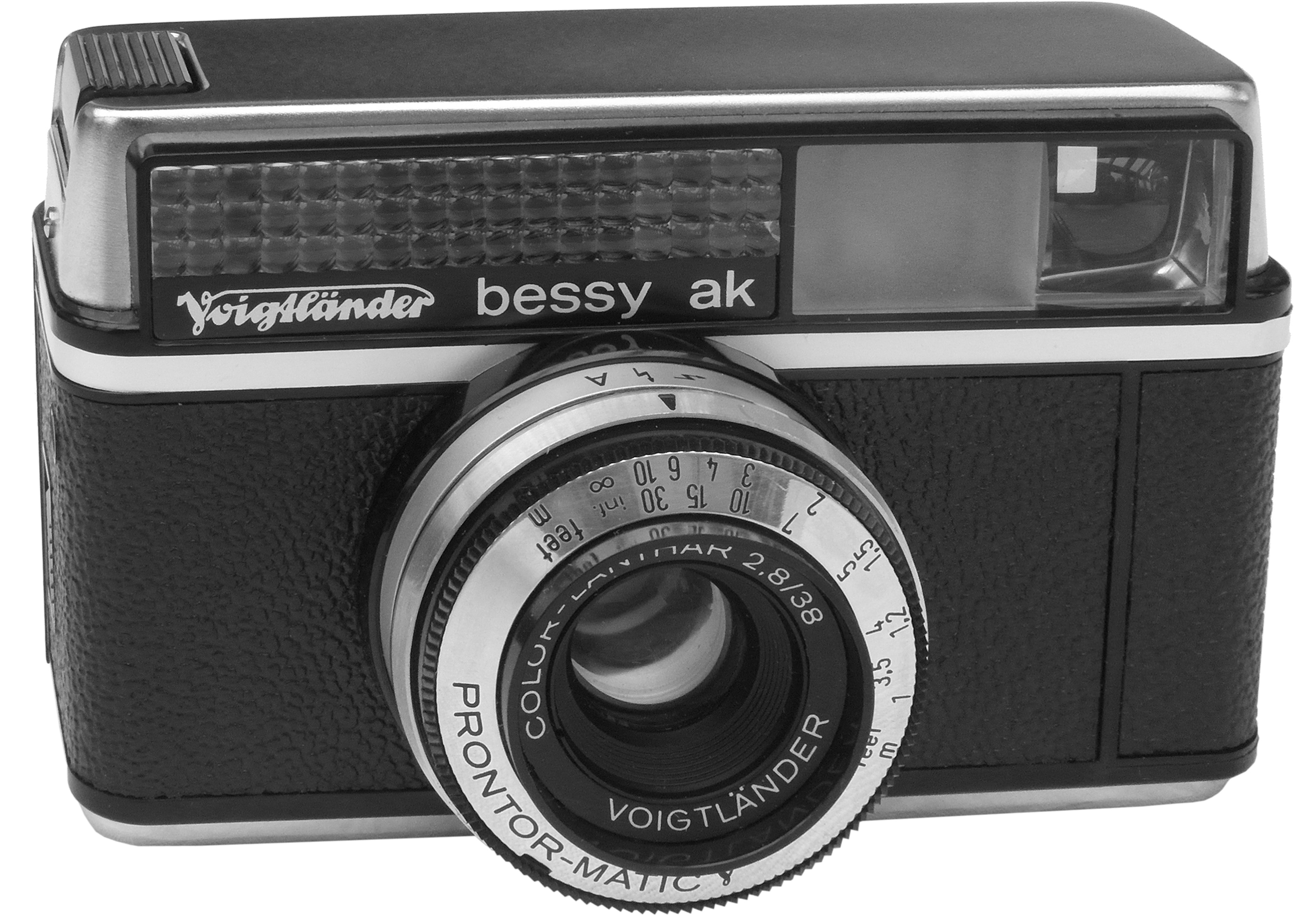
Voigtländer bessy ak (1965) Made in Germany

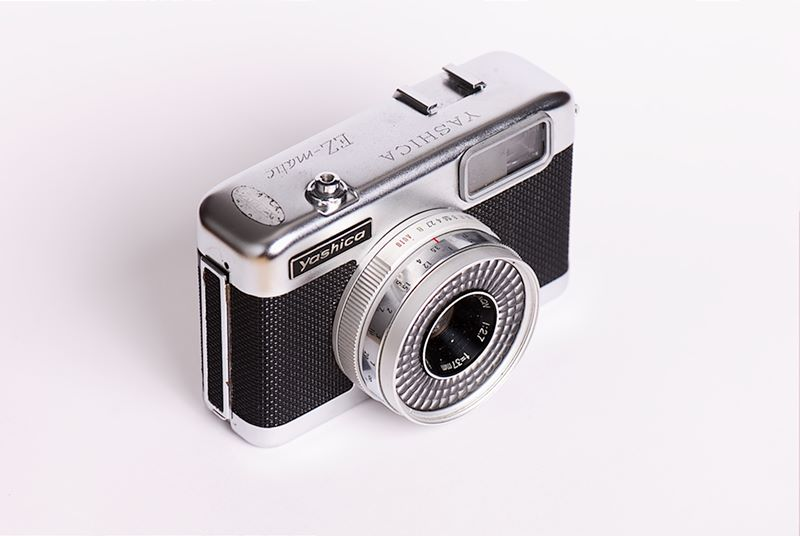
Yashica EZ-matic (1965) Made in Japan

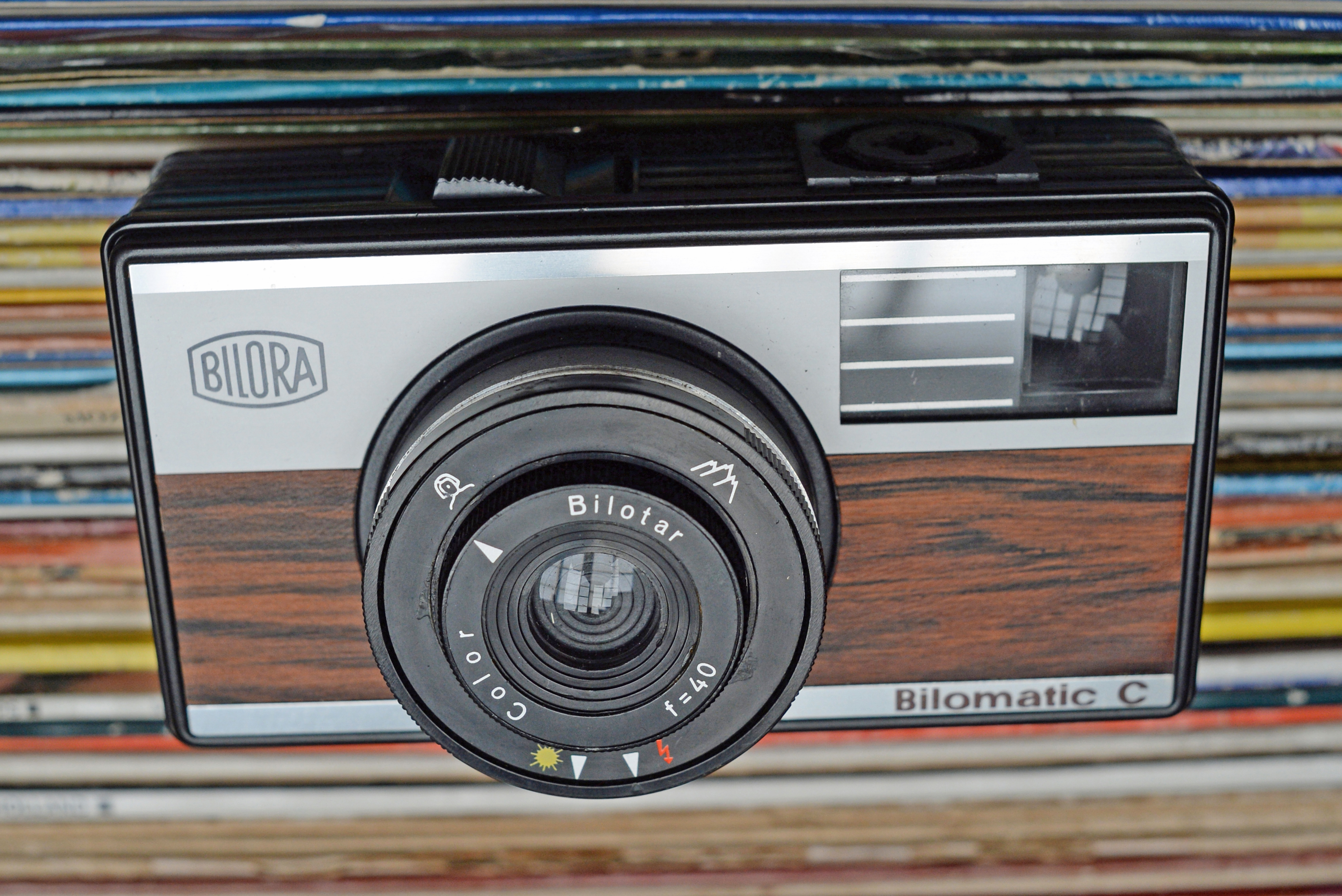
Bilora Bilomatic C (1966) Made in Germany

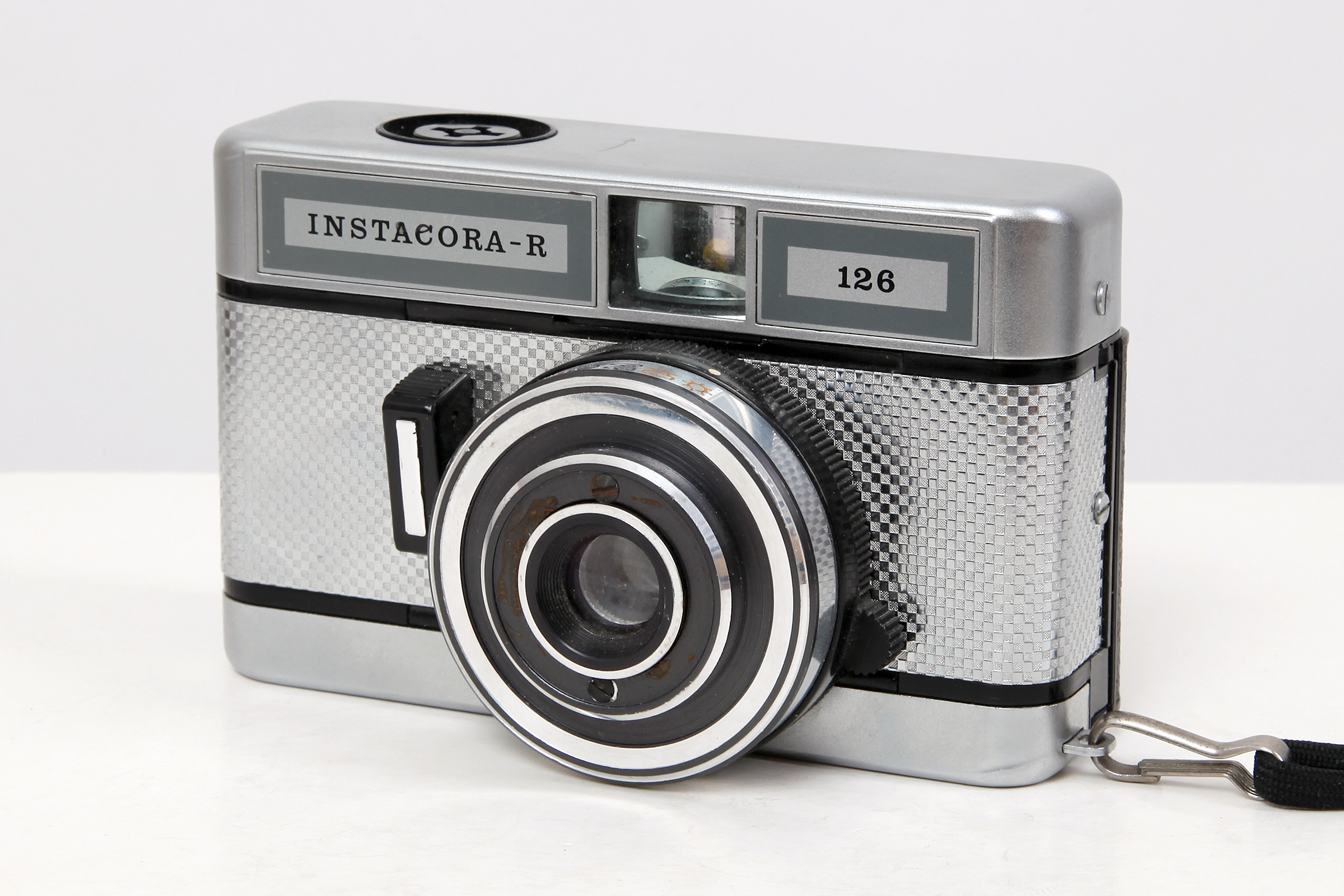
Dacora INSTACORA-R 126 (1966) Made in Germany

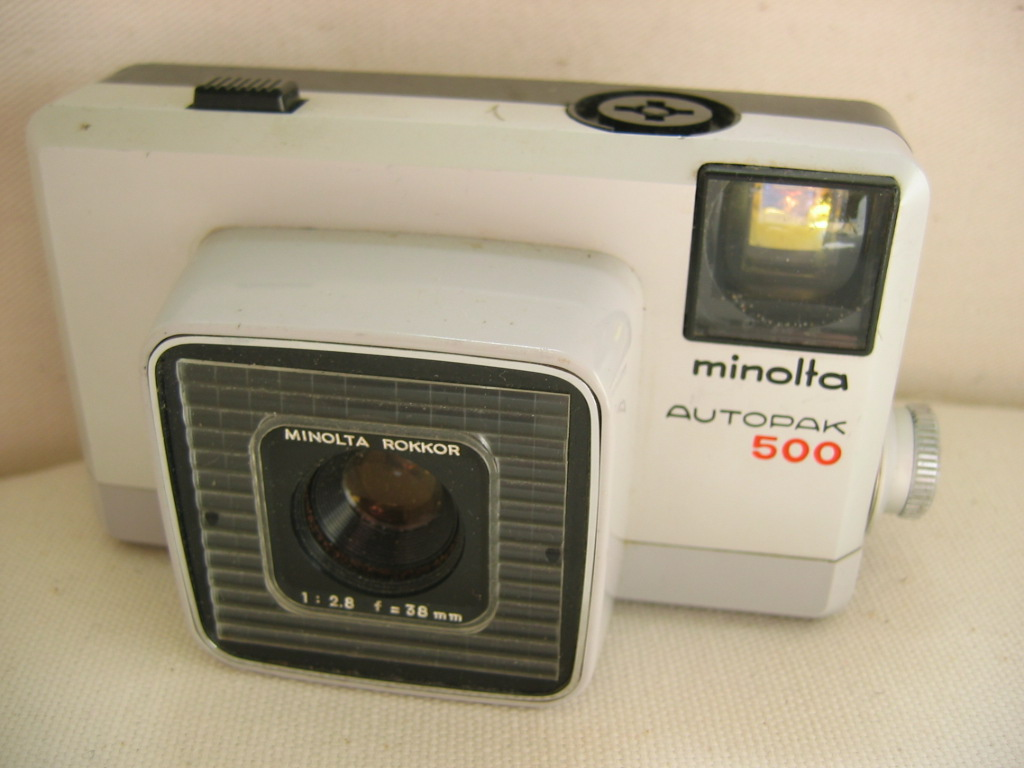
minolta AUTOPAK 500 (1966) Made in Japan

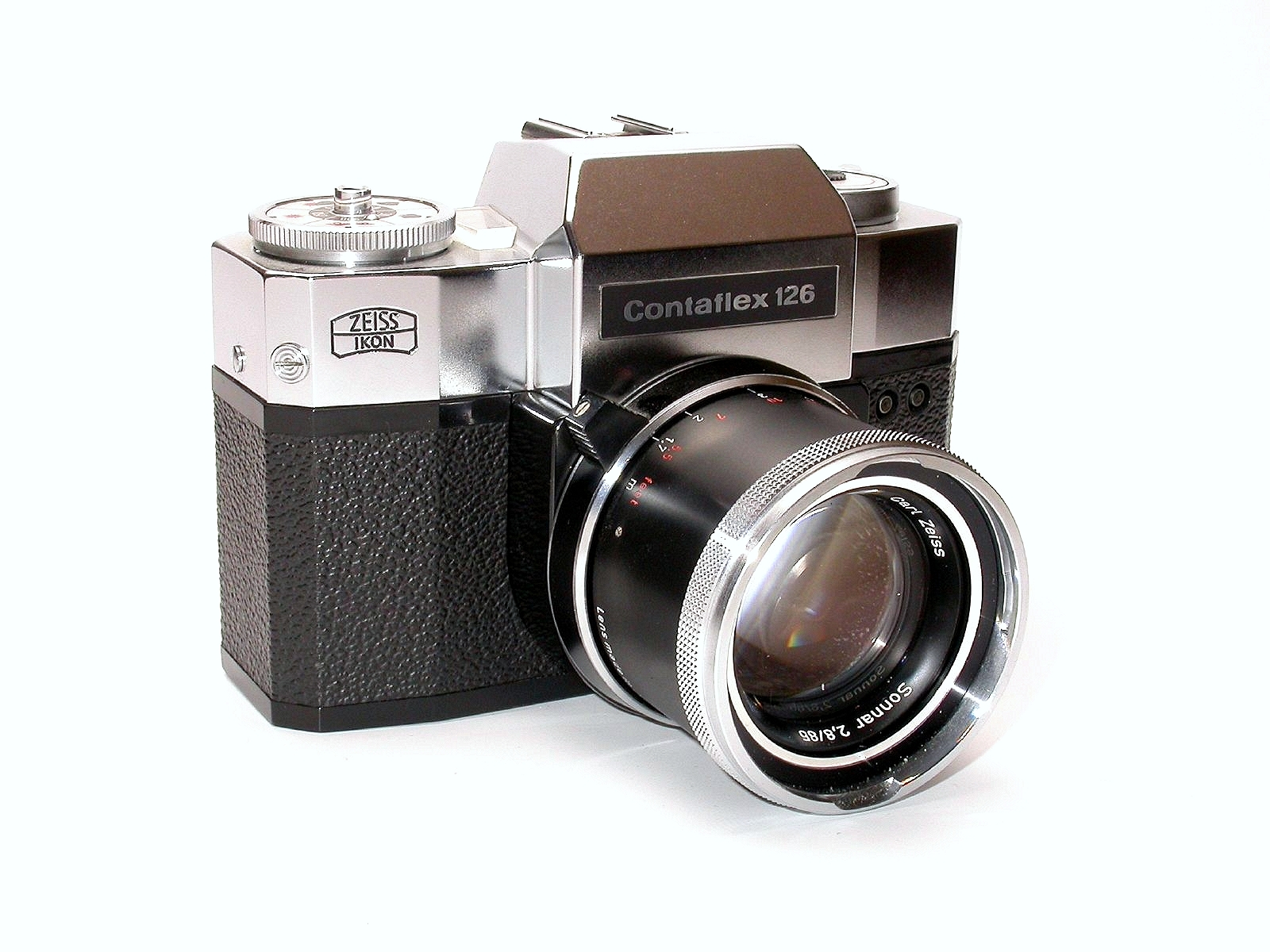
ZI Contaflex 126 (1967) Made in Germany

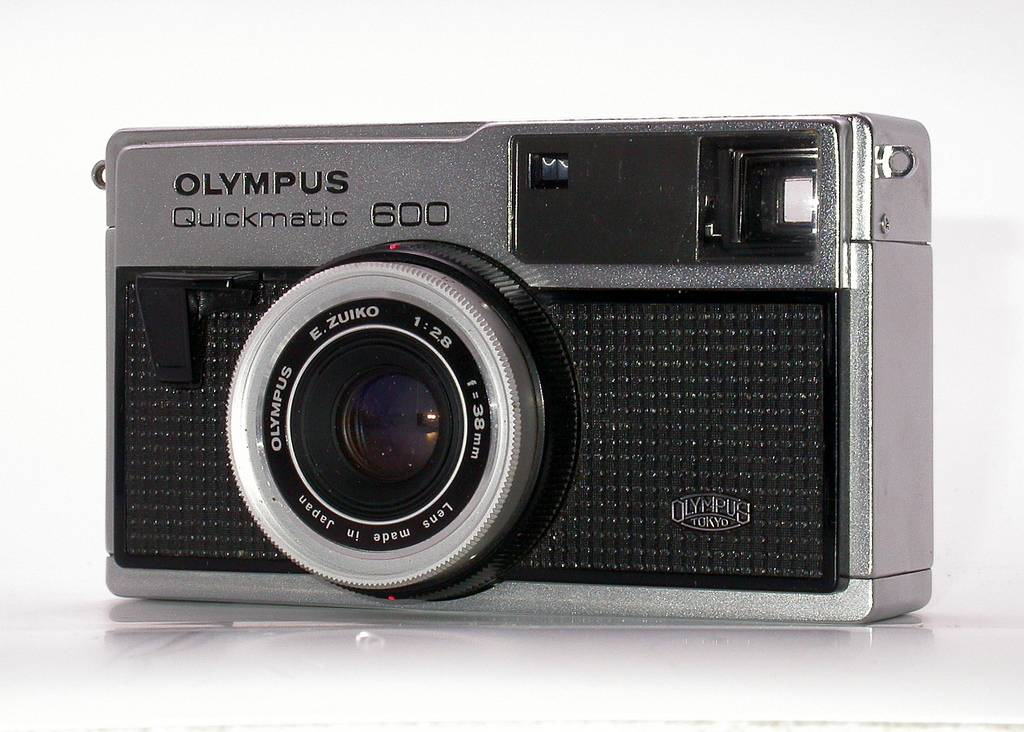
OLYMPUS Quickmatic 600 (1967) Made in Japan

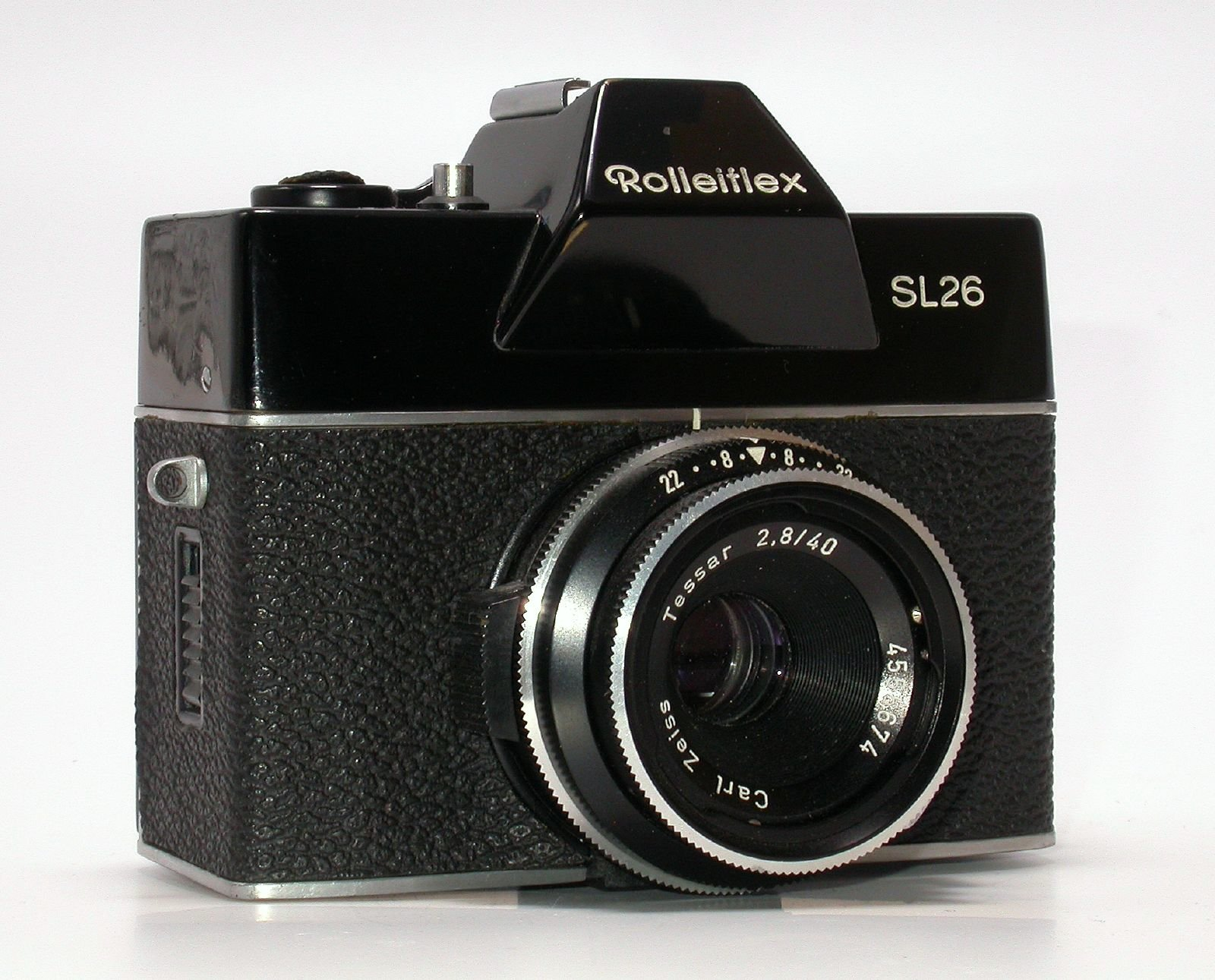
Rolleiflex SL26 (1968) Made in Germany

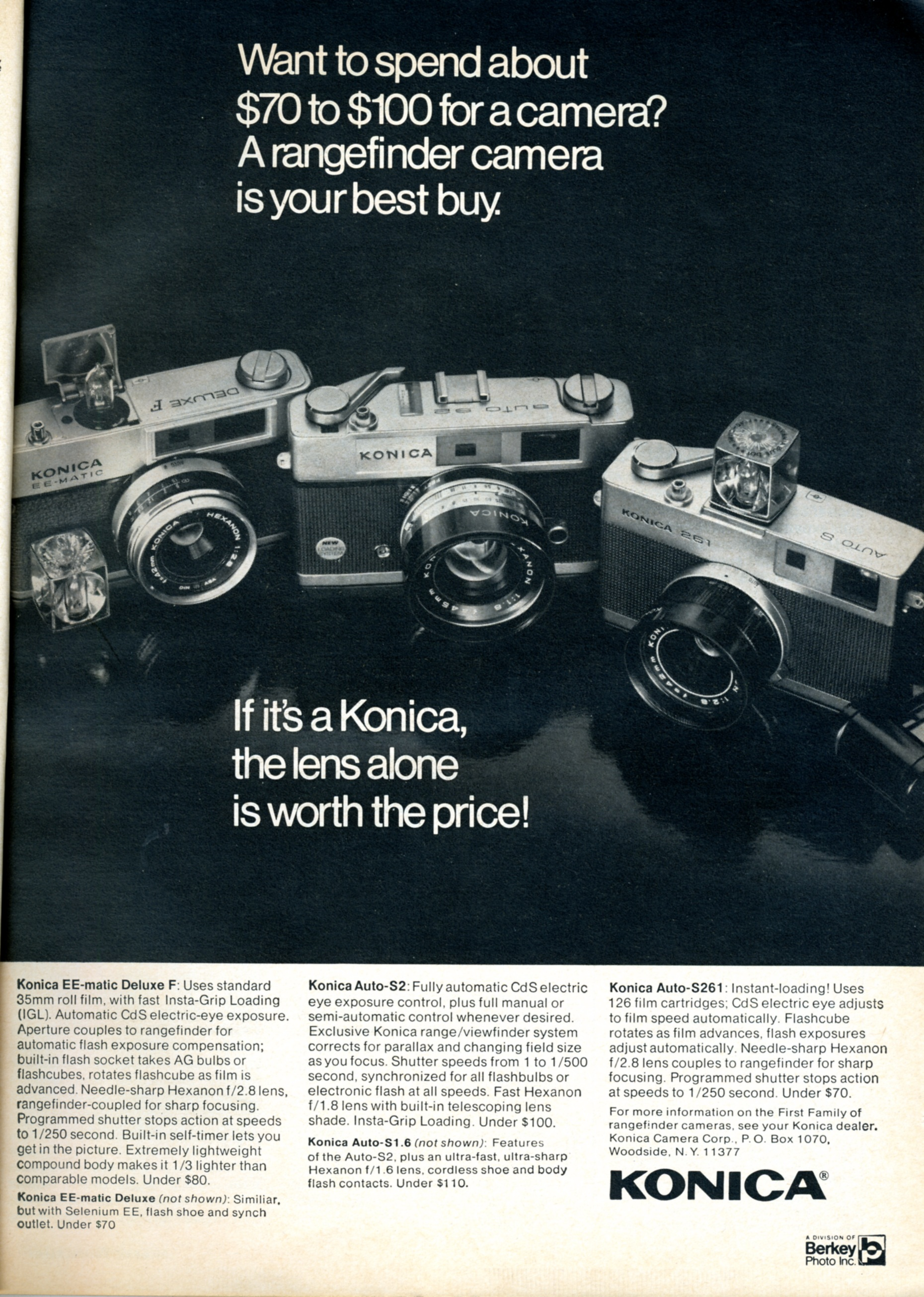
KONICA AUTO-S261 (1968) - First from right, made in Japan

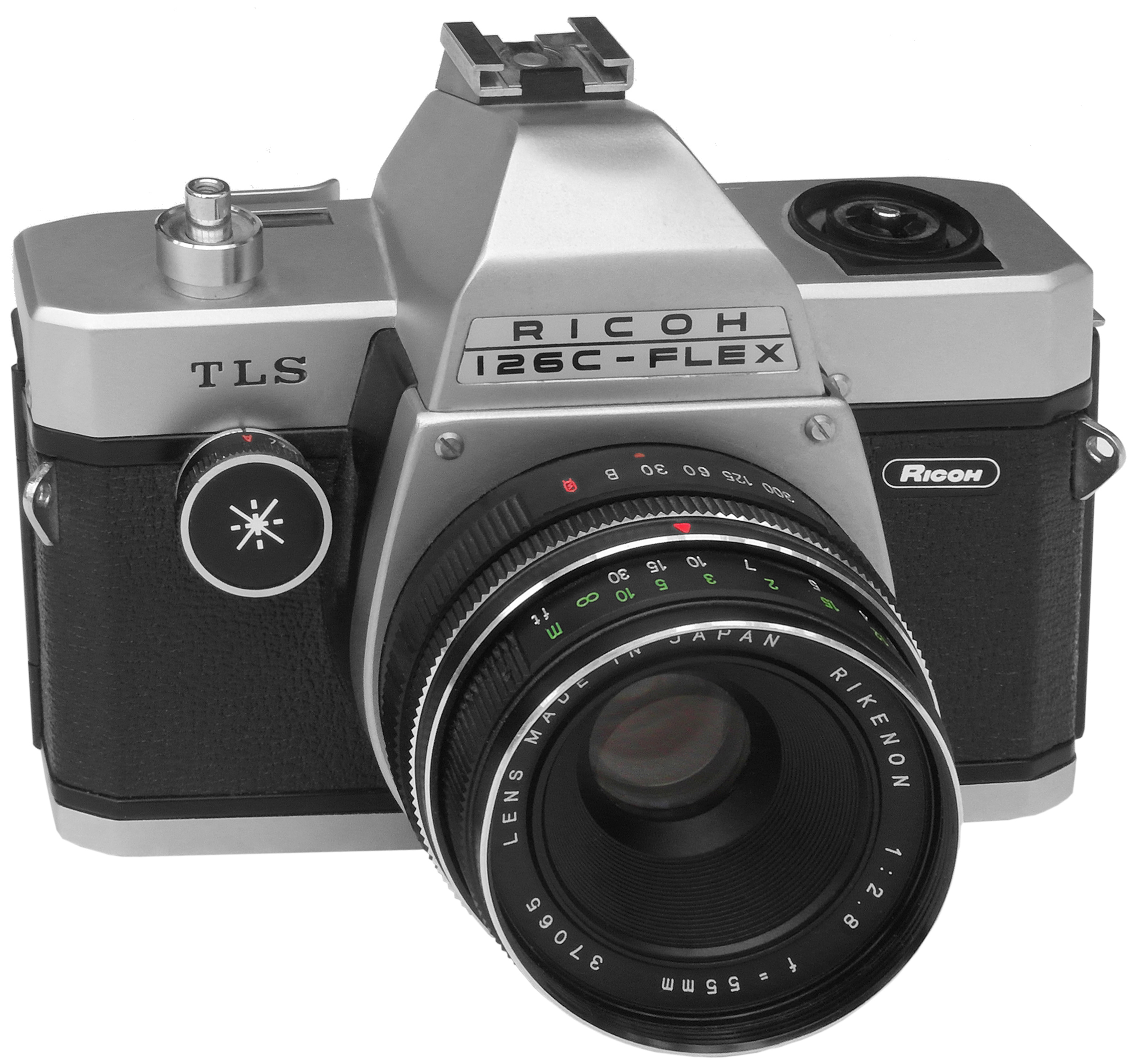
RICOH 126C-FLEX TLS (1969) Made in Japan

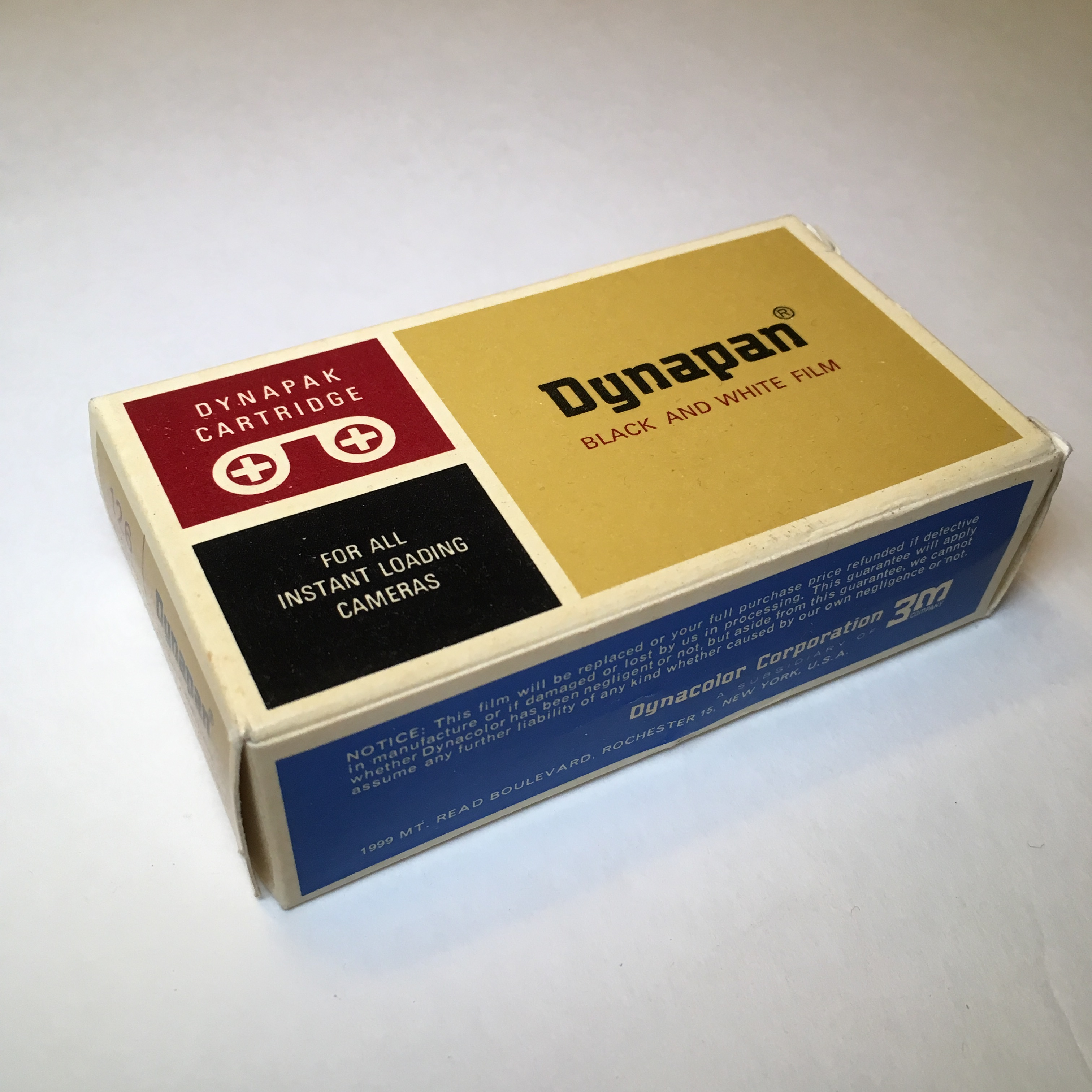
Dynapan (1969) Made in England

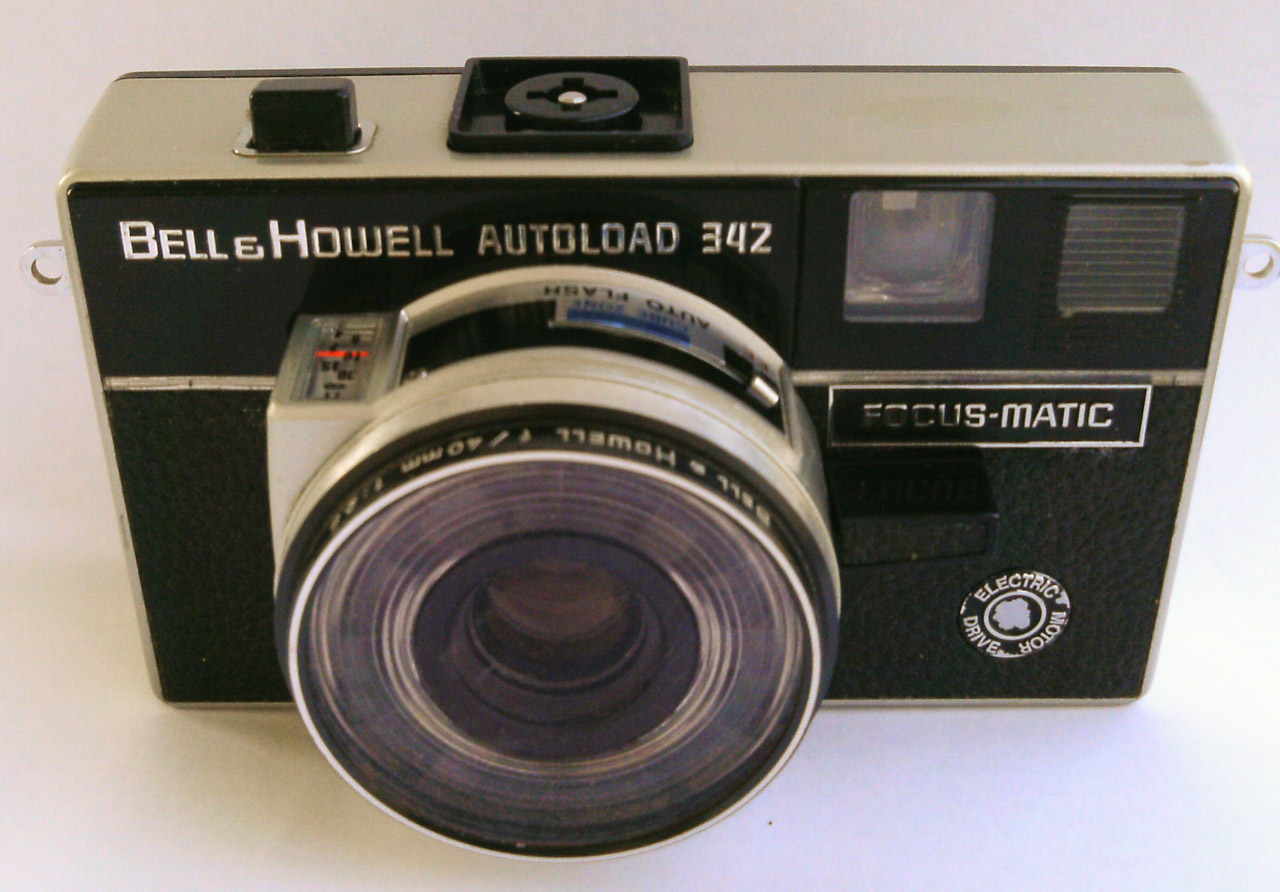
BELL&HOWELL AUTOLOAD 342 (1969) Made in Japan (Canon)

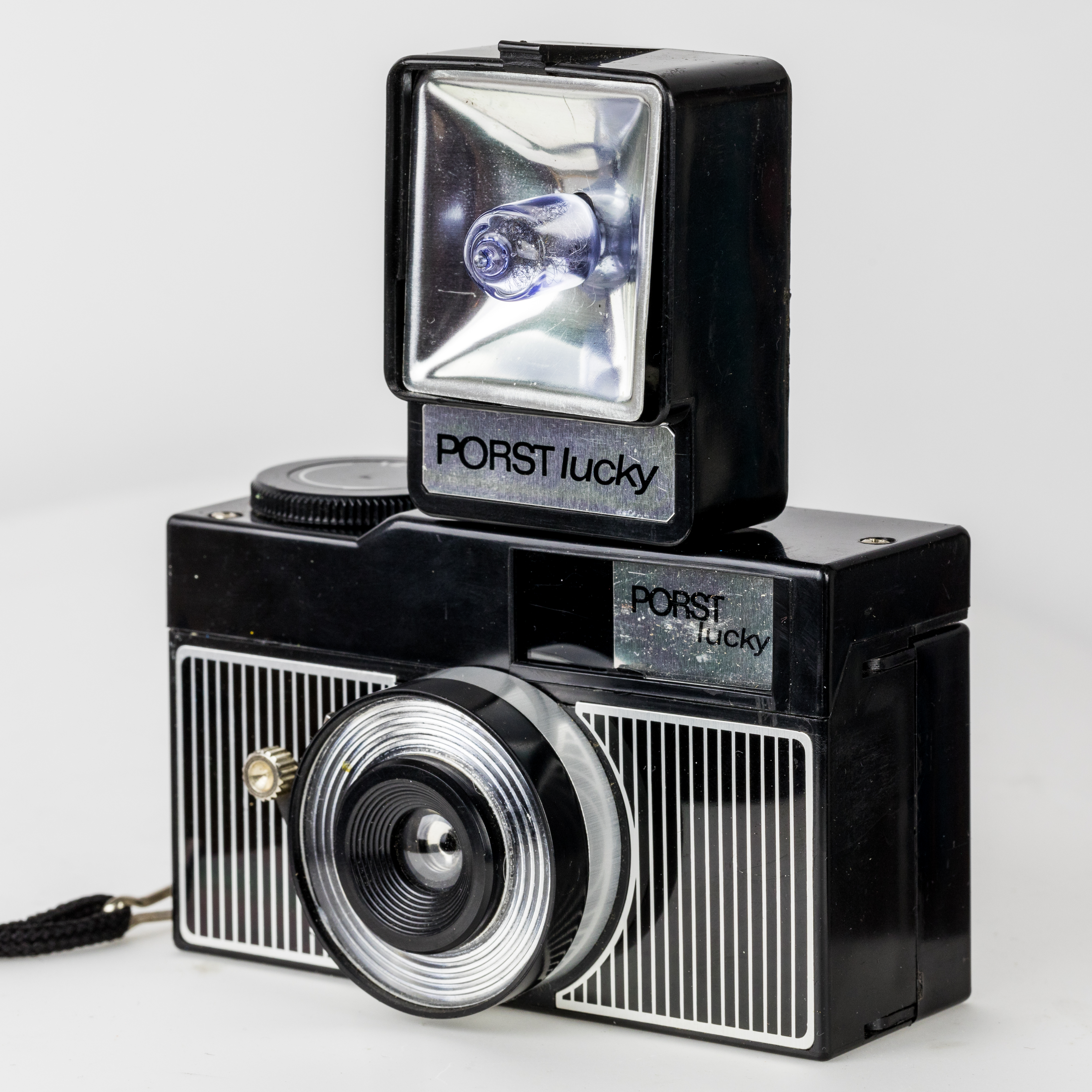
PORST lucky (1969) with Flash bulb, Made in Hong Kong

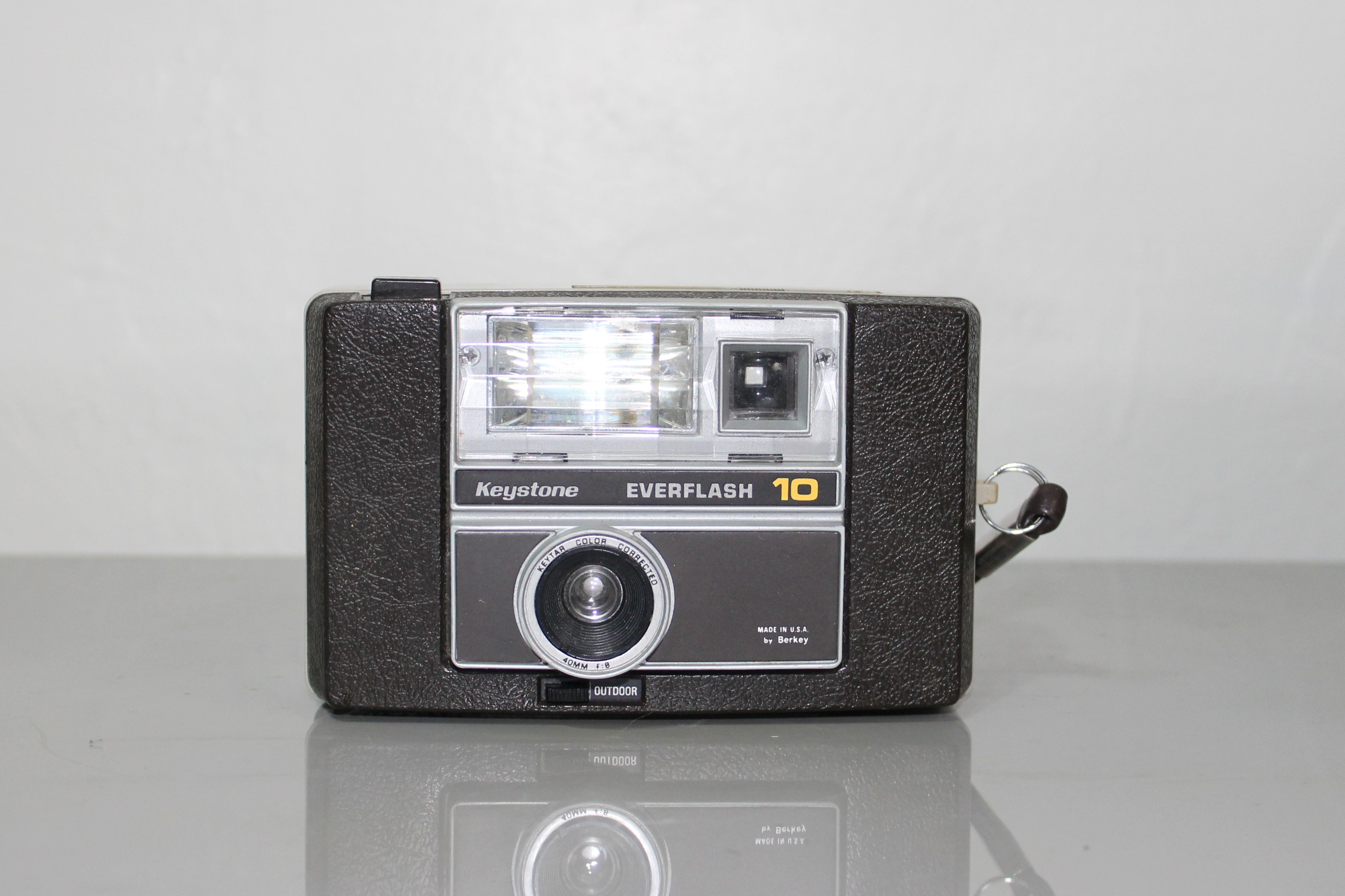
Keystone EVERFLASH 10 (1971) with Electronic Flash, Made in U.S.A.

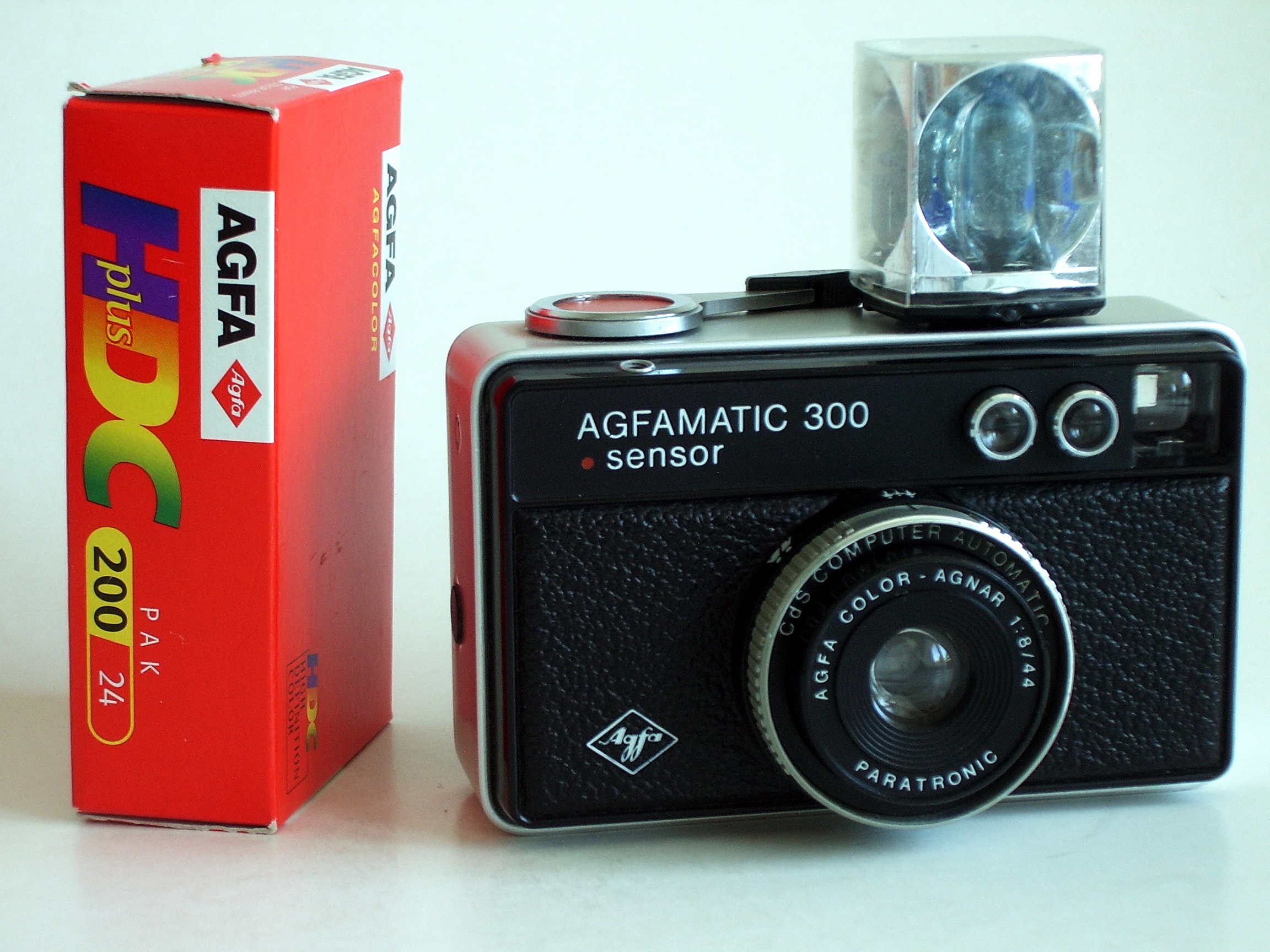
AGFAMATIC 300 sensor (1972) witn Magicube, Made in Germany

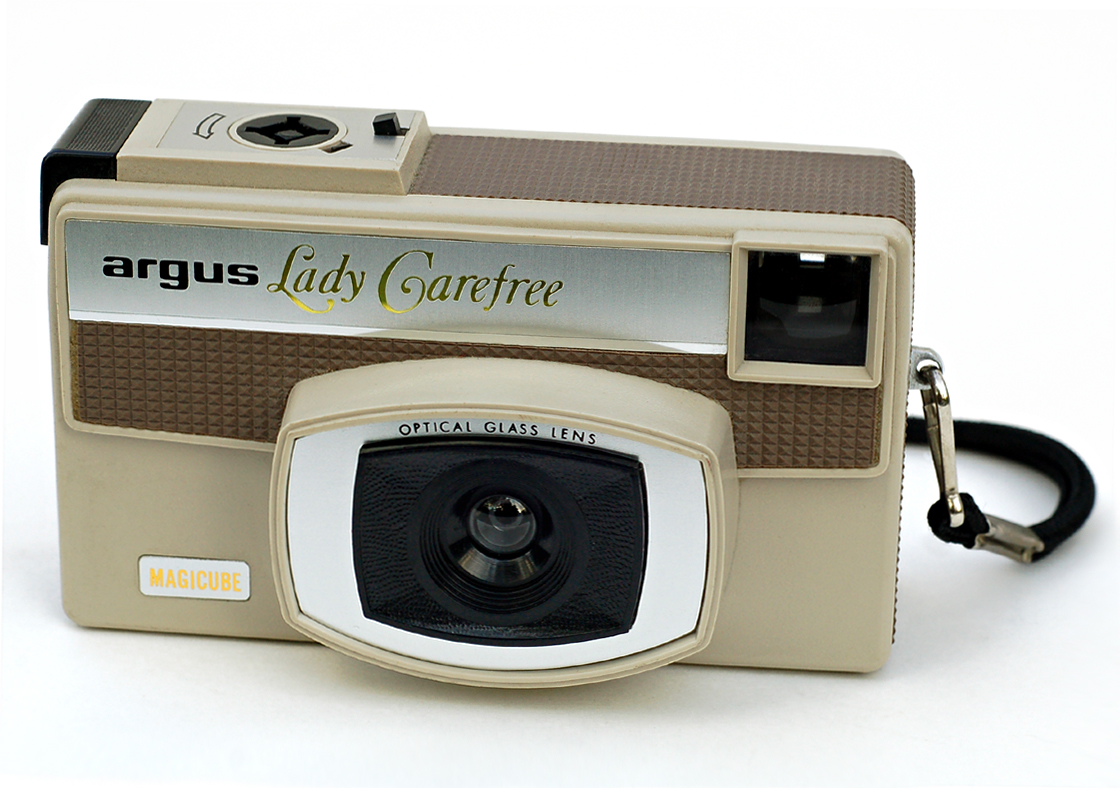
argus Lady Carefree (1972) Made in Japan (Sedic)

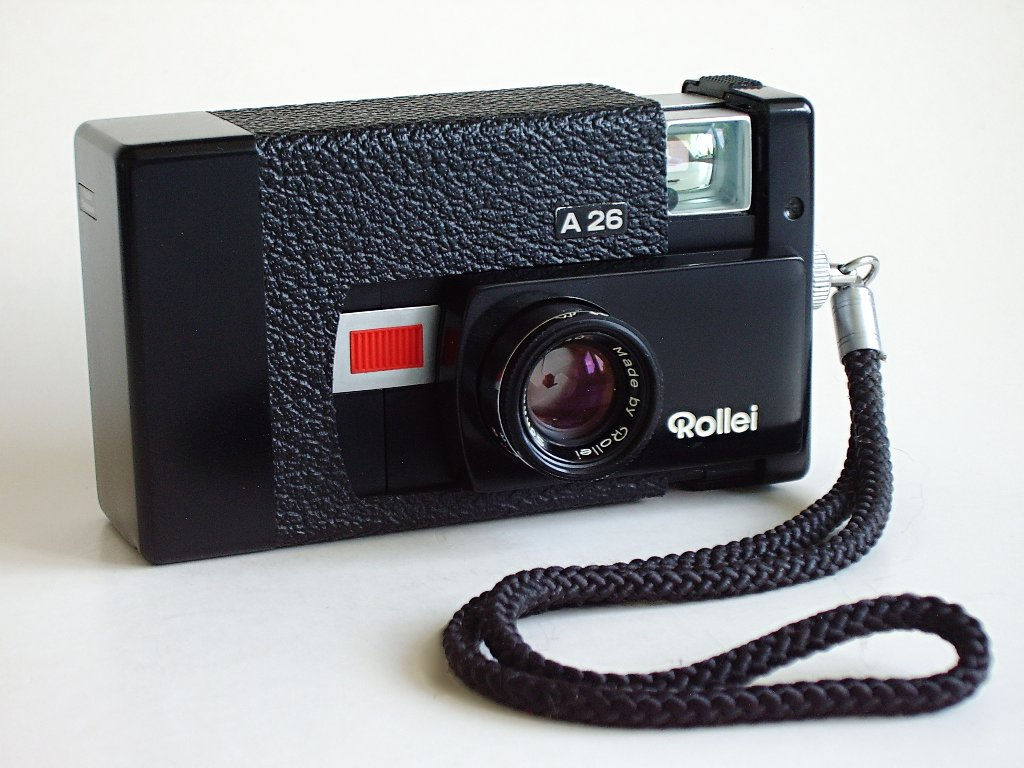
Rollei A26 (1972) Made in Germany

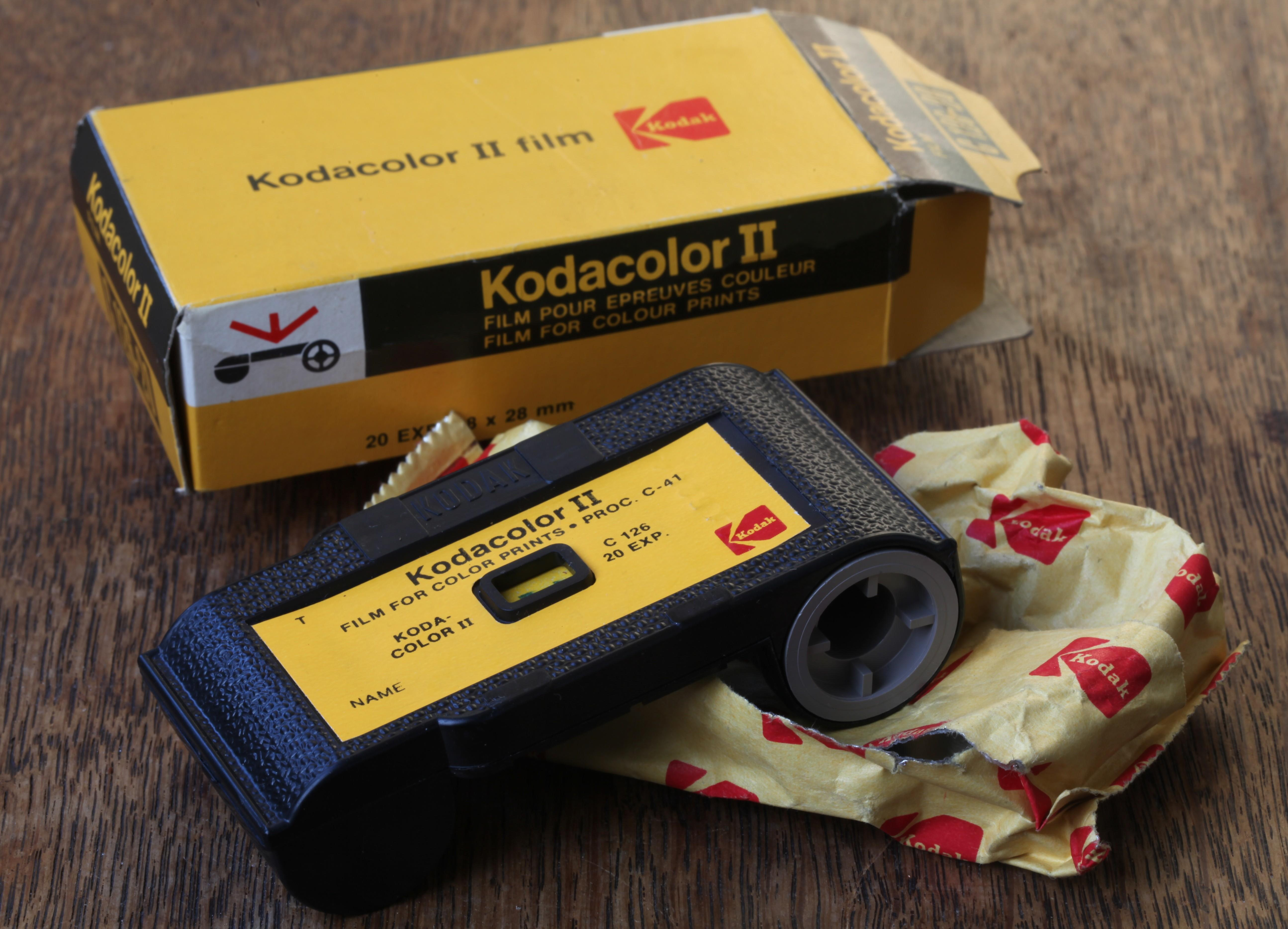
Kodacolor II (1973) Instamatic-Film

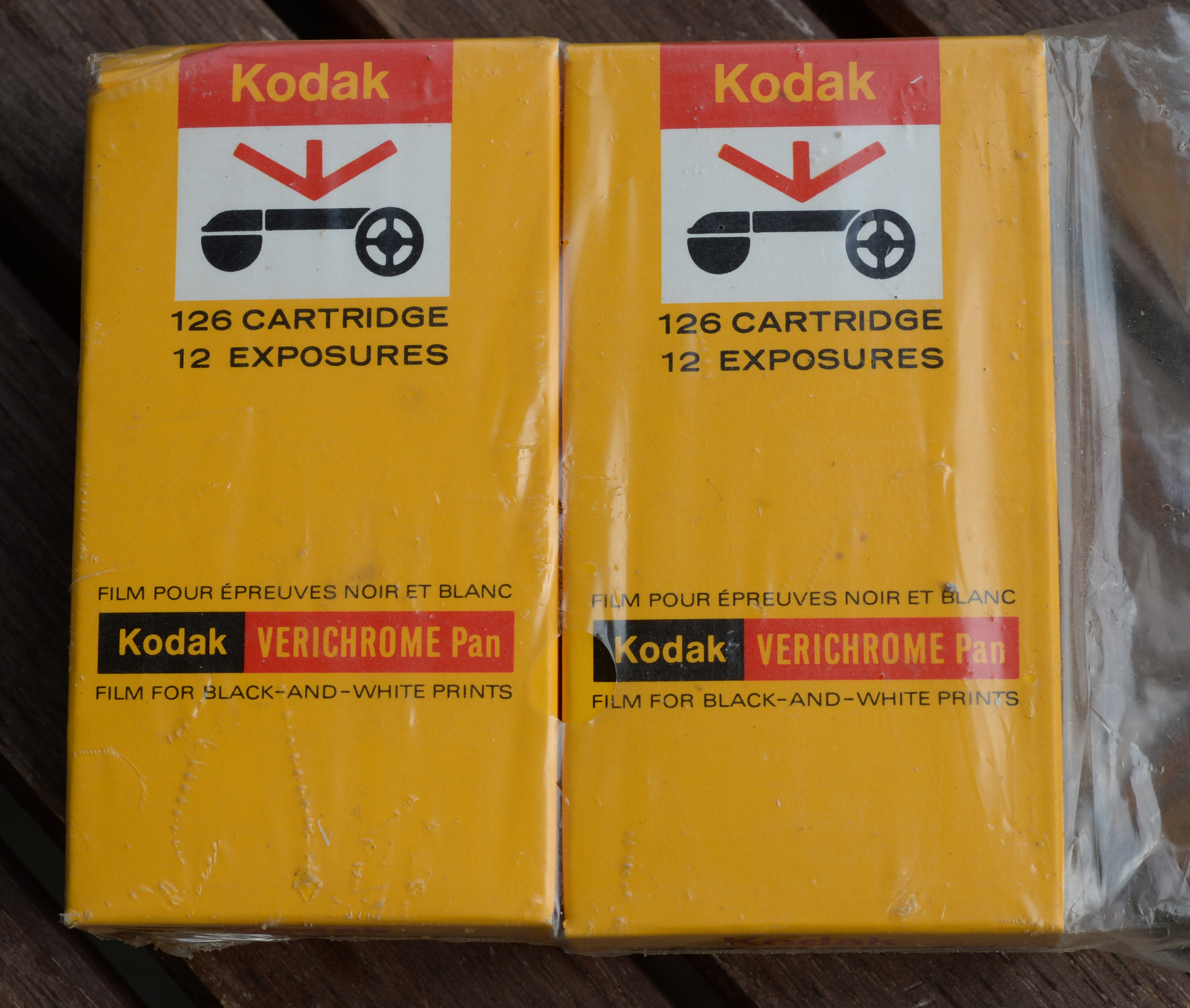
Kodak Verichrome Pan (1975) Instamatic-Film, Made in Canada

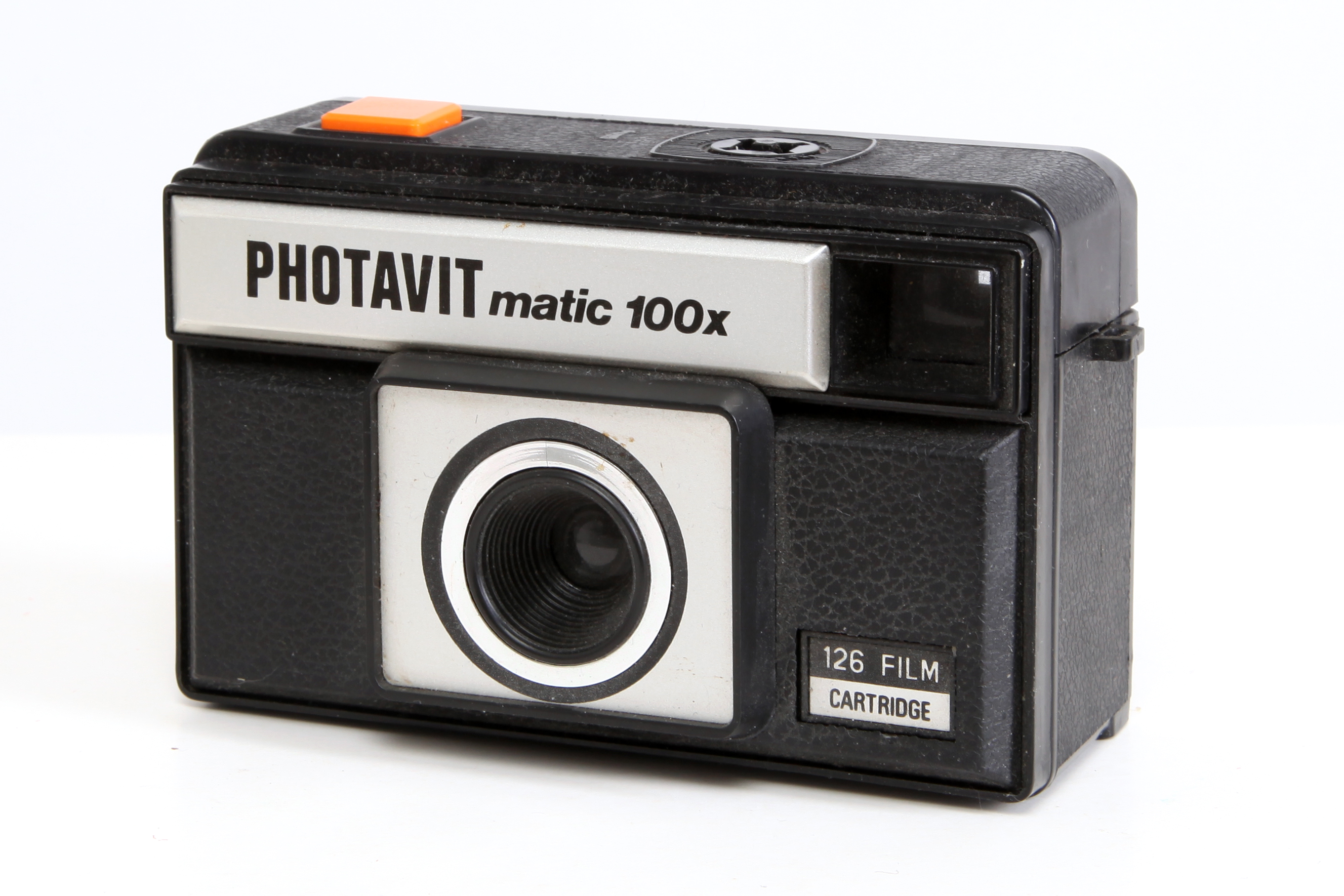
PHOTAVIT matic 100x (1977) Made in Singapore

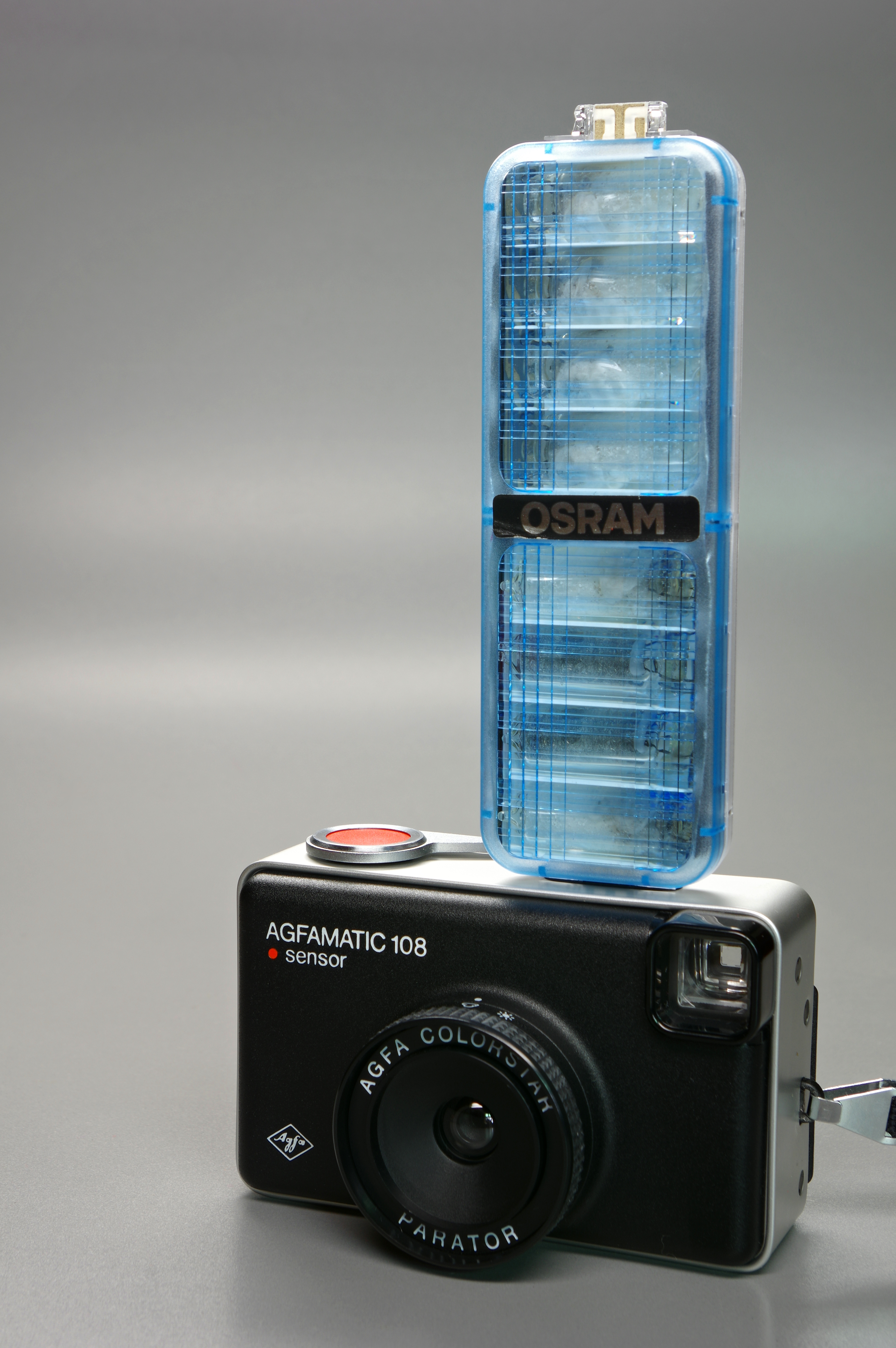
AGFAMATIC 108 Sensor (1978) with Flip Flash, Made in Germany

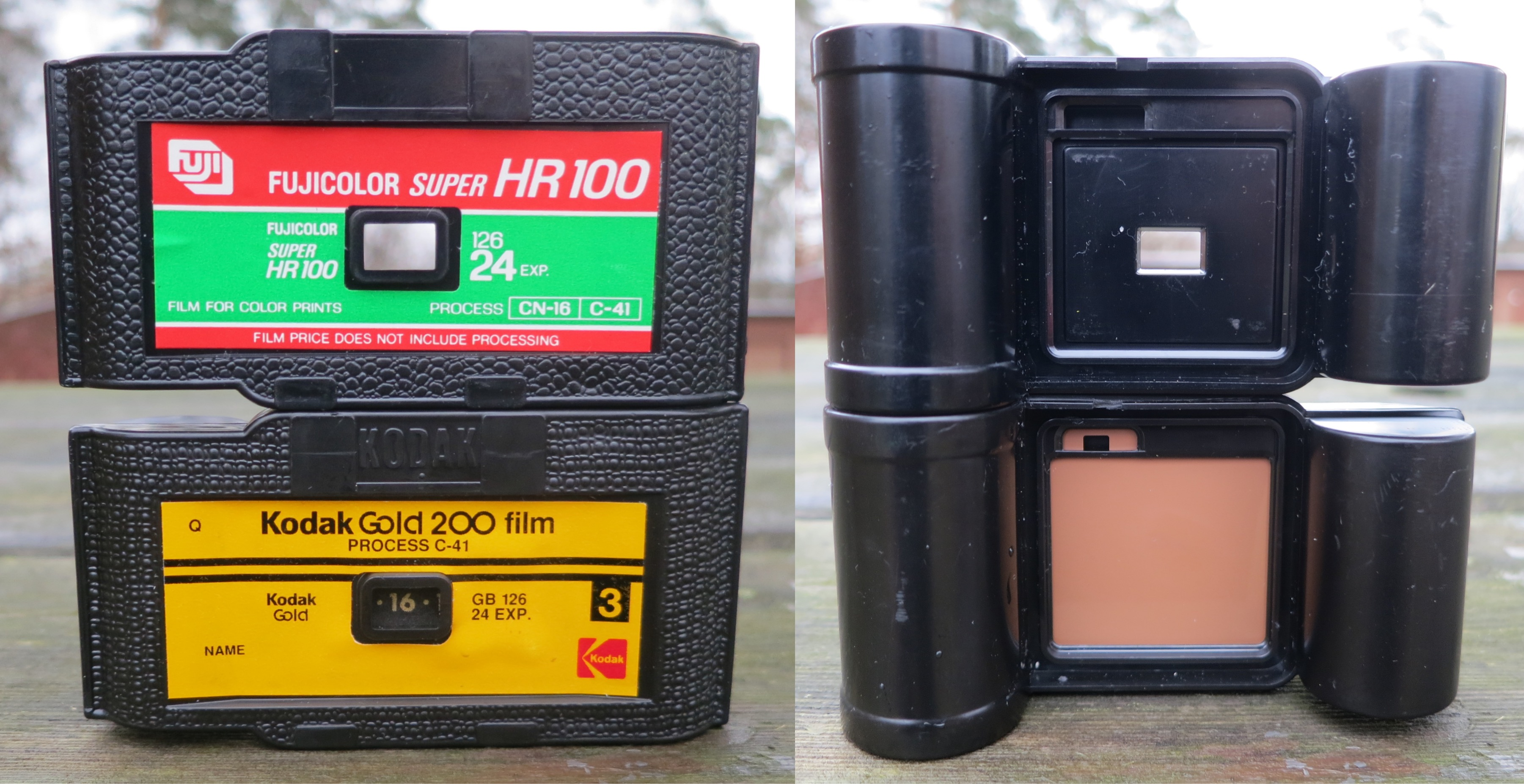
FUJICOLOR SUPER HR 100 (1986–?) and Kodak Gold 200 (1988–?)

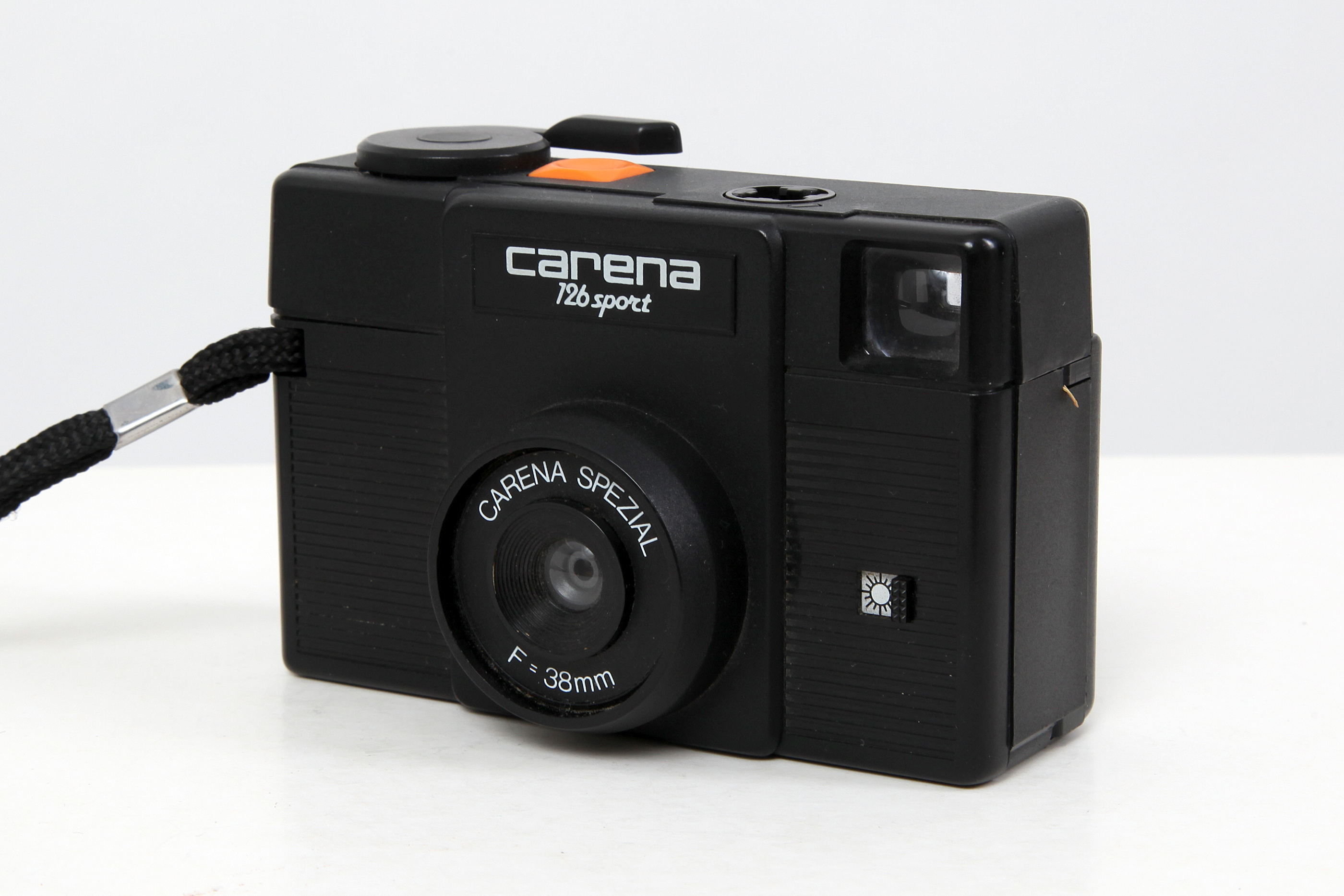
carena 126 sport (1988) by PHOTO PORST West Germany, Made in Singapore

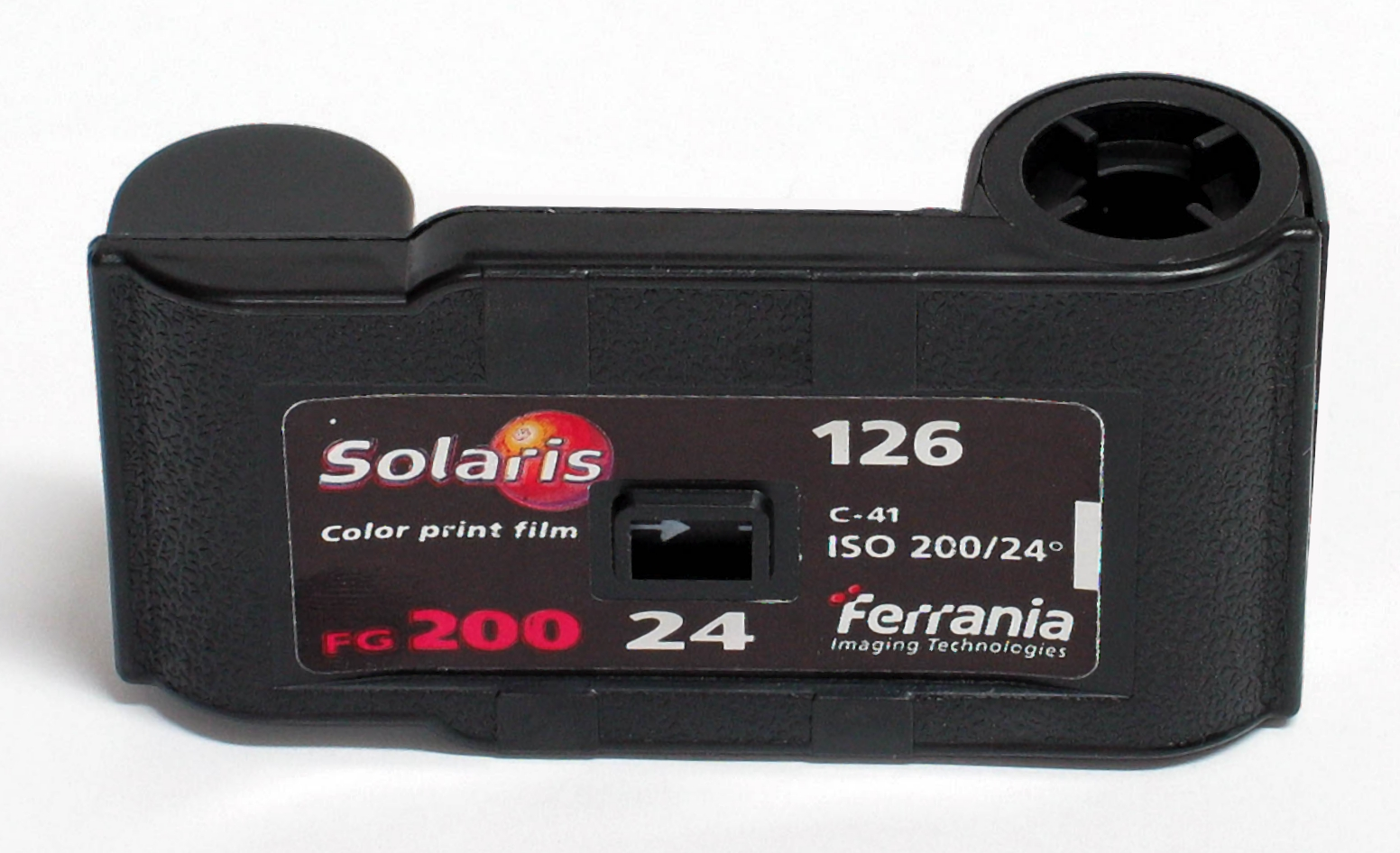
Ferrania Solaris FG200 (Discontinued in 2007) Made in Italy

== See also ==
- List of defunct consumer brands
