= Large format lens =

Photographic optic

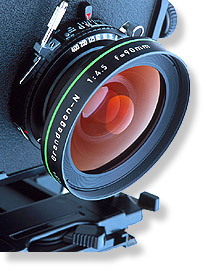
Rodenstock Grandagon-N wide-angle lens for large format cameras

Large format lenses are photographic optics that provide an image circle large enough to cover the large format film or plates used in large format cameras.

== Image coverage ==
Photographic optics generally project a circular image which is only required to have acceptable correction of aberrations over a diameter comparable to the largest intended film/sensor dimension (typically the frame diagonal) with little room to spare. Lenses may be able to produce a considerably larger image circle than is needed (notably long focus lenses), but when optimised for a given image format, typically mask off this excess coverage to minimize reflections and improve contrast.

Lenses typically are set with the optical axis perpendicular to and centered on the film/sensor plane, and the lens is shifted along its axis to focus an image on the film/sensor plane. However, some medium and many large format cameras are designed to accommodate additional lens movements for creative control of composition, perspective, and framing, tilting and shifting the optical axis relative to the film plane. Cameras with these additional lens movements include view and technical cameras. To accommodate these lens movements without significant corner vignetting, a larger image circle is required. For this reason, large format lenses often produce image circles significantly larger than the film/sensor diagonal dimension.

Compared to mainstream cameras that typically have non-interchangeable lenses and/or focal plane shutters built into the camera body, another difference with medium and especially large format lenses is that they are typically interchangeable in a very simple manner, being mounted in a "lens board", and the shutter is mounted within the lens, usually close to the diaphragm in the middle of the lens. This shutter is tripped directly at the lens (possibly using a cable release), not by a release on the camera body

== Lens designs ==
Note: much of the text in this section is applicable to camera lenses for all formats, not only large format lenses

Lenses of the same general construction are often given a name implying this design. For example, a Tessar always has four elements in three groups as described below, although Tessars have been produced with different focal lengths and maximum apertures for many decades. Sometimes a name does not identify a specific design; Kodak's Ektar lens brand name encompasses many different types. Sometimes different manufacturers use different names for lenses of the same type; for example, the Voigtländer Skopar is of Tessar design. And sometimes identical lenses are sold under different names and at different prices; for example, lenses branded as Rodenstock and Calder.

Early lenses suffered from flare and low contrast, worsening as the number of lens-air interfaces increased. The introduction of and improvements in anti-reflective coatings vastly reduced flare; some many-element lens designs which had been abandoned due to low contrast in spite of otherwise excellent performance became practical. Lenses designed for use with monochromatic film, first orthochromatic, then panchromatic, had less exacting requirements regarding chromatic aberrations than when colour film is used. When using older lenses today one should check those chromatic aberrations and flare are acceptable for the application.

=== Wide-angle lens designs ===
The term wide-angle lens denotes a lens that has an image circle diameter significantly larger than the lens focal length.

Notes	Diagram
The Goerz Dagor (1892) has two symmetrical, cemented triplets (6 elements in 2 groups) and is derived from the Protar. The two outer elements are positive, one of the inner elements is used to correct spherical aberration, and the other to flatten the field. There are only 4 glass-to-air interfaces, giving better flare and contrast than lenses with more elements, particularly important before the introduction of coated lenses. Reputed to have good sharpness and a large image circle, although there is softness at the edges.	Dagor
The Hypergon (1900) is a wide angle lens that covers a flat field. It is constructed symmetrically consisting of two deep meniscus elements that almost form a sphere. The aperture is limited to f/20 due to spherical and chromatic aberrations, but the angle of view is 130° at small apertures.	Hypergon
The Topogon (1933) is a double Gauss design arranged in a symmetrical design. Due to its wide-angle coverage, and the small distortion, it and its licensed derivative Metrogon became the standard aerial lens until it was displaced in 1952.	Topogon
The Angénieux retrofocus (1950) design, sometimes called an inverted telephoto, is the dominant wide-angle lens configuration for SLR cameras which require sufficient space between the rear element and the film / sensor plane for the moving mirror. The inverted telephoto design dates back to the 1930s, but Angénieux's design and "retrofocus" naming have endured as genericized trademarks.	Angénieux retrofocus
The Biogon (1954) is an ultra-wide-angle design by Ludwig Bertele based on a double-ended reversed-telephoto objective. It was made by Zeiss for their 35mm Contax and the medium-format Hasselblad cameras. The design was physically large, being two focal lengths in length and one focal length in diameter. There are two menisci at the front and a single strong meniscus element at the rear. The rear element is close to the film plane for low distortion and better contrast but interferes with the mirror on a single-lens reflex camera.	Biogon
The Hologon (1966) is a modification of the Biogon lens design. It contains a rear element that is close to film plane for better contrast but interferes with the mirror for SLR. There is significant light falloff at the edges, so it is frequently used with ND center graduated filters.	Hologon

=== Normal lens designs ===
The term wide-angle lens denotes a lens that has an image circle diameter approximately the same as the lens focal length

Notes	Diagram
Anastigmat is an achromatic lens used to reduce or eliminate astigmatism designed specifically for photographic applications. The first anastigmat was designed by Paul Rudolph in 1890 and marketed as the Zeiss Anastigmat which was renamed Protar after that term became a generic trademark. All modern lenses are anastigmatic; lenses produced in the early days when this was a new feature often had the word Anastigmat in their name: for example, Voigtländer Anastigmat Skopar.	Protar
The Cooke Triplet (1893), as its name suggests, consists of three elements in three groups, one of the simplest anastigmatic lens designs. It was designed by H. Dennis Taylor.	Cooke Triplet
A Planar (1896) design is one with 4 groups of 6 elements and a flat field design. Its symmetrical optical double Gauss configuration produces low spherical aberration and astigmatism. The design was not widely used until coating processes were available, due to the very low contrast caused by light loss from a large number of transmission surfaces.	Planar
The Heliar (1900) design consists of 5 elements in three groups with cemented doublets, allowing correction of spherical, chromatic, and astigmatic aberrations. It can be regarded as a variant of the Cooke Triplet.	Heliar
A Tessar (1902) comprises four elements in three groups, one positive crown glass element on the front, one negative flint glass element at the center, and a negative plano-concave flint glass element cemented with a positive convex crown glass element at the rear. It was designed by Paul Rudolph. Like the Heliar, the Tessar may be compared to the Cooke Triplet, having split the rear element into a cemented doublet, although the direct antecedent of the Tessar was the Protar. Many manufacturers have produced lenses of this type under their own names. The Tessar design is suitable for front-element focussing, but unit focussing is used on large format cameras.	Tessar
The Artar is a true apochromatic 4-element in 4 groups symmetrical process lens for the graphic arts, very well corrected for other aberrations. It was designed by Walter Zschokke of Goerz in 1904, based on Emile Von Hoegh's dialyte. If uncoated it is subject to flare due to the 8 air-to-glass surfaces.	Artar
The Sonnar (1929) design originally had six elements, later seven, in three groups. The design uses fewer elements than the Planar design and is smaller and less expensive; it too is considered to be derived from the Cooke Triplet. It has more aberrations but better contrast and less flare than the Planar, a larger maximum aperture, and lower chromatic aberration than the Tessar. Large format Sonnars have good sharpness and contrast at large apertures but are large and heavy, and coverage does not allow much use of movements. The Sonnar has a good edge contrast at all apertures, but some softness at wide apertures.	Sonnar

=== Telephoto lens designs ===
The term long-focus lens denotes a lens that has a focal length significantly longer than the image circle diameter. For small formats such as 35mm, extreme long focus lenses can be found, with focal lengths 5, 10, or even higher multiples of the image circle, however, such extreme lenses are not normal for large formats (unless we chose to consider astronomical telescopes as cameras, which is very valid, indeed see e.g. Schmitt cameras and astrographs)

The term telephoto has become widely if loosely used for any long-focus lens, but a true telephoto lens is designed to be physically shorter than a simple lens of that long focal length. That is, the front group is further back relative to the lens node/focal plane than would be the case for a simple thin lens of the same focal length. Typically this is achieved with a diverging group (sometimes known as the telephoto group) between the converging front group and the film/sensor. As a bonus, this rear diverging group often acts to flatten the focal plane (that would result from spherical aberrations of the front group if not corrected).

== See also ==
- List of lens designs
- Large format
