= Mamiya Press =

Line of press cameras manufactured by Mamiya

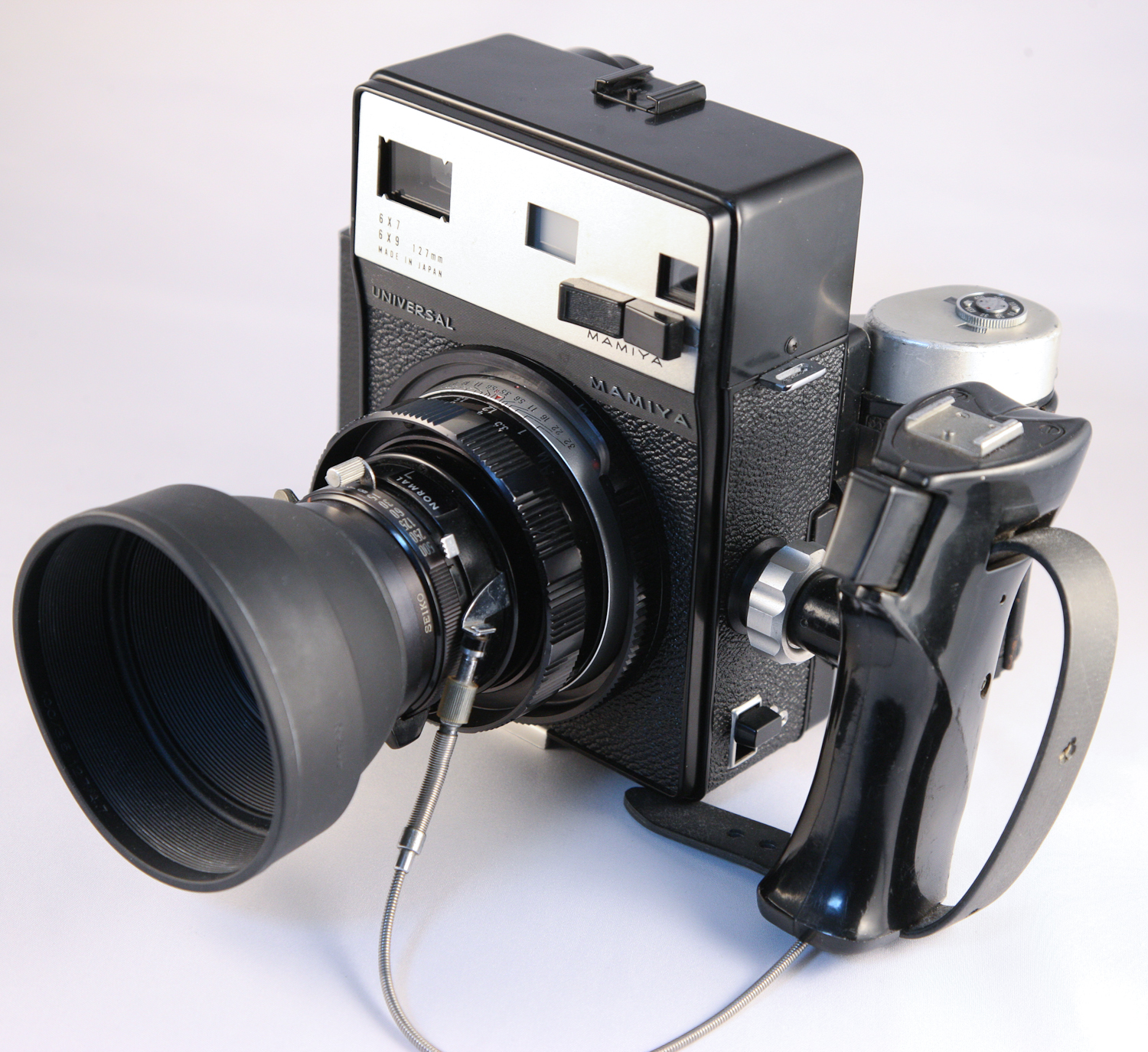
- Mamiya Universal with accessories

Overview
- Maker: Mamiya
- Type: Medium-Format Rangefinder

Lens
- Lens mount: Mamiya Press bayonet mount

Focusing
- Focus: manual

Exposure/metering
- Exposure: manual

Flash
- Flash: M or X sync from lens

Shutter
- Shutter: leaf shutter in lens

Viewfinder
- Viewfinder: parallax-corrected

General
- Dimensions: 200×160×140 mm (7.9×6.3×5.5 in)
- Weight: 1.95 kg
- Made in: Japan

The Mamiya Press is a line of medium-format rangefinder system press cameras manufactured by Mamiya. The first model was introduced in 1960, and the final model was discontinued in 1991. It was targeted at the professional press photography market, and a wide array of accessories was offered.

== Overview ==
=== Back system ===
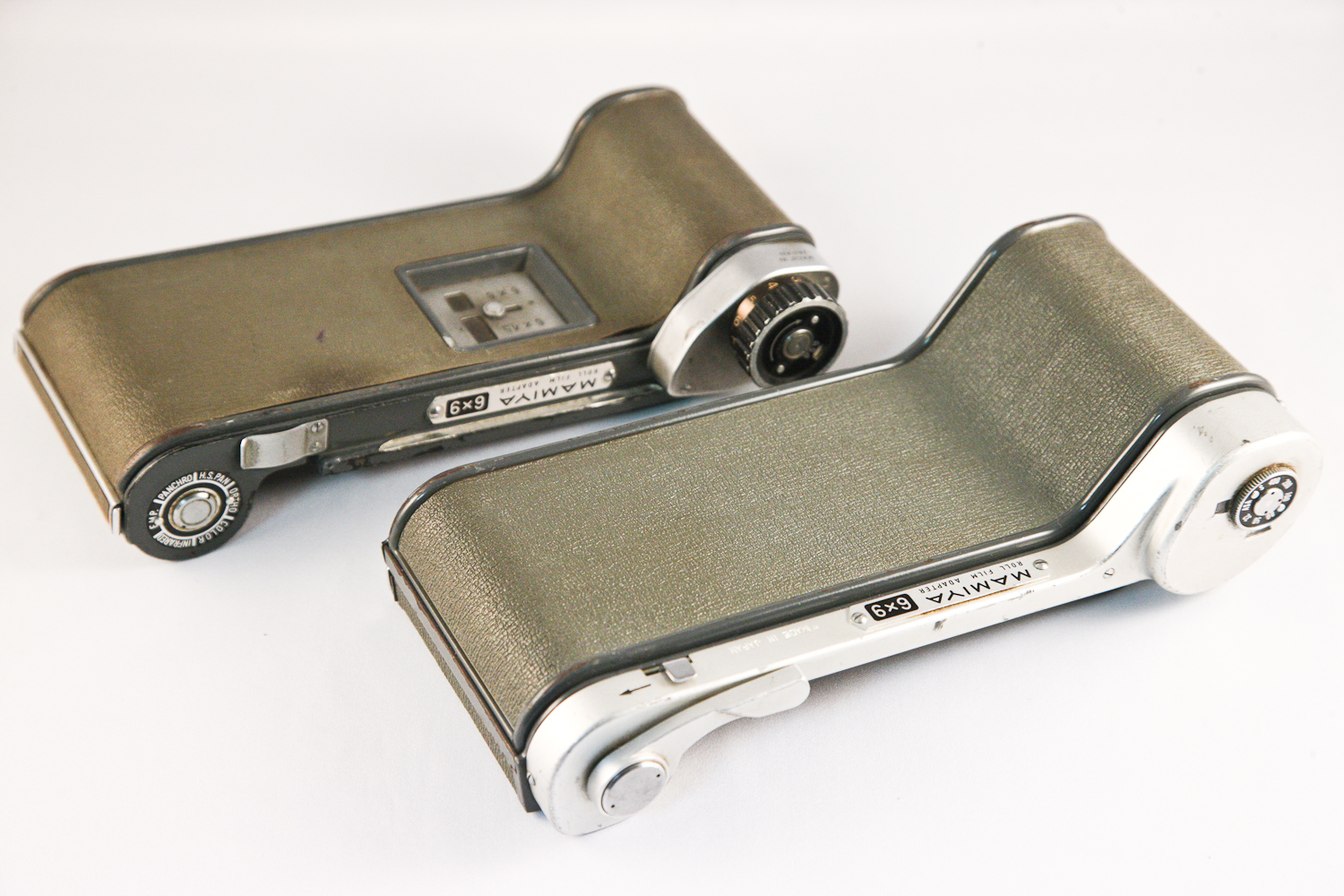
Original (grey leather) 6×9 rollfilm backs for M-type

The maximum image size that can be captured is 6 cm × 9 cm using 120 or 220 rollfilm, but images can be taken in a number of different formats, and using several types of film. Models prior to the Universal came with either a M-type or G-type back interface. M-type backs were compatible with rollfilm (120/220). G-type backs included Mamiya RB rollfilm backs and backs using the Graflok system. With Polaroid pack film, the maximum image size is 73 mm × 95 mm (2 7/8 in × 3 3/4 in), although only the 75 and 127 mm lenses will cover the larger size.

The camera lacks an internal dark slide, so one has to be inserted into the film holder before changing the lens. There were several roll-film holders for the M-type back interface:

- Model A (60605) was designed for 6×9 (2 1/4 × 3 1/4 inch) and could take eight exposures on 120 or sixteen on 220 by reversing the pressure plate. An updated version (60603) was colored black and dropped the masks for 6×6 and 645 frame sizes.
- Model B (60606) was designed for 6×7 (2 1/4 × 2 3/4 inch) and could take ten exposures on 120 or twenty on 220. An updated version (60604) was colored black and dropped the masks for 6×6 and 645 frame sizes.
- Model K was designed for 6×9, but could be masked to take 12 6×6 or 16 645 (1 5/8 × 2 1/4 inch) exposures on 120 film only, as the pressure plate could not be switched for 220.

In addition, for the M-type back interface, Mamiya made a Focusing Screen Holder (00000) and Ground Glass Back (60775) which accepted a Cut Film Holder (Type J, for 6.5×9 cm sheet film; or Type A (60610), for 2 1/4 × 3 1/4 inch sheet film) and provided a ground glass screen for focusing. A Film Pack Adapter (60611) also was available for 520 film packs.

=== Viewfinder ===
The original line of Press cameras (1960–66) were equipped with a reverse Galilean viewfinder that had a magnification of 0.66× and an effective rangefinder baseline length of 60 mm (2.4 in). The upgraded rangefinder introduced with the Super 23 (1967) and Universal (1969) models had a magnification of 0.72× with a slightly increased effective baseline length of 61.2 mm (2.41 in). In addition, the upgraded rangefinder had switchable brightline frames corresponding to the 100, 150, and 250 mm lenses, which automatically corrected for parallax.

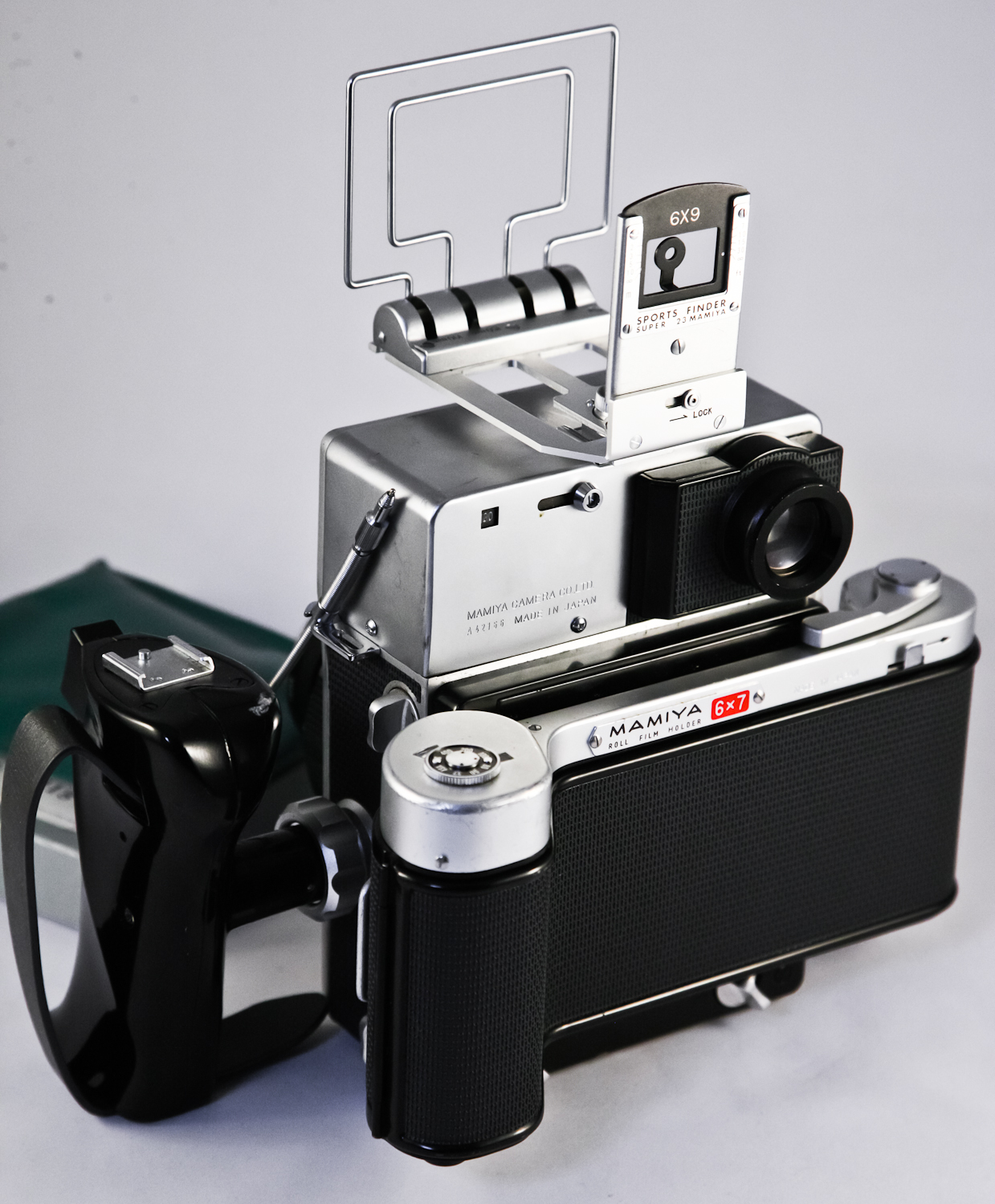
Super 23 with Sports Finder

As an accessory, each wide-angle lens was supplied with a supplementary viewfinder that attached to the accessory shoe on top of the camera. In addition, an external wire-frame Sports Finder was available as an accessory.

=== Focusing ===
Several focusing aids were available, including the Focusing Hood (for the M-type back interface), Focusing Hood Model P (for the "native" Polaroid back interface on the Universal), and right-angle and magnifying focusing backs (for the G-type back interface).

== Models ==
Mamiya Press cameras
| Name | Intro. | Back | | | Rear bellows |
| Name | Intro. | M | G | P | Rear bellows |
|---|---|---|---|---|---|
| Press (Deluxe) | 1960 (62) | Yes | No | No | Yes |
| Press G | 1963 | No | Yes | No | Yes |
| Press S | 1964 | Yes | No | No | No |
| 23 Deluxe | 1965 | Yes | No | No | Yes |
| 23 Standard | 1965 | Yes | No | No | No |
| Super 23 | 1967 | Yes | No | No | Yes |
| Universal | 1969 | Yes | Yes | Yes | No |

=== Generation 1 ===
==== Mamiya Press (Deluxe) ====
The original Mamiya Press was introduced in September 1960 with the M-type (Mamiya) back attachment system. It came with a 90 mm lens and has a bellows mechanism on the back that allows up to 15 degrees of tilt and 31 mm of extension. The camera was launched as the Mamiya Press Deluxe for the United States market in 1962.

==== Mamiya Press G ====
The Press G, introduced in November 1963, is identical to the original except for the G-type (Graflok) back attachment system, which is compatible with the same interface used by Graflex Speed Graphic cameras. Externally, the Press G can be distinguished by the color of the leather covering, which is black to match the Graflex accessories. The Press (Deluxe) is trimmed in grey leather instead.

==== Mamiya Press S ====
The Press S is a simplified version of the original camera, introduced in June 1964. It features a fixed Mamiya Color Sekor 105 mm f/3.5 lens with four elements in three groups and does not have a rear bellows, but accepts the same rollfilm backs as the Press using a M-type interface.

=== Generation 1.5 ===
==== Mamiya 23 Deluxe ====
The original Press (Deluxe) was renamed to the Mamiya 23 Deluxe in 1965. The updated name reflected the camera's added ability to use 2×3 inch sheet film or 12-sheet "520" film packs with the ground glass holder, as an alternative to the standard rollfilm backs, via the M-type back attachment system.

==== Mamiya 23 Standard ====
A simplified version, omitting the rear bellows, was introduced in July 1965 and named the 23 Standard; the 23 Standard upgraded the Press S by adding the same interchangeable lens mount as the rest of the line. Externally, the top cover of the Standard has a satin chrome finish (instead of grey paint) and the body is colored black; the name is printed on the front of the camera near the rangefinder window. After the Super 23 was released, replacing the 23 Deluxe, the 23 Standard was renamed to the Standard 23.

=== Generation 2 ===
==== Mamiya Super 23 ====
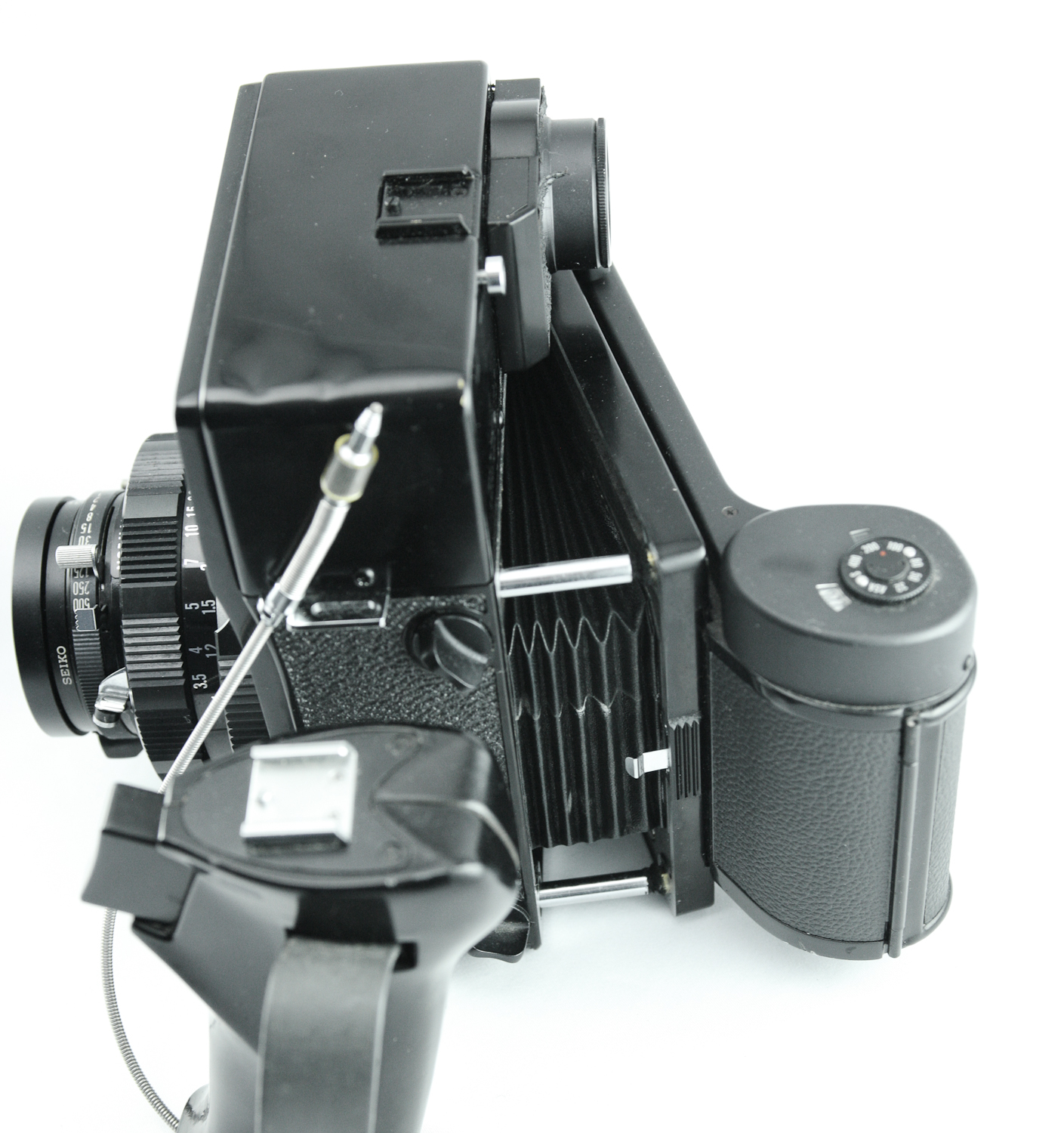
Super 23 with rear bellows performing swing movement

Introduced in August 1967, the Super 23 was the first major revision in the series. The body was redesigned, but still retains the rear bellows system. The much larger viewfinder includes selectable bright lines for the 100 mm, 150 mm, and 250 mm lenses for the first time. The black-finished version of the Super 23 was introduced in October 1969. The 100 mm lens became standard. M-Back adapter integrated like in the other earlier versions.

==== Mamiya Universal ====
The final model was introduced in April 1969 and was produced until 1991; it was an update of the Standard 23, also omitting the rear bellows but equipped with the same viewfinder as the Super 23. Like the Super 23, it was introduced initially with a chrome finish and a black-finished version followed in August 1971.

As the Universal name indicates, it is compatible with both M-type and G-type back interfaces when properly equipped. The "native" interface accepted a Polaroid back (60780) or a focusing back (60781) directly on the camera, and adapters were available for M-type (Mamiya, 60778) and G-type (Graflok, 60779) interfaces.

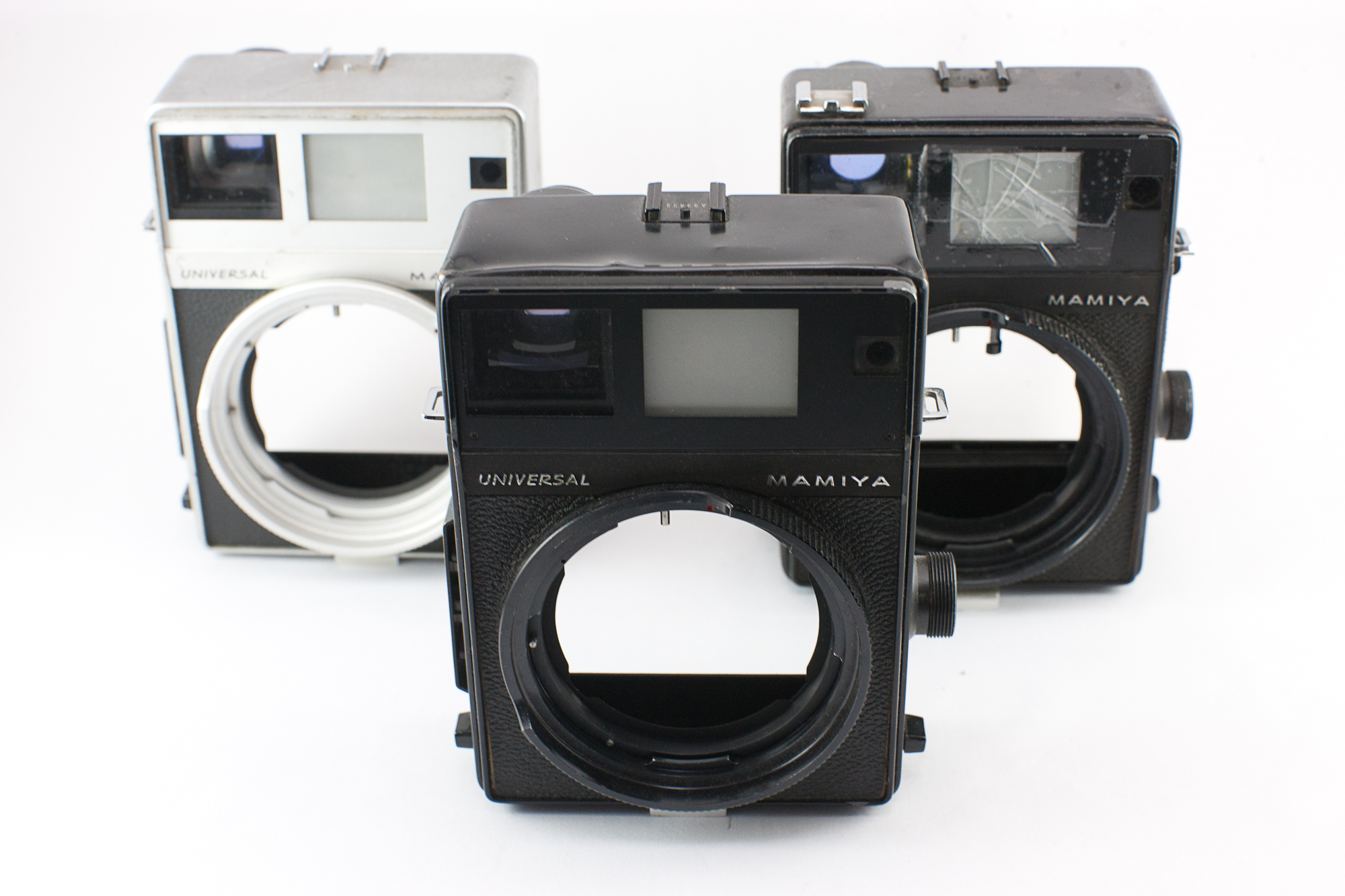
Universal bodies

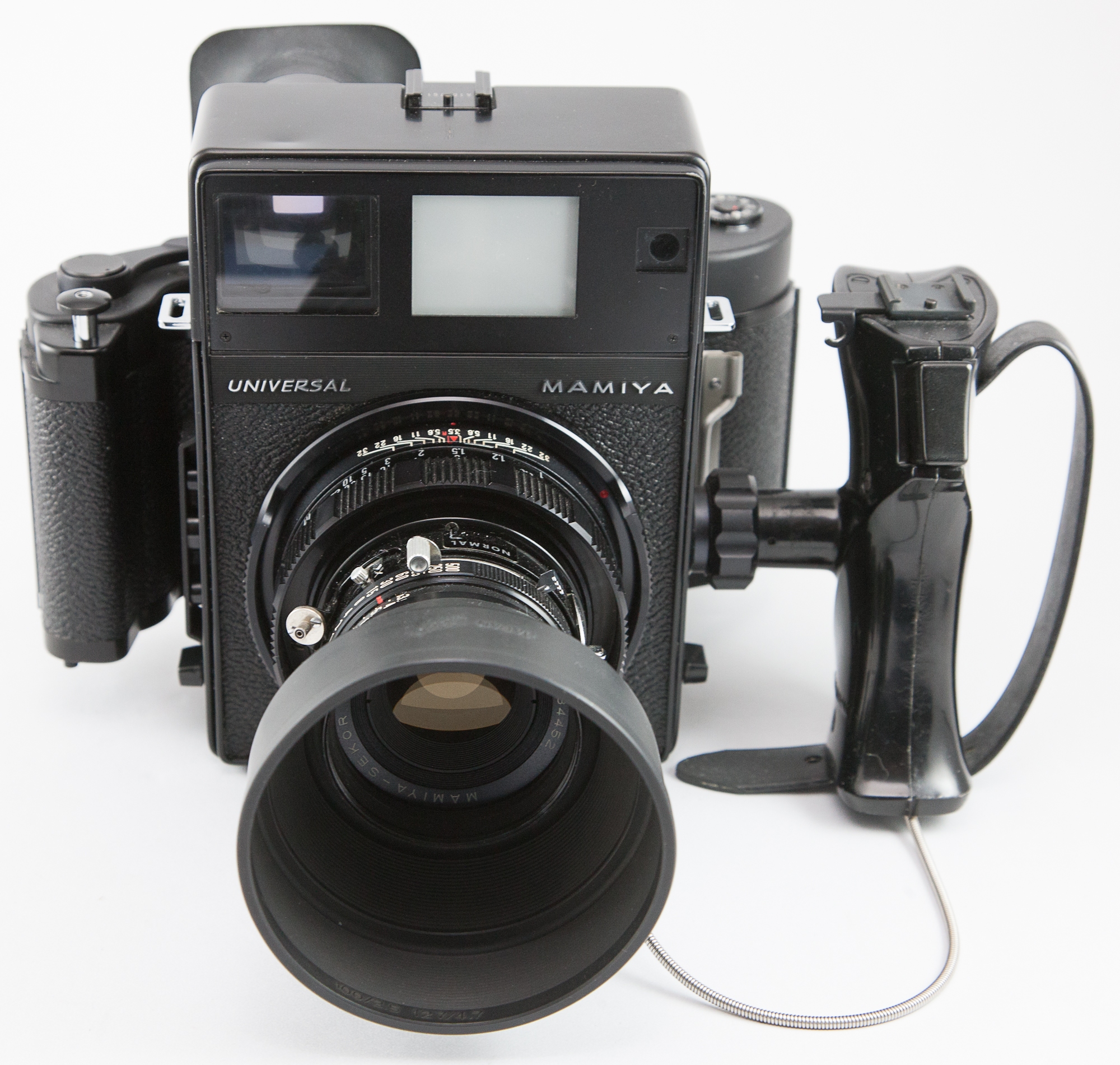
Universal with 100mm f/3.5 lens, hood, and 6×7 rollfilm back

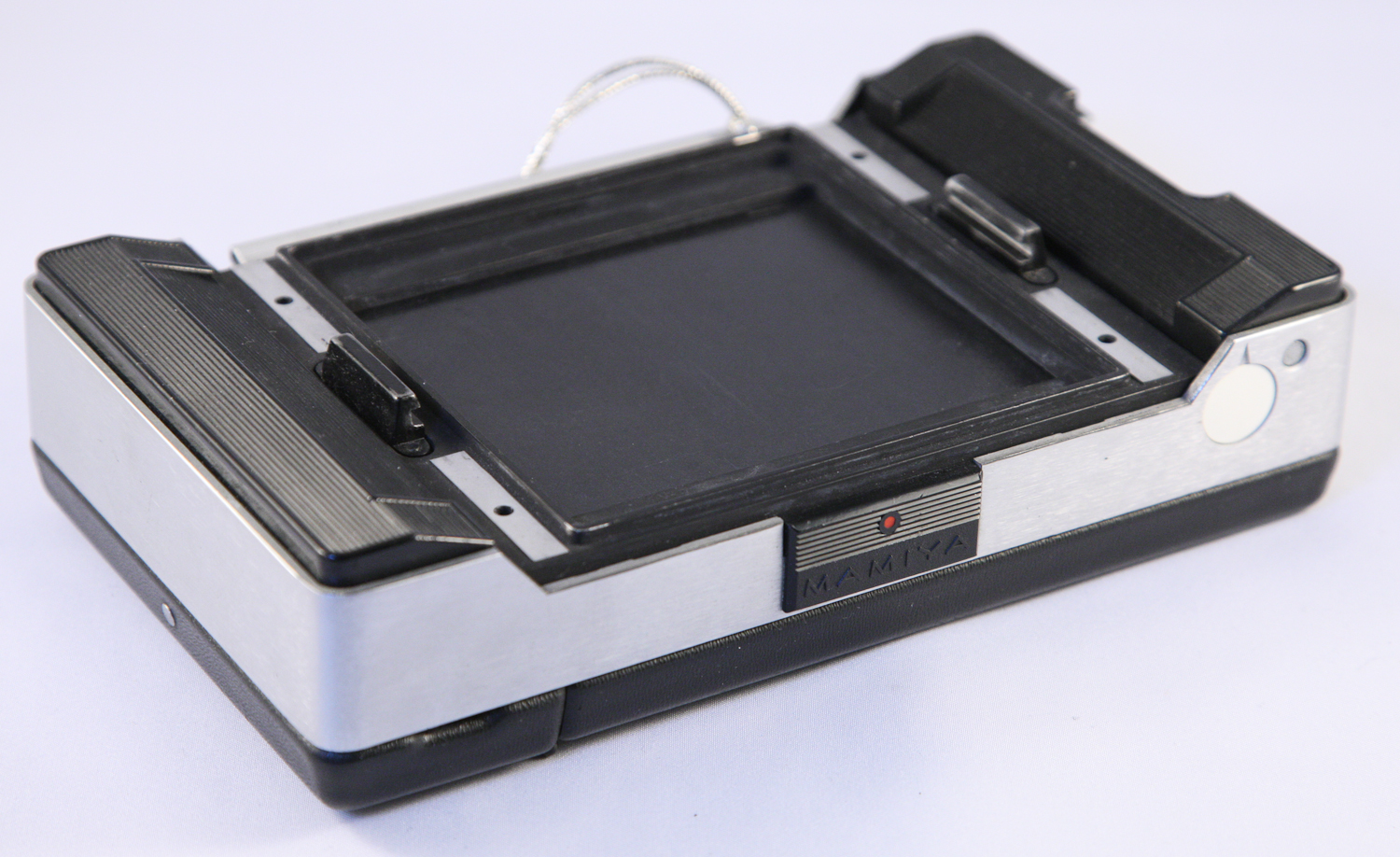
Universal Polaroid back (type 1)

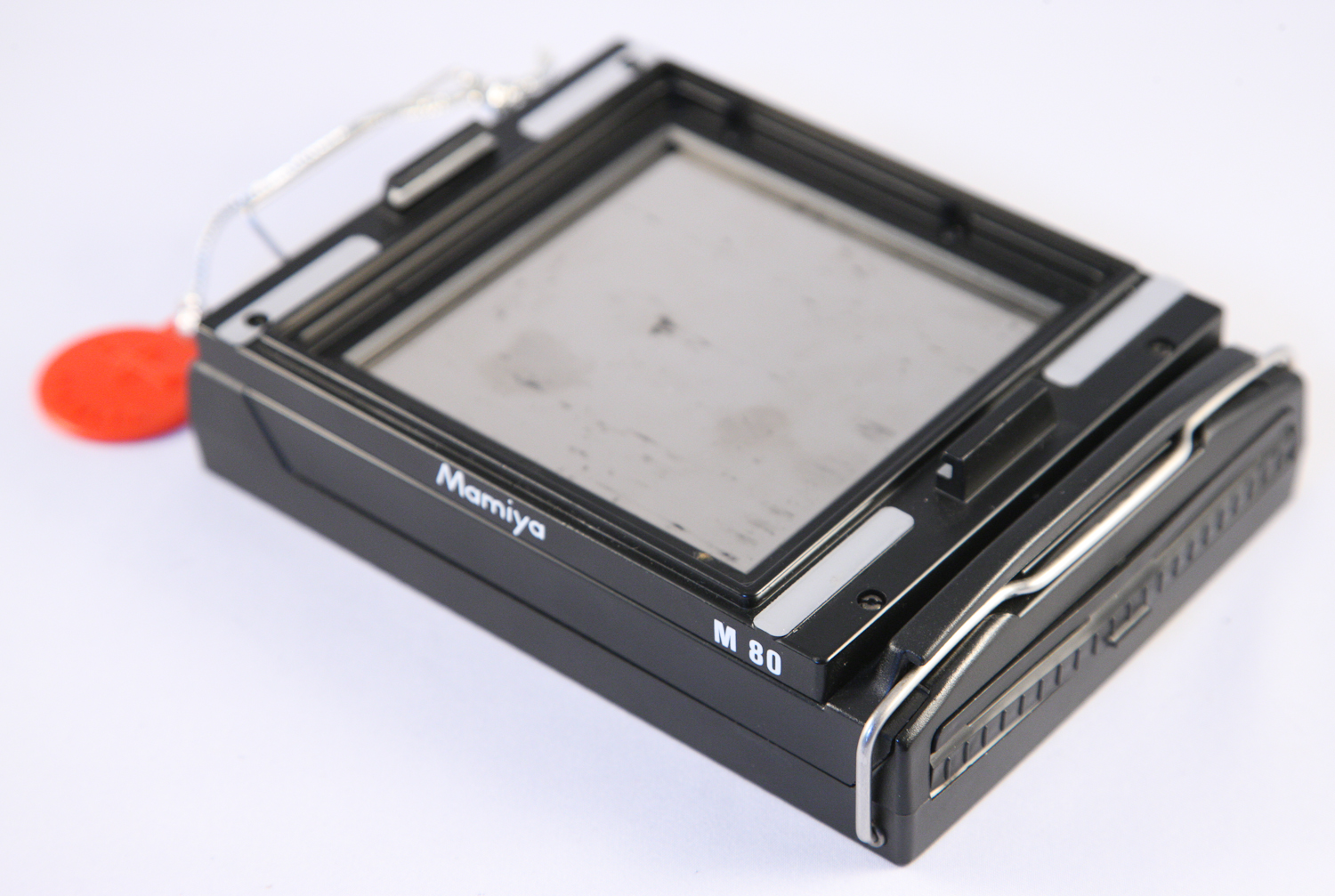
Universal Polaroid back (type 2)

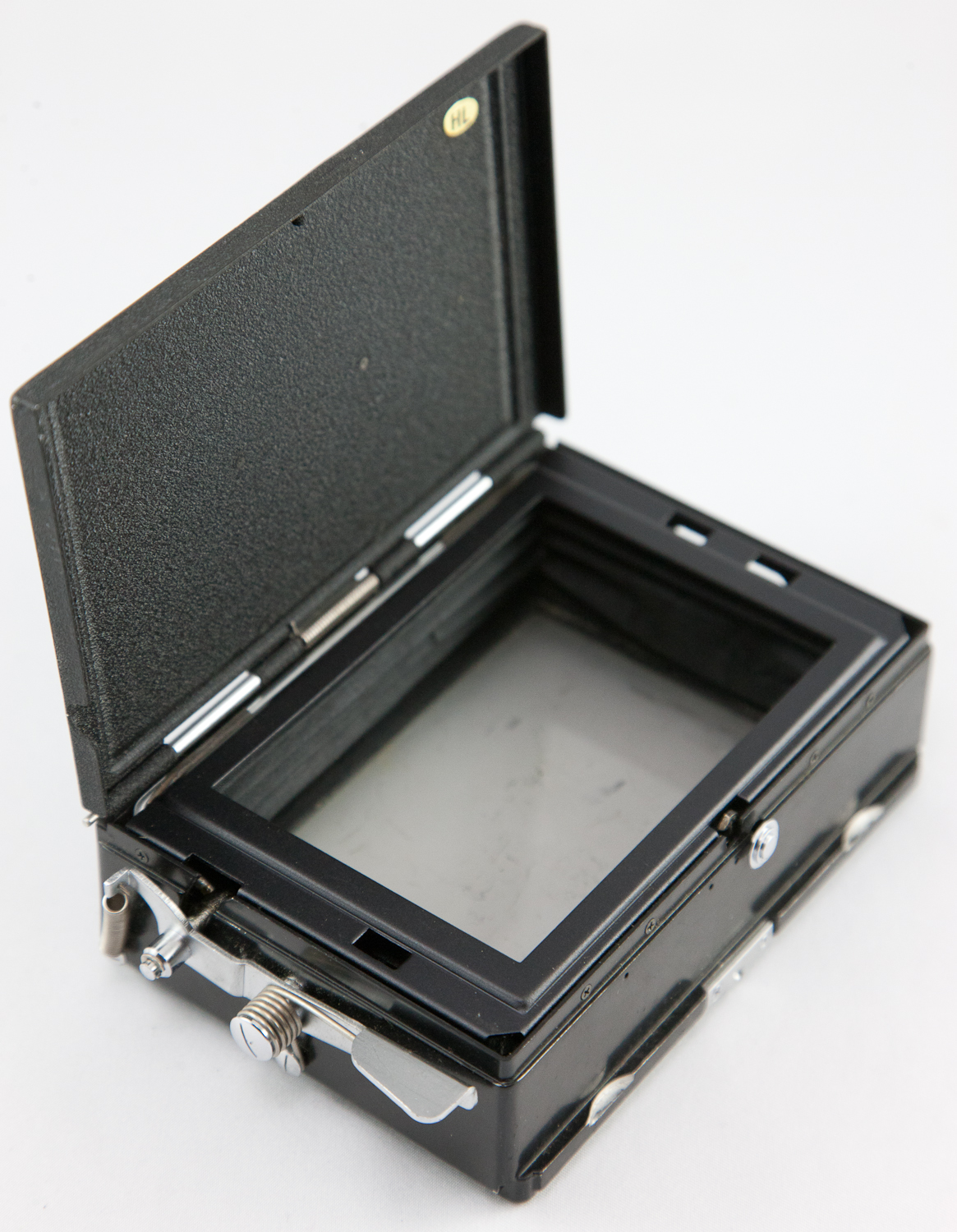
Ground glass focusing screen and hood for M-type

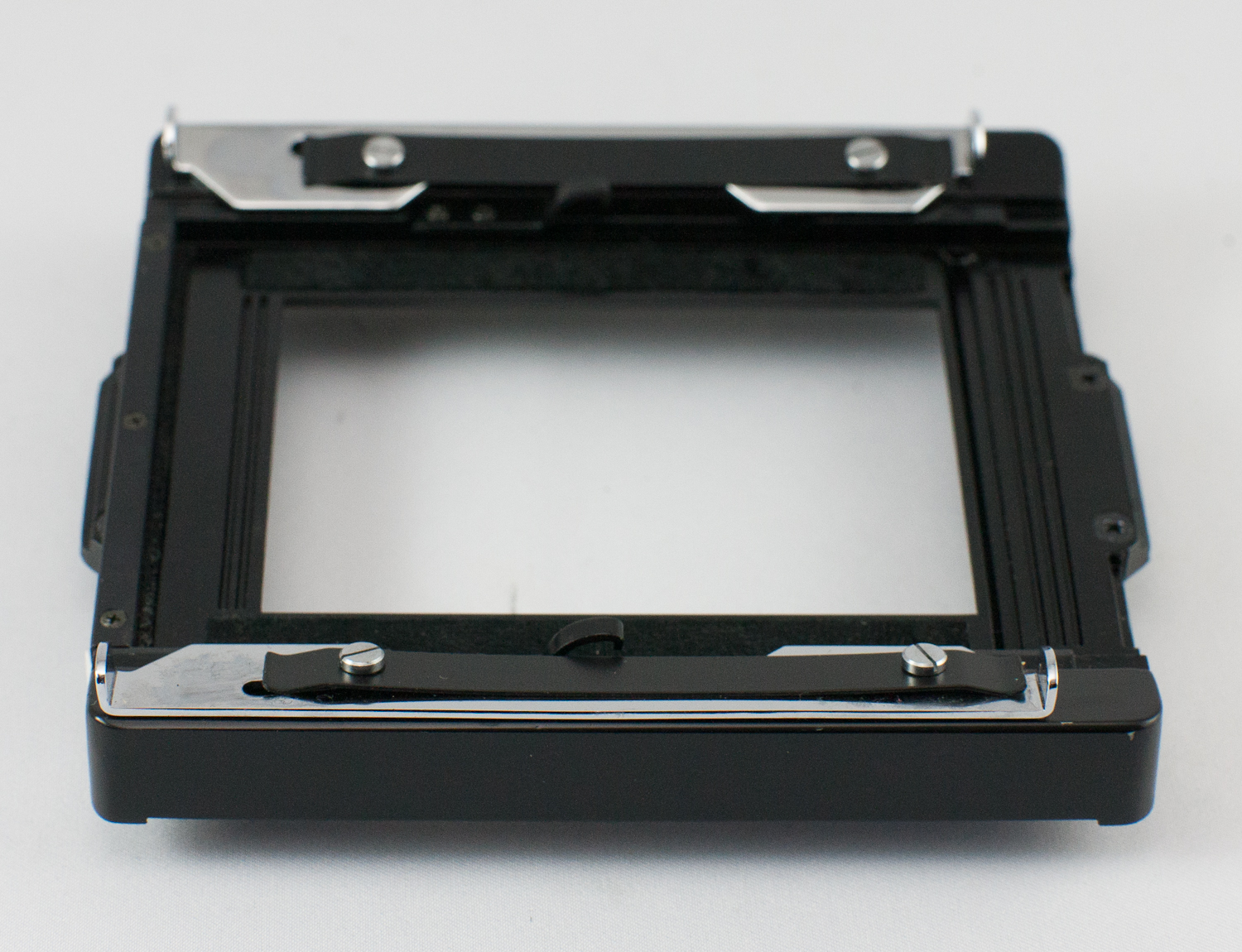
G-type adapter for Universal

=== Polaroid 600 & 600 SE ===
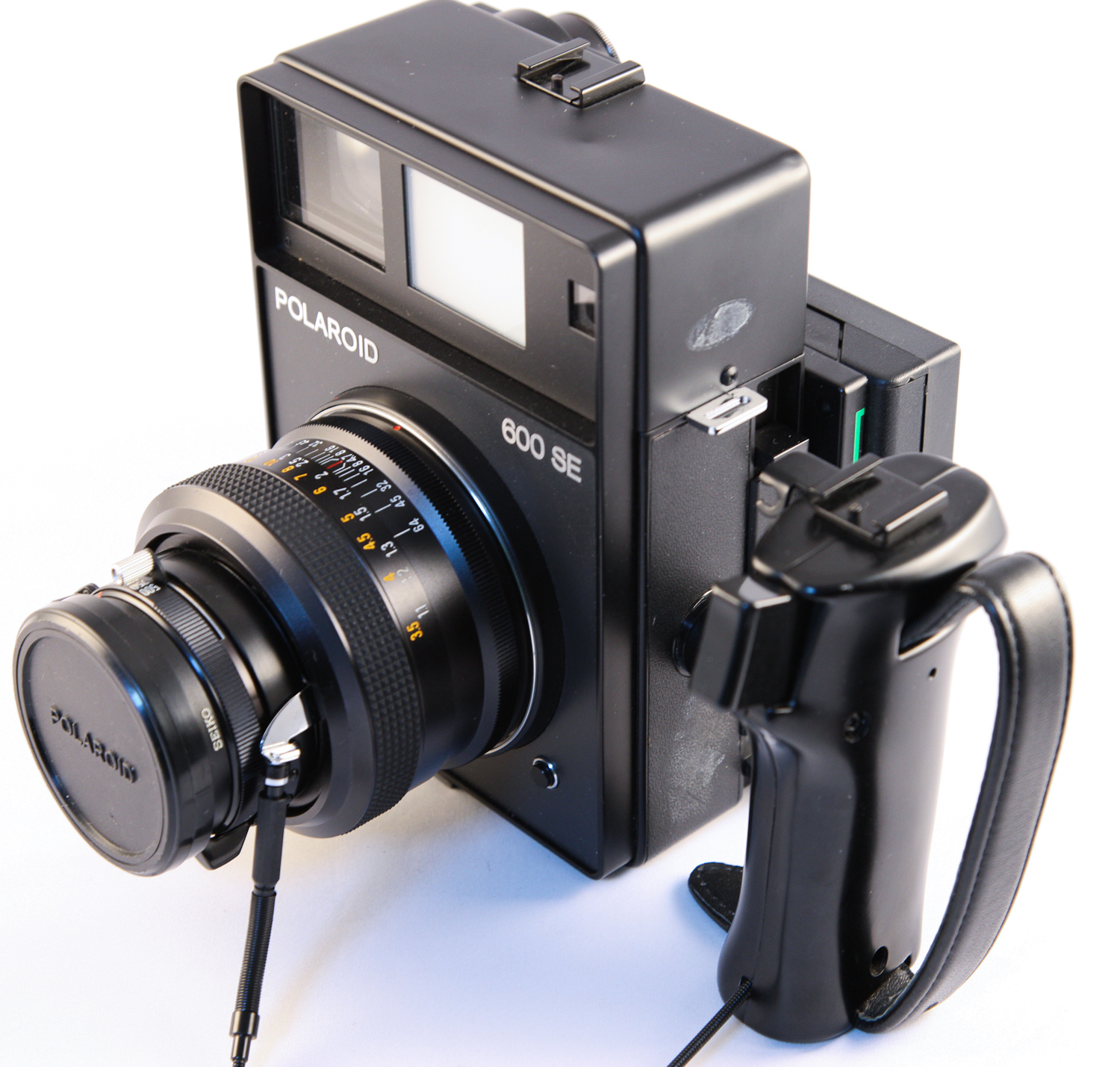
Polaroid 600 SE with 127 mm lens

The Polaroid 600 and 600 SE are built by Mamiya, sharing their basic design with the Mamiya Universal but with physically incompatible back and lens mounts. The 600/SE are limited to using Polaroid Type 100 pack film through a removable back that is not compatible with the Mamiya P-type interface on the Universal. Whereas the 600 is a fixed-lens camera, equipped with the Mamiya 127 mm lens, the 600 SE is fitted with an interchangeable lens mount similar to the Mamiya Press line; however, only three lenses were made (75 mm, 127 mm, and 150 mm, sharing their optical design with their Mamiya Press counterparts) that cover the full Polaroid Type 100 frame size of 83 mm × 103 mm (3 1/4 in × 4 in).

Both backs and lenses are mutually, deliberately incompatible between the Polaroid 600 and Mamiya Press systems to preserve their respective markets; however, an adapter was made later that allows the use of M-type rollfilm backs on the Polaroid 600.

== Lenses ==
All of the lenses have leaf shutters, which are released on the lens itself, not through the body as is typical with most cameras. The shutter is typically triggered from one of several models of removable grips, all of which have a built-in release cable. The lenses also have flash PC terminals compatible with M (flashbulb) or X (electronic flash) synchronization.

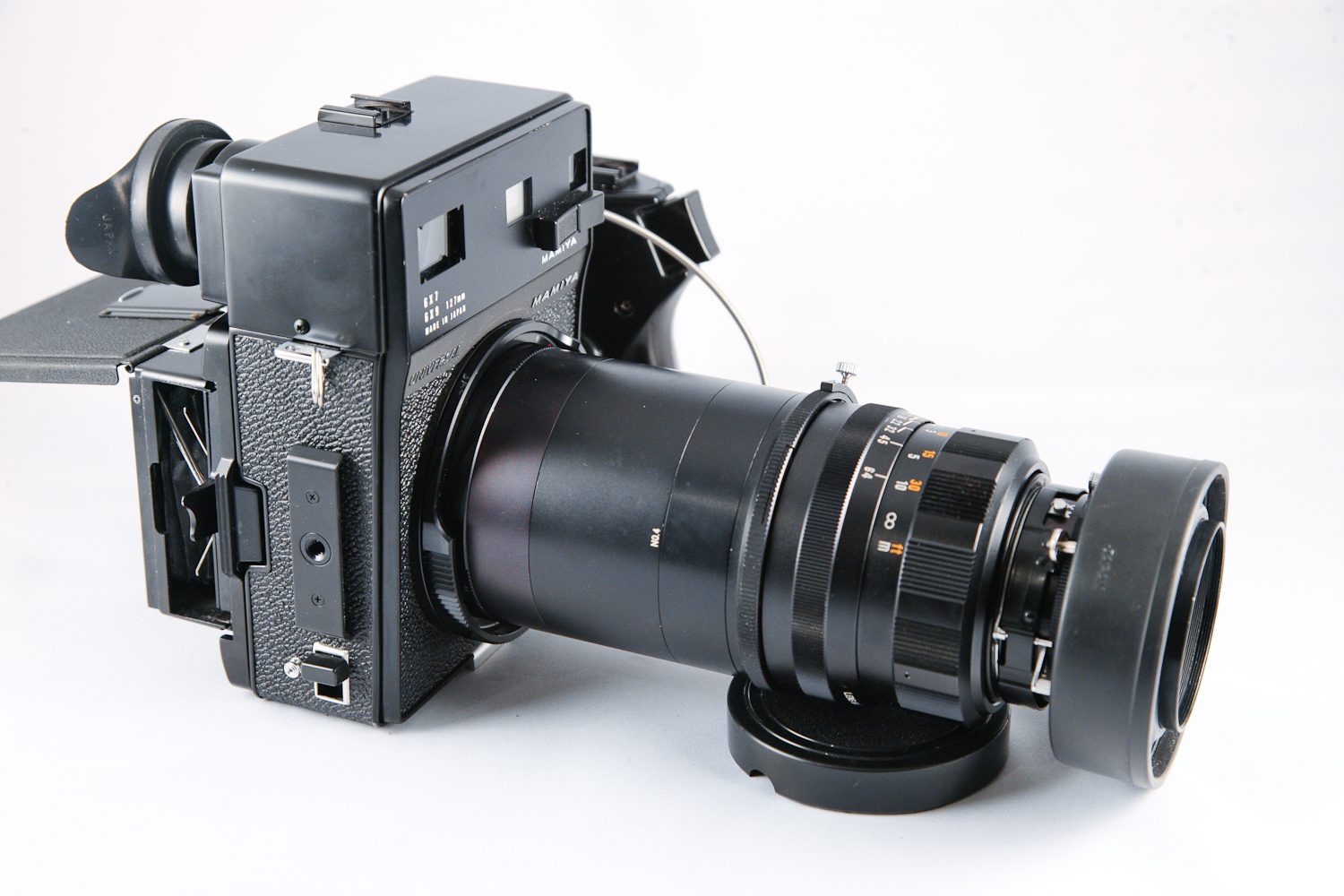
Mamiya Universal with extension ring set

A set of five extension rings (60650) is available for close-up work. In addition, there is a set of two spacers (60453) available for the Universal that extend the back away from the body, equivalent to the close-up capability enabled by the rear bellows on the Super 23.

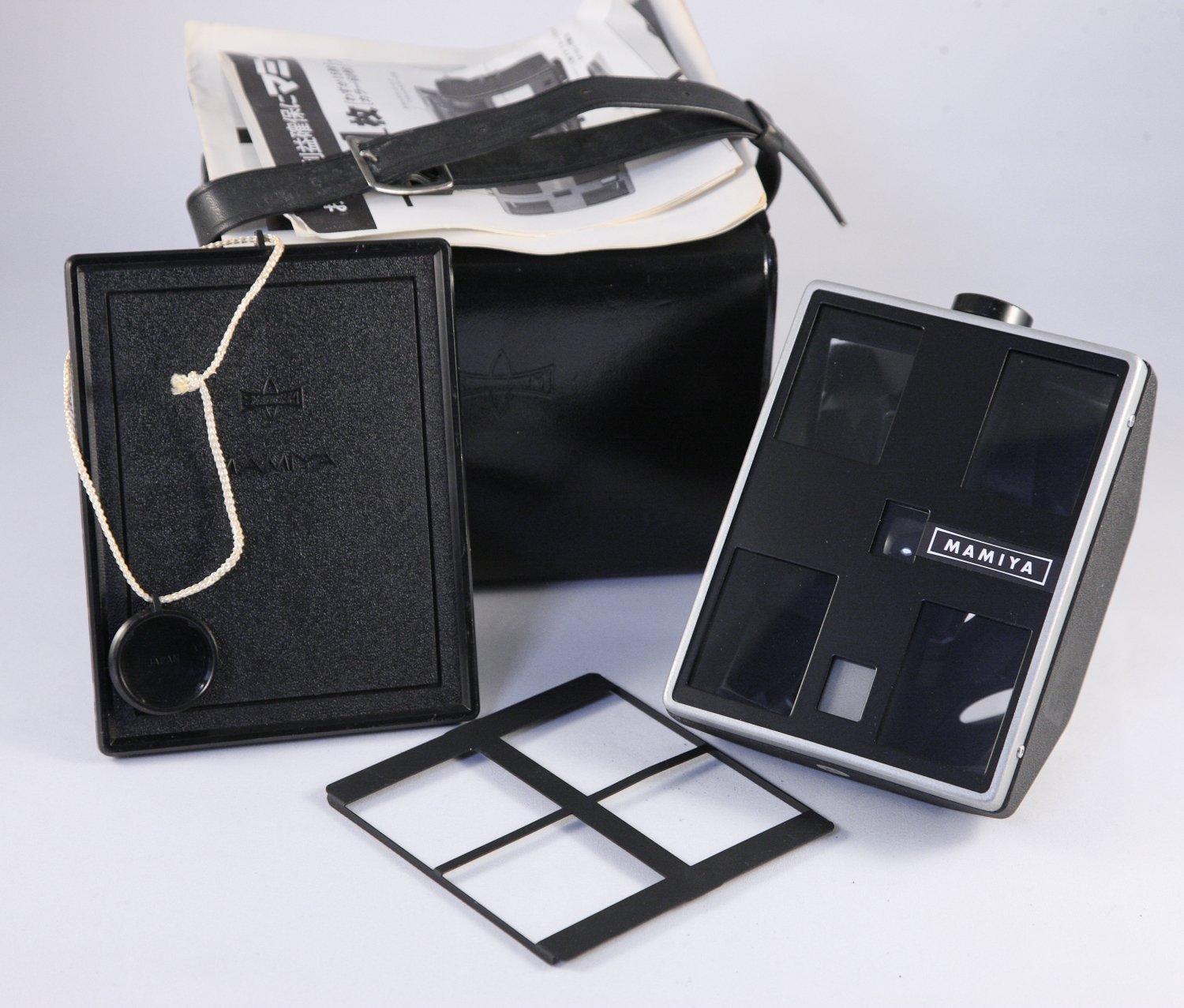
Tetraphoto adapter for Mamiya Universal

On the Universal, a Tetraphoto (four-photo) or Duophoto (two-photo) adapter can be added to the front of the lens to capture multiple images simultaneously on Polaroid film.

Mamiya-Sekor lenses for Mamiya Press cameras
| Focal length | Aperture | Image | Construction | | Angle of view | | | Min. focus | Filter size | Weight | Notes |
| Focal length | Aperture | Image | Ele. | Grp. | 6×7 | 6×9 | Pola. (Note: When listed, this lens covers Polaroid Type 100 and Fuji FP-100C Instant film) | Min. focus | Filter size | Weight | Notes |
|---|---|---|---|---|---|---|---|---|---|---|---|
| 50 mm | f/6.3–32 | | 8 | 5 | 82° | 89.5° | — | 3.3 ft (1.0 m) | 72 mm | 610 g (22 oz) | Biogon-type, requires external viewfinder |
| 65 mm | f/6.3–32 | | 4 | 4 | 68°12' | 75°30' | — | 3.5 ft (1.1 m) | 43 mm | 350 g (12 oz) | Topogon-type, requires external viewfinder |
| 75 mm | f/5.6–45 | | 7 | 4 | 61° | 68° | 77° | 3.5 ft (1.1 m) | 72 mm | 650 g (23 oz) | Super Angulon-type, requires external viewfinder |
| 90 mm | f/3.5–45 | | 4 | 3 | 51°50' | 58°30' | — | 3.3 ft (1.0 m) | 40.5 mm | | Tessar-type, standard lens for earlier cameras |
| 100 mm | f/3.5–32 | | 4 | 3 | 47°36' | 53°36' | — | 3.5 ft (1.1 m) | 55 mm (Note: Earlier (chrome-finished) lenses used a 40.5mm attachment size.) | 480 g (17 oz) | Tessar-type |
| 100 mm | f/2.8–32 | | 6 | 4 | 47°36' | 53°36' | — | 3.5 ft (1.1 m) | 72 mm | 700 g (25 oz) | Planar (double Gauss)-type |
| 127 mm | f/4.7–64 | | 4 | 3 | 38°40' | 43°30' | 50°50' | 5 ft (1.5 m) | 55 mm | 470 g (17 oz) | Tessar-type |
| 150 mm | f/5.6–45 | | 4 | 3 | 38°40' | 37°12' | — | 7 ft (2.1 m) | 55 mm | 530 g (19 oz) | Tele-Tessar-type |
| 250 mm | f/8.0–64 | | 6 | 4 | 20°10' | 22°50' | — | 12 ft (3.7 m) | 55 mm | | Sonnar-type, not coupled with rangefinder |
| 250 mm | f/5.0–45 | | 6 | 4 | 20°10' | 22°50' | — | 8 ft (2.4 m) | 105 mm | 1,825 g (64.4 oz) | Sonnar-type, only for Universal and Super 23 |

== See also ==
- List of Mamiya products
