= Minolta W Rokkor 21mm lenses =

Still-photography camera lens

Minolta W Rokkor 21mm
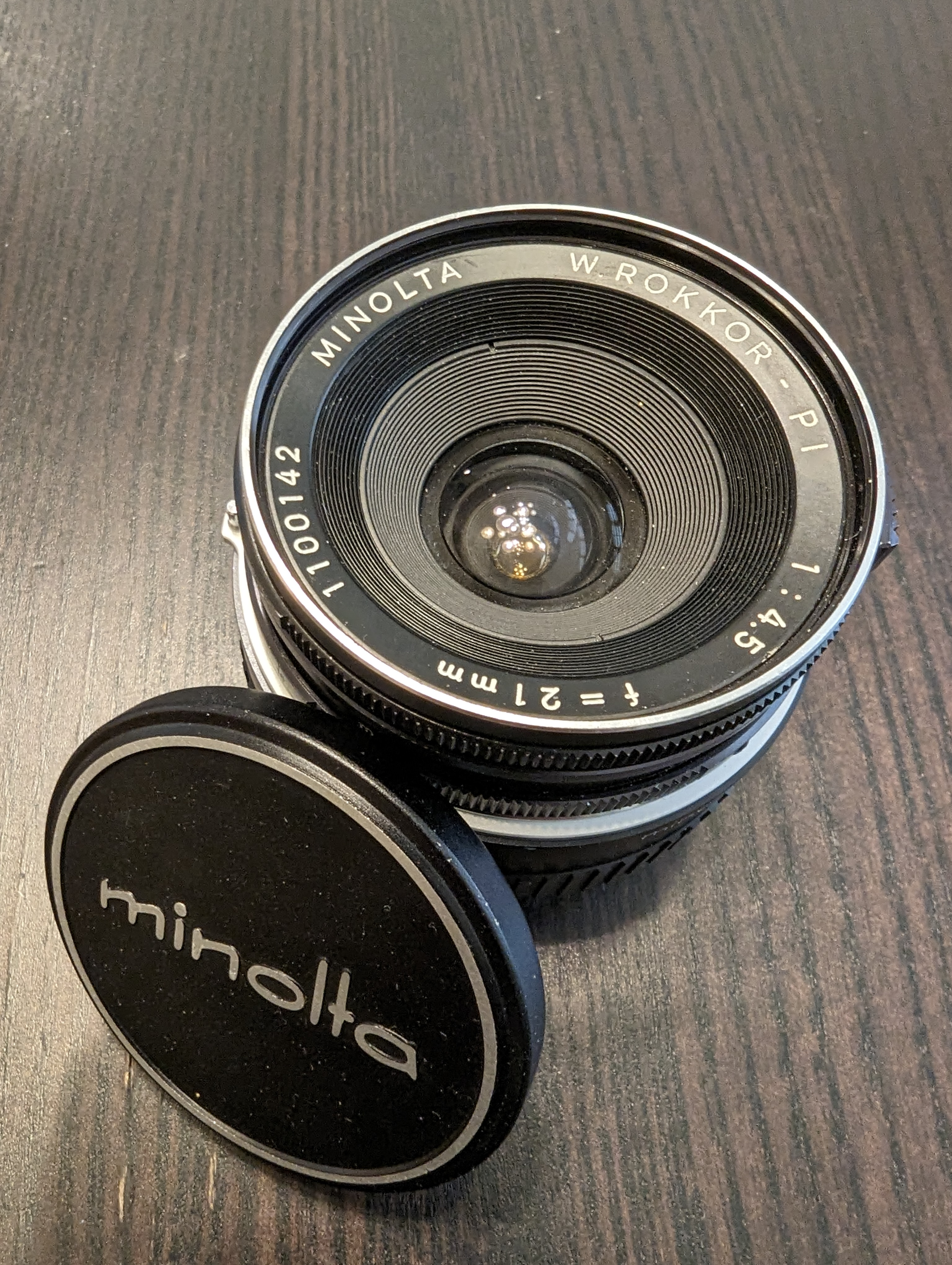
- First (1962) version, W Rokkor-PI
- Maker: Minolta

Technical data
- Focal length: 21mm

Features
- Ultrasonic motor: No No
- Macro capable: No No

Physical
- Filter diameter: Integrated

Accessories
- Lens hood: Integrated Flower

Angle of view
- Diagonal: 92°

History
- Introduction: 1962
- Discontinuation: 1977
- Successor: W Rokkor 20mm f/2.8

The W Rokkor 21mm lenses are a series of three prime wide angle lenses produced by Minolta for Minolta SR-mount single lens reflex cameras. The first 21mm lens released was the W Rokkor-PI 21mm f/4.5 (1962), which featured a symmetrical design similar to the contemporary Zeiss Biogon. This was succeeded by the W Rokkor-QH 21mm f/4 (1963), with slightly improved speed and similar symmetric construction. The third and final 21mm lens was the MC W Rokkor-NL 21mm f/2.8 (1971), which featured a retrofocus design that did not require the reflex mirror to be locked up, allowing use of the built-in viewfinder.

== Design and history ==
Minolta updated the design several times during the course of production; the first two versions were symmetric designs which required the reflex mirror to be locked up, while the third version was a retrofocus design, followed by a cosmetic update in 1973.

When the Rokkor-PI f/4.5 was introduced, it was advertised as "a product of much painstaking work and research by the company's technical staff", which Erhard Bertele called "a mockery" in retrospect, declaring it "[an imitation of the Biogon] with seemingly insignificant small changes to the original Bertele design". The similarities in lens design between the Biogon and the Rokkor-PI f/4.5 have led to speculation the latter was discontinued in favor of the Rokkor-QH f/4 in response, as the -QH shares a similar 8-element, 4-group design as the Nikkor-O 2.1 cm f/4 (1959). In 1964, the suggested retail price of the Rokkor-PI f/4.5, with accessory viewfinder and leather case, was US$209.50 (equivalent to $2,120 in 2024). By 1968, the successor Rokkor-QH f/4 retailed at a lower price, US$159.50 (equivalent to $1,440 in 2024), with a dealer cost of US$95.70 (equivalent to $870 in 2024).

The Rokkor-NL f/2.8, introduced in 1971, has three floating elements to compensate for focusing aberrations at close range. It was replaced by the MD Rokkor 20mm f/2.8 lens (1977), which was more compact and lighter.

Minolta 21mm wide angle lenses for SR-mount
| Model Spec | | W Rokkor-PI 21mm f/4.5 | W Rokkor-QH 21mm f/4.0 | MC W Rokkor NL 21mm f/2.8 | MC W Rokkor(-X) NL 21mm f/2.8 |
|---|---|---|---|---|---|
| Year | | 1962 | 1963 | 1971 | 1973 |
| Construction | Elements | 9 | 8 | 12 | |
| Construction | Groups | 5 | 4 | 9 | |
| Aperture | | f/4.5–16 | f/4.0–16 | f/2.8–16 | |
| Min. focus | | 0.9 m (35.4 in) | | 0.25 m (9.8 in) | |
| Metering features | Meter coupling (MC) tab | No | No | Yes | Yes |
| Metering features | Minimum diaphragm (MD) tab | No | No | No | No |
| Metering features | Aperture lock | No | No | No | No |
| Dimensions | Diam. | 60 mm (2.4 in) | | 75 mm (3.0 in) | |
| Dimensions | Length | 20 mm (0.8 in) | | 67 mm (2.6 in) | |
| Dimensions | Weight | 170 g (6.0 oz) | 166 g (5.9 oz) | 510 g (18 oz) | |
| Dimensions | Filter (mm) | 55 | | 72 | |

== See also ==
- List of Minolta SR-mount lenses
