= Metrogon =

Wide-field photographic lens design

Metrogon (Topogon)
- Introduced in: 1933
- Author: Robert Richter
- Construction: 4 elements in 4 groups
- Aperture: 6.3

Metrogon is a high resolution, low-distortion, extra-wide field (90 degree field of view) photographic lens design, popularized by Bausch and Lomb. Variations of this design were used extensively by the US military for aerial photography, fitted to the T-11 and other aerial cameras.

== Design ==
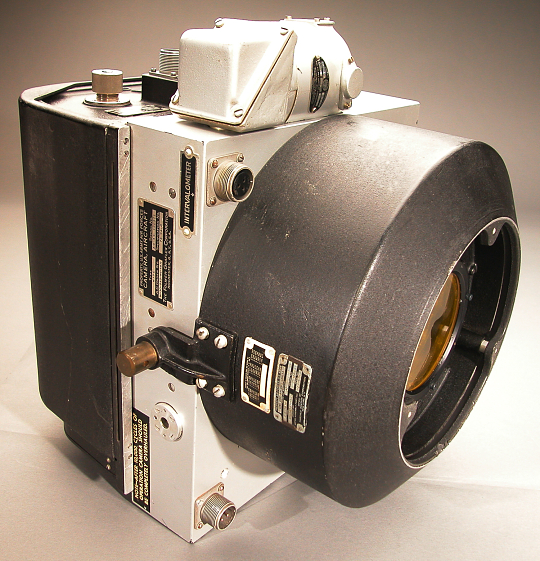
Fairchild K-17C aerial camera with Metrogon lens

The most common Metrogon lenses have a f number of 6.3 and a focal length of 6 inches. The company name (Bausch and Lomb) and the US Patent number (2031792) are prominently inscribed on the front of the lens barrel. However, this patent is for a family of symmetric wide-angle lenses designed by Robert Richter of Carl Zeiss AG, which was filed in 1934 and sold by Zeiss as the Topogon. For this reason, it is believed the Metrogon lenses marked with this patent are a licensed version of the popular and very similar (if not identical) Topogon design.

An aerial camera fitted with a Metrogon lens deployed by the United States Army Air Corps was featured in a 1941 article in Popular Science, which noted the lens gave the camera a 93° field of view, doubling the area that could be captured in a single photograph. By 1944, the military had charted 3,000,000 sq mi (7,800,000 km^{2}) in a single year using the tri-Metrogon, a triple aerial camera system fitted to the noses of aircraft including the P-38 Lightning and B-25 Mitchell.

In 1943, Bausch and Lomb was granted an independent patent for a similar lens design with 5 elements and the same f/6.3 maximum aperture, showing less distortion than the lens in the Carl Zeiss patent. The Bausch and Lomb patent also compares the distortion of their design favorably to a similar 5 element lens, patented in 1938, which has a slightly wider maximum f-number of f/5.6. It is not certain whether Bausch and Lomb incorporated their own design instead of the Zeiss design when producing Metrogon lenses after 1943.

The introduction of faster lenses with equivalent coverage including the Wild Aviotar and Zeiss Biogon in the 1950s rendered the Metrogon obsolete, and Metrogon lenses were sold to the public as surplus starting in the early 1960s.
