= Topogon =

- Introduced in: 1933
- Author: Robert Richter
- Construction: 4 elements in 4 groups
- Aperture: 6.3

Topogon is a wide field (originally 100 degrees field of view), symmetrical photographic lens patented by Robert Richter in 1933 for Carl Zeiss AG. As there are four meniscus elements in four groups, deployed symmetrically around the central aperture, it is considered a double Gauss lens variant.

== Design ==
According to Richter, the Topogon was developed from the Goerz Hypergon (1900), one of the first super-wide-angle lenses. Richter credits the mathematician Emil von Höegh, who had designed the Dagor anastigmat (1892), with designing the Hypergon for Goerz. Although the Hypergon covered a wide angle of view (140°) and had good flatness of field and distortion characteristics, the maximum aperture was limited to f/22 to control longitudinal spherical aberration and chromatic aberration. A new computation of a "fast" Hypergon was made by limiting the angle of view to 90°, which allowed an increased maximum aperture of f/6.3.

The Topogon was derived from the "fast" Hypergon by adding a second, symmetric set of strongly curved meniscus elements inside the larger spherical elements to correct longitudinal spherical aberration. The initial design patented by Richter was for a f=66mm f/6.3 lens covering 100°, although the patent also contains two other refinements to the basic design, including one that used parallel elements to minimize vignetting. As the name suggests, the Topogon was intended to be used for topographical surveys and photogrammetry.

The Topogon was later developed into the Pleon fisheye lens (1938) and Pleogon lens by Richter and Friedrich Koch in 1956. The Pleon was used for aerial surveillance during World War II, and was equipped with a large negative meniscus cemented group ahead of the Topogon core as an early example of an inverted telephoto design; a special projector was required to display an undistorted image. The Pleogon, used for photogrammetry, used a cemented achromatic lens just ahead of the central stop and added two meniscus groups on either side to maintain lens symmetry.

Topogon lenses have been produced with maximum apertures ranging from f/3.5 to f/15 in various focal lengths.

Hypergon, Topogon, and Zeiss development

Goerz Hypergon by von Höegh (1900), from US 706,650

Zeiss Topogon by Richter (1933), from US 2,031,792

Zeiss Pleon by Richter (1938), from US 2,247,068

Zeiss Pleogon by Richter & Koch (1956), from DE 1,097,710

== Influence ==
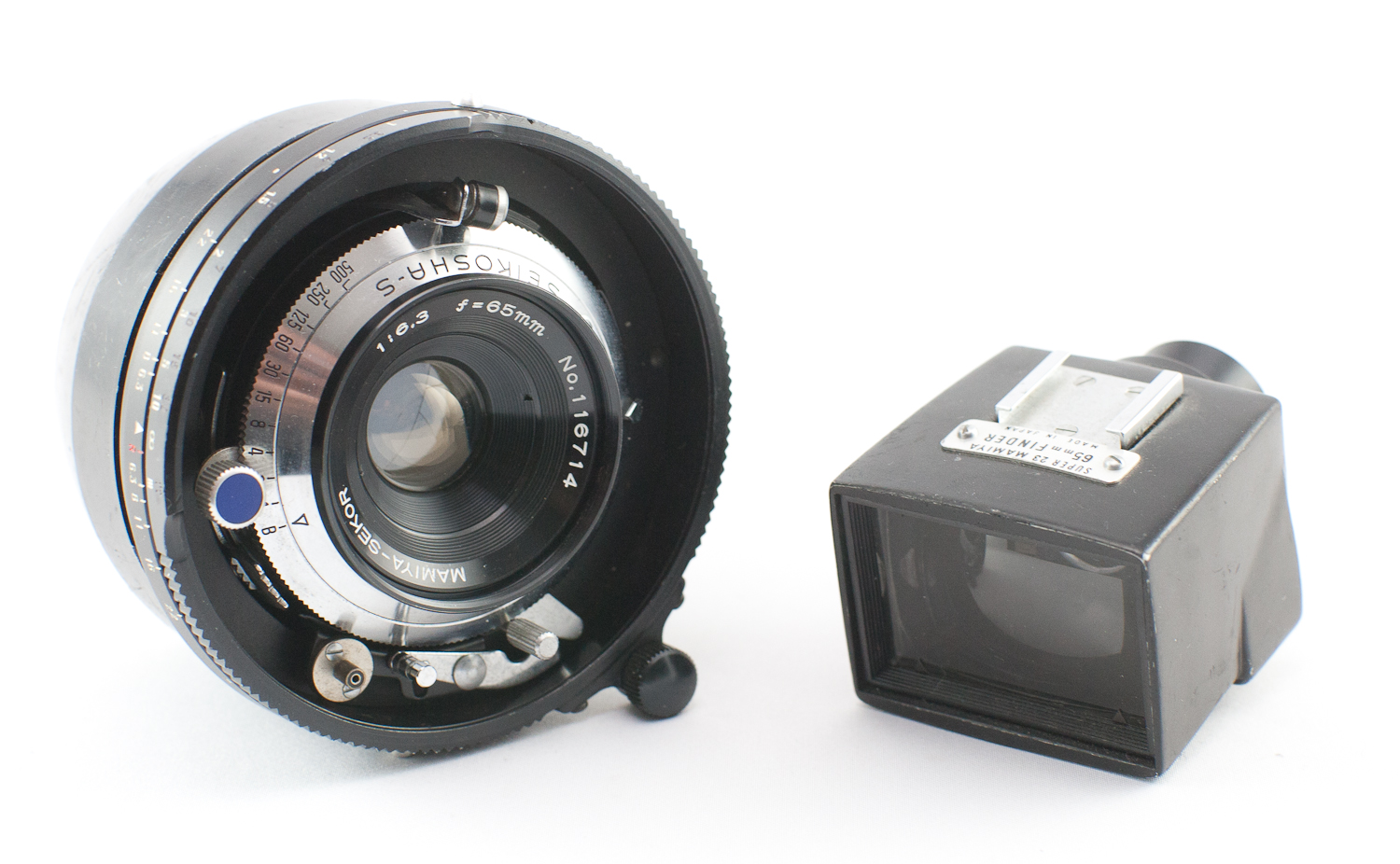
Topogon-design lens and auxiliary viewfinder for the Mamiya Press line of cameras

Goerz was merged into the Zeiss Ikon company in 1926. An independent branch of Goerz in America, which had been established in 1895, licensed the Topogon design to Bausch & Lomb, who produced it as the Metrogon for the United States, citing the same US patent as the Topogon. The Metrogon was introduced in the early 1940s at the same cost "as a light automobile", limiting its market to aerial surveillance cameras for the United States Army Air Corps. A later patent by Wilbur B. Rayton, assigned to Bausch & Lomb in 1943, separated one of the outer positive meniscus lenses into two air-spaced positive menisci, similar to an earlier patent issued in 1938 to Hasselkus & Richmond.

Although the main market for the Topogon similarly was aerial photography and mapping for military and government applications, a consumer version was produced for the pre-war Zeiss Ikon Contax 35mm rangefinder cameras and produced in small numbers as the Topogon 2.5 cm f/4. Lenses using similar designs also were produced by Canon (25mm f/3.5, 1956), KMZ (Oриoн-15/Orion-15 28mm f/6, 1964), and Nikon (W-NIKKOR·C 2.5cm f/4, 1954) for their rangefinder systems after World War II. In addition, Mamiya released a lens with a similar design for the Mamiya Press camera system, the Mamiya–Sekor 65mm f/6.3.

=== Hybrid designs ===
The front meniscus elements of the Topogon were paired with the rear half of a double Gauss by Albrecht Tronnier and released as the Voigtlander Ultragon, a wide angle lens for large format cameras.

As the opposite hybrid asymmetric design, the rear meniscus elements of the Topogon, forming a Gauss lens, have been paired with the front elements from a Planar-type double Gauss lens, resulting in the designs shared by the Schneider Kreuznach Xenotar (1952) and Zeiss Planar (1953) & Biometar (1959). The Xenotar and Planar were fitted to Rolleiflex TLR cameras as an upgrade over Tessar/Xenar types, and the Biometar was the standard lens for the Pentacon Six (aka Praktisix / Exakta 66) SLRs, with a Xenotar available for the same camera.

Topogon derivatives

Topogon derivative by Hasselkus & Richmond (1936), from US 2,116,264

Bausch & Lomb Metrogon by Rayton (1942), from US 2,325,275

Voigtländer Ultragon by Tronnier (1951), from US 2,670,659

Schneider Xenotar by Klemt & Macher (1952), from US 2,683,398

Zeiss Planar by Lange (1953), from US 2,724,994

Zeiss Biometar by Zöllner (1959), from US 2,968,221
