= Zeiss Biogon =

Series of photographic camera lenses

Biogon
- Introduced in: 1934, 1951
- Author: Ludwig Bertele
- Construction: 8 elements in 5 groups
- Aperture: 4.5

Biogon is the brand name of Carl Zeiss for a series of photographic camera lenses, first introduced in 1934. Biogons are typically wide-angle lenses.

== History ==
=== Biogon (I), 1934 ===
Biogon (I) and developments

Zeiss Biogon [I] by Bertele (1934), from US 2,084,309

Wild Aviotar by Bertele (1947), from US 2,549,159

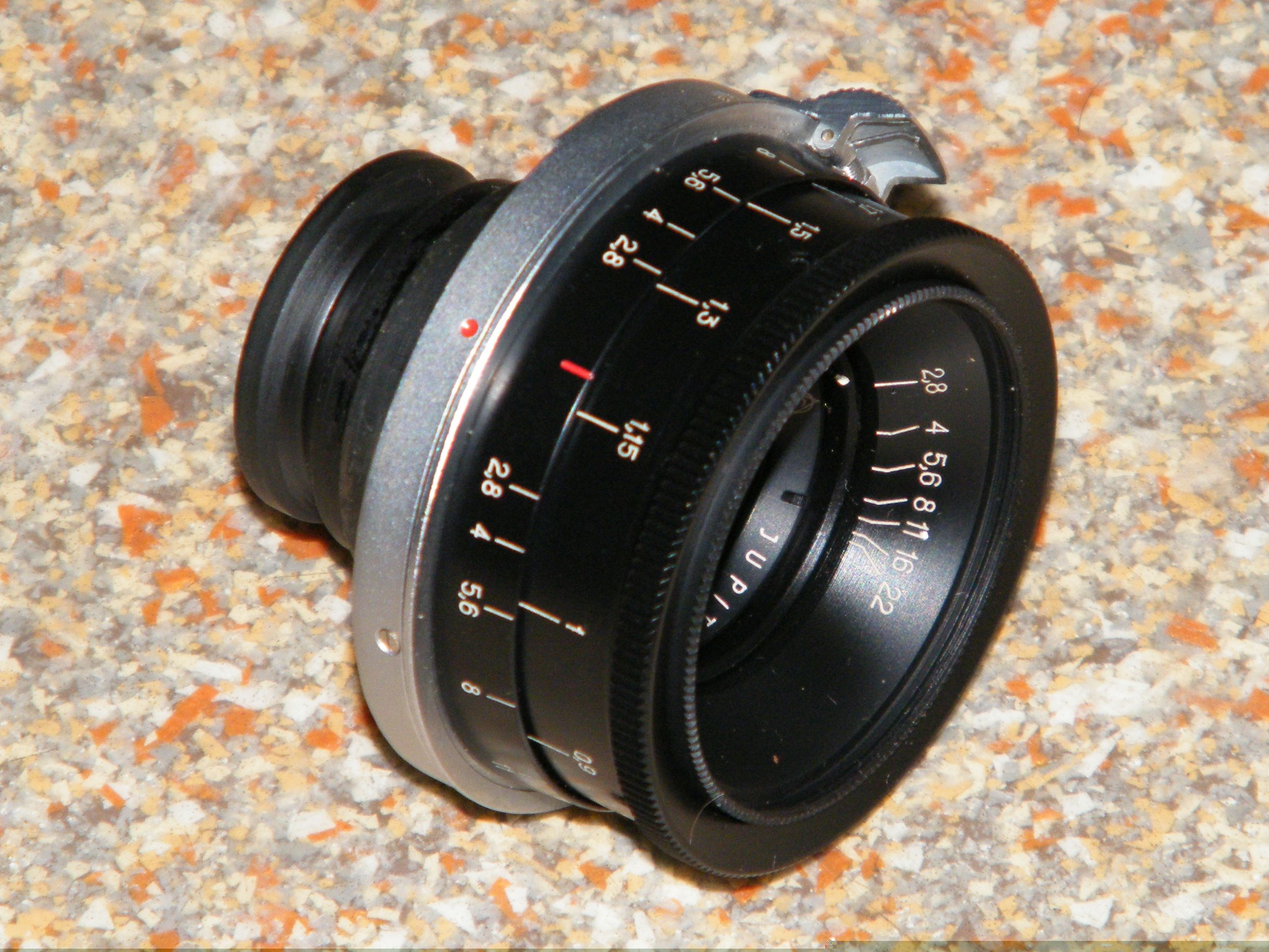
KMZ Jupiter-12 lens

The first Biogon lens (2.8 / 3.5 cm, an asymmetric design featuring seven elements in four groups) was designed in 1934 by Ludwig Bertele while he was working for Zeiss, as a modification of his earlier Sonnar design (1929). The Biogon was assigned to Zeiss Ikon Dresden and marketed with the Contax rangefinder camera. It was produced by Carl Zeiss starting in approximately 1937, first in Jena, then a redesigned version was built in Oberkochen.

Bertele would go on to reuse the design for the Wild Aviotar. After World War II, KMZ also reused the Biogon design for the Jupiter-12.

=== Biogon (II), 1951 ===
Biogon (II) and antecedents

Schneider Angulon by Tronnier (1930), from US 1,882,530

Zeiss Topogon by Richter (1933), from US 2,031,792

Roosinov (1946), from US 2,516,724

Wild Aviogon by Bertele (1950), from US 2,734,424

Zeiss Biogon by Bertele (1951), from US 2,721,499

Symmetric wide-angle lenses with meniscus elements facing the object and image had been developed in the 1930s, including the Schneider Kreuznach Angulon (Tronnier, 1930) with two outer negative menisci, derived from the Goerz Dagor (Emil von Höegh, 1892); and the Zeiss Topogon (Richter, 1933) with two outer positive menisci, derived from the Goerz Hypergon (1900). These concepts were combined in a symmetric super-wide angle lens design using mirrored inverted telephoto lenses, as patented by Roosinov in 1946.

In 1950, Bertele designed the Wild Aviogon as a similar highly-symmetric wide-angle lens with a large angular coverage. The following year, in 1951, Bertele designed a new Biogon with a 90° angle of view (Super Wide Angle). The Biogon has been characterized as a simpler Aviogon. Compared to the Aviogon, the Biogon removed a meniscus element and simplified the group ahead of the aperture.

The first regular production Biogon lenses were produced from 1954 as the 4.5 / 21 mm for Contax, in 1954, 4.5 / 38 mm for Hasselblad Super Wide, and from 1955 to 1956 as the 4.5 / 53 mm and 4.5 / 75 mm for Linhof. The original patent spanned three different variants, each with a different maximum aperture: f/6.3, f/4.5, and f/3.4 lenses.

Biogon (II) retrofocus development

AEG Weitwinkelobjektiv (1932), from DRP 620,538

Zeiss Sphaerogon by Merté (1935), from US 2,126,126

Angénieux Retrofocus (1950), from US 2,649,022

"Wide-angle lens" by Bertele (1952), from US 2,730,016

The advent of the Biogon opened the way to more extreme wide-angle lenses. Bertele continued to develop his design, patenting an asymmetric wide-angle lens in 1952 that covered an astonishing 120° angle of view "and beyond, practically distortion free", by adding a strong negative meniscus front element to the Biogon design, showing influences from earlier fisheye lens designs, including the AEG Weitwinkelobjektiv (1932) and Zeiss Sphaerogon (1935, Willy Merté), and the Angénieux retrofocus (1950).

== Examples ==
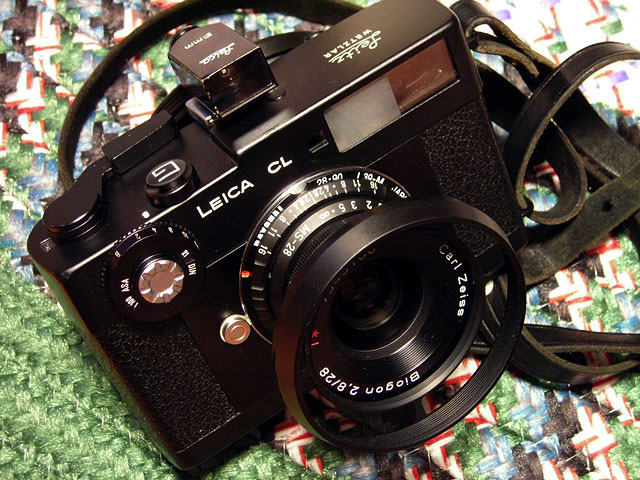
Leica CL with Carl Zeiss Biogon 2,8 / 28 mm lens

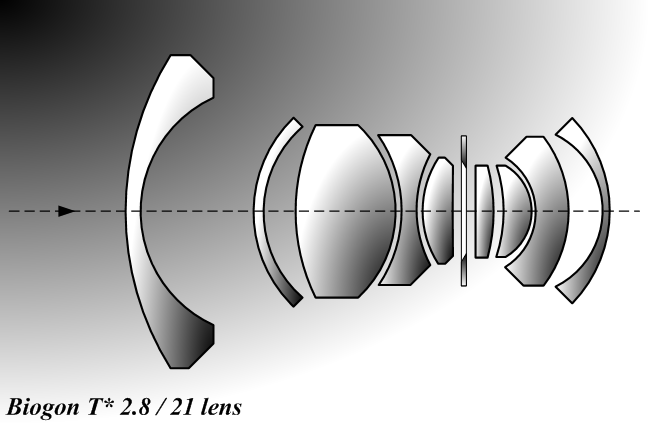
Zeiss Biogon 2,8 / 21 mm lens

Since their introduction, lenses branded Biogon are usually approximately symmetrical ("semi-symmetrical") wide-angle design with a usable angle of view of 90° or more. At 90° the focal length is approximately half as long as the format's diagonal.

Well known camera manufacturers like Hasselblad have or had Biogon derived lenses to offer.

- Biogon 1:2,8 f = 21 mm, 90° angle (PDF-File; 65 kB)
- Biogon 1:4,5 f = 21 mm, T* Classic, 90° angle (PDF-File; 282 kB)
- Biogon 1:2,8 f = 25 mm, 82° angle (PDF-File; 292 kB)
- Biogon 1:2,8 f = 28 mm, 75° angle (PDF-File; 182 kB)
- Biogon 1:2,0 f = 35 mm, 63° angle (PDF-File; 266 kB)
- Biogon 1:4,5 f = 38 mm CFi for Hasselblad (Medium Format; PDF-File; 166 kB)
- Biogon 1:4,5 f = 53 mm, image diameter of 115 mm, for professional cameras up to the 6 × 9 cm
- Biogon 1:5,6 f = 60 mm for Hasselblad (Medium Format, including the Apollo Moon mission, PDF file, 857 kB); PDF-File; 857 kB)
- Biogon 1:4,5 f = 75 mm, image diameter of 153 mm, 92° angle, for large-format professional cameras up to 4 × 5 inches

=== Influence ===
Symmetric super-wide angle lenses similar to Biogon (II)

Schneider Kreuznach Super-Angulon by Klemt (1954), from US 2,781,695

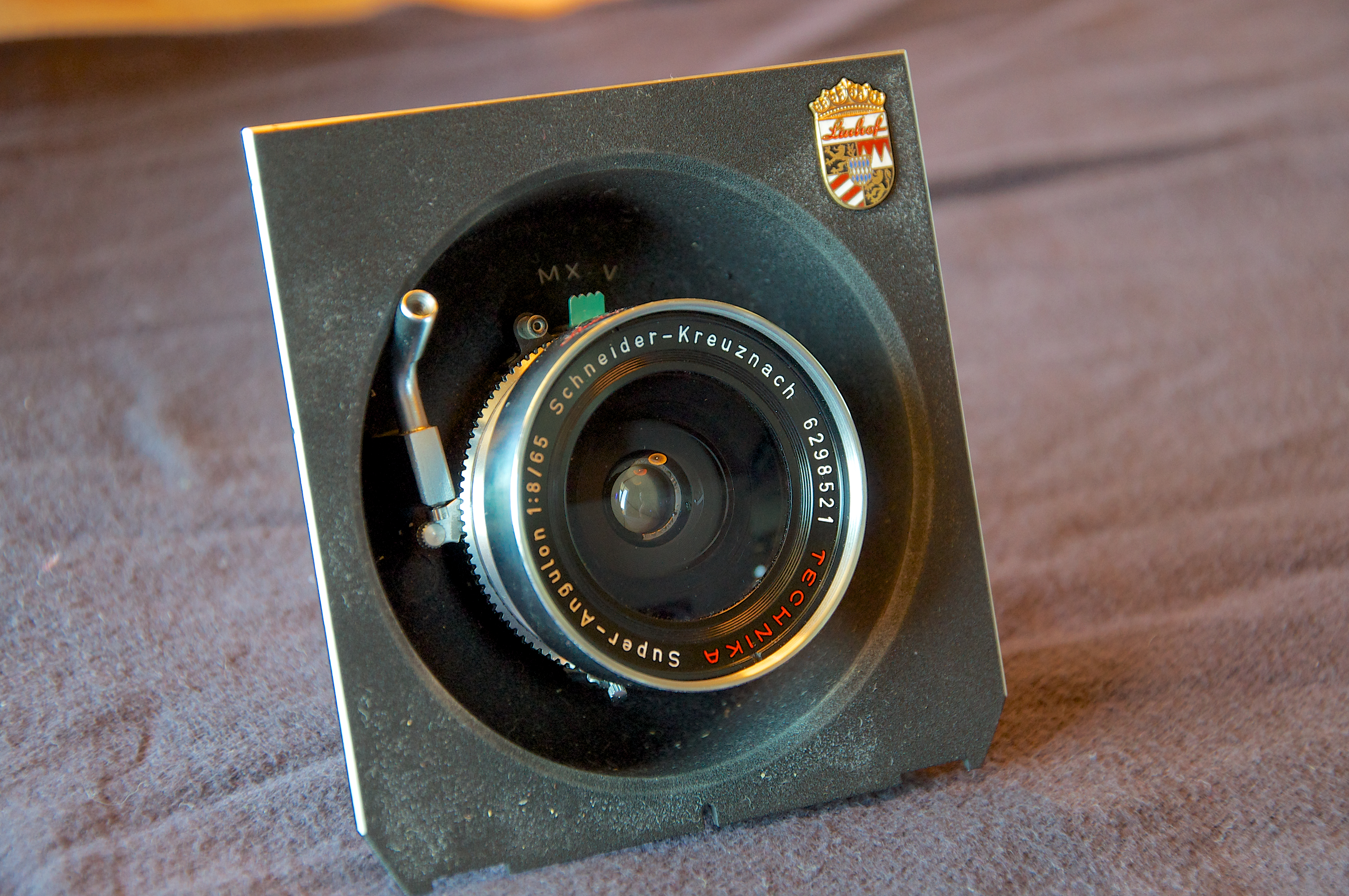
Schneider Kreuznach Super-Angulon 65 mm f/8 for Linhof cameras

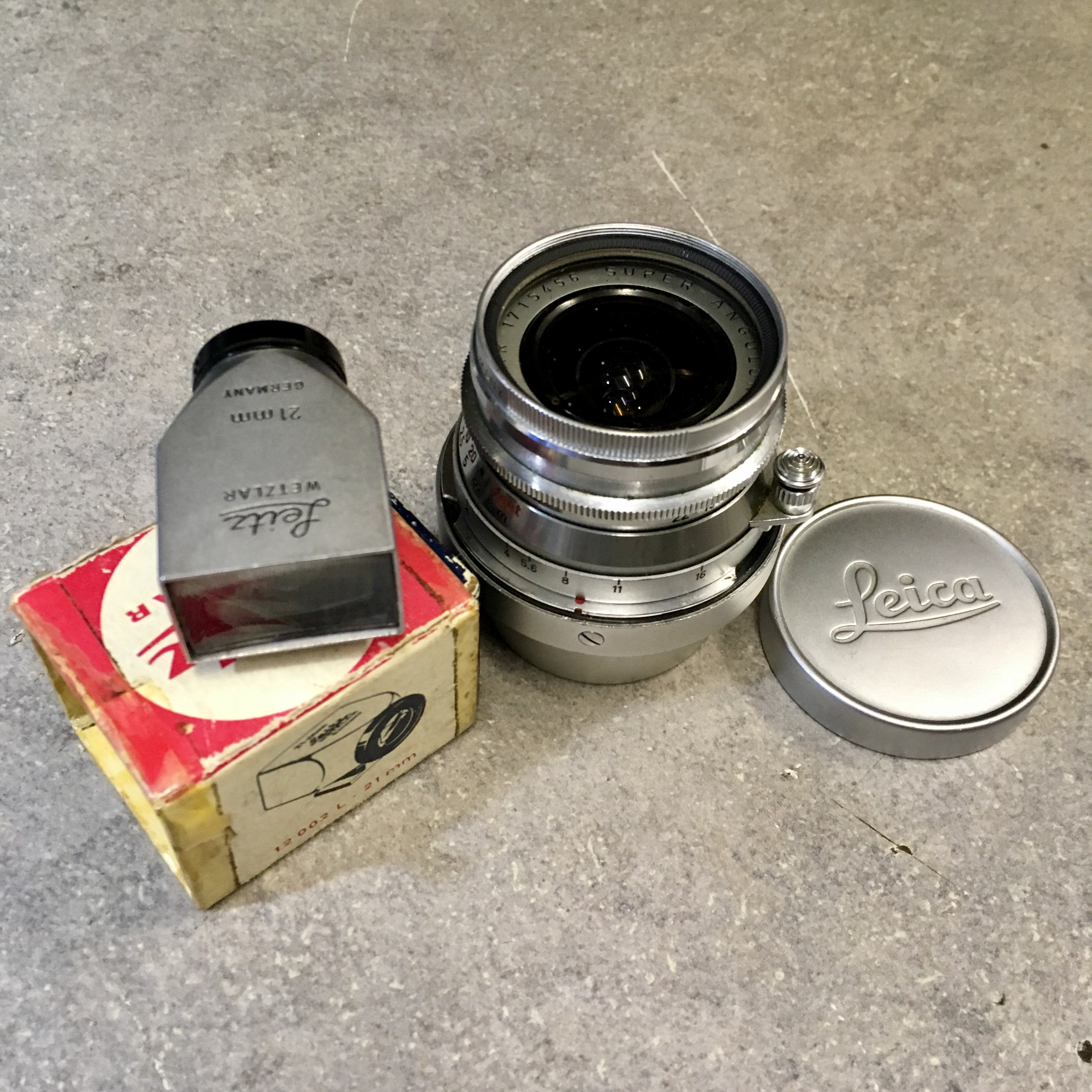
Licensed Super-Angulon 21 mm f/4 for Leica thread mount rangefinders

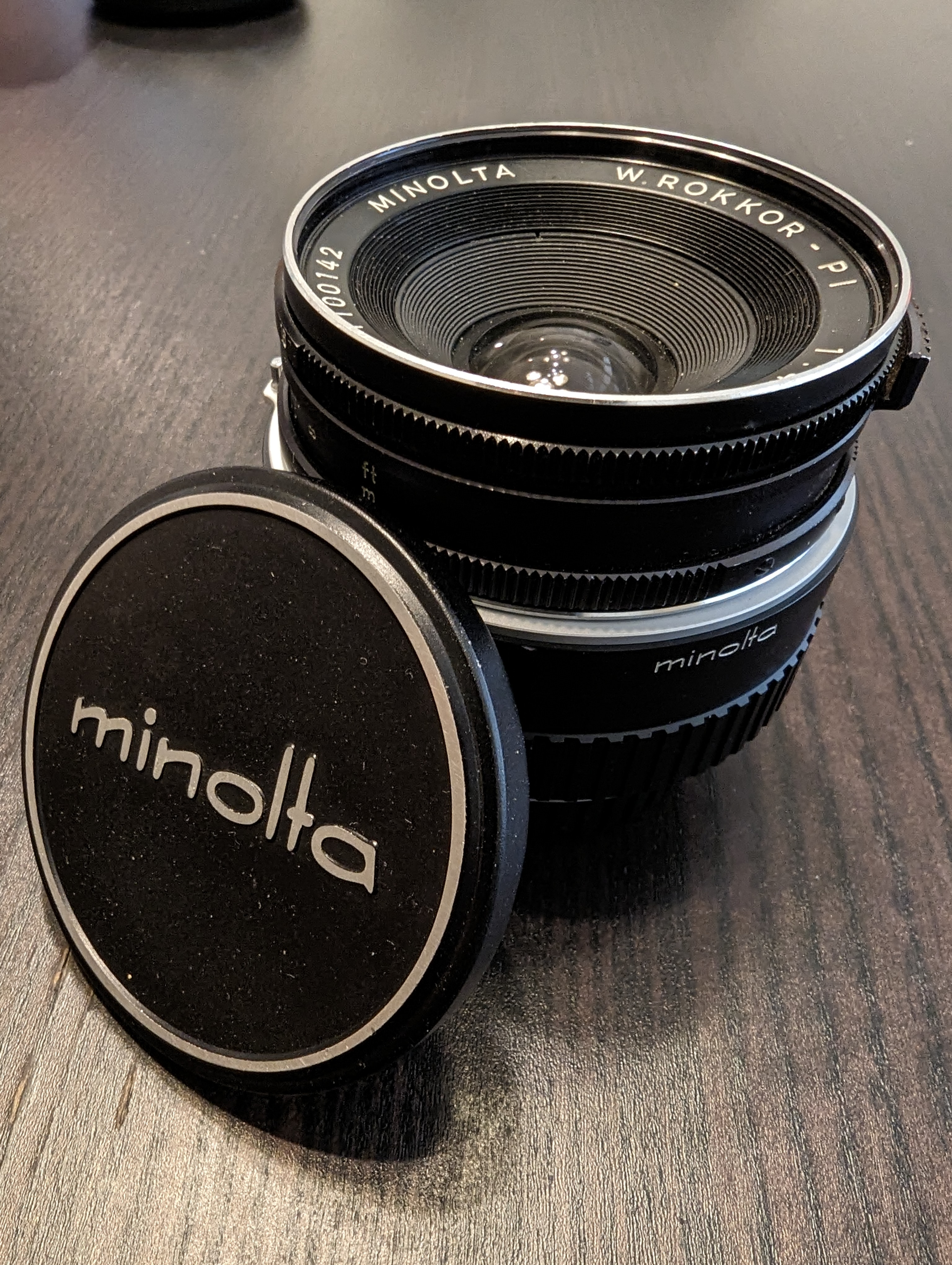
W.Rokkor-PI 21 mm f/4.5 for Minolta SR-mount SLRs

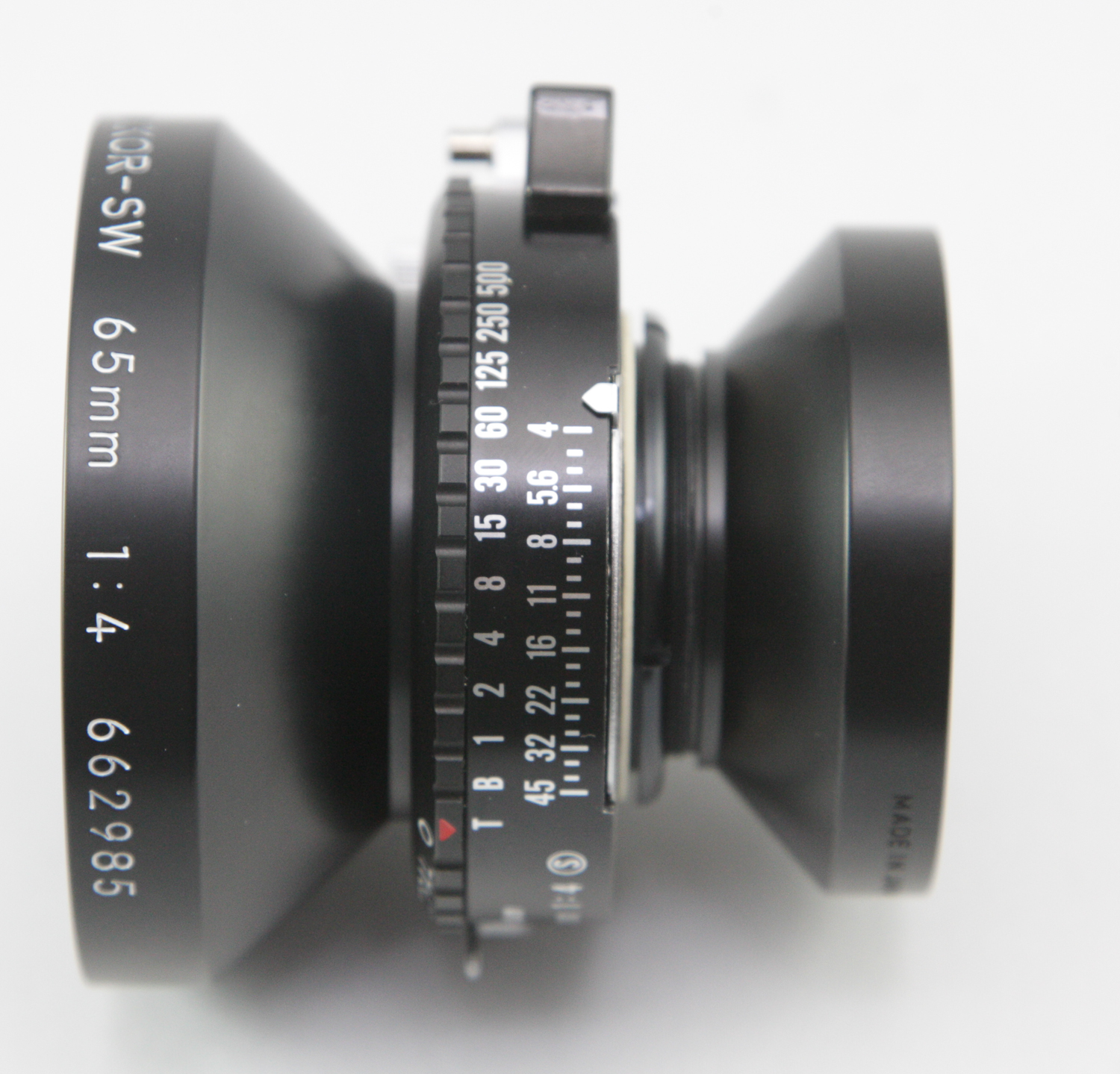
Nikkor-SW 65 mm f/4 for large format cameras

Several companies developed and sold highly symmetric super-wide angle lenses similar to the Biogon, including:

- Super-Angulon, sold by Schneider Kreuznach for large format cameras and licensed by Leica Camera as a 21 mm f/4 lens for Leica screw mount rangefinder cameras and a later f/3.4 lens for both M rangefinder and R SLR mounts; an unrelated Super-Angulon-R 21 mm f/4 was introduced a few years later, using a retrofocus design, as the prior symmetric design required the mirror to be locked up.
- Grandagon, sold by Rodenstock for large format cameras
- Nikkor-O 2.1 cm f/4, sold by Nikon in both S rangefinder and F SLR mounts; with the Nikon F, the lens must be used with the mirror locked up. This was replaced for the SLRs by the Nikkor-UD 20 mm f/3.5 retrofocus lens. Nikon also sold the Nikkor-SW line of highly symmetric super-wide angle lenses for large format cameras.
- W.Rokkor-PI f/4.5 and W.Rokkor-QH f/4 21 mm lenses, sold by Minolta in SR mount. These were succeeded by the W.Rokkor-NL retrofocus lens, which did not require mirror lock-up.
- Fujinon-SW, a six-element, four-group design similar to the Super Angulon sold by Fujifilm for both its line of Fujica medium format rangefinder cameras (G690/BL, GM670, GSW6xx) and large format cameras; an improved version (8e/4g) for large format cameras with slightly greater coverage was sold as the Fujinon-SWD.

Günter Klemt patented the Super-Angulon for Schneider in 1954, citing Roosinov's 1946 patent; neither the Wild or Zeiss patents by Bertele were cited; The Super Angulon design shares the same six-element, four-group construction with inner cemented doublets flanked by large negative meniscus elements with the Roosinov patent, diverging significantly from Bertele's Aviogon/Biogon designs. The Super-Angulon bears more similarities to the prior Angulon, designed by Albrecht Tronnier for Schneider in 1930 as another highly symmetric wide-angle lens with two cemented triplets. A later 1957 patent by Klemt in collaboration with Karl Heinrich Macher, refining the Super Angulon design for Schneider, added citations to Bertele's patents.

Wild continued to refine the Aviogon and filed for a patent on a simplified design in 1952; that patent, in turn, was cited by Drs. Erhard Glatzel and Hans Schulz in their 1966 patent for the Hologon.

== See also ==
- Biotar
- Tessar
- Planar
- Sonnar
- Distagon
- Flektogon
- Hologon
