= Tessar =

Photographic lens design

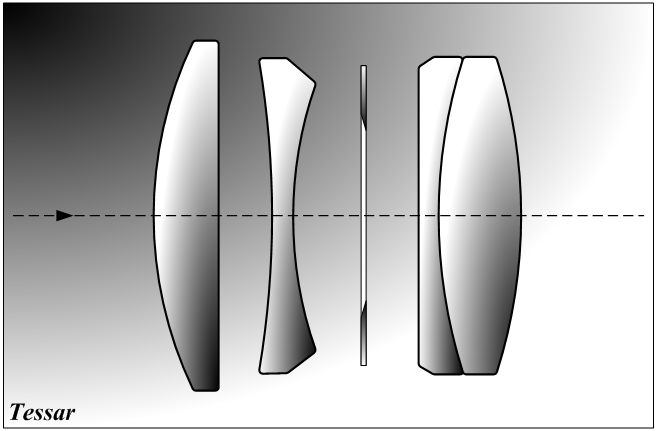
- Introduced in: 1902
- Author: Paul Rudolph
- Construction: 4 elements in 3 groups
- Aperture: f/6.3 (1902) f/4.5 (1907) f/2.8 (1930, by Willy Merté)

The Tessar is a photographic lens design conceived by the German physicist Dr. Paul Rudolph in 1902 while he worked at the Zeiss optical company and patented by Zeiss in Germany; the lens type is usually known as the Zeiss Tessar. Since its introduction, millions of Tessar and Tessar-derived lenses have been manufactured by Zeiss and other manufacturers, and are still produced as excellent intermediate aperture lenses.

The Tessar design uses four spherical lens elements in three groups, one positive crown glass element at the front, one negative flint glass element at the center and a negative concave flint glass element cemented with a positive convex crown glass element at the rear.

== History ==
Tessar and design antecedents

Zeiss Protar (aka Anastigmat; Rudolph, 1890)

Cooke Triplet (Taylor, 1893)

Dallmeyer Stigmatic (Aldis, 1895)

Zeiss Unar (Rudolph, 1899)

Zeiss Tessar (Rudolph, 1902)

=== Beginnings ===
Despite common belief, the Tessar was not developed from the 1893 Cooke triplet design, although it appears the Tessar replaces the single rear element of the Cooke triplet with a cemented achromatic doublet. Instead, the Tessar underwent a parallel evolution from Paul Rudolph's 1890 Anastigmat lens, which had four elements in two cemented groups. Hugh L. Aldis patented the Stigmatic lens line for Dallmeyer in 1895; in one implementation, the front group from the Anastigmat design was modified by adding a narrow air gap, which acted as a positive element and improved zonal correction. Later, Rudolph adopted the same device to modify the Anastigmat design, resulting in the Unar of 1899. In addition, this allowed the photographers to have greater freedom when choosing the lenses. In one implementation, the Unar has four air-spaced elements in four groups, which replaced the two cemented interfaces of the earlier Anastigmat design.

In 1902, Rudolph realized the two cemented interfaces had many virtues, so he reinserted them in the back of his Anastigmat, maintaining the "air gap" of the previous part of the Unar, thus creating the Tessar design (from the Greek word τέσσερα (téssera, four) to indicate a design of four elements) of 1902. The frontal element of the Tessar, like that of the Anastigmat, had little power since its only function was to correct the few aberrations produced by the powerful posterior element. The set of interfaces cemented in the posterior element had 3 functions: to reduce the spherical aberration; reduce the overcorrected spherical-oblique aberration; and reduce the gap found between astigmatic foci.

=== Improvements and evolutions ===
The first Tessar appeared with a maximum aperture of f/6.3, but by 1917, the maximum aperture had been increased to f/4.5. In 1930, Ernst Wandersleb and Willy Merté from Zeiss developed Tessar lenses with apertures of f/3.5 and f/2.8.

In 1925, E. Wandersleb and W. Merté of Zeiss created the Biotessar consisting of two elements cemented in the front, a single negative element in the center, and three cemented in the rear.

After World War II and the partitioning of Germany, the Zeiss factory at Eisfeld ended up in East Germany; Zeiss Jena developed a popular camera line named the 'Werra', after the Werra river which runs through the town. Many models were equipped with Tessar lenses, which were marked as "Zeiss-Tessar", resulting in legal action from the Zeiss company in Western Germany. For a while the Werra Tessar lenses were marked simply as "T", but eventually they were allowed to market the lenses as "Carl Zeiss Jena Tessar".

Tessar improvements and derived lens designs

Ross Xpres (Stuart & Hasselkus, 1913)

Berthiot Olor (Florian, 1913)

Leitz Elmar (Berek, 1920)

Biotessar (Merté & Wandersleb, 1925)

Improved Tessar (Merté & Wandersleb, 1930)

Schneider Xenar (Tronnier, 1935)

Voigtländer Skopar (Tronnier, 1949)

=== Tessar-derived lenses ===
Zeiss had strong control over the Tessar design, because Rudolph's patent was very general. In the corresponding U.S. Patent, he claimed:

"A spherically, chromatically and astigmatically corrected objective, consisting of four lenses separated by the diaphragm into two groups each of two lenses, of which groups one includes a pair of facing surfaces and the other a cemented surface, the power of the pair of facing surfaces being negative and that of the cemented surface positive."

—Paul Rudolph, US Pat. 721,240

The Tessar design patent was held by Zeiss for two decades, and licensed to Ross in the United Kingdom, Bausch & Lomb in the United States, and to Krauss in France. Only licensed manufacturers were allowed to use the brand name Tessar. Many other manufacturers tried to copy the design of the Tessar lenses but due to the breadth of the patent, they could not. The simplest way was to use a cemented triplet for the rear group instead of a doublet. In 1913, many designs of this type appeared, including the Ross Xpress by J. Stuart and J.W. Hasselkus, Gundlach Radar, and Berthiot Olor by Florian.

After the patent expired, Tessar-derived lenses were widely made by many manufacturers under different trade names. For example, the Minoxar 35/2.8 lens on the Minox M.D.C and GT-E is the fastest and widest Tessar-type lens achieved so far by using lanthanum glass elements. The picture quality was outstanding. Other Tessar-type lenses include:

- Agfa Solinar
- Kodak Ektar (some, but not all)
- KMZ Industar
- Minolta Rokkor 75mm (twin-lens-reflex design)
- Rodenstock Ysar
- Schneider Xenar
- Voigtländer Skopar
- Yashica Yashinon 80mm (twin-lens-reflex design)

==== Leitz Elmar ====
It is sometimes believed the Leitz Elmar 50 mm f/3.5, designed by Max Berek in 1920, was derived from the Tessar, as they share the same general layout. The Elmar lenses were used in the first Leica cameras.

Although the Tessar and Elmar lenses appear similar in layout, there is a lot more to the design and performance of a lens than simply the layout of the glass elements. The position of the stop, the optical characteristics of the glasses used for each element, the curvature of each lens surface, and the negative format that the lens is designed to cover, are all vital to the performance of the lens, and in the Leica lens these were all different from the Tessar.

When the Leica was being developed, Oskar Barnack tried a 50 mm Tessar, but because it had been designed to cover only the 18×24 mm field of a cine frame, he found it inadequate for coverage of the Leica 24×36 mm format. The lens designed by Max Berek for the Leica rangefinder camera was a modified Cooke triplet with five elements in three groups, the third group being three cemented elements, with the aperture stop in the first air space. This lens, called the Elmax, gave good coverage of the 24×36 mm format and was used until improved optical glass allowed the third group to be simplified to a cemented pair when it was renamed Elmar. It was not until Zeiss Ikon was developing the Contax camera to compete with the Leica that the Tessar was redesigned to cover a 24×36 mm negative.

=== Pro Tessar ===
The front element of the Tessar can be replaced to make a long-focus or wide-angle lens. In 1957 Carl Zeiss offered the long-focus Pro Tessar 115 mm f/4 and 85 mm f/4, and the wide-angle Pro Tessar 35 mm f/3,2 for use on the central-shutter SLR Zeiss Ikon Contaflex Super B cameras.

=== Licensed Tessar lenses / Vario-Tessar ===
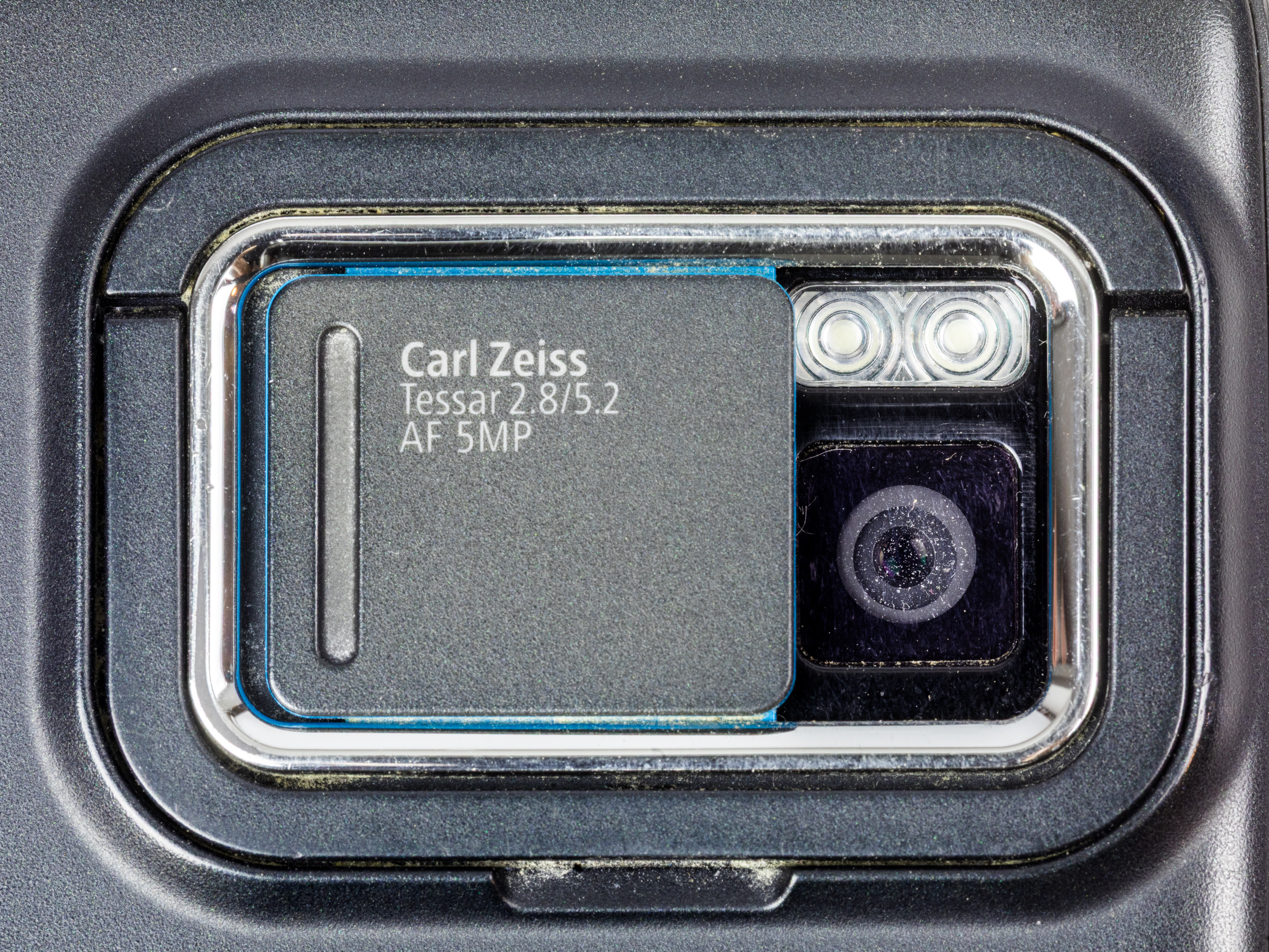
Nokia N900 with Tessar 2.8/5.2

Other Tessar lenses, for example those equipped on certain Nokia mobile phones, have only the name Tessar in common with the original Tessar, not the four-element, three-group design. They are for example a 5-elements-in-1-group, aperture-less all-aspherical lens, as in the Nokia 808 Pureview and Nokia Lumia 800 camera.

Vario-Tessar lenses also only have the name Tessar in common with the original Tessar. The Vario-Tessar name has been used by Zeiss for various zoom lenses fitted to Sony cameras, including that of the digital still cameras Sony Cyber-shot DSC-P100, DSC-P200, and DSC-W330 as well as the E-mount lenses such as Sony Alpha Carl Zeiss Vario-Tessar T* E 4/16-70mm ZA OSS (Sony SEL-1670Z) and Sony Alpha Carl Zeiss Vario-Tessar T* FE 4/16-35mm ZA OSS. Sony also uses Vario-Tessar lens branding for their consumer camcorders such as the HDR-CX405 extending the wide angle view with 1.9mm to 57mm zoom range.

== Design ==
Tessar lenses

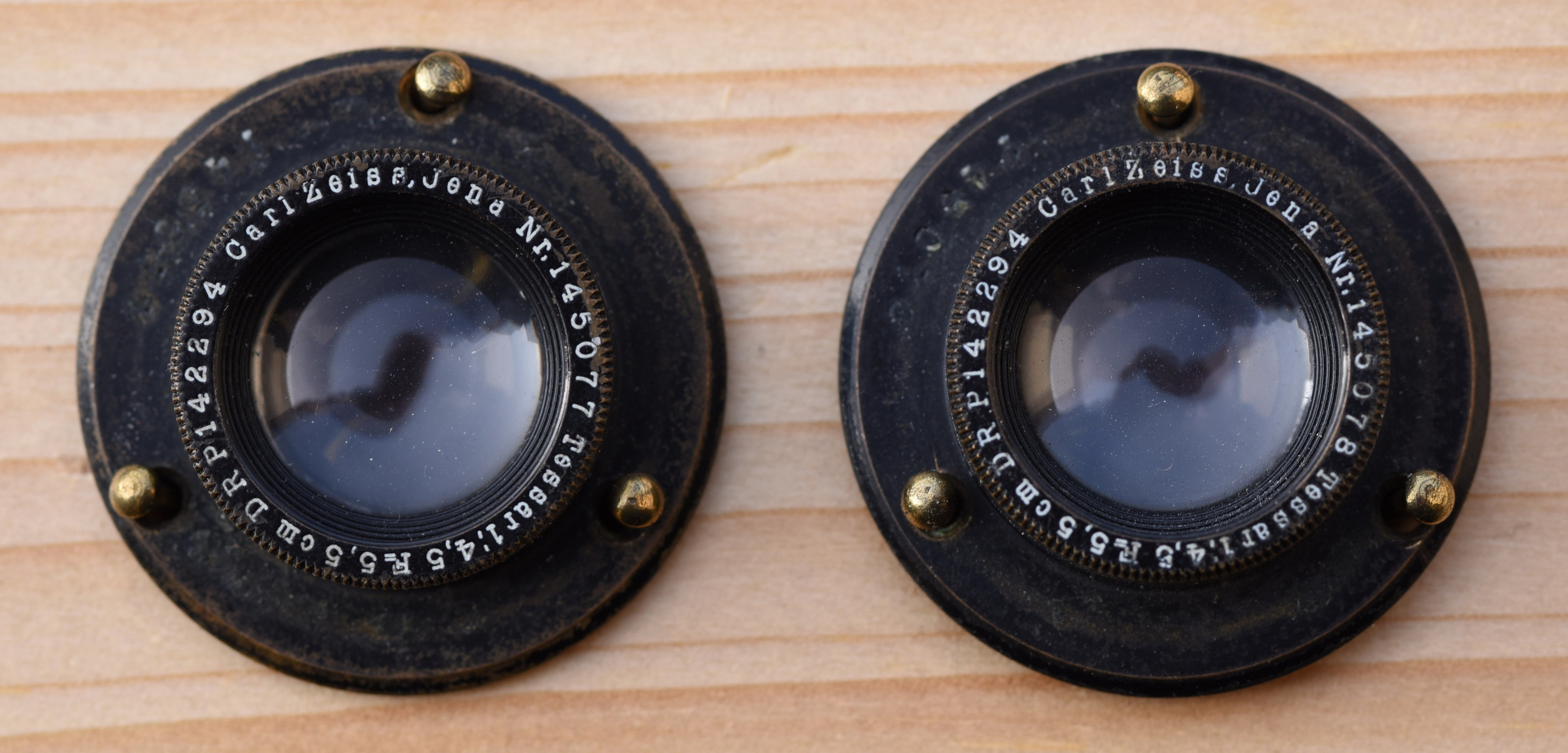
2 historical lenses Carl Zeiss, Jena, Nr. 145077 and Nr. 145078, Tessar 1:4,5 F=5,5cm DRP 142294 (produced before 1910)

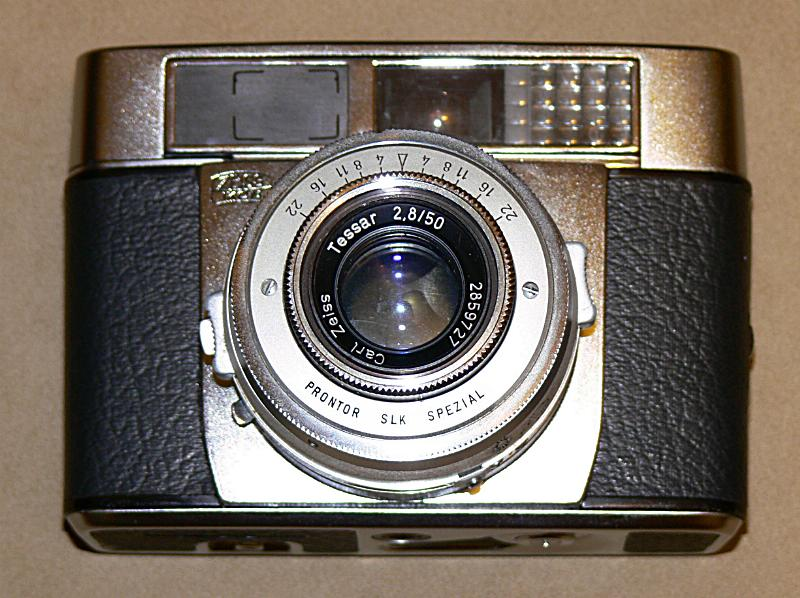
Carl Zeiss Tessar 50/2.8 lens on Zeiss Ikon Contessa camera.

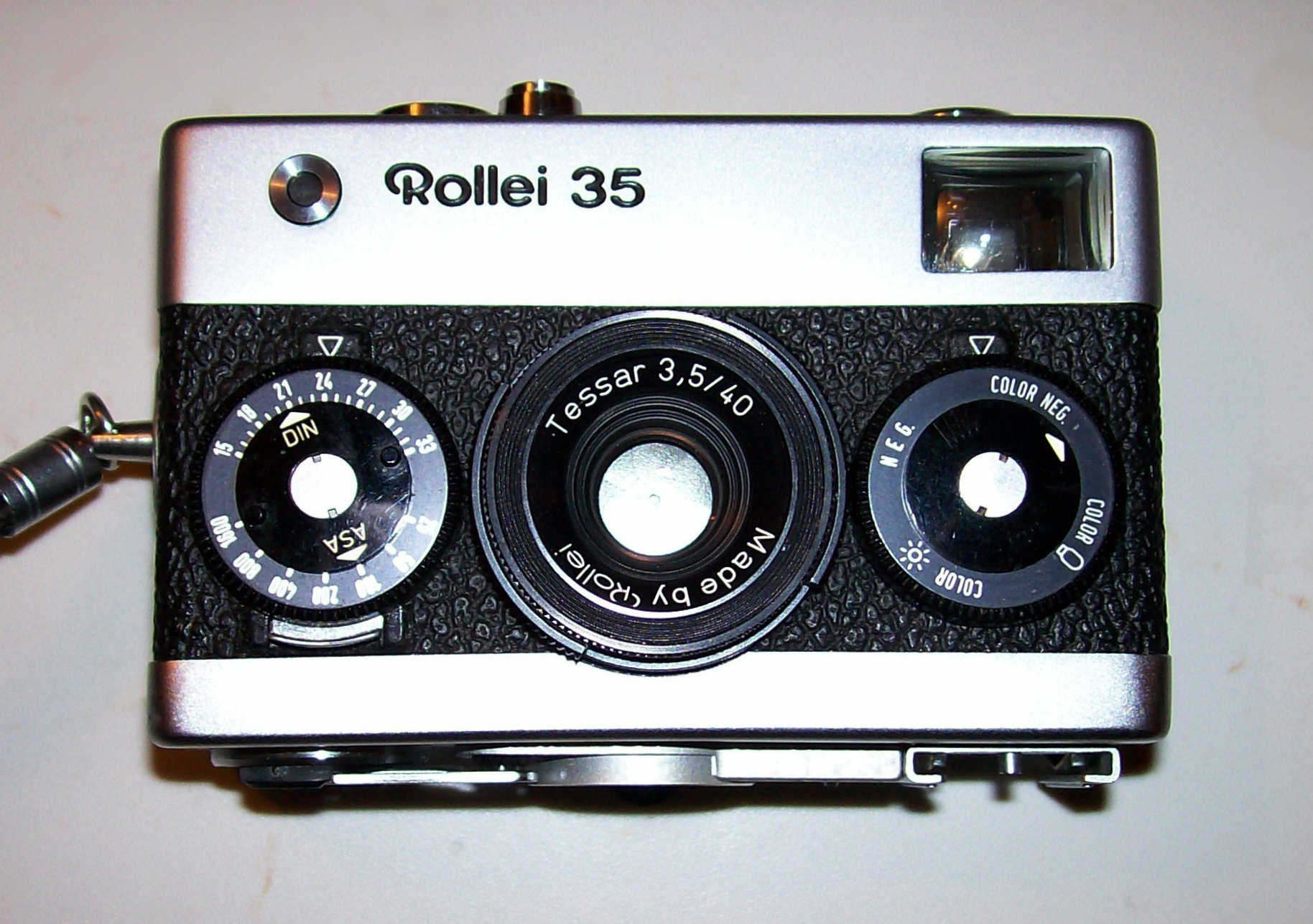
Tessar 40/3.5 lens made by Rollei.

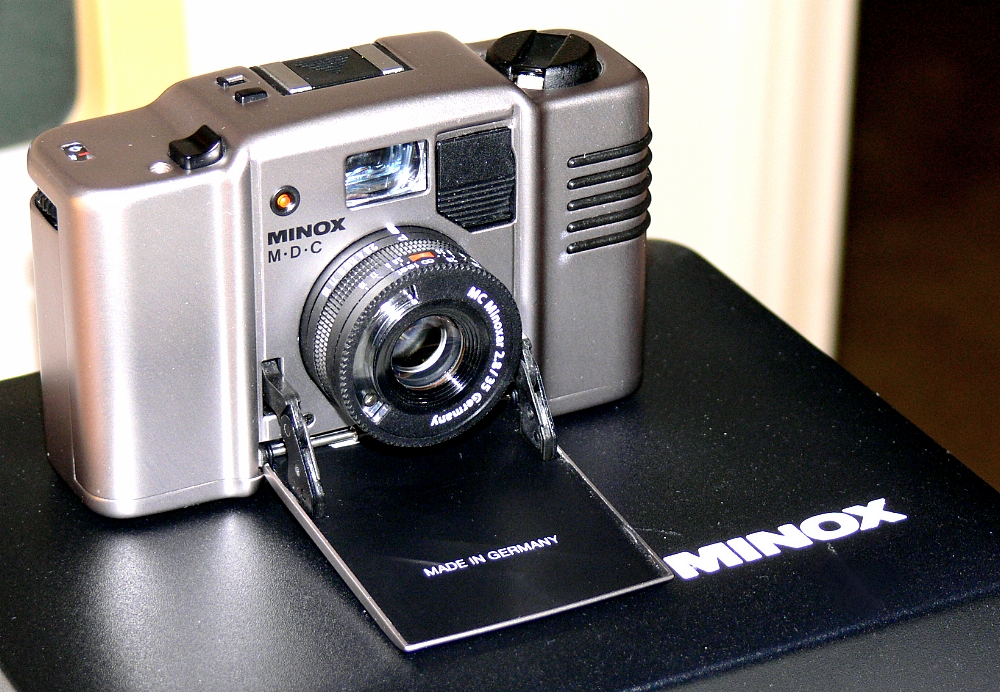
Minox MDC Minoxar 35mm/2.8 lens, a wide angle Tessar type lens.

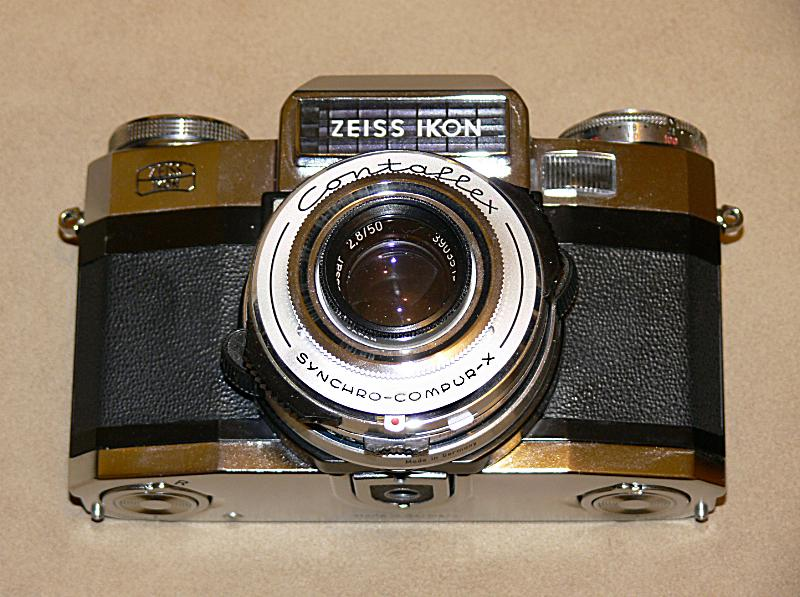
Unit focusing Tessar 50/2.8 of Zeiss Ikon Contaflex Super B. The front element of this Tessar can be replaced with Tele Pro Tessar or Wide angle Pro Tessar.

=== Common uses ===
Tessar lenses are frequently found in mid-range cameras, as they can provide a very good optical performance at a reasonable price, and are often quite compact. They are also frequently used in photographic enlargers, as they provide more contrast than many competing lens designs due to the limited number of air-to-glass surfaces.

=== Focusing methods ===
All lenses can be focused by moving the lens assembly towards or away from the film ("unit focusing"), and the Tessar is no exception. Unit-focusing Tessars were used on higher-end cameras such as the Contaflex Super B, Rolleiflex TLR, and larger-format plate cameras such as the Maximar.

Some lenses, including Tessars, can be focused by moving lens elements relative to each other; this usually worsens optical performance to some extent, but is cheaper to implement. As the front element of the Tessar has three times the power of the whole lens, it must be moved one-third of the distance that the whole lens would need to move to focus at the same point. The large airspace between the first and second elements allows focusing by moving the front element only; as the displacement is small compared with the airspace, the adverse effect on image performance is not severe. The front-element-focusing Tessar, cheaper than a unit-focusing lens, was widely used in many midrange Zeiss Ikon cameras.

== See also ==
- Pancake lens
- Biotar
- Planar
- Sonnar
- Biogon
- Distagon
- Flektogon
- Hologon
- Elmar (lens)
