= Hologon =

Type of photographic recording lens

- Introduced in: 1966
- Author: Erhard Glatzel
- Construction: 3 elements in 3 groups
- Aperture: ƒ/8

The Zeiss Hologon is an ultra wide-angle f=15mm f/8 triplet lens, providing a 110° angle of view for 35mm format cameras. The Hologon was originally fitted to a dedicated camera, the Zeiss Ikon Contarex Hologon in the late 1960s; as sales of that camera were poor and the Zeiss Ikon company itself was going bankrupt, an additional 225 lenses were made in Leica M mount and released for sale in 1972 as the only Zeiss-branded lenses for Leica rangefinders until the ZM line was released in 2005. The Hologon name was revived in 1994 for a recomputed f=16mm f/8 lens fitted to the Contax G series of rangefinder cameras.

== Design ==
The Hologon was designed by Erhard Glatzel and others at Zeiss in 1966 and patented in 1972. It is a largely symmetric triplet with a fixed aperture; the original German patent application describes a lens with 120° angle of coverage and a f/8 maximum aperture, while the US patent expands this to three related designs with different coverage angles and apertures (120° f/8, 110° f/5.6, and 90° f/8). In each design, the first and third hemispherical elements are made of optical glass with the same refractive index. At least one prototype Hologon was built in 1964 or 1965 as a large-format lens with a focal length of 110 mm. It has been shown via radiograph the large format Hologon 8/110mm uses a leaf shutter between the second and third elements, with adjustments to the first and third elements to accommodate it. The prototype Hologon, internally known as the Bilagon, was sold at auction in 2010 for €28,800.

The name "Hologon" is derived from the Greek words holos, meaning "everything" or "complete", and gonia, meaning "angle"; gonia contributed the final syllable -gon, which had been used in preceding Zeiss wide-angle lens designs such as the Zeiss Distagon and Biogon. As built, the symmetrical design for the Hologon 8/15mm by Glatzel provided excellent correction of coma, spherical and chromatic aberration, astigmatism, and curvature of field; the main fault was vignetting due to the cos^{4} law, which was corrected by supplying a graduated neutral density filter to make the exposure more even across the film frame. Although the lens consists of only three elements, manufacturing proved difficult.

=== Contarex Hologon ultra wide ===
The original Hologon (Contarex Hologon 8/15mm) was first released in 1969 as a f=15 mm f/8 lens affixed to a dedicated camera, the Zeiss Ikon Contarex Hologon. In this version, the lens is fixed focus and aperture; the size of the aperture is set by the incised notch in the second element. Depth of field ranged from 0.5 m (20 in) to infinity. A bubble level is fitted to the top of the (non-reflex) viewfinder. Typically, a pistol grip is affixed to the Hologon camera to avoid inadvertently taking pictures of the photographer's fingers.

Approximately 1,400 Contarex Hologon cameras were made; production continued through 1975 in small batches. In 1971, the list price for the Hologon was US$825 (equivalent to $6,559 in 2025), marked up from the wholesale cost of US$550 (equivalent to $4,372 in 2025).

=== M Hologon 8/15mm ===
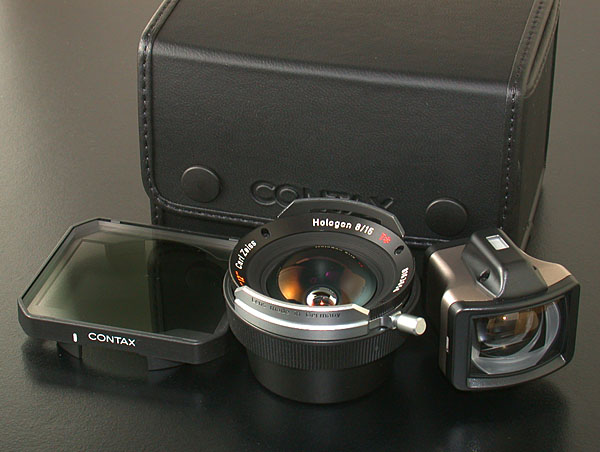
Hologon T* 16mm f/8 for Contax G, with finder, graduated filter, and case

The Contarex Hologon 8/15mm lens was later released as part of a set including a finder (with bubble level) and center graduated neutral density filter for Leica M cameras in 1972 (M Hologon 8/15mm). Estimates of production for the M Hologon 8/15mm range from 225 to 1,000. The M Hologon 8/15mm gained a focusing helicoid compared to the Contarex Hologon 8/15mm, and could now be focused down to 0.2 m (7.9 in). Because of the low production numbers and unique focal length, some lenses have been separated from the Contarex Hologon and adapted to Leica mount.

=== G Hologon 8/16mm ===
Revised G Hologon 8/16mm layout

The G Hologon 8/16mm was announced with the Contax G1 in 1994; the revised G Hologon 8/16mm retained the name from the earlier Contarex and M Hologon 8/15mm, but the construction was completely different, using 5 elements in 3 groups. Zeiss claimed that contrast had been improved by moving the rear element closer to the film plane. The new G Hologon 8/16mm was also provided with a graduated filter to provide a more even exposure. The revised construction of the G Hologon 8/16mm also simplified assembly of the lens, as the cemented groups were easier to manufacture than the hemispherical front and rear elements of the Contarex and M Hologon 8/15mm. Although nominally listed as a 16 mm lens, the focal length of the G Hologon 8/16mm is actually 16.5 mm and it provides coverage of 106° on the frame diagonal. The G Hologon 8/16mm was the only lens for the Contax G that was manufactured in Germany.

Like the earlier Contarex 8/15mm Hologon, the G Hologon 8/16mm also has been adapted unofficially to Leica M mount.
