= Contax =

Camera brand

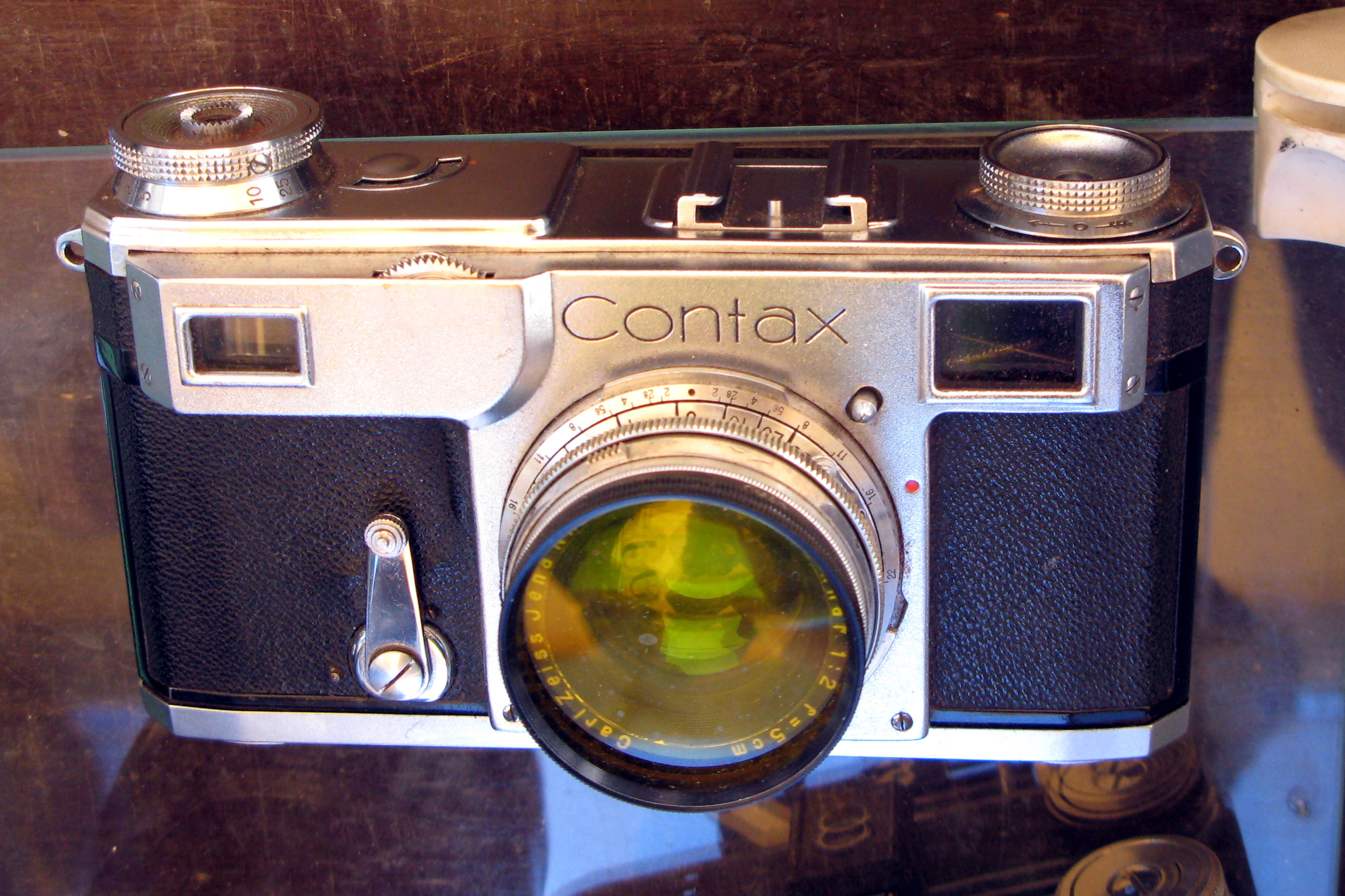
- Contax II, 1936
- Product type: Film cameras
- Current owner: Carl Zeiss AG
- Produced by: Carl Zeiss AG, Yashica
- Country: Germany
- Introduced: 1932
- Discontinued: 2005
- Related brands: Zeiss Ikon, Yashica, Kyocera
- Markets: Worldwide

Contax (stylised as CONTAX in the Yashica/Kyocera era) began as a German camera model in the Zeiss Ikon line in 1932, and later became a brand name. The early cameras were among the finest in the world, typically featuring high quality Zeiss interchangeable lenses. The final products under the Contax name were a line of 35 mm, medium format, and digital cameras engineered and manufactured by the Japanese multinational Kyocera, and featuring modern Zeiss optics. In 2005, Kyocera announced that it would no longer produce Contax cameras. The rights to the brand are currently owned by Carl Zeiss AG, but no Contax cameras are currently in production, and the brand is considered dormant.

== Historical overview ==
While the firm of Ernst Leitz of Wetzlar established the 24 mm × 36 mm negative format on perforated 35 mm movie film as a viable photographic system, Zeiss Ikon of Dresden decided to produce a competitor designed to be superior in every way. The name Contax was chosen after a poll among Zeiss employees. Dr. Ing. Heinz Küppenbender was its chief designer.

=== Pre-war ===
Made between 1932 and 1936, the original Contax, known as Contax I after later models were introduced, was markedly different from the corresponding Leica. Using a die-cast alloy body it housed a vertically travelling metal focal-plane shutter reminiscent of the one used in Contessa-Nettel cameras, made out of interlocking blackened brass slats somewhat like a roll-up garage door. This complex shutter became the characteristic of the Contax camera and its Super-Nettel derivative. By contrast, the competitive Leica followed the established design of using rubberized fabric shutter curtains wound around rollers, moving horizontally. The Contax design allowed a higher maximum shutter speed: the top speed was 1/1000s, then increased to 1/1250s in the Contax II. The fact that the shutter ran across the shorter dimension of the format area was a significant factor for achieving this technical feat. The interlocking slats were aligned by specially woven silk ribbons, which were very strong but subject to wear. Replacing these ribbons was difficult but, contrary to modern cameras, made for a 400,000-cycle life.

Zeiss also invented the System Camera, with all sorts of near-photo, wide-angle, mirror-house, long-focal-length lenses for specific situations. However Zeiss called it Universalkamera.

One of the key design features was a coupled rangefinder with a very long baseline, with its own eyepiece next to that of the viewfinder. To enhance accuracy, a novel rotating wedge system was employed instead of the common swinging mirror mechanism. Other main features included focusing drive built into the camera body for use with standard lens, removable back, shutter-speed knob integral with film-wind knob placed at the front of the camera body, and black-enamelled finish.

The young lens designer Ludwig Bertele, formerly of Ernemann, was charged with the responsibility of designing the lenses, including the Biogon and Sonnar.

The greatest advantage of the Zeiss lenses was the reduced number of air-to-glass surfaces in Bertele's designs. In the years before lens coating was generally practiced, this had advantages for contrast and resistance to lens flare. Zeiss also pioneered glass coating, and before the war coated lenses were offered. After lens coating became universal post WW2, designers were given more freedom in using extra air-to-glass surfaces in correcting lens aberrations, without fear of the ill effects of surface reflections.

In 1936 the Contax II and III models were introduced; the only difference between them was the integral exposure meter on the latter model. They introduced the combined eyepiece for both viewfinder and rangefinder, the shutter speed and film wind knob placed on the top plate, fastest shutter speed at 1/1250s. and finished in chrome plating. They became very popular among professional photographers, such as Robert Capa and Phil Stern, especially photojournalists who demanded high-performance, large-aperture lenses for available-light work and a workhorse. The vertical shutter had both variations in speed, slit and a brake at the end of travel that was again a Zeiss first.

=== Post-war division ===
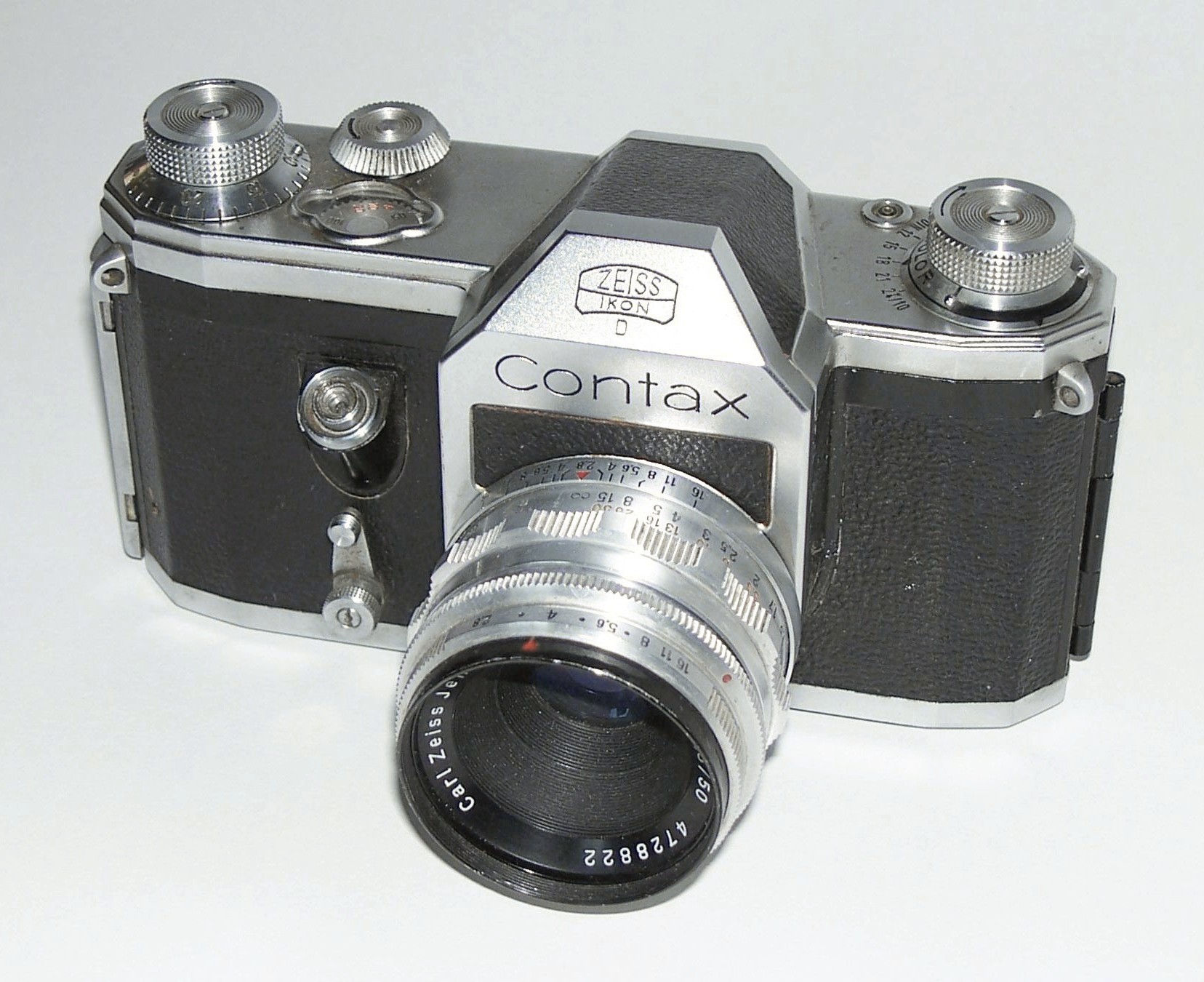
A historic camera: the East Germany Contax S of 1949

After the Second World War, a few Contax cameras were produced at the original Dresden factory, and some were assembled at the Carl Zeiss optical works at Jena, before production was transferred to Kyiv in Ukraine. During the war years, the chief designer, Hubert Nerwin, tried to convert the Contax into a single-lens reflex camera but was hindered by the presence of the upper roller of the vertical focal-plane shutter. The postwar design chief Wilhelm Winzenberg started with a clean slate, which became the Contax S (Spiegelreflex, literally "Mirror reflex"), even though the "S" was not marked on the camera.

The Contax S can be said to be the camera that defined the configuration of the modern 35mm SLR camera. Not only did it introduce the M42 lens mount which became an industry standard, but it was also equipped with a horizontal focal-plane shutter, and also removed a major objection against the reflex camera by offering an unreversed, eye-level viewing image by employing a pentaprism. Introduced in 1949, the S was followed by numerous models including D, E, F, FB, FM and FBM. During that period, VEB Zeiss Ikon, as the firm became known, was gradually under pressure from the new Zeiss Ikon AG in the US zone, so the original Zeiss Ikon and Contax names and trademarks gradually disappeared and were replaced by the new name of Pentacon, which never really caught on. Finally, this camera line was abandoned.

Meanwhile, in the US zone, the three main Zeiss concerns – Carl Zeiss Stiftung (Carl Zeiss Foundation), Carl Zeiss optical, and Zeiss Ikon – were reestablished. With Hubert Nerwin in charge as design chief, Zeiss Ikon produced heavily revised Contax IIa and IIIa cameras at a new plant at Stuttgart until 1962. Zeiss Ikon also produced several SLR camera lines starting from the 1950s, including the Contaflex SLR, Contarex, Bessamatic (as Voigtländer, which had been acquired in 1956), and Icarex, but none of these bore the Contax brand. Zeiss Ikon ceased camera production in 1972.

With the emergence of the Japanese camera industry, mainly a consequence of the US pressure on West Germany's Zeiss to cease collaboration with the East German Zeiss, and also the lack of raw materials the former was enduring, it was in a way forced to form an alliance with a Japanese maker. Asahi, maker of the Pentax, was engaged first; and it went as far as Zeiss designing a common bayonet lens mount, which constituted a detour from Pentax's adoption of the East German M42 mount; the new bayonet mount was named for many years as the "Pentax Mount" to avoid any accreditation to the Eastern Bloc, and later became known as the Pentax K-mount after the two firms parted company.

=== Licensed branding ===
An alliance was then formed with Yashica, and a new line of CONTAX single-lens reflex cameras was born, starting with the RTS of 1975. Numerous models followed, which also included autofocus rangefinders, compacts, medium-format reflex cameras, and digital cameras.

Rival Leica in the 1970s and 1980s used West German Zeiss-designed wide-angle lenses for their own cameras. The 15 mm Hologon was the first super-wide lens on a Leica, and the Leica reflex had access to the 15 mm Distagon lens as part of the Leitz supplied range.

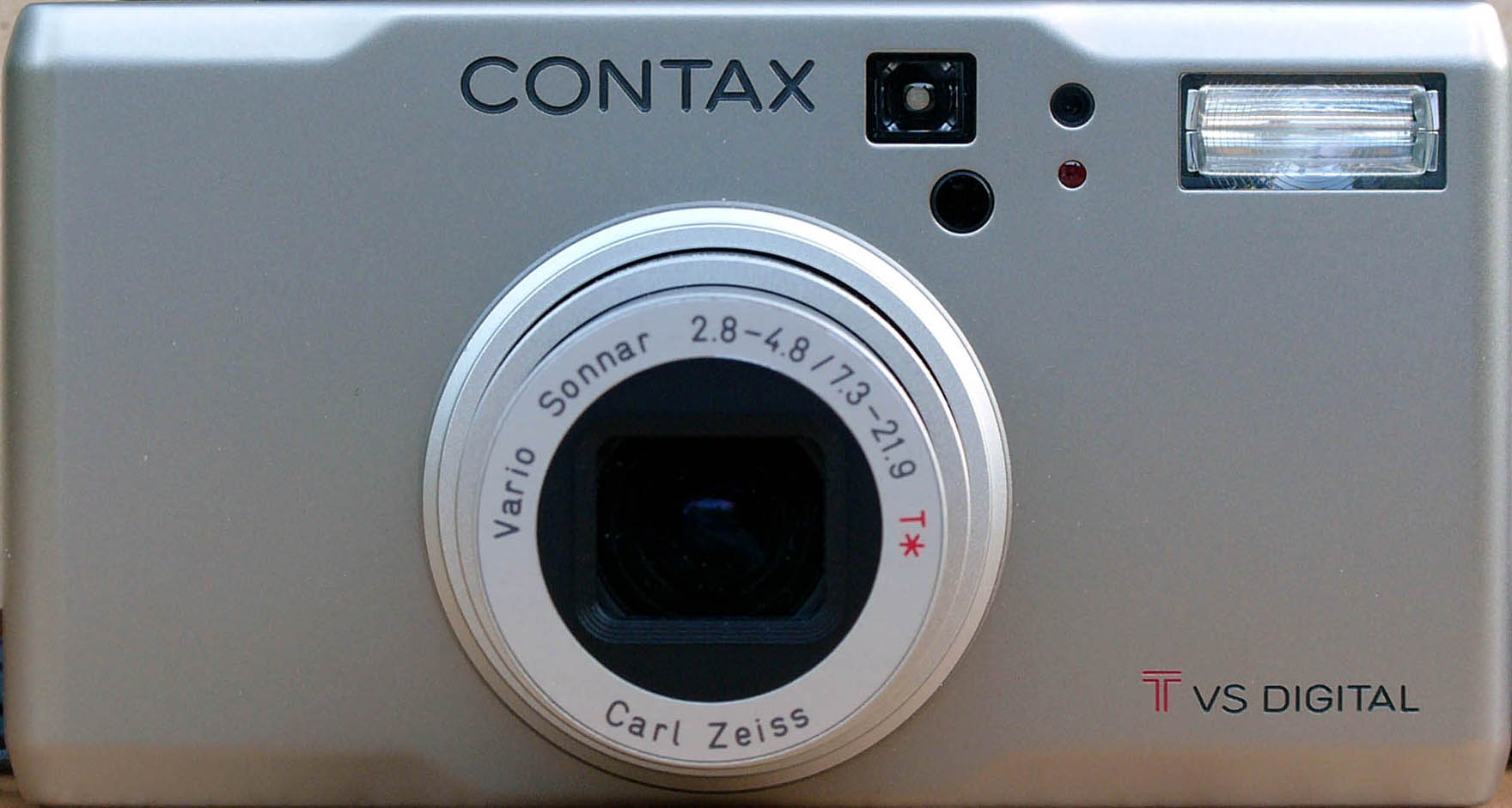
Contax TVS Digital with Zeiss Vario-Sonnar 2.8–4.8

Kyocera acquired Yashica in 1983 and continued to manufacture products under the Yashica and Contax brands. In the mid-90s came their Contax G1 with outstanding lenses and a little later the G2, both fully manual or automatic, featuring the first zoom lens for a rangefinder camera as part of a range of Zeiss-branded lenses from 16 mm to 90 mm. However, by 2002 the company's film camera products were declining in sales, and its newer digital camera products failed to make serious inroads into the digital-photographic market. In 2005, Kyocera discontinued all photographic equipment manufacture, including the Contax brand in 2005, thus, for now, bringing the Contax story to a close.

== Zeiss Ikon cameras ==
=== Original (pre-war) rangefinder models ===
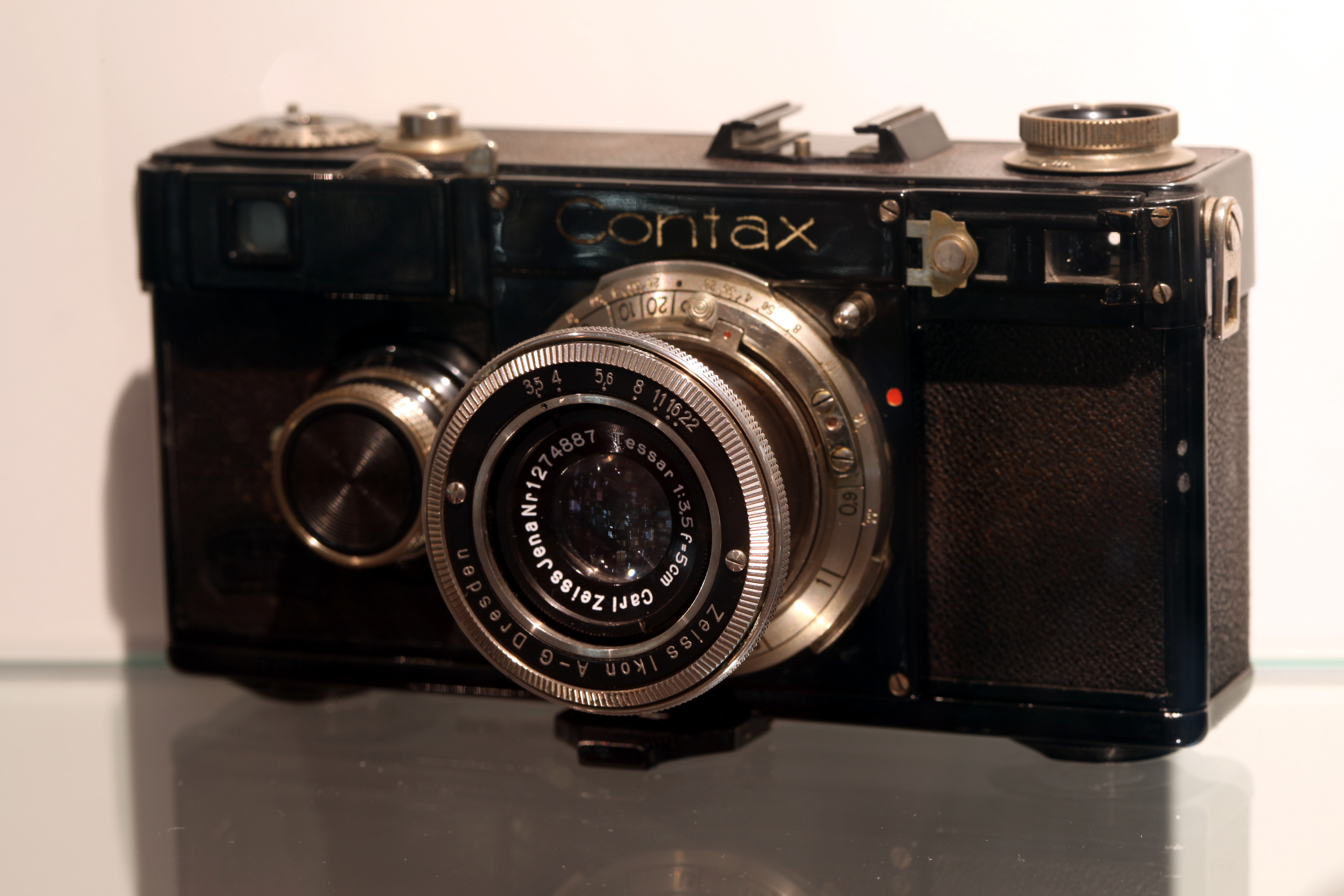
Zeiss Ikon Contax I (1932–36)

In contrast to the contemporary Leica which was evolved from its original concept into a photographic system, the Contax was designed as the heart of a photographic system from the start. A heavily engineered machine of tremendous complexity, it was Zeiss Ikon's showcase of the technology it possessed.

The Contax I had six identifiable variants, but fundamentally identical; every aspect was designed to be better than the Leica. For instance, the removable back was for faster loading and reloading, the bayonet lens mount was designed for rapid lens interchangeability, the long-base rangefinder was for more accurate focusing with large aperture lenses, and the vertical metal shutter not only gave a faster maximum speed but also banished the problem of shutter blinds burning.

However, its operation was something of an acquired taste, which explains the more conventional successors, the Contax II and III models. Not only was the combined shutter speed dial and film advance knob placed at the more conventional position, but it became much easier and quicker to operate. The combined viewfinder and rangefinder was not the first one on the market, but it was the first on a system camera which offered significant operational advantage, a lead ahead of the Leica until the Leica M3 of 1954.

=== IIa and IIIa ===
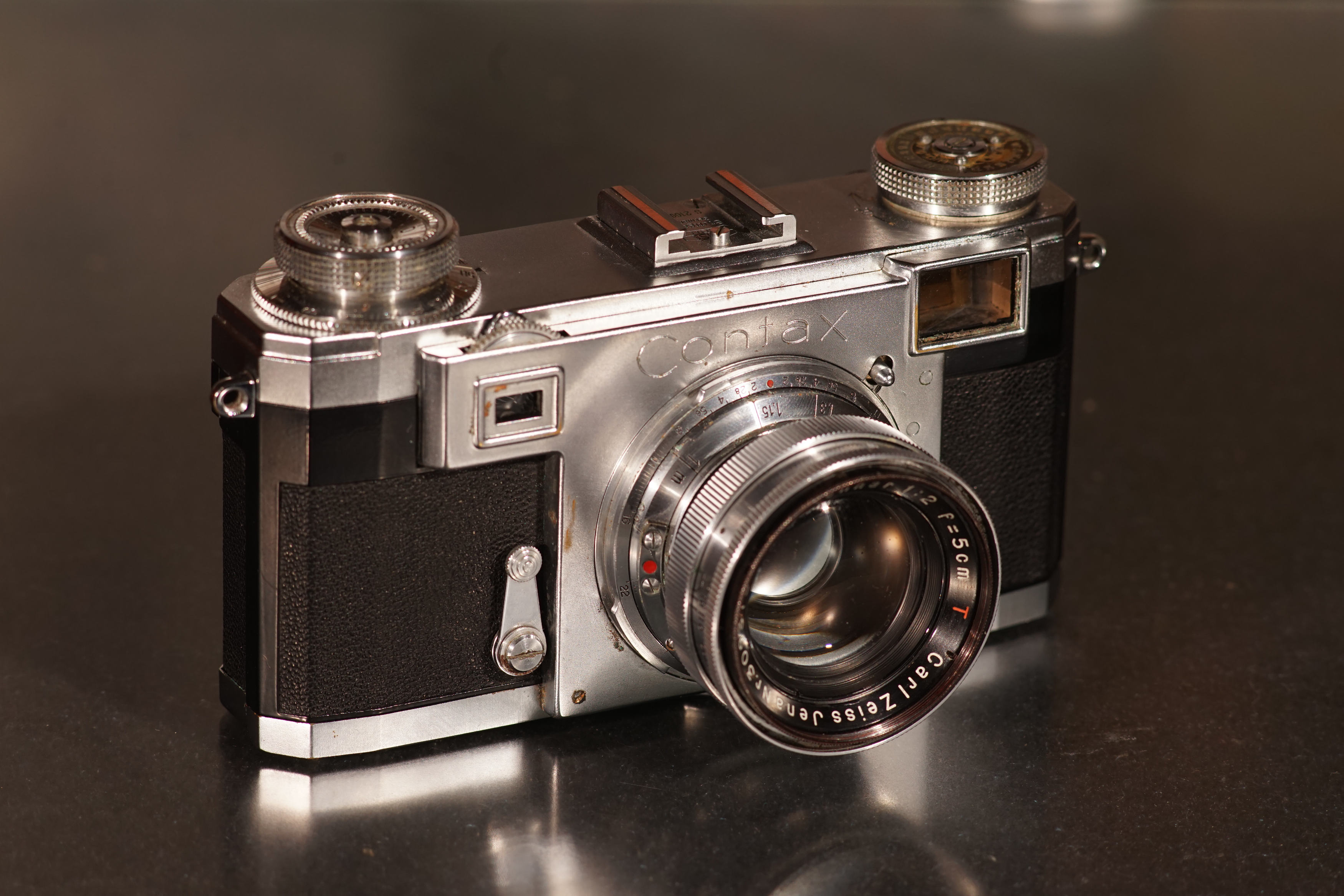
Contax IIa with Sonnar T f2,0 50 mm

Since the Contax was produced at the Dresden works before the war, the new Zeiss Ikon firm in West Germany (Stuttgart) did not have the tools to recommence production. The resultant Contax IIa and IIIa models, while sharing many similarities with the prewar forebears, also showed significant simplification and cost-cutting by using cheaper materials, due to the lack of resources. However, these simplifications were also largely responsible for making them somewhat more reliable.

Designed to retain backward compatibility, the IIa and IIIa (introduced in 1950 and 1951 respectively) used the same lens mount as the prewar models, but due to the smaller dark chamber inside the lens throat, the pre-war Biogon 35/2.8 wide-angle lens could not be fitted.

The Zeiss Ikon Model 563/24 was a complete redesign of the previous II/III cameras, and was sold by Zeiss Ikon (West Germany) from 1950 to 1961. Gone were the troublesome silk shutter straps; in their place were straps made of nylon; a flash synch was added; and the body's size and weight were reduced. Shutters were still guaranteed for 400,000 cycles. The same internal/external bayonet mount was kept. This line was an engineering and manufacturing tour de force, and is considered by many to be the finest camera ever made. As with the II and III, the IIa was the base camera, and the IIIa had an added exposure meter attached on top of the camera. The shutter curtains were changed to duraluminium, lighter and faster to start and stop; however, they were thicker, too. The old Biogon did not fit, so a new one was designed together with the new Biogon 21 mm f 4, gave new perspectives to wide angle photographing.

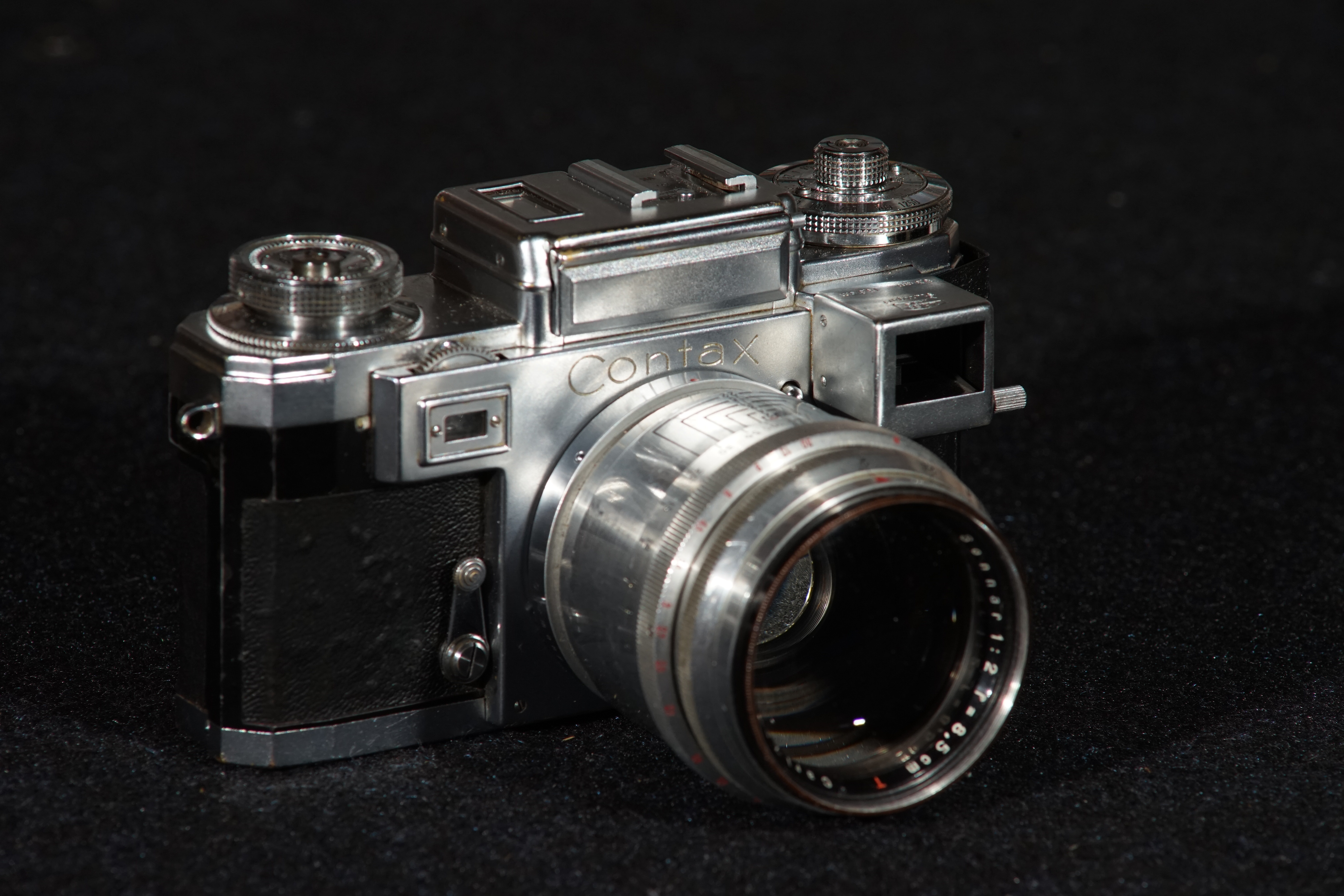
Contax III a with Sonnar T f2,0 85

Two basic variations of the IIa/IIIa were made: the so-called "black dial" and "color dial" cameras. The black dial cameras used a special flash synch cord for either flash bulbs (1361) or strobe flash (1366). On the color dial cameras the ability to use the flash bulbs was eliminated; a P/C connector was added, and strobe synchronization was the only option. Where the Leicas of the day had only electronic flash synch at 1/25s second shutter speed, the Contax IIa/IIIa was synched at 1/50s and all slower speeds. Further, with the adjustment on the 1365 flash cable used with the Black Dial camera, the user could tune the flash to the individual shutter, and synch strobe to the 1/100s! At the time, this sort of shutter speed with a strobe was unheard of, and was a major technological feat. On the later color dial cameras, the 1/50s marking on the shutter speed dial was painted chromate yellow, while the speeds of T, B, 1, 2, 5, 10, and 25 were black, and 100, 250, 500, and 1250 red.

The Contax IIa/IIIa ceased production in 1960 and was removed from the company catalog in 1961, replaced by the Contarex SLR. Ed Shoenecker, the longtime owner of a Zeiss dealer in Portland, Oregon, Hollywood Camera, described the abrupt change: "We could not keep the Contax bodies and lenses on the shelf, people were buying all they could afford, and putting things they couldn't afford on lay-away. Then the new catalog came out, and the Contax was gone. No explanation at all. We were in shock. The camera that replaced it (the Contarex SLR) was a fine camera, but it cost so much more money, it never made the inroads into the market the Contax did. Then, we had to stop carrying the Contarex because they were just too much money."

There is a demand for good working examples of the IIa/IIIa by collectors and users alike. As user cameras, they are versatile, compact, and easy to handle. The range of lenses made over the very long period of time the lens mount was in use, adds to the usefulness of this design.

=== Dresden-built SLR models ===
The loss of the Contax production tools at the Dresden factories turned out to be a blessing in disguise, as it forced the East German part of the company to design a camera without relying on the older design. The new design chief Wilhelm Winzenberg was not involved in the camera side of Zeiss-Ikon, this also allowed a brand-new Contax design to be developed, to follow Hubert Nerwin's wartime plan to make a Contax SLR camera.

As the traditional vertical-run Contax shutter required considerable space both above and below the film gate for the drum rollers, the upper roller takes up the critical space required for the reflex housing mechanism, making it dimensionally impossible to use it for a satisfactory SLR camera. Winzenberg solved the problem by the use of a completely new horizontal-run focal-plane shutter, thus allowing space for the reflex housing.

While the first 35 mm SLR camera, the Kine Exakta, had already appeared in 1936, before the war, its waist-level finder which gave a laterally reversed image, taking away the immediacy between the photographer and their subject. In the Contax reflex, which would be called the Contax S, a pentaprism was positioned directly above the focusing screen, which offered an eye-level, unreversed view of the viewfinder. This major technical advantage was critical in establishing the 35 mm SLR as the definitive camera type for the decades that followed.

Since a larger lens mount would be desirable, the Contax S adopted a threaded lens mount of M42×1mm specification, which was to become the de facto industry standard.

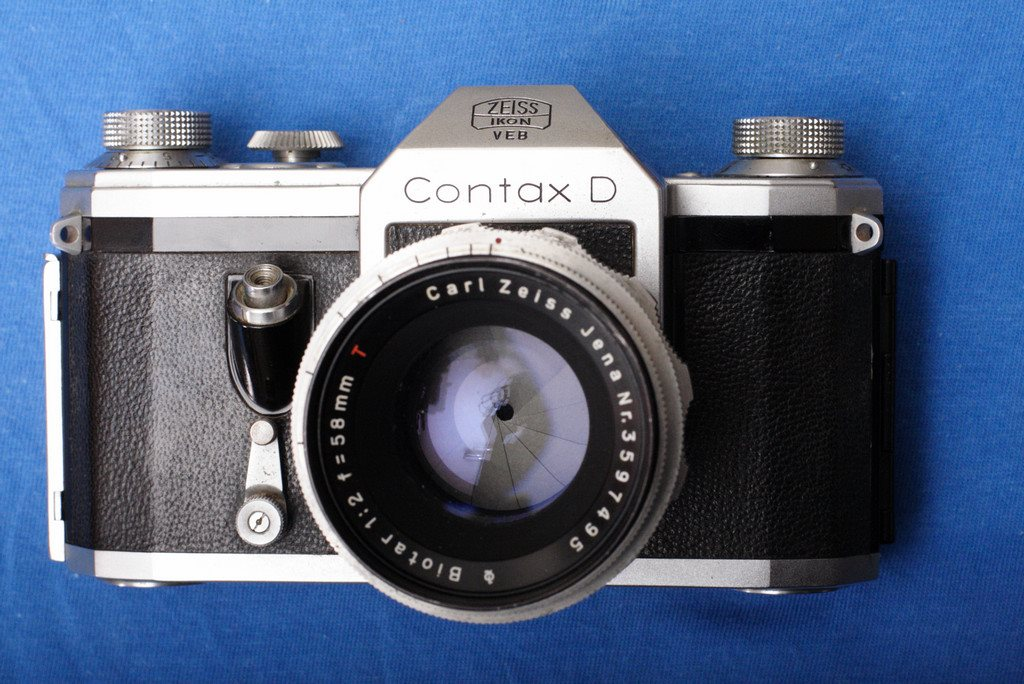
Contax D

When introduced in 1949, the Contax S was not marked as such, only "Contax", but increasing pressure from the new (West German) Zeiss Ikon company in Stuttgart induced (East German) Zeiss Ikon in Dresden to progressively abandon the use of the established trademark and names. The following model, known as "Contax D", first appeared with a little "D" marked under the Zeiss Ikon logo to signify its source as Dresden, but that was not good enough: in some markets it was sold as "Pentacon", a name contrived from "Pentaprism" and "Contax". The name "Pentax" had been considered before but, following Germany's capitulation in 1945, all German patents and trademarks were declared void; a Japanese company seized the "Pentax" brand and registered it.

Subsequent models were also made wearing both Contax and Pentacon nameplates; the former were meant for markets where Zeiss Ikon Dresden still held the rights to its name. Eventually, the company went on to form the Pentacon VEB conglomerate (which included companies as Meyer-Optik Görlitz, Ihagee Dresden, and KW, among others), which would start the long line of Praktica cameras, high quality but affordable, in accordance with the Communist ideal. In all, 22 Contax/Pentacon models were built in Dresden.

== Yashica/Kyocera-licensed models ==
=== 35 mm SLR models ===
The Contax name was revived in 1975 (officially it was styled 'CONTAX' by Yashica/Kyocera, instead of 'Contax') after the production of the Contax rangefinder cameras ended in Stuttgart more than a decade before. Like the first attempt at forging an alliance with Pentax, Zeiss designed a new common lens mount, known as Contax/Yashica mount (C/Y) to be used on cameras bearing both marques. The first model, the Contax RTS (short for "Real Time System"), was designed by Prof. Dr. Katsuiko Sugaya, styled by the Porsche Design studio, and manufactured by Yashica as Top Secret Project 130. Featuring comprehensive use of electronics, it was the beginning of the new Contax line of SLR cameras which brought 13 different models, with the exception of the S2 and S2b (named as a spiritual successor to the original Dresden-built camera) being fully mechanical. The following is a brief rundown of the major models:

Model	Year	main features
RTS	1974	professional quality SLR with fixed pentaprism and electronically controlled shutter
139 Q	1979	aperture priority, TTL and TTL flash metering, X-synch 1/100
137 MD	1980	aperture priority, motor film transport (2–3 frame/s)
RTS II	1982	TTL flash metering, titanium shutter, digital viewfinder displays for aperture, shutter speed and exposure compensation
137 MA	1981	aperture priority and manual modes
159 MM	1984	program and aperture priority modes, 1/4000 sec, X-sync 1/250 sec, improved MM bayonet mount
167 MT	1986	program, shutter and aperture priority, and manual modes, spot metering, permanent AE-lock, automatic bracketing
RTS III	1990	pre-flash TTL spot metering, ceramic vacuum film pressure plate, 100% viewfinder
ST	1992	1/6000 sec, X-synch 1/200, center weighted or spot metering
S2	1992	1/4000 sec mechanical shutter, spot metering, no TTL flash metering
S2b	1994	1/4000 sec mechanical shutter, center weighted metering, no TTL flash metering
RX	1994	focus assist system
AX	1996	autofocus with moving film plane
Aria	1998	matrix metering
RX II	2002	simpler version of the RX (without focus assistance)

Some special models were also made, for example

- Contax RTS Fundus – usually marked 'Medical/Scientific' on the base plate it featured a 3mm high guard around the shutter release and a lock button on the front plate for the shutter speed dial. Several of these also had enhanced mirror dampers; most RTS Fundus cameras were sold for laboratory use, especially with Zeiss ophthalmic equipment.
- Contax Preview – a non-metered body with the mechanical shutter from the Yashica FX-3, a Polaroid Back and a Right-Angle Finder to correct the reversed image.
- Contax CGCM – a severely stripped down 137MD used by the Swedish military and for recording images from oscilloscopes and similar screens.
- Contax Preview II – an upgraded and faster mechanical shutter than the Preview; it used the shutter found in the S2/S2b.
- Yashica Dental Eye III - a fully automatic, fixed lens single lens reflex dental camera made for intraoral photography and based on the Contax RX. Features a 100mm f/4 lens with integrated flash.

Some additional information

- Contax AX – This had a unique autofocus system that worked with manual focus lenses by moving the film plane inside the camera. A side benefit of this arrangement is that it allowed the AX to feature a macro mode which worked much like a built-in 10 mm extension tube, allowing for a magnification ratio higher than 1:1 without the use of bellows or extension tubes. By using of a special adaptor made by Kyocera, Hasselblad V-series lenses could also be used on all Contax C/Y mount cameras. Thus users could perform auto-focus of Hasselblad V-series lenses with AX.
- The S2 and S2b were deliberately designed without exposure automation, and required a battery only for the light metering system. The S2 had a spot meter, and was popular with some Zone System photographers, while the S2b had a centerweighted meter favored by some photojournalists.
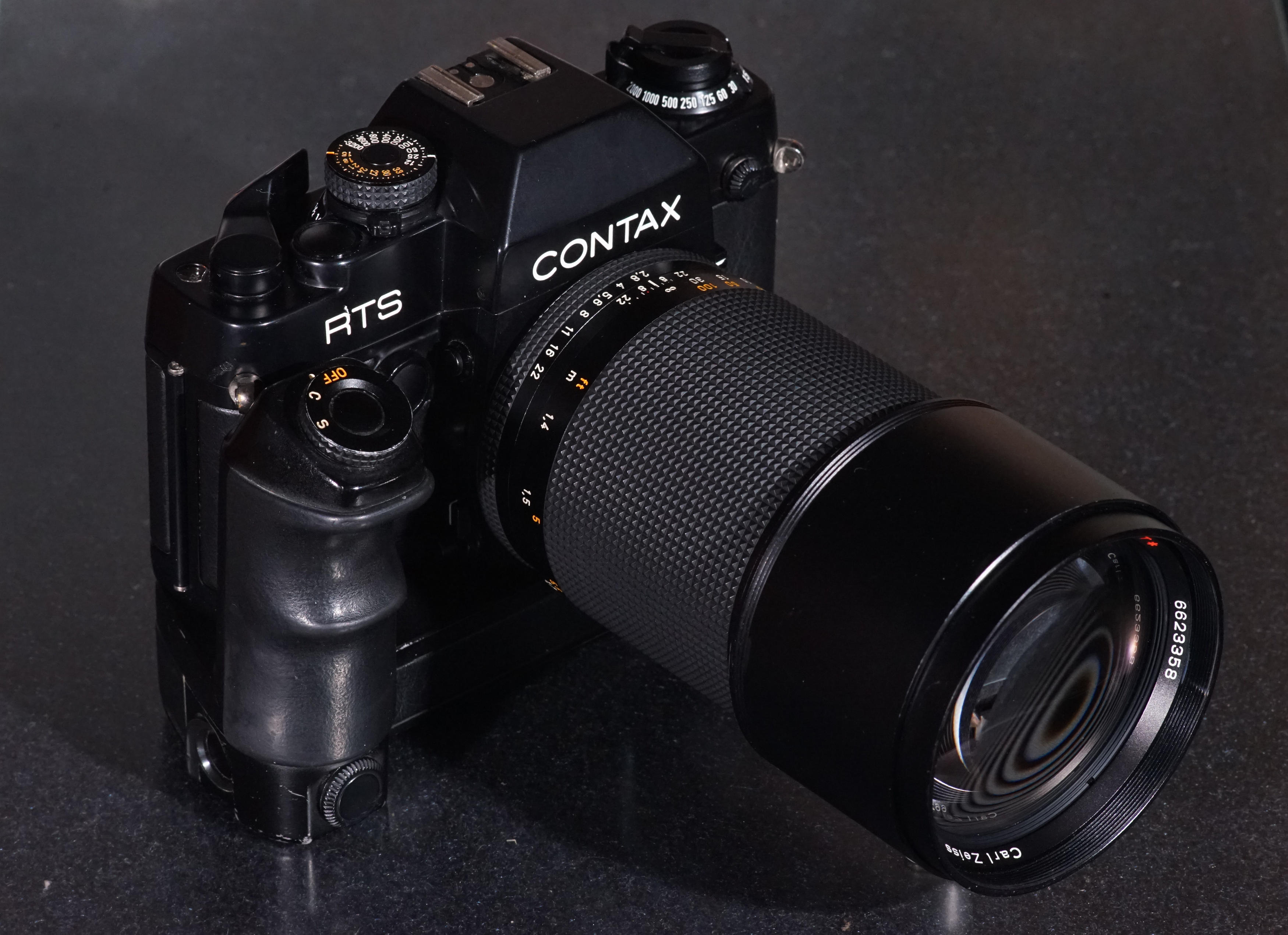
Contax RTS II Quartz with Sonnar T* f2,8 180 mm

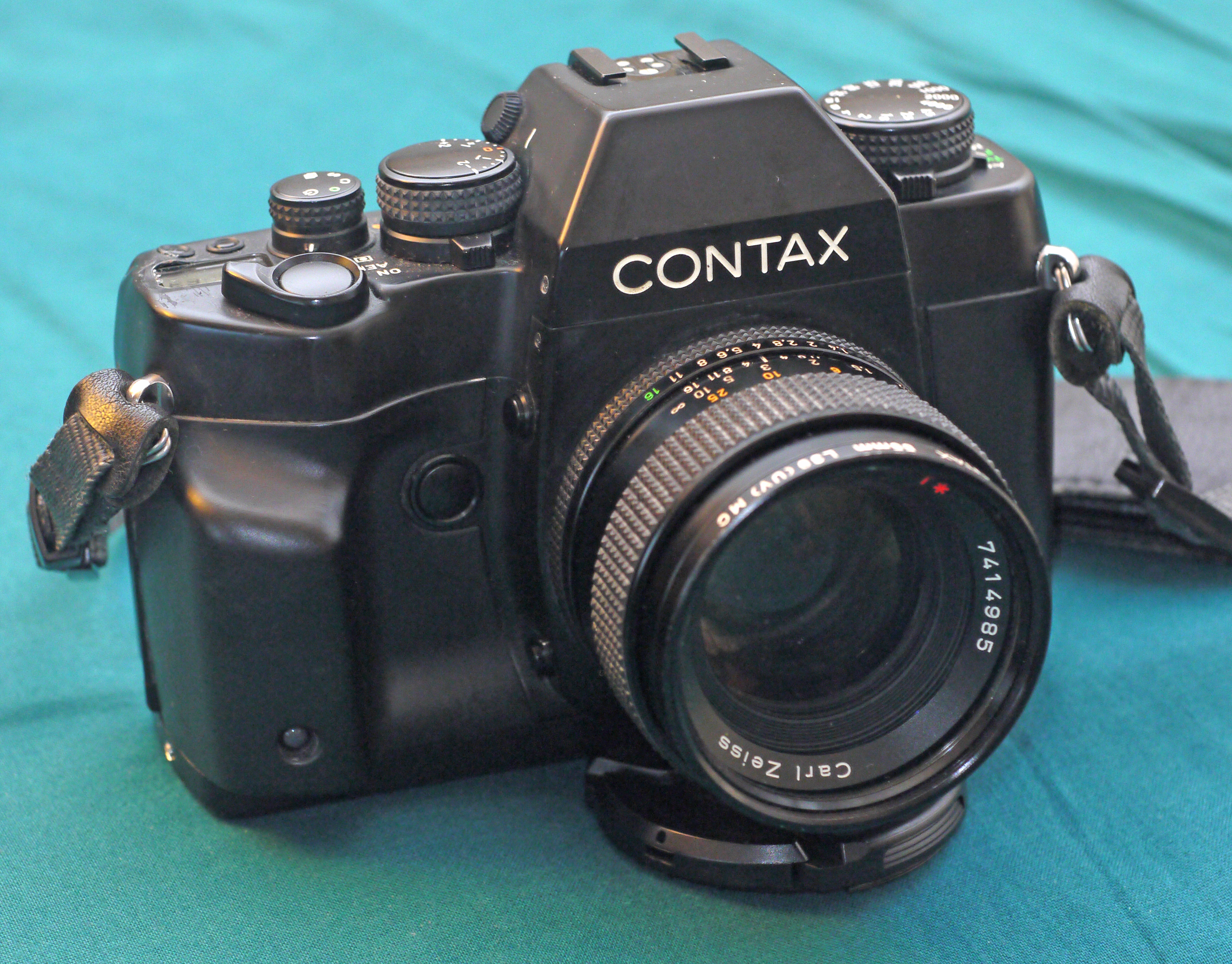
Contax RTS III with Planar T* f1,4 50 mm

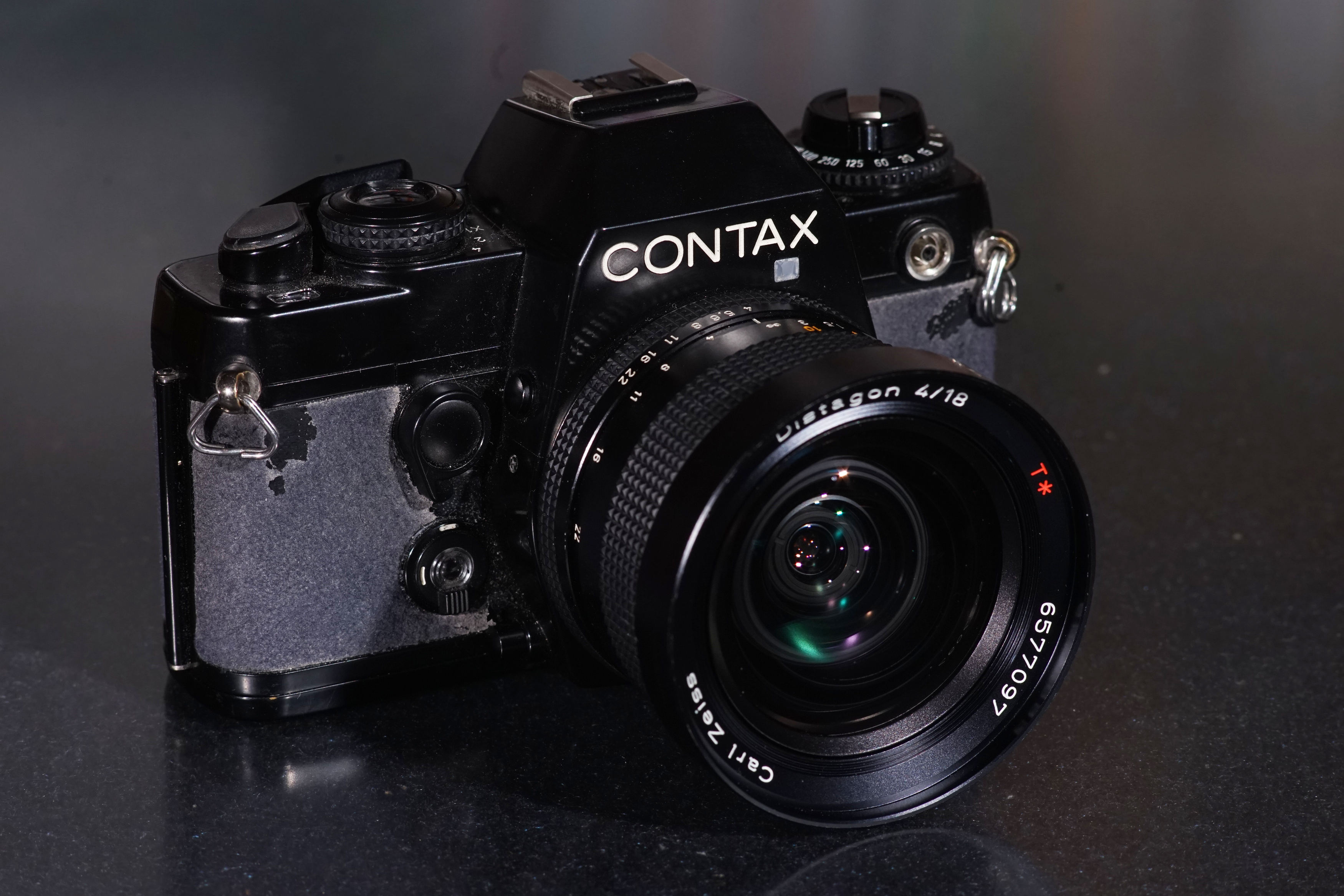
Contax 139 Quartz with Distagon T* f4,0 18 mm

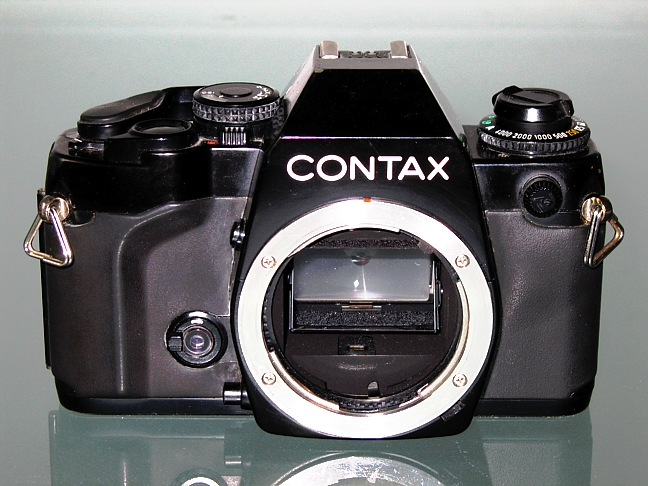
Contax 159MM body

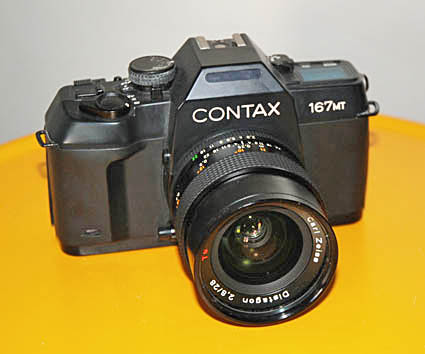
Contax 167MT with Distagon T* f2,8 28 mm

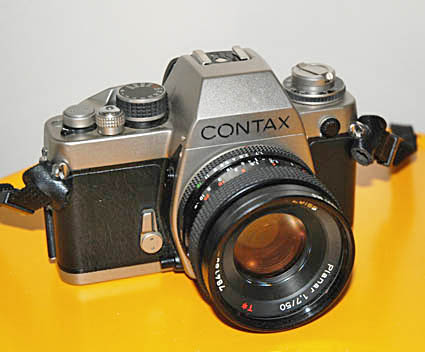
Contax S2 with Planar T* f1,7 50 mm

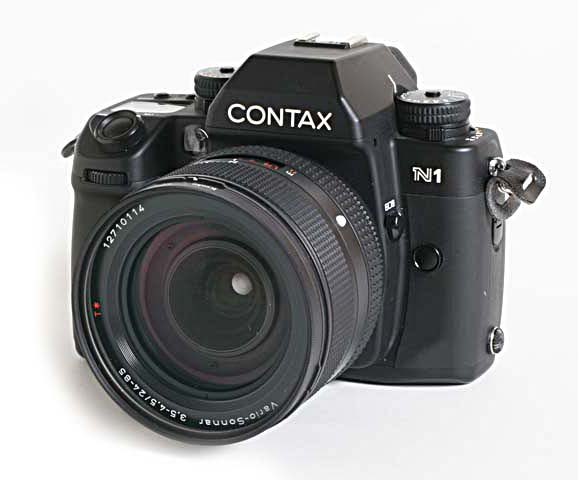
Contax N1 with Vario-Sonner 1:3.5-4.5/24-85 made by Yashica-Kyocera

=== G series ===
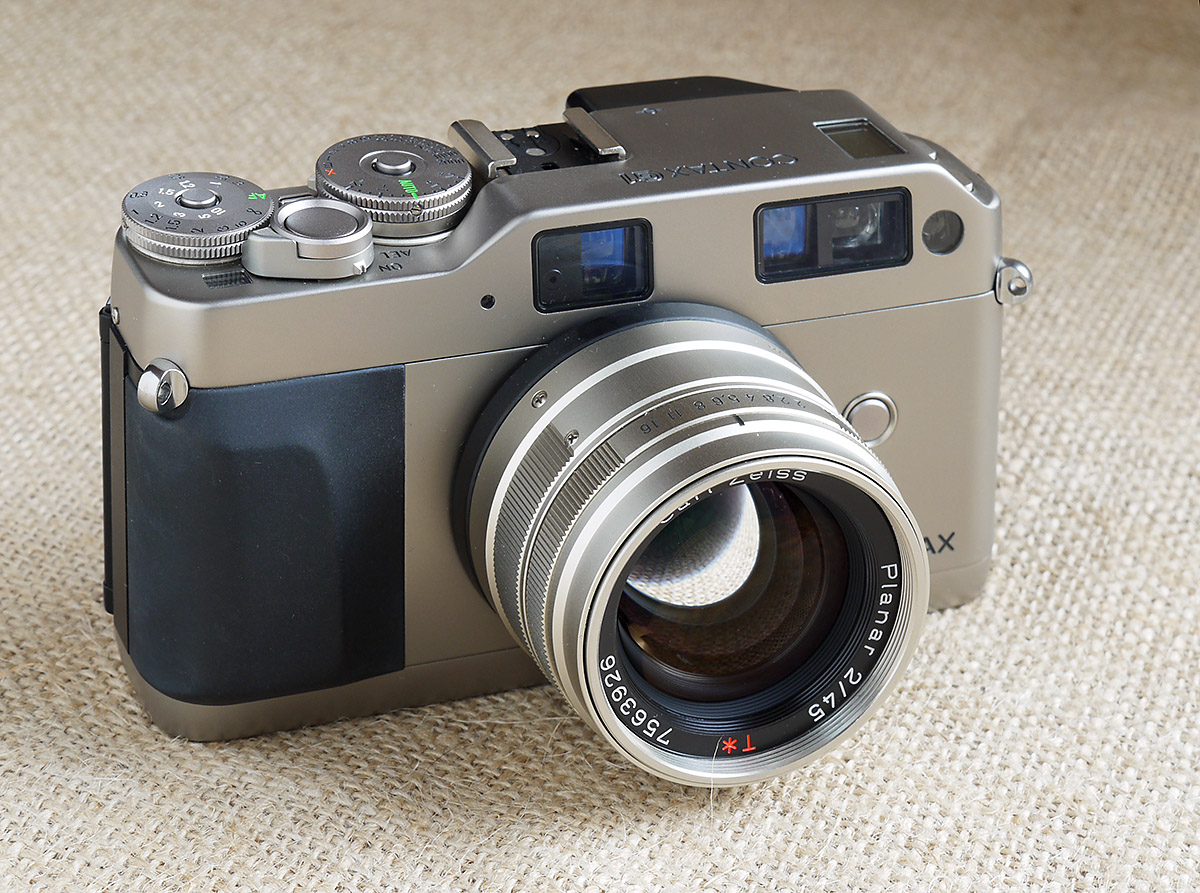
Contax G1 with Planar T* f2 45 mm

The G series was a unique 35 mm autofocus rangefinder system with interchangeable lenses. Rather than displaying a typical rangefinder focusing patch and brightlines, the first G1 had a zooming viewfinder with a focus confirmation light activated by the autofocus system if manual focus was required. The actual AF system, unlike AF for SLR cameras, used a twin-window rangefinder, but the alignment determination was electronic.

The G2 was the second camera body in the series, and displayed manual focus distance directly on a viewfinder LCD. The G2 was generally considered more rugged and controllable than the earlier G1. Another improvement over the G1 was its full parallax correction viewfinder. A limited edition run of black G2 bodies and lenses were produced, differing from the standard titanium finish found on the original G1 and G2.

The lenses used optical formulae not often used by Zeiss, which had specialized in SLR photographic lenses for many decades prior to the G Series. (These formulae appear to be repeated in the later Zeiss Ikon M-mount rangefinder cameras.) The G series also boasted the only true zoom available for a rangefinder system, made possible by the mechanical coupling of the camera's viewfinder and the lens.

=== T-series compact cameras ===
Kyocera introduced a series of highly successful T-series compact cameras, offering Zeiss-designed lenses which appealed to photographers desiring high quality optics in a compact form.

They were introduced between 1984 and 2002, have Carl Zeiss Sonnar T* lenses and a titanium body. The T and T2 have a fixed 38 mm wide-angle Sonnar lens (5 elements in 4 groups), while the T3 uses a redesigned 35mm Sonnar lens (6 elements in 5 groups). The T-VS and T-VS II use a 28–56 mm Vario-Sonnar lens (where the "VS" in T-VS comes from), while the T-VS III has a 30–60 mm Vario-Sonnar lens. All analog T and T-VS cameras use 35 mm film. The Tix uses APS film and has a fixed 28 mm wide-angle lens.

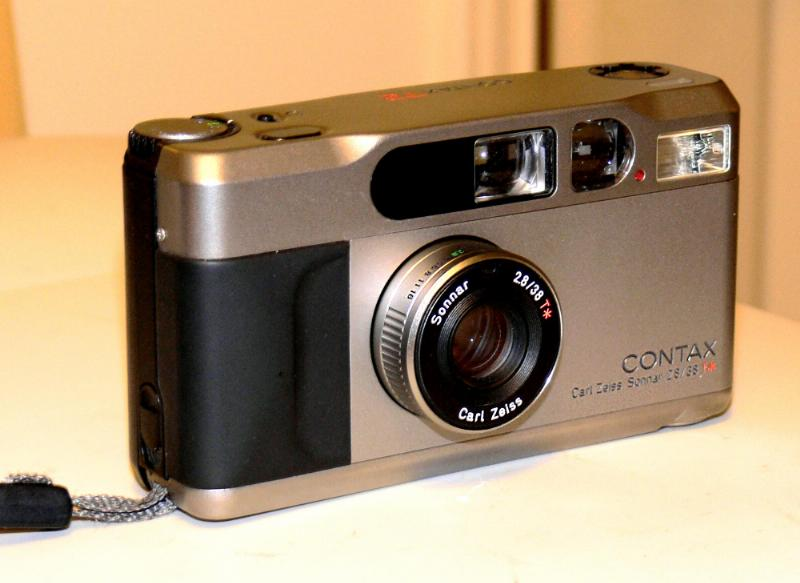
Contax T2, silver titanium finish

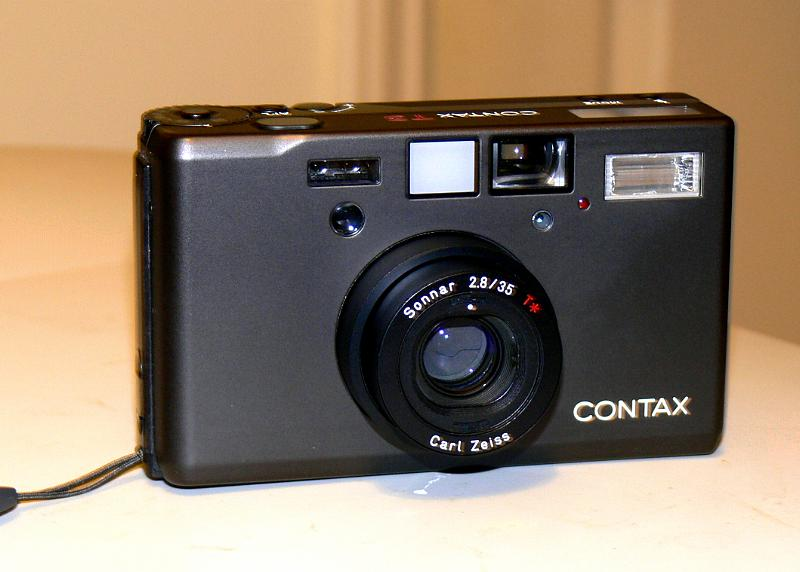
Contax T3, black titanium finish

=== Compact digital cameras ===
- Contax T-VS digital, the digital version of T-VS III with a Carl Zeiss Vario Sonnar T✻ 2,8–4,8/7,3–21,9 mm and 5 megapixel CCD sensor
- Contax i4R, the smallest compact Contax, and the last camera from the Contax marque.
- Contax SL300R T✻ and later on U4R, compact cameras with a Carl Zeiss Vario Tessar zoom and a rotating screen. Although very compact and simple to use, the SL300RT✻ featured some manual settings including metering and focus lock
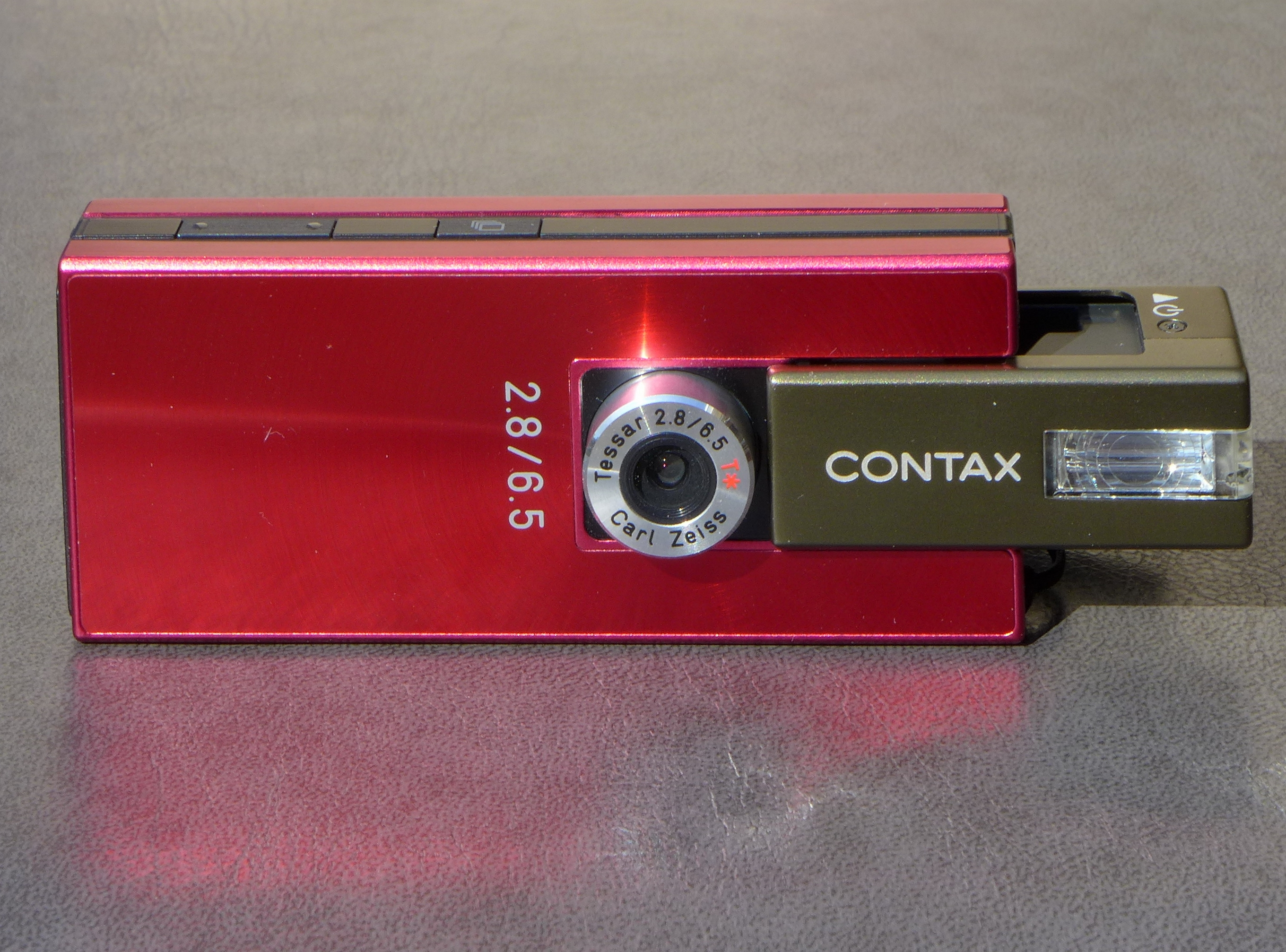
Contax i4R red version

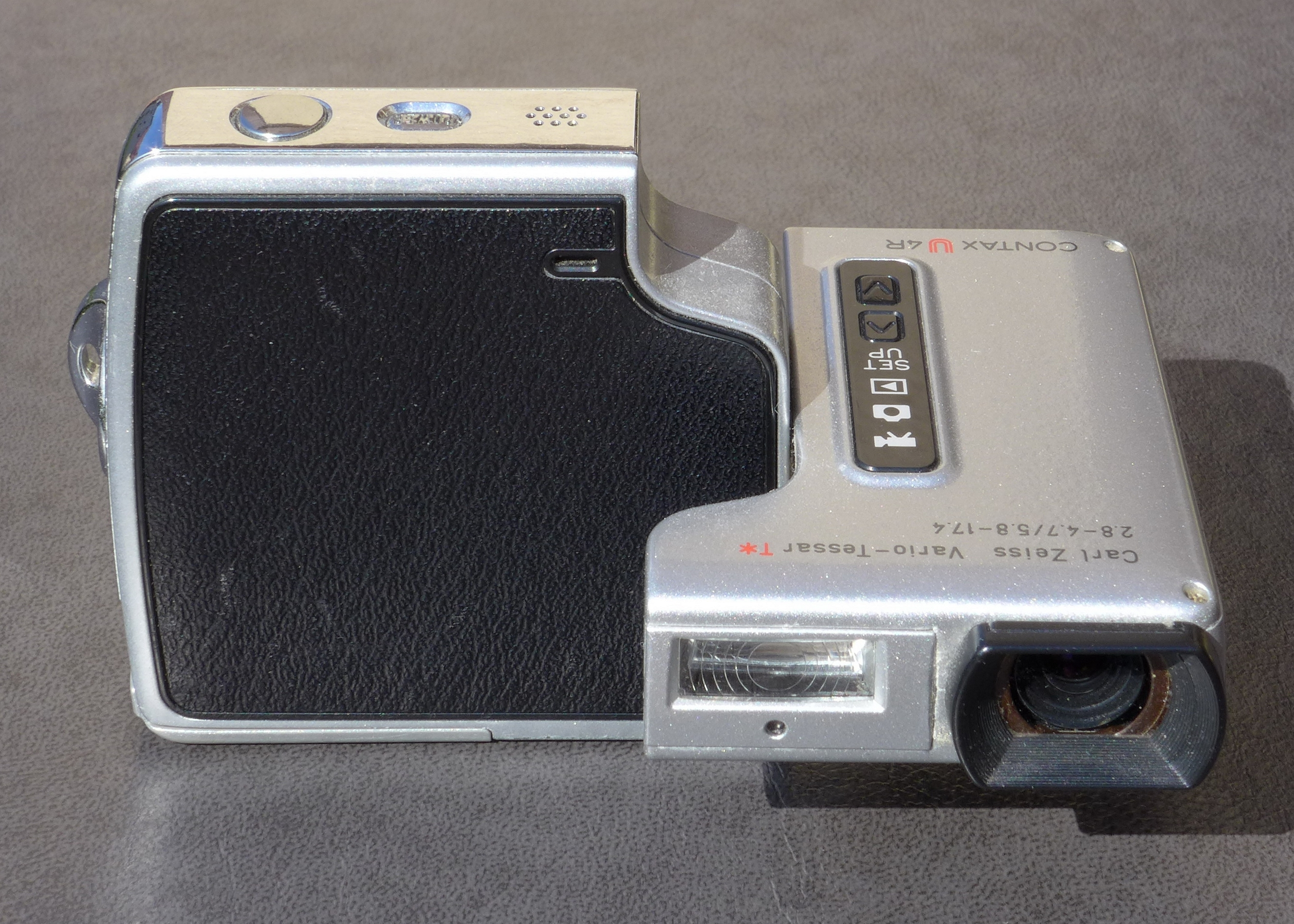
Contax U4R chrome-black

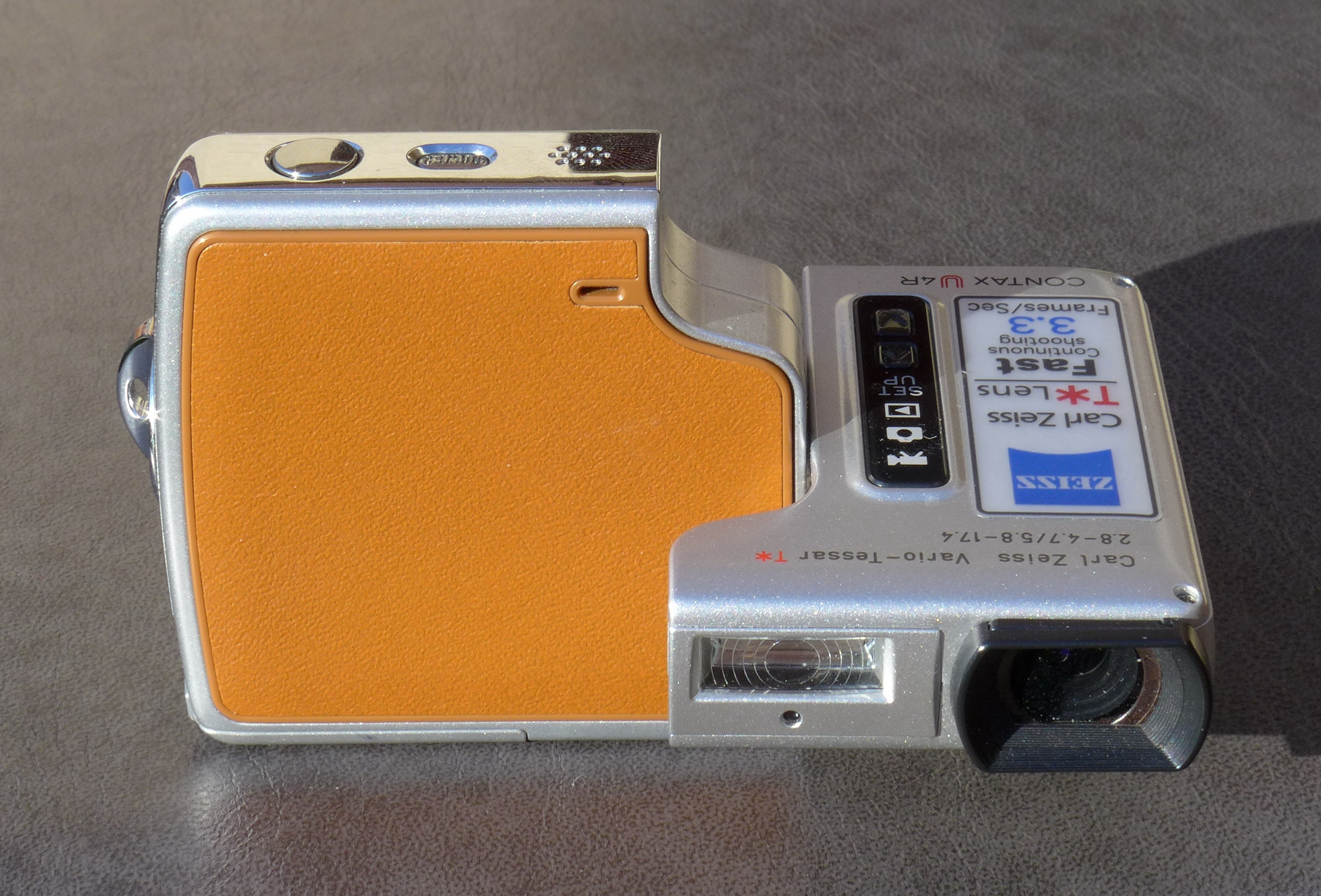
Contax U4R chrome-camel

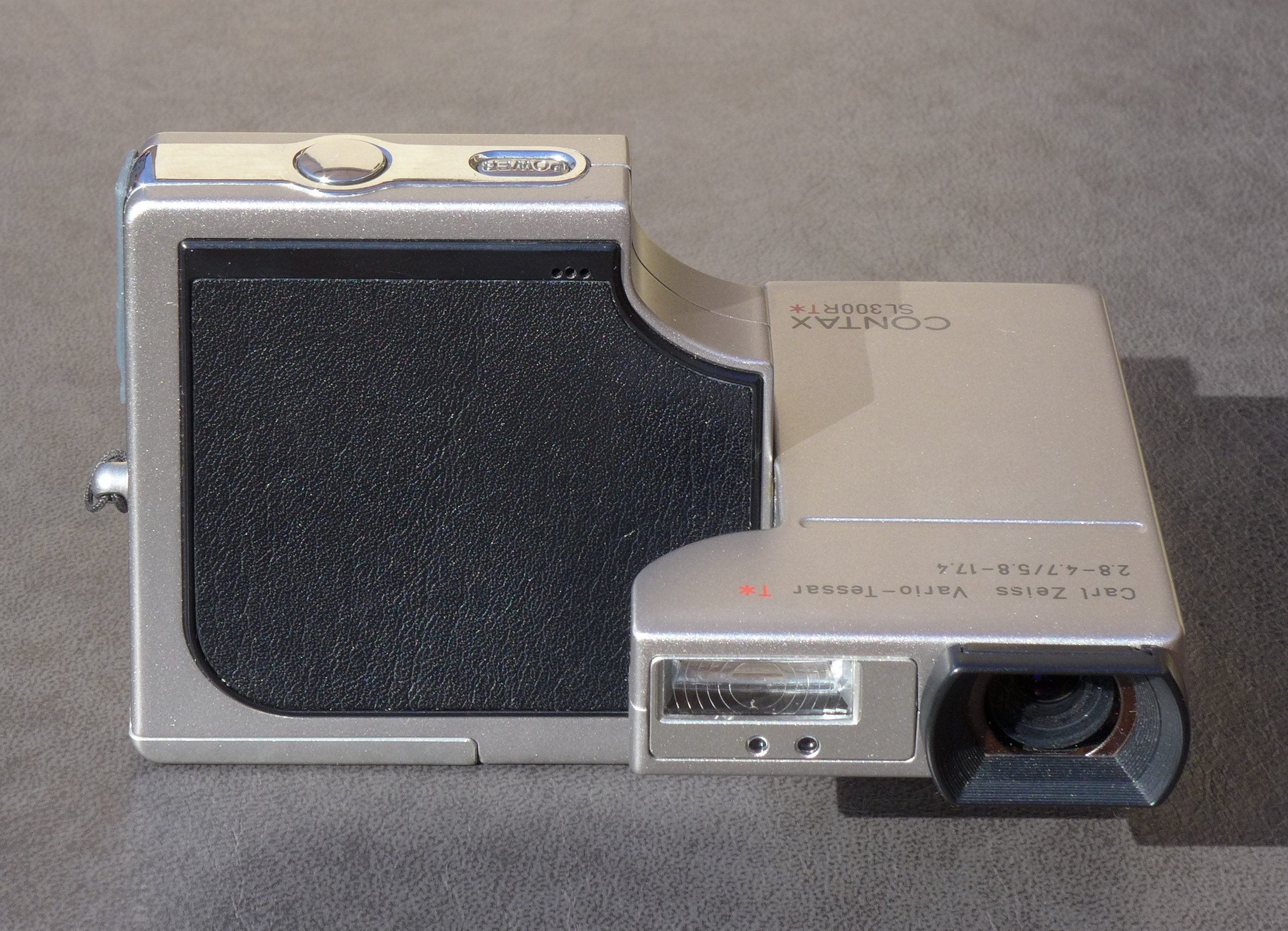
Contax SL300RT chrome

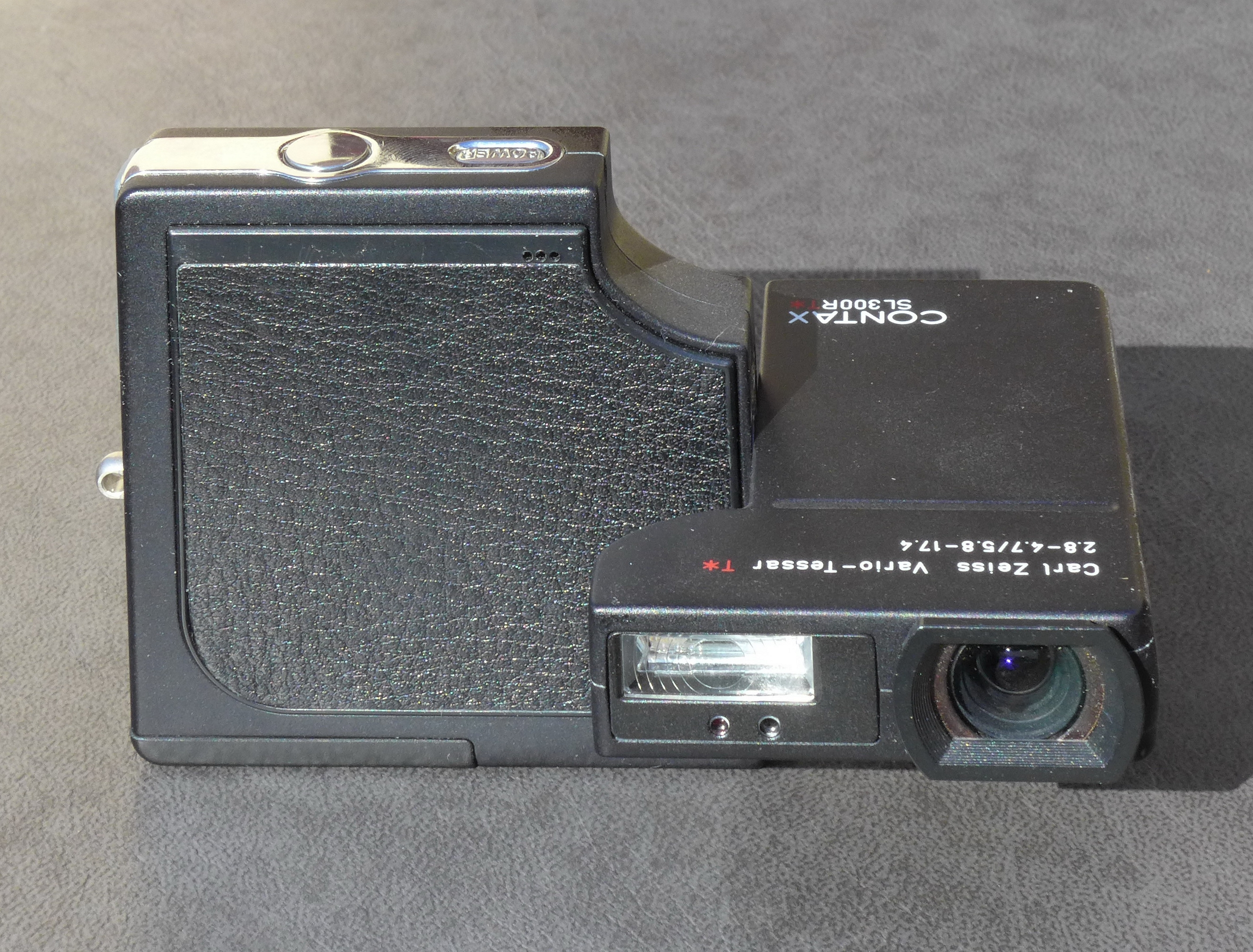
Contax SL300RT black

=== 645 ===
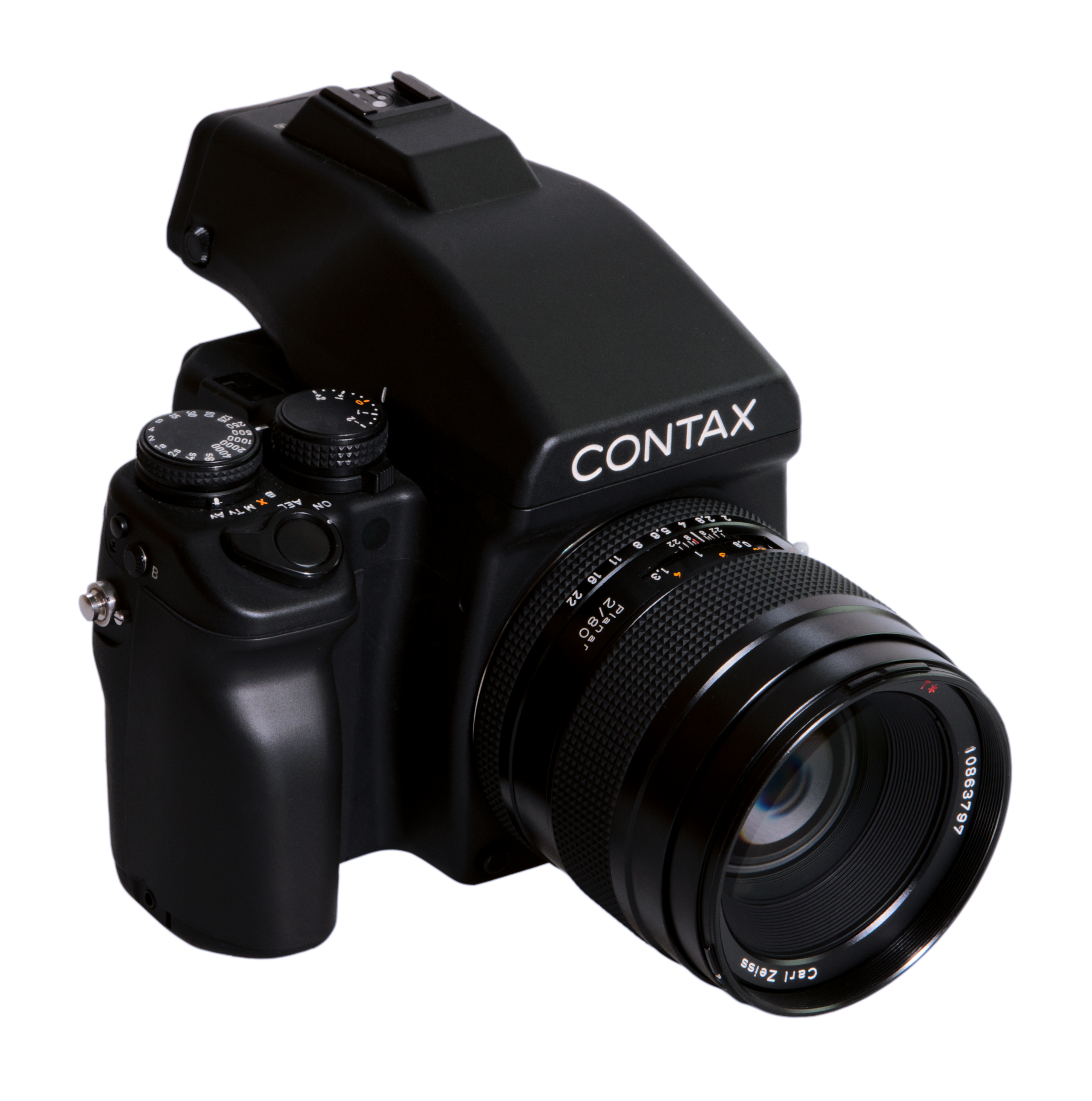
Contax 645

A departure from the 35 mm format, the Contax 645 was an autofocus medium format SLR system introduced in 1999, featuring an array of Zeiss lenses and interchangeable film and digital backs. One of its unique features was a 220 film back equipped with the vacuum system originally developed for the 35 mm RTSIII SLR, which was claimed to increase sharpness by keeping the film perfectly flat in the plane of focus. By using the adaptor 'MAM-1' produced by Contax, Hasselblad V-series lenses including C, CF, CFE, CFI, F and FE can be mounted on Contax 645 as well.

In addition to 120 and 220 medium format backs with film inserts for quick loading, including the previously mentioned vacuum back, as well as a Polaroid/instant film back, many manufacturers offer a variety of interchangeable digital backs for the Contax 645 system:

- Imacon
- Leaf
- Kodak
- Jenoptik
- Sinar-Bron
- Megavision
- Phase One

The following lenses were designed by Carl Zeiss for the Contax 645:

- Distagon 3,5/35 mm
- Distagon 2,8/45 mm
- Distagon 3,5/55 mm
- Planar 2/80 mm
- Apo-Makro-Planar 4/120 mm (1:1 magnification, manual focus)
- Sonnar 2,8/140 mm
- Sonnar 4/210 mm
- Tele-Apotessar 4/350 mm
- Vario-Sonnar 4,5/45–90 mm

=== N series ===
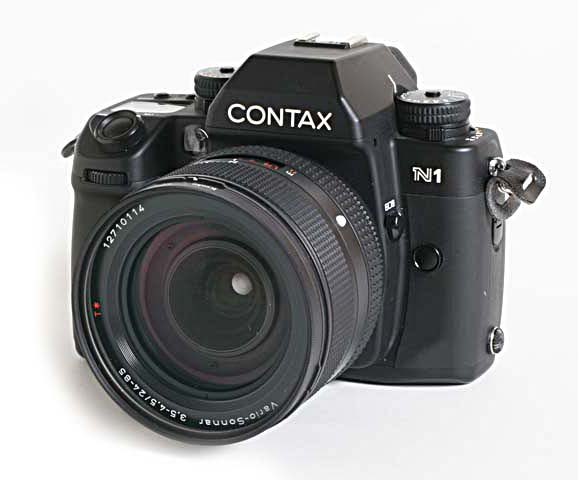
Contax N1

The Contax N series was an autofocus 35 mm SLR system, based around an entirely new electronic bayonet mount that was not compatible with previous Contax C/Y mount lenses. Three models were made: the N1, the NX and the N Digital, the first full-frame digital SLR.

The N Digital was one of the first digital cameras to feature a full-frame 24×36 mm CCD sensor. The Contax NX was the prosumer 35mm model for advanced-amateur photographers, while the N1 was aimed at professional users. The series was made in Japan by Kyocera.

The N-series bodies used new N-mount lenses made by Kyocera, with electronically controlled aperture and autofocus. Nine lenses were produced for the mount, a mixture of primes and zooms. Contax did sell an adapter (NAM-1) allowing lenses from their 645 medium format system to be used on N bodies.

=== Electronic flash units ===
Not all Contax flash units are compatible with all cameras. There are essentially three groups of flash guns; those made for the G system, those made for the early (Yashica made) SLRs and those for the later (Kyocera made) SLRs.

Flash units available included (GNs stated at ISO 100):

- TLA20 (GN 20)
- TLA30 (GN 30)
- TLA140 (GN 14) – Very compact unit originally designed for the G1
- TLA200 (GN 20) – Compact flash unit originally designed for the G Series.
- TLA280 (GN 28)
- TLA360 (GN 36) – Best used with optional PS-220 Power Pack Set for faster recycling.
- TLA480 (GN 48) – Bracket-mounted flash system requiring external Power Pack PS-120 for operation. Also available, though very rare, is a PS-130 TLA AC Power Unit (AC 100 V 50/60 Hz) for studio use.
- RTF540 (GN 40) – Bracket-mounted system with slaves, coloured panels, AC Power Unit, High Voltage Battery and standard Power Pack sets. There was a late modification to the RTF540 that changed its capability to include TLA functionality for use with later cameras, via the RTF540 TLA Adapter; this was the RTF540T and could be recognized by the addition of a symbol – the letter T in a circle – to the serial number plate beneath the flash head.

Metz SCA adapters:

- SCA3802
- SCA3801
- SCA382 – Worked with the older cameras, but did not transmit ASA and aperture information on the Contax 645, Aria, RX, AX N1, NX, and N digital cameras.

== Carl Zeiss interchangeable lenses for Contax cameras ==
Originally designed to be a system camera, many lenses were made for the original Contax, and this tradition carried on for all models with interchangeable lenses.

=== Lenses for the original rangefinder models ===
Traditionally, lens makers like to mark the location of the company conspicuously on their lenses. Therefore, from the beginning of lens manufacture up to the end of the Second World War, all Zeiss lenses were marked "Carl Zeiss Jena". Since the new Oberkochen-based Carl Zeiss Optical company is not in Jena, its products are simply marked "Carl Zeiss", while the original factory carried on using the "Carl Zeiss Jena" marking. For the first few years Carl Zeiss of Oberkochen used the "Zeiss-Opton" marking.

The original series of lenses for Contax were mainly new designs by Ludwig Bertele, under the Sonnar name which was previously used by Contessa-Nettel. These lenses were mainly advanced Unar/Protar derivatives of markedly asymmetrical designs, for the purpose of maintaining maximum image contrast by reducing lens flare before the era of anti-reflective surface coating, many of them also offering large maximum apertures as well. Apart from these, some existing designs were also adapted for use too.

The Contax I-III lenses were initially finished in black (for Contax I), but later in chrome (for Contax II and III), and offered in a wide range of focal lengths. These included the following:

- Tessar 80/2.8 (not rangefinder coupled)
- Biogon 35/2.8 (by Ludwig Bertele)
- Biotar 40/2.0
- Biotar 42.5/2.0
- Tessar 50/3.5
- Tessar 50/2.8
- Sonnar 50/2.0 (1931 by Ludwig Bertele)
- Sonnar 50/1.5 (1932 by Ludwig Bertele)
- Sonnar 85/2.0 (1932/33 by Ludwig Bertele)
- Triotar 85/4.0
- Sonnar 135/4.0 (1932/33 by Ludwig Bertele)
- Panflex Tessar 135/4.0 (ca. 200 made, about 10 lenses known to date, to be used with prewar Panflex)
- Tele-Tessar 180/6.3
- Sonnar 180/2.8 (1936 by Ludwig Bertele), often called "Olympia-Sonnar"
- Tele-Tessar 300/8.0
- Sonnar 300/4.0
- Fernobjektiv 500/8.0

One of the most important lenses for the Contax II and Contax III was the 180/2.8 Sonnar, designed for sports photographers covering the 1936 Berlin Olympics allowing fast speed, and the longest lenses also reached a focal length of 30 cm and 50 cm, delivered with their own mirror housing.

Zeiss developed also some experimental/prototype wide-angle lenses that never saw the market, because they were either 1) too expensive for production, 2) the market was not appropriate. 3) they were outcompeted by other lenses of the series. These were:

- Sphaerogon 19/8.0 (50 lenses made, only 2 survived so far)
- Perimetar 25/6.3 (50 lenses made, only 1 survived so far)
- Dagor 25/8.0 (2 lenses made, only 1 survived so far)
- Topogon 25/4.5 (50 lenses made, only 1 survived so far)

During the war, CZ (Zeiss) made some special Military lenses like Sonnar 1.5/9 cm, Sonnar 1.5/12.5 cm, Biotar 2.0/13 cm, 1,5/40 cm (project UHU), still very rare constructions. Kriegsmarine and Luftwaffe demanded CZ and CZ lenses for their Leicas and Robots too.

While Jena continued to make some lenses for the pre-war Contax for a few years, lenses were also made for the Stuttgart-built post-war models, some were of new designs:

- Topogon 25/4.0
- Biometar 35/2.8
- Tessar 50/3.5 collapsible mount
- Sonnar 50/2.0 rigid mount
- Sonnar 50/1.5 rigid mount
- Biotar 75/1.5
- Biometar 80/2.8 (only 5 lenses made in 1949)
- Sonnar 135/4.0
- Sonnar 180/2.8
- Sonnar 300/4.0
- Fernobjektiv 500/8.0

Apart from refining existing designs, Carl Zeiss of Oberkochen also designed new lenses for the post-war Contax IIa/IIIa too:

- Biogon 21/4.0 (1951 by Ludwig Bertele, later working at Wild Heerbrugg, Switzerland)
- Biogon 35/2,8 had to be redone to fit into the new IIa and IIIa cameras (smaller dark room due to thicker dural lamells in shutter)
- Planar 35/3.5
- Tessar 50/3.5 rigid mount
- Sonnar 50/2.0 rigid mount
- Sonnar 50/1.5 (multi coated)
- Sonnar 85/2.0 made in both aluminum and chrome mount
- Tessar 115/3.5 (Panflex-Tessar to be used with Panflex)
- Sonnar 135/4.0

=== Lenses for the Dresden-built SLR models ===
Lenses for the Dresden-built Contax single-lens reflex cameras used the M42X1mm screw mount, but as existing designs intruded too far into the camera body, making the swivelling mirror unable to clear the back of the lenses, a new series of lenses were made by Carl Zeiss of Jena, and later on, Hugo Meyer of Görlitz was also engaged as the second official supplier of original lenses. The following is a list of lenses made by Carl Zeiss:

- Tessar 40/4.5
- Tessar 50/3.5
- Biotar 58/2.0
- Biotar 75/1.5
- Triotar 135/4.0
- Sonnar 180/2.8
- Sonnar 300/4.0
- Fernobjektiv 500/8.0

=== Lenses for Yashica/Kyocera-built cameras ===
The Yashica/Kyocera-built Contax cameras employed a new family of lenses. The names of these lenses generally reflect the designs and functions:

- Distagon : wide-angle retrofocus lenses.
  - F-Distagon : fish-eye lenses.
  - PC-Distagon : wide-angle lenses with shift feature for correcting perspective convergence.
- Hologon and Biogon : non-retrofocus wide-angle lens designs.
- Planar : fixed focal length primes of very large maximum aperture that range from medium wide-angles to short telephotos.
- Sonnar and Tele-Tessar : telephoto lenses, and Tele-Apotessar and Aposonnar indicated apochromatic correction.
- Vario-Sonnar : zooms lenses.
- Makro-Sonnar and Makro-Planar : macro lenses for extreme close-up work, based on the Sonnar and Planar designs.
- Tessar : 4-element lenses of medium focal length, sometimes referred to as a "Normal" lens.
- Mutar : teleconverters.
- Mirotar : mirror lenses.

Most of these lenses were marked T✻ referring to their T✻ coating (pronounced "Tee Star"), a highly developed Zeiss multi-coating process. The 'T' came from a German word 'Tarnung', which means 'camouflaging', as in making invisible, used here in reference to making flare invisible.

While these lenses were designed by Zeiss and manufacture shared between Zeiss and Yashica's optical division Tomioka, Zeiss increasingly allowed Tomioka to take responsibility of their manufacture.

==== Lenses for 35 mm SLR models ====
These cameras used the "C/Y" lens mount, short for "Contax/Yashica": Yashica being the lower-end consumer brand SLR system made by Yashica/Kyocera that shared its lens mount with Contax SLRs. Zeiss lenses in the C/Y mount came in either AE or MM varieties. MM lenses were more recent, with a setting that allowed the camera to select the aperture as part of its autoexposure system, while the older AE lenses did not. There was often no difference between an older AE and a newer MM lens apart from this feature. Sometimes, the older AE lens may be worth more on the used market because it may be a Germany-made example, while the newer lens may be Japan-made, despite their optical formula and build quality being identical.

In addition, with the use of an optional adaptor (special ordered from Kyocera), Hasselblad V-series lenses including C, CF, CFE, CFI, F and FE can also be used on Contax C/Y mount cameras.

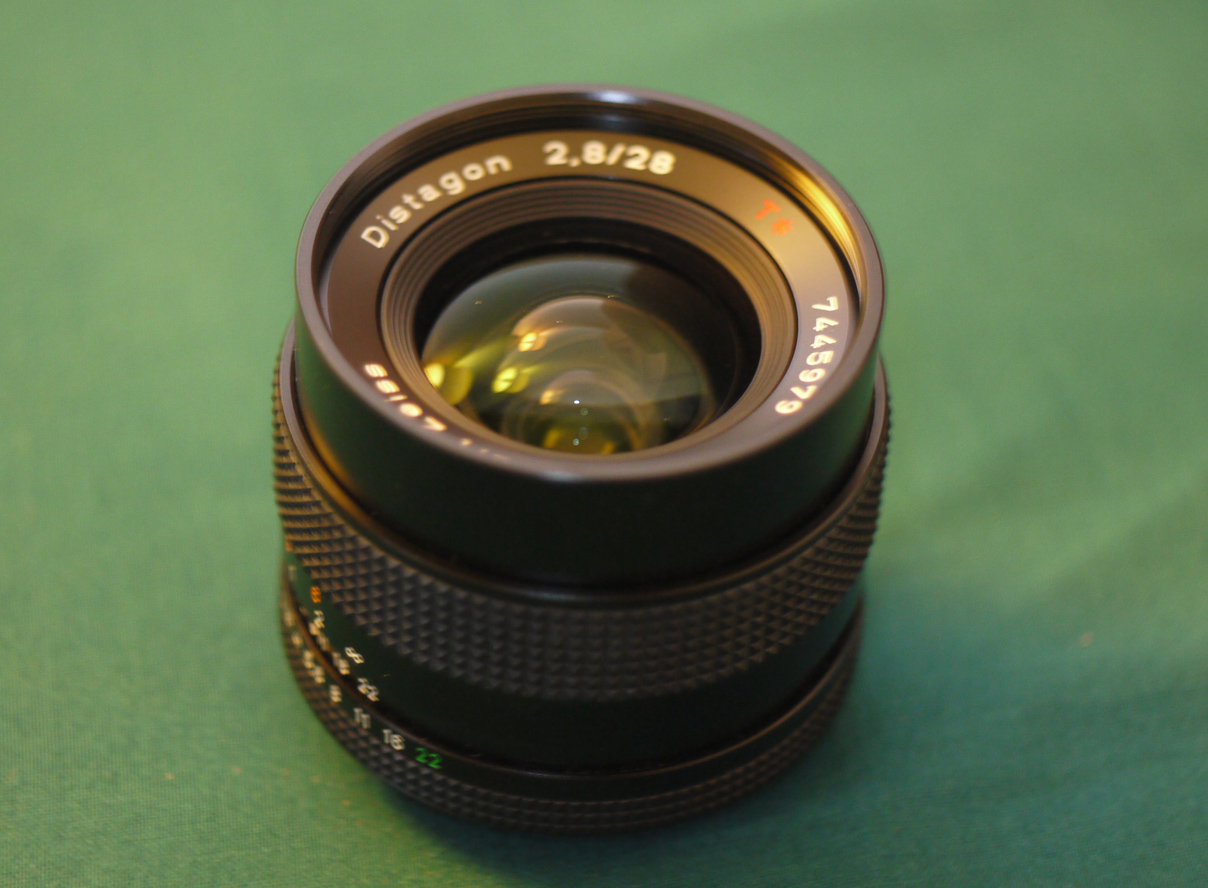
Distagon T✻ 28 mm f/2.8

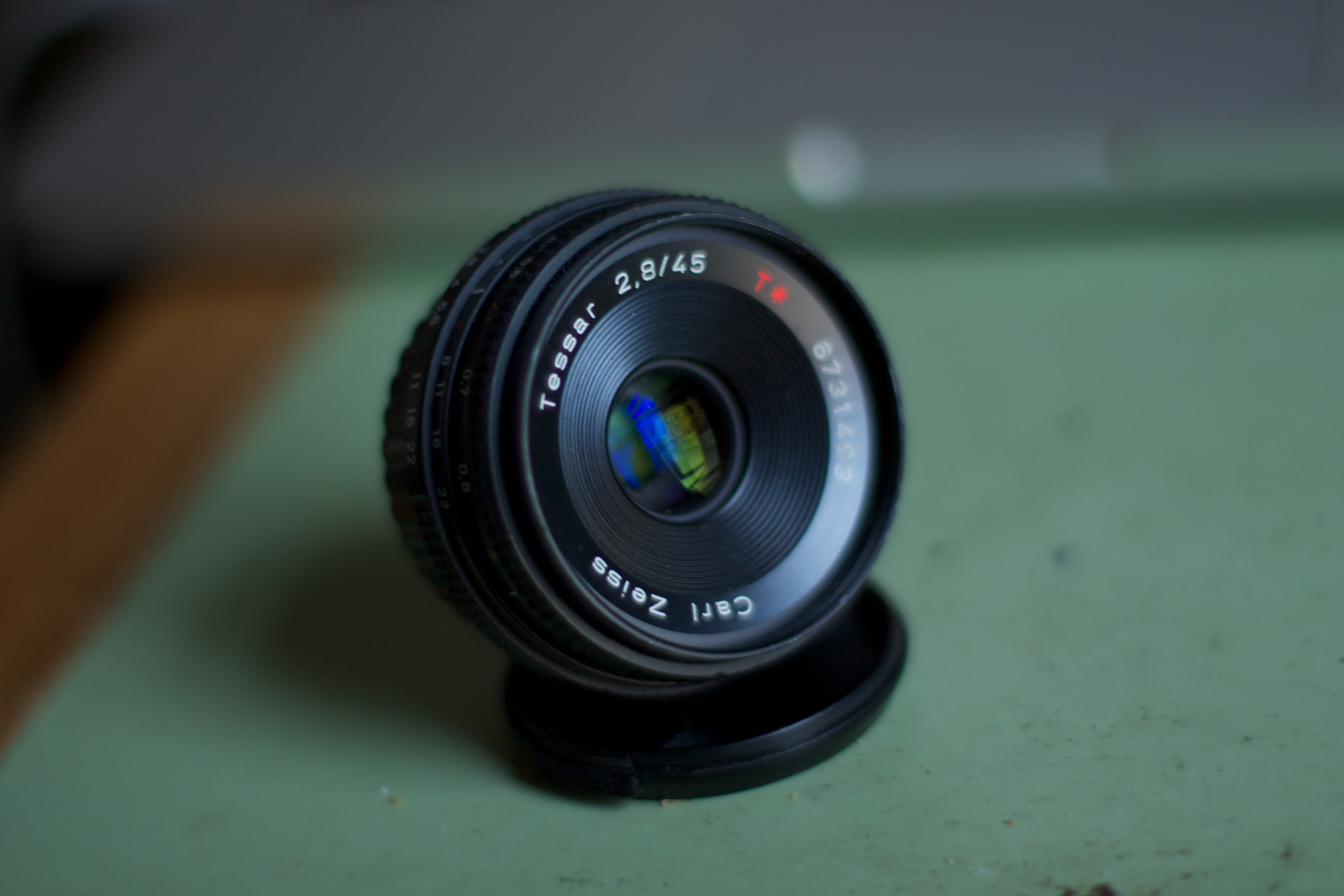
Tessar T✻ 45 mm f/2.8 (pancake)

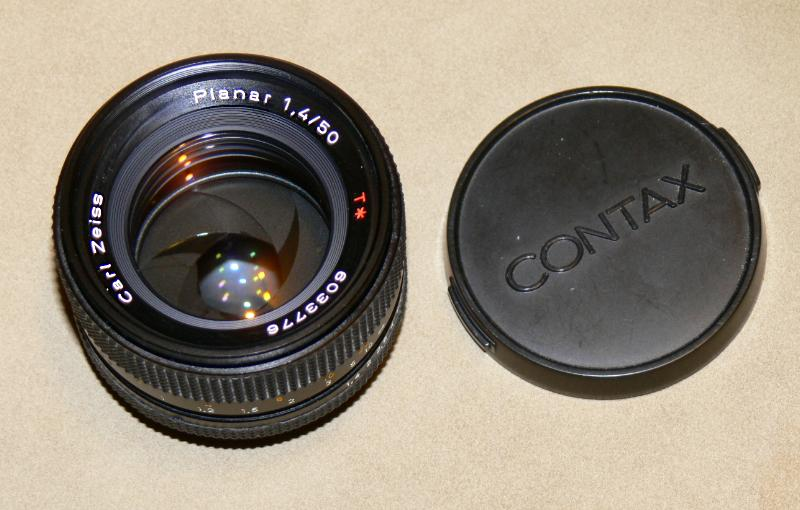
Planar T✻ 50 mm f/1.4

Interchangeable Carl Zeiss lenses for 35mm C/Y-mount cameras
FL (mm)	Apr.	Name	Construction		Min. Focus	Dimensions			Notes
FL (mm)	Apr.	Name	Ele	Grp	Min. Focus	Φ×L	Wgt.	Filter (mm)	Notes
Fisheye lenses
16	f/2.8–22	F-Distagon T*	8	7	0.3 m (1 ft 0 in)	70.0×61.5 mm (2.8×2.4 in)	460 g (16 oz)	built-in	full-frame fisheye lens
Ultra wide angle lenses
15	f/3.5–22	Distagon T*	13	12	0.16 m (6.3 in)	83.5×94.0 mm (3.3×3.7 in)	815 g (28.7 oz)	built-in	This model had also been ordered by both Leitz and Nikon and was adapted to be used on their own SLR cameras.
18	f/4–22	Distagon T*	10	9	0.3 m (1 ft 0 in)	70.0×51.5 mm (2.8×2.0 in)	350 g (12 oz)	86	
21	f/2.8–22	Distagon T*	15	13	0.22 m (8.7 in)	85.0×90.5 mm (3.3×3.6 in)	530 g (19 oz)	82	Noted for its unusual design and sharpness.
Wide angle lenses
25	f/2.8–22	Distagon T*	8	7	0.25 m (9.8 in)	62.5×56.0 mm (2.5×2.2 in)	360 g (13 oz)	55	The initial production was a failure due to image softness, not just wide open, and Zeiss discreetly and successfully re-engineered the lens and it remains highly sought after.
28	f/2–22	Distagon T*	9	8	0.24 m (9.4 in)	62.5×76.0 mm (2.5×3.0 in)	530 g (19 oz)	55	Noted for its lack of distortion. Nicknamed the "Hollywood" due to popularity for adaptation to movie cameras.
28	f/2.8–22	Distagon T*	7	7	0.25 m (9.8 in)	62.5×50.0 mm (2.5×2.0 in)	280 g (9.9 oz)	55	
35	f/1.4–16	Distagon T*	9	8	0.3 m (1 ft 0 in)	70.0×76.0 mm (2.8×3.0 in)	600 g (21 oz)	67	
35	f/2.8–22	Distagon T*	6	6	0.4 m (1 ft 4 in)	62.5×46.0 mm (2.5×1.8 in)	245 g (8.6 oz)	55	
35	f/2.8–22	PC–Distagon T*	9	9	0.3 m (1 ft 0 in)	70.0×85.5 mm (2.8×3.4 in)	725 g (25.6 oz)	86	Noted for its shift capabilities.
Normal lenses
45	f/2.8–22	Tessar T*	4	3	0.6 m (2 ft 0 in)	60.0×18.0 mm (2.4×0.7 in)	90 g (3.2 oz)	49	Noted for its unusual "pancake" design, being very thin and lightweight. Also released as a "100 years of Tessar design" Anniversary version, which is finished with titanium gold barrel similar to G-series lenses.
50	f/1.4–16	Planar T*	7	6	0.45 m (1 ft 6 in)	62.5×41.0 mm (2.5×1.6 in)	275 g (9.7 oz)	55	Also released in a gold plated version, included with the limited "Golden" Contax RTS camera.
50	f/1.7–16	Planar T*	7	6	0.6 m (2 ft 0 in)	61.0×36.5 mm (2.4×1.4 in)	190 g (6.7 oz)	55	Noted for its sharpness.
55	f/1.2–16	Planar T*	8	7	0.6 m (2 ft 0 in)	80.0×60.0 mm (3.1×2.4 in)	500 g (18 oz)	77	Limited edition anniversary lens to celebrate 100 years of Planar design Anniversary. A total of 1,000 were produced (Fabrikationsbuch Photooptik III, Carl Zeiss Oberkochen).
Portrait lenses
85	f/1.2–16	Planar T*	8	7	1.0 m (3 ft 3 in)	80.0×72.5 mm (3.1×2.9 in)	874 g (30.8 oz)	77	Produced as an anniversary lens in two batches. Contax 50 years Anniversary lens (AE type). A total of 1,500 were produced (Fabrikationsbuch Photooptik III, Carl Zeiss Oberkochen). Contax 60 years Anniversary lens (MM type). A total of 1,503 were produced (Fabrikationsbuch Photooptik III, Carl Zeiss Oberkochen).
85	f/1.4–16	Planar T*	6	5	1.0 m (3 ft 3 in)	70.0×64.0 mm (2.8×2.5 in)	595 g (21.0 oz)	67	
85	f/2.8–22	Sonnar T*	5	4	1.0 m (3 ft 3 in)	62.5×47.0 mm (2.5×1.9 in)	255 g (9.0 oz)	55	
100	f/2–22	Planar T*	6	5	1.0 m (3 ft 3 in)	70.0×84.0 mm (2.8×3.3 in)	670 g (24 oz)	67	
100	f/3.5–22	Sonnar T*	5	4	1.0 m (3 ft 3 in)	61.0×61.0 mm (2.4×2.4 in)	285 g (10.1 oz)	55	
135	f/2–22	Planar T*	5	5	1.5 m (4 ft 11 in)	75.0×101 mm (3.0×4.0 in)	830 g (29 oz)	72	Standard AE type lenses. Also available as a Contax 60 years anniversary version (MM type).
135	f/2.8–22	Sonnar T*	5	4	1.6 m (5 ft 3 in)	68.5×93.0 mm (2.7×3.7 in)	585 g (20.6 oz)	55	
Telephoto lenses
180	f/2.8–22	Sonnar T*	6	5	1.4 m (4 ft 7 in)	78.0×131 mm (3.1×5.2 in)	815 g (28.7 oz)	72	
200	f/2–22	Aposonnar T*	10	8	1.8 m (5 ft 11 in)	120×182 mm (4.7×7.2 in)	2.69 kg (5.9 lb)	drop-in	Noted for its unusually high speed and an iris with extra blades for smoother bokeh and rounder highlights, designed for portrait and fashion work. It came with a set of drop-in filters.
200	f/3.5–22	Tele-Tessar T*	6	5	1.8 m (5 ft 11 in)	77.5×121.5 mm (3.1×4.8 in)	750 g (26 oz)	67	
200	f/4–22	Tele-Tessar T*	6	5	1.5 m (4 ft 11 in)	66.5×122 mm (2.6×4.8 in)	550 g (19 oz)	55	
300	f/2.8–22	Tele-Apotessar T*	7	6	3.5 m (11 ft)	120×244 mm (4.7×9.6 in)	2.73 kg (6.0 lb)	drop-in	Noted for its sharpness and stratospheric price.
300	f/4–32	Tele-Tessar T*	5	5	3.5 m (11 ft)	88.0×205 mm (3.5×8.1 in)	1,200 g (42 oz)	82	
500	f/5.6–45	Tele-Apotessar T*	9	7	4.9 m (16 ft)	112×290 mm (4.4×11.4 in)	1,865 g (65.8 oz)	drop-in	
800	f/8–45	Tele-Apotessar T*	8	6	4.0 m (13.1 ft)	128.5×505 mm (5.1×19.9 in)	3.25 kg (7.2 lb)	drop-in	
Catadioptric lenses
250	f/1.5 (f/0.03 equiv.)	N-Mirotar	4	4	20 m (66 ft)	90×365 mm (3.5×14.4 in)	2.17 kg (4.8 lb)	—N/a	A smaller catadioptric lens with a built-in image intensifier which amplifies light by 2,500×, equivalent to 11 stops beyond f/1.4. According to some open sources, there were only 43 made.
500	f/4.5	Mirotar	5	5	3.5 m (11 ft)	151×225 mm (5.9×8.9 in)	4.5 kg (9.9 lb)	turret	Mirror lens developed in the Contarex era. A special ordered item from Zeiss Germany.
500	f/8	Mirotar	6	4	3.5 m (11 ft)	88×113.5 mm (3.5×4.5 in)	802 g (28.3 oz)	82	
1000	f/5.6	Mirotar	5	5	12 m (39 ft)	250×470 mm (9.8×18.5 in)	16.5 kg (36 lb)	turret	Mirror lens developed in the Contarex era. A special ordered item from Zeiss Germany.
Zoom lenses
28~70	f/3.5~4.5–22	Vario-Sonnar T*	9	8	0.4–0.5 m (1 ft 4 in – 1 ft 8 in)	70.0×68.0 mm (2.8×2.7 in)	320 g (11 oz)	67	
28~85	f/3.3~4.0–22	Vario-Sonnar T*	16	13	0.6 m (2 ft 0 in)	85.0×98.0 mm (3.3×3.9 in)	735 g (25.9 oz)	82	
35~70	f/3.4–22	Vario-Sonnar T*	10	10	0.7 m (2 ft 4 in)	70.0×80.5 mm (2.8×3.2 in)	475 g (16.8 oz)	67	
35~135	f/3.3~4.5–22	Vario-Sonnar T*	16	15	1.2 m (3 ft 11 in)	85.0×106.5 mm (3.3×4.2 in)	860 g (30 oz)	82	
40~80	f/3.5–22	Vario-Sonnar T*	13	9	1.2 m (3 ft 11 in)	67.0×87.0 mm (2.6×3.4 in)	605 g (21.3 oz)	55	One of the two Germany-made zoom lens in the C/Y history.
70~210	f/3.5–22	Vario-Sonnar T*	15	12	1.8 m (5 ft 11 in)	77.0×186 mm (3.0×7.3 in)	1,145 g (40.4 oz)	67	One of the two Germany-made zoom lens in the C/Y history.
80~200	f/4–22	Vario-Sonnar T*	13	10	1.0 m (3 ft 3 in)	67.0×160 mm (2.6×6.3 in)	680 g (24 oz)	55	
100~300	f/4.5~5.6–22	Vario-Sonnar T*	12	7	1.5 m (4 ft 11 in)	70.0×143 mm (2.8×5.6 in)	925 g (32.6 oz)	67	
Macro lenses
60	f/2.8–22	S-Planar T*	6	4	0.24 m (9.4 in)	75.5×74.0 mm (3.0×2.9 in)	570 g (20 oz)	67	The former type of Makro-Planar T* 60 mm f/2.8 which having the same lens design each other.
60	f/2.8–22	Makro-Planar T*	6	4	0.24 m (9.4 in)	75.5×74.0 mm (3.0×2.9 in)	570 g (20 oz)	67	
60	f/2.8–22	Makro-Planar T* C	6	4	0.24 m (9.4 in)	64.5×51.5 mm (2.5×2.0 in)	270 g (9.5 oz)	55	Same optical design as Makro-Planar T* 60/2.8, but packed in a smaller barrel which offers magnification ratio 1:2
100	f/2.8–22	Makro-Planar T*	7	7	0.45 m (1 ft 6 in)	76.4×86.8 mm (3.0×3.4 in)	740 g (26 oz)	67	
100	f/4–32	S-Planar T*	6	4	1.4× mag.	62.5×48.5 mm (2.5×1.9 in)	285 g (10.1 oz)	55	Macro lens for using with bellows.
Teleconverters
1.4×	1.4×	Mutar III T*	6	4	—N/a	59.5×22.4 mm (2.3×0.9 in)	245 g (8.6 oz)	—N/a	
2×	2×	Mutar I T*	6	5	—N/a	64.5×37.7 mm (2.5×1.5 in)	250 g (8.8 oz)	—N/a	
2×	2×	Mutar II T*	7	4	—N/a	64.5×51.0 mm (2.5×2.0 in)	300 g (11 oz)	—N/a	High quality, designed to mate with long telephotos.

Some of the special and prototype lenses include:

- PC-ApoDistagon T* 25/1.4 – Prototype only.
- Makro-Planar T* 60/2.8 – Offers a higher magnification ratio (1:1) than the other MM macro lenses.
- Tele-Apotessar T* 600/4 AE – Prototype only but several were manufactured; it was partnered with a bespoke 1.4x Tele-converter.

==== Lenses for G-series ====
G-series Contax models used a unique bayonet mount offering auto-focus coupling mechanism. Noted Hologon was the only manual-focus lens and the only Germany-made lens in the lineup. Also, apart from Hologon, all lenses were available in both Gold Titanium (standard) and Black (limited) colors.

Interchangeable Carl Zeiss lenses for Contax G cameras
FL (mm)	Apr.	Name	Construction		Min. Focus	Dimensions			Notes
FL (mm)	Apr.	Name	Ele	Grp	Min. Focus	Φ×L	Wgt.	Filter (mm)	Notes
Ultra wide angle lenses
16	f/8	Hologon T*	5	3	0.3 m (1 ft 0 in)	53.0×11.0 mm (2.1×0.4 in)	120 g (4.2 oz)	special bayonet	Came with an optical viewfinder, a case and a center filter to reduce vignetting. Noted for its extremely low distortion. it was produced in Germany.
21	f/2.8–22	Biogon T*	9	7	0.5 m (1 ft 8 in)	59.0×35.0 mm (2.3×1.4 in)	200 g (7.1 oz)	55	Came with an optical viewfinder and a case.
Wide angle lenses
28	f/2.8–22	Biogon T*	7	5	0.5 m (1 ft 8 in)	56.0×31.0 mm (2.2×1.2 in)	150 g (5.3 oz)	46	
35	f/2–16	Planar T*	7	5	0.5 m (1 ft 8 in)	56.0×29.0 mm (2.2×1.1 in)	160 g (5.6 oz)	46	
Normal lenses
45	f/2–16	Planar T*	6	4	0.5 m (1 ft 8 in)	56.0×39.0 mm (2.2×1.5 in)	190 g (6.7 oz)	46	Noted at the time of its release as the sharpest available lens for 35 mm photography
Portrait lenses
90	f/2.8–22	Sonnar T*	5	4	1.0 m (3 ft 3 in)	56.0×63.0 mm (2.2×2.5 in)	240 g (8.5 oz)	46	
Zoom lenses
35~70	f/3.5~5.6–22	Vario-Sonnar T*	13	8	1.0 m (3 ft 3 in)	59.0×54.0 mm (2.3×2.1 in)	290 g (10 oz)	46	

==== Lenses for 645 ====
The following lenses were made for the Contax 645 systems which offered auto-focus function (apart from A-M-P 120/4 which was a manual-focus lens). Additionally, with the use of MAM-1 adaptor, Hasselblad V-series lenses including C, CF, CFE, CFI, F and FE can be used (manual-focus) as well.

Interchangeable Carl Zeiss lenses for Contax 645 cameras
FL (mm)	Apr.	Name	Construction		Min. Focus	Dimensions			Notes
FL (mm)	Apr.	Name	Ele	Grp	Min. Focus	Φ×L	Wgt.	Filter (mm)	Notes
Ultra wide angle lenses
35	f/3.5–32	Distagon T*	11	8	0.5 m (1 ft 8 in)	102×108 mm (4.0×4.3 in)	877 g (30.9 oz)	95	
Wide angle lenses
45	f/2.8–32	Distagon T*	9	7	0.5 m (1 ft 8 in)	80.0×99.0 mm (3.1×3.9 in)	821 g (29.0 oz)	72	
55	f/3.5–32	Distagon T*	7	7	0.45 m (1 ft 6 in)	81.0×75.0 mm (3.2×3.0 in)	500 g (18 oz)	72	
Normal lenses
80	f/2–22	Planar T*	6	5	0.7 m (2 ft 4 in)	80.0×67.0 mm (3.1×2.6 in)	524 g (18.5 oz)	72	
Portrait lenses
140	f/2.8–32	Sonnar T*	7	5	1.3 m (4 ft 3 in)	81.0×98.0 mm (3.2×3.9 in)	688 g (24.3 oz)	72	
210	f/4–45	Sonnar T*	7	4	1.4 m (4 ft 7 in)	81.0×177 mm (3.2×7.0 in)	1,178 g (41.6 oz)	72	
Telephoto lenses
350	f/4–45	Tele-Apotessar T*	9	8	1.9 m (6 ft 3 in)	114×273 mm (4.5×10.7 in)	3.61 kg (8.0 lb)	95	
Zoom lenses
45~90	f/4.5–32	Vario-Sonnar T*	12	10	0.5 m (1 ft 8 in)	102×115 mm (4.0×4.5 in)	1,140 g (40 oz)	95	
Macro lenses
120	f/4–45	Apo-Makro-Planar T*	8	5	1× mag.	86.0×104 mm (3.4×4.1 in)	796 g (28.1 oz)	72	(manual-focus lens)
Teleconverters
1.4×	1.4×	Mutar T*	6	5	—N/a	82.0×41.0 mm (3.2×1.6 in)	510 g (18 oz)	—N/a	Designed for Tele-Apotessar T* 4/350, but also works with Sonnar T* 2,8/140 and Sonnar T* 4/210. Not compatible with other lenses.

==== Lenses for N series ====
The following lenses were made for the N-mount systems which offered auto-focus function. With the use of NAM-1 adaptor, all lenses of the "645" systems can be mounted on N-series cameras which offered auto-focus function. If uses both NAM-1 and MAM-1 adaptors simultaneously, Hasselblad V-series lenses including C, CF, CFE, CFI, F and FE (manual-focus) can be mounted on N-series cameras as well.

Interchangeable Carl Zeiss lenses for Contax N-mount cameras
FL (mm)	Apr.	Name	Construction		Min. Focus	Dimensions			Notes
FL (mm)	Apr.	Name	Ele	Grp	Min. Focus	Φ×L	Wgt.	Filter (mm)	Notes
Ultra wide angle zoom lenses
17~35	f/2.8–22	Vario-Sonnar T*	15	10	0.5 m (1 ft 8 in)	102×96.0 mm (4.0×3.8 in)	900 g (32 oz)	95	
Wide to telephoto zoom lenses
24~85	f/3.5~4.5–22	Vario-Sonnar T*	14	12	0.5 m (1 ft 8 in)	90.0×71.0 mm (3.5×2.8 in)	570 g (20 oz)	82	
28~80	f/3.5~5.6–22	Vario-Sonnar T*	7	7	0.25 m (9.8 in)	76.0×70.0 mm (3.0×2.8 in)	380 g (13 oz)	55	
Normal lenses
50	f/1.4–16	Planar T*	7	6	0.45 m (1 ft 6 in)	80.0×55.0 mm (3.1×2.2 in)	310 g (11 oz)	67	
Portrait lenses
85	f/1.4–16	Planar T*	10	9	0.83 m (2 ft 9 in)	90.0×80.0 mm (3.5×3.1 in)	800 g (28 oz)	82	
Telephoto and telephoto zoom lenses
70~200	f/3.5~4.5–22	Vario-Sonnar T*	14	11	1.0 m (3 ft 3 in)	78.0×106 mm (3.1×4.2 in)	620 g (22 oz)	67	
70~300	f/4.0~5.6–22	Vario-Sonnar T*	16	11	1.5 m (4 ft 11 in)	88.0×129 mm (3.5×5.1 in)	1,070 g (38 oz)	72	
400	f/4–32	Tele-Apotessar T*	7	6	2.9 m (9 ft 6 in)	120×290 mm (4.7×11.4 in)	3.58 kg (7.9 lb)	drop-in	
Macro lenses
100	f/2.8–22	Makro-Sonnar T*	12	8	0.32 m (1 ft 1 in)	86.0×130 mm (3.4×5.1 in)	960 g (34 oz)	72	

In addition, there was one lens that was never released:

- Makro-Planar T* 100/2.8 – This version appeared in the debut of N-series and was shown in some early N-series brochures only. Perhaps it had never been running in mass production. It was said the Makro-Planar design was not ideal for auto-focus, so it was then replaced by the new design "Makro-Sonnar T* 100/2.8" before entered to mass production.

== See also ==
- List of digital camera brands
- List of photographic equipment makers
- Yashica
- Fujifilm Barcode System (supported by Contax 645 AF)
