= Contax I =

1930s era camera

Contax
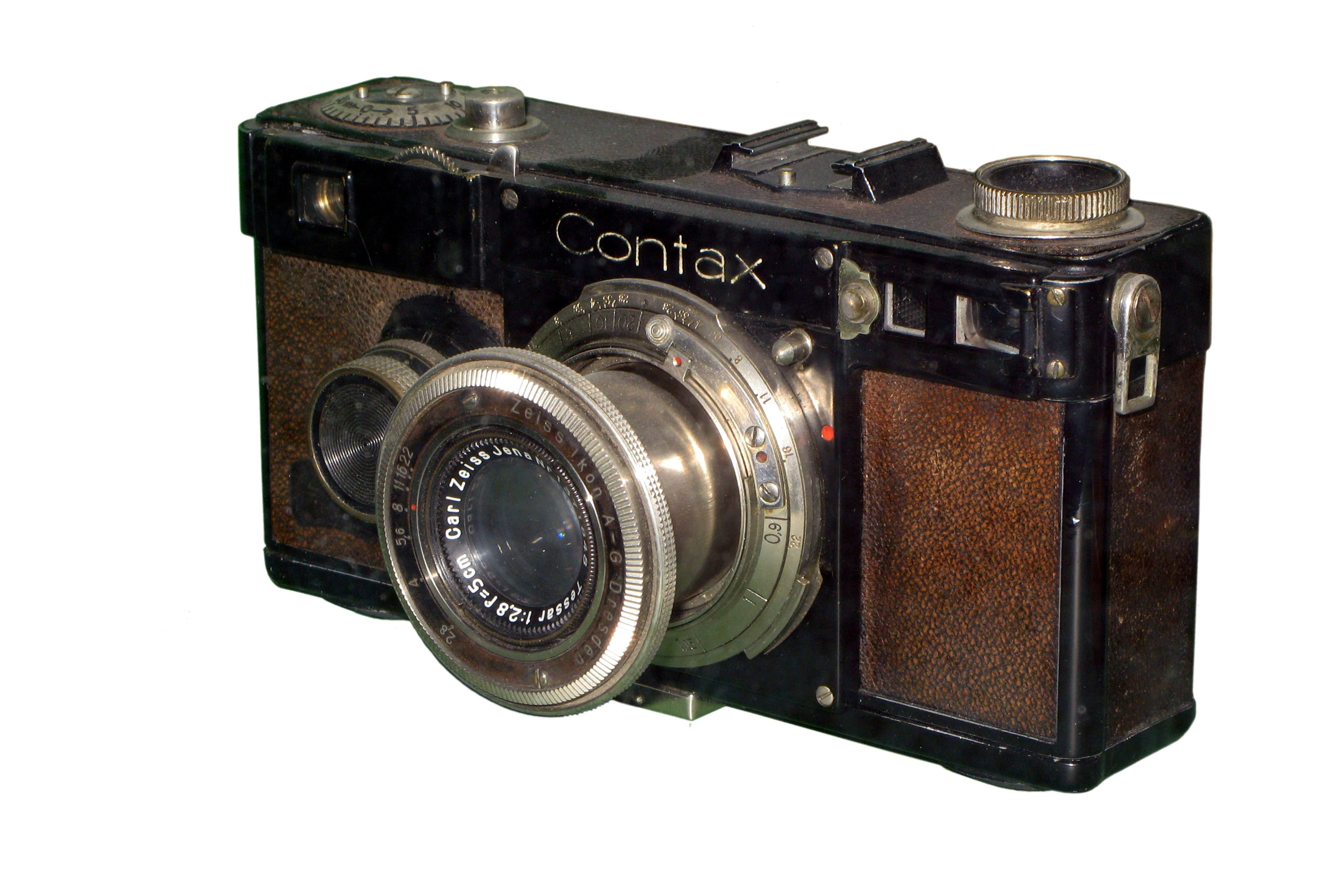

Overview
- Maker: Contax
- Type: 35 mm rangefinder camera

Lens
- Lens mount: Contax bayonet

Focusing
- Focus: manual

Exposure/metering
- Exposure: manual

Flash
- Flash: standard accessory shoe

The Contax I, or Original Contax, is a 35 mm rangefinder camera made between 1932 and 1936 by Zeiss Ikon. The Contax I had six identifiable variants, but fundamentally identical; every aspect was designed to outperform the Leica. For instance, the removable back was for faster loading and reloading, the bayonet lens mount was designed for rapid lens interchangeability, the long-base rangefinder allowed more accurate focusing, and the vertical metal shutter not only gave a faster maximum speed but also banished the problem of shutter blinds burning.

== History ==
In 1932, Zeiss Ikon of Dresden decided to produce a competitor to the Leica II, designed to be superior in every way. The name Contax was chosen after a poll among its employees. Dr. Ing. Heinz Kuppenbender was listed On patents as the inventor of this camera. But, in fact, Dr. Emanuel Goldberg was the designer of the Contax. Goldberg continued to work on this camera design until he was forced to leave Dresden in 1933 for France.

Made between 1932 and 1936, the original Contax (later known as Contax I after later models were introduced) was markedly different from the corresponding Leica II. Using a die-cast alloy body, it housed a vertically travelling metal focal-plane shutter. The shutter was reminiscent of the one used in Contessa-Nettel cameras, made out of interlocking black-finished brass slats. somewhat like a roll-up garage door (Note: By contrast, the competitive Leica used rolls of rubberized fabric moving horizontally. The Contax design allowed a slightly higher shutter speed: the top speed was 1/1250 second, as compared to 1/1000 second on other cameras with a focal-plane shutter or 1/500 second on a between-the-lens shutter.)

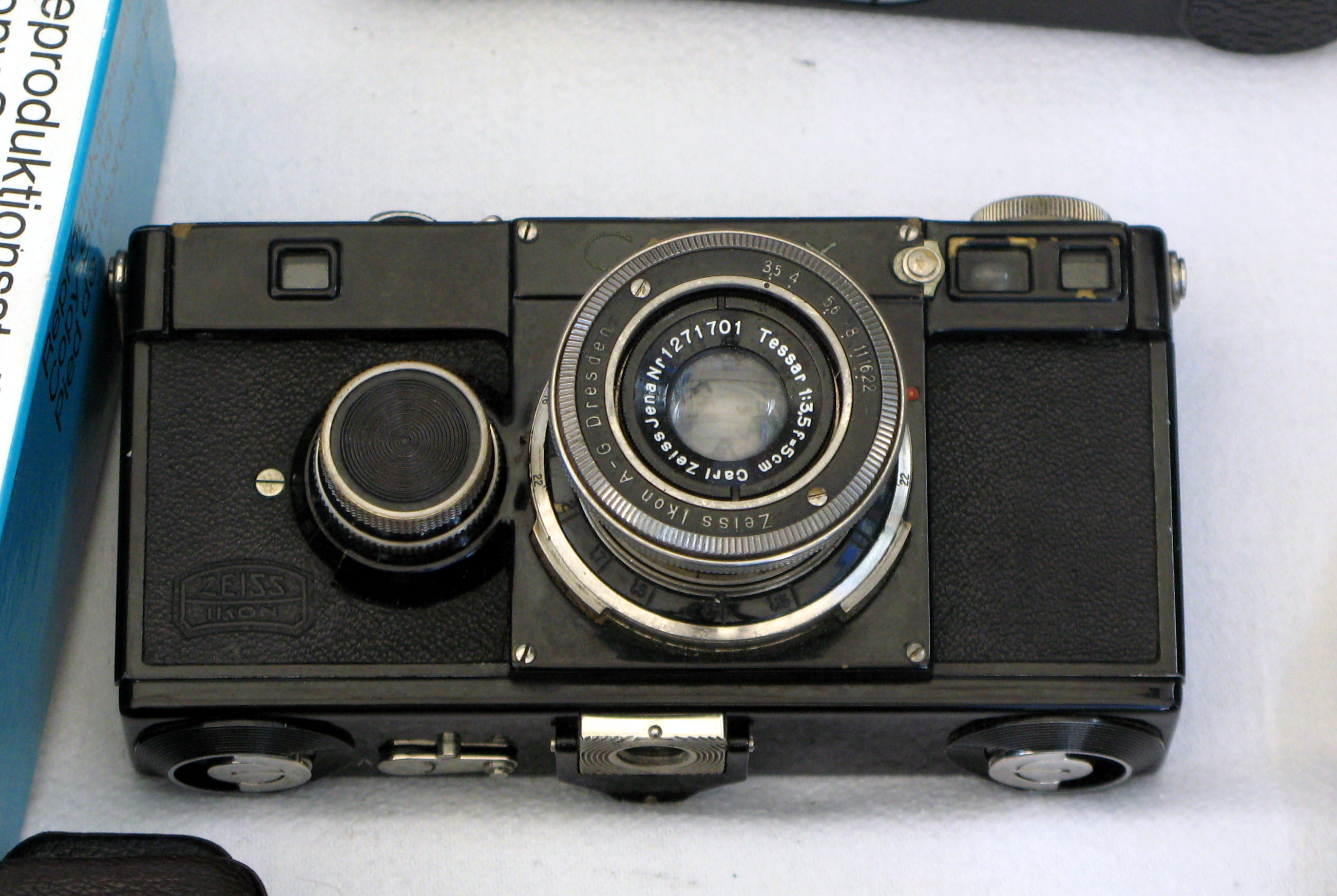

The interlocking slats were aligned by specially made silk ribbons, which were very strong but subject to wear. The coupled rangefinder had a very long baseline, with its own eyepiece next to that of the viewfinder.

Other main differences included focusing drive built into the camera body for use with standard lens, removable back, shutter speed knob integral with film wind knob placed at the front of the camera body, and finished in black.

The young lens designer Ludwig Bertele, formerly of Ernemann, was charged with the responsibility of designing the lenses.

== See also ==
- Contax II
