= Contax i4R =

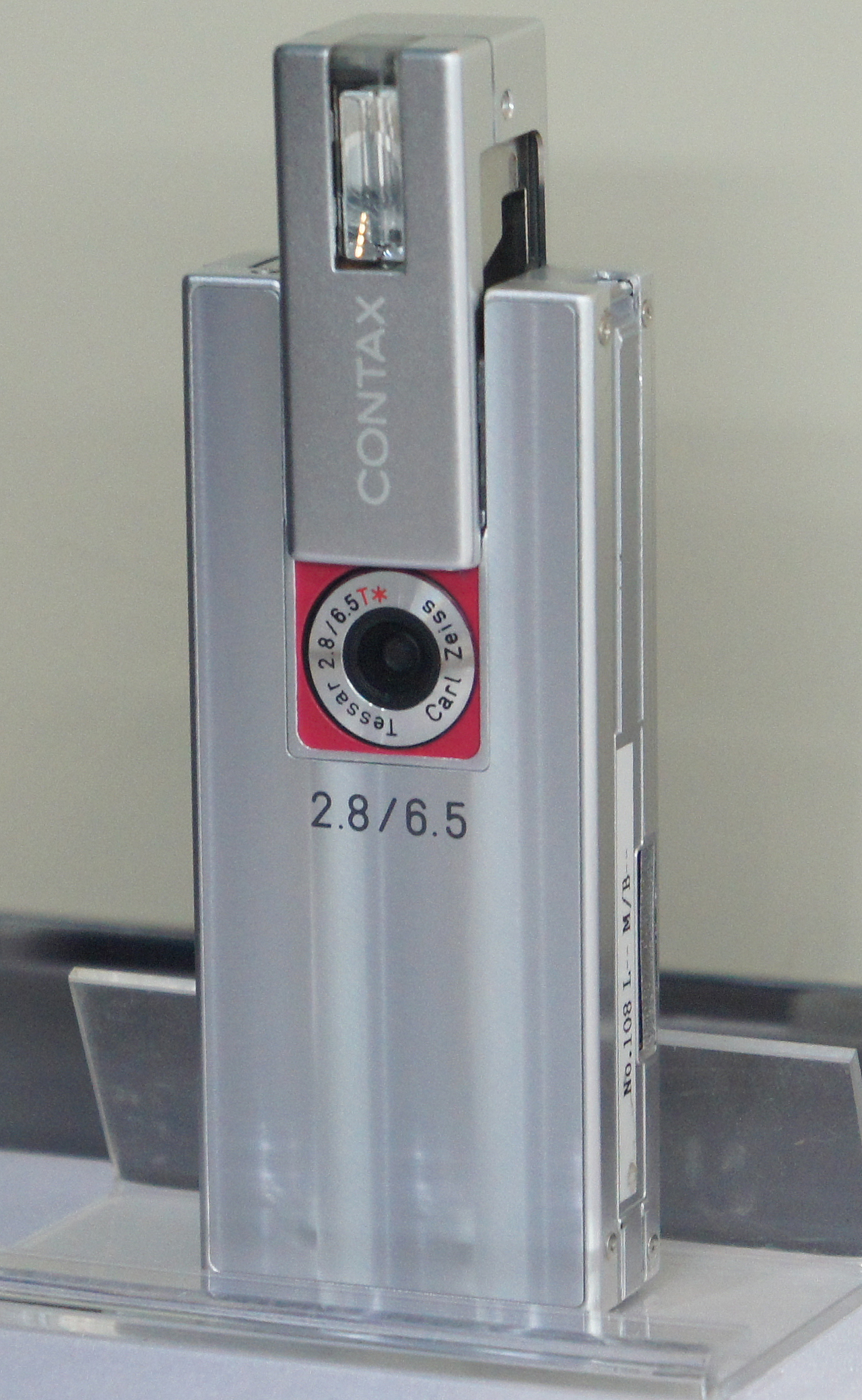
Contax i4R

The Contax i4R is a digital camera manufactured by Kyocera. The i4R was announced on 28 September 2004. Its design was one of the more unusual of Contax's designs. Kyocera released it to the public in November, 2004 with a price of 299 GBP. The i4R features a Carl Zeiss Tessar T* 6.5mm f/2.8 lens. Its image pickup device is a charge-coupled device with 4.19 million gross pixels. The i4R is PictBridge-compliant. Besides its usually small size for the time, its other unusual feature was its ability to focus down to about two inches (five centimetres).

Kyocera announced its plans to discontinue the Contax brand in April 2005, and exited all camera activity in September 2005.

== See also ==
- Contax
