= Contax II =

35 mm rangefinder camera

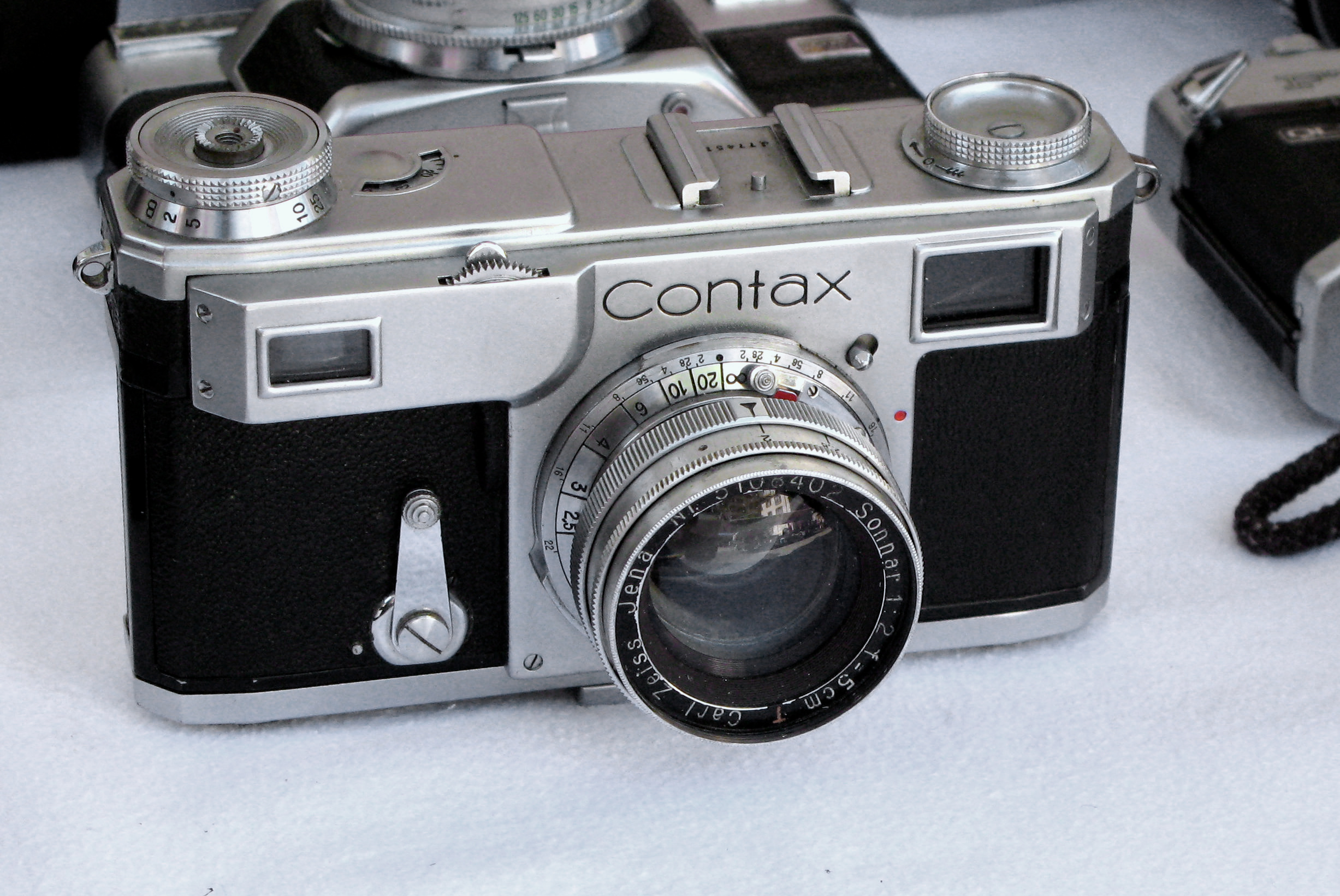

Overview
- Type: 35 mm rangefinder camera

Lens
- Lens mount: Contax bayonet

Focusing
- Focus: manual

Exposure/metering
- Exposure: manual

Flash
- Flash: standard accessory shoe

The Contax II is a 35 mm rangefinder camera. It was released in 1936, in Dresden, Germany and was the successor of the original Contax later called the Contax I. It was the first camera with a rangefinder and viewfinder combined in a single window. Its chief designer was Hubert Nerwin. The Nettax was meant to be a cheaper alternative, it was a derivative of the Super Nettel with a rigid body and interchangeable lenses with a specific bayonet and a very limited range of lenses.

The Contax ll was the impressive Zeiss response to the popularity and demand for the Leica 35mm camera. This demand for high quality 35mm picture making tools was based on portability and the increasing availability of 35mm motion picture film, packaged into spools and marketed to amateur as well as professional photographers. The Contax became the 'first choice' among the professional community while the Leica was considered more the choice for well heeled amateurs and practitioners of a more artistic leaning. For example: Robert Capa in the first camp and Alexander Rodchenko in the second.

Zeiss continued to produce cameras, lenses, and scientific equipment during this period. Its lenses, including the 5 cm f/1.5 Sonnar for the 35 mm film format, remained in use among photographers and collectors. The company also marketed a range of accessories and related camera equipment, contributing to a more extensive camera systems of the 1930s, 1940s, and early 1950s.

After World War II, the first rangefinder cameras from Nikon (Nippon Kogaku) were essentially copies of the Contax II design, although they had cloth horizontally-traveling focal plane shutters rather than the metal vertically-traveling shutter in the Contax II.
