= Contarex =

Line of cameras made by Zeiss Ikon

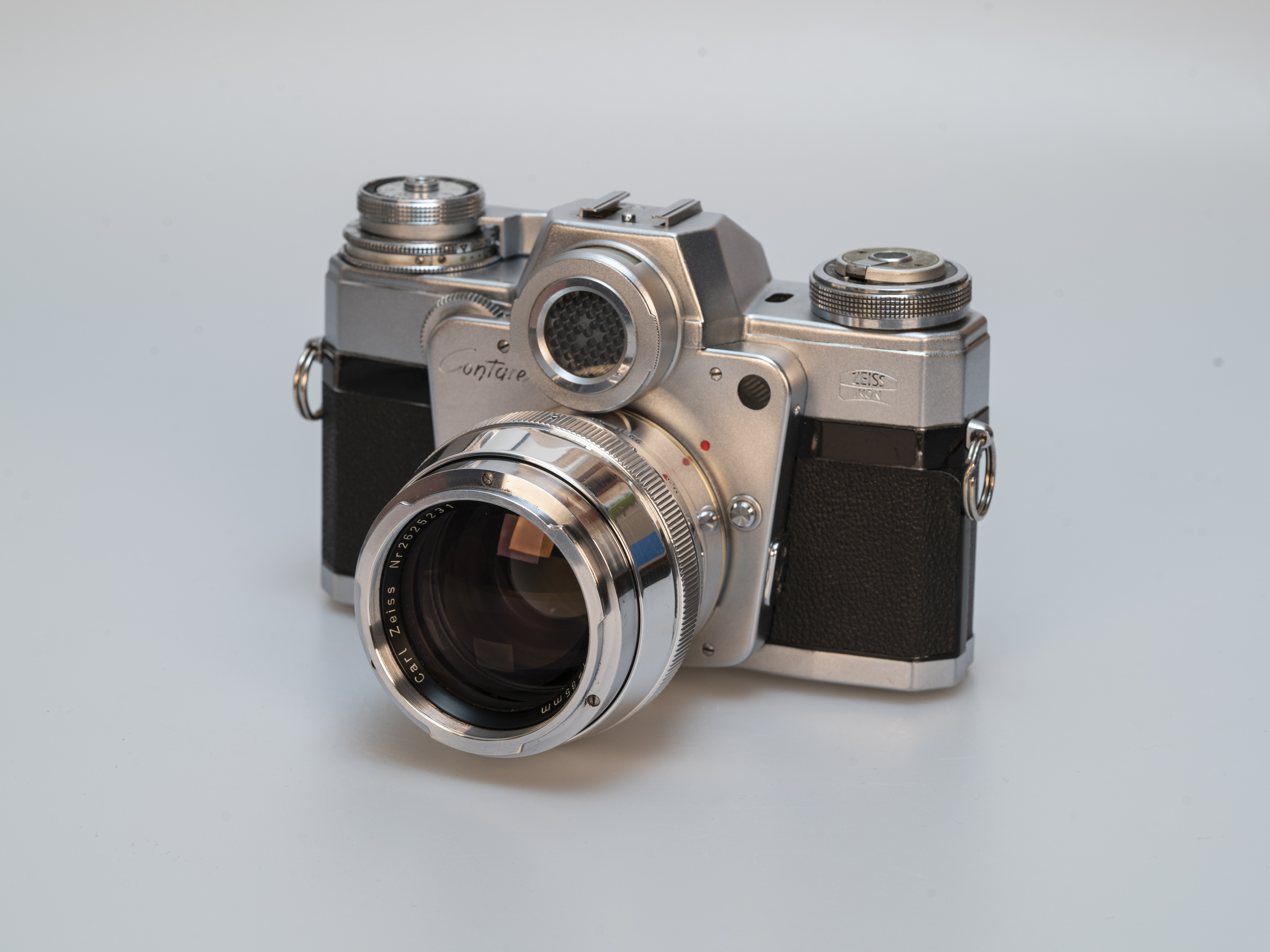
- Contarex I, aka Bullseye or Cyclops (1959–66), fitted with the Zeiss Sonnar 85mm f/2

Overview
- Maker: Zeiss Ikon
- Type: 35mm SLR camera

Lens
- Lens mount: Contarex bayonet

Sensor/medium
- Film format: 135 film, 24×36 mm

Focusing
- Focus: manual

Exposure/metering
- Exposure: manual

Contarex is a line of 35mm single lens reflex cameras (SLRs) made by Zeiss Ikon. It was first presented at Photokina in 1958 and initially scheduled for delivery in the spring of 1959, but it was not made generally available in the United States until March 1960. The first model is popularly known as the Contarex I, the Bullseye, or the Cyclops, after the prominent light meter window above the lens, in front of the pentaprism. The camera was aimed at the high-end and professional markets; in 1961, the retail price (including the 50 mm f/2.0 Planar lens) was $499.

== Cameras ==
The camera bodies are complex; for example, the first model includes nearly 1100 parts, with seven principal alloy pressure castings and additional stamped cover plates to complete the structure. However, it is rugged and roller bearings are used in the aperture mechanism. Inevitably it requires a specialist for its repair; 43 parts have to be dismantled to remove the top plate for internal access.

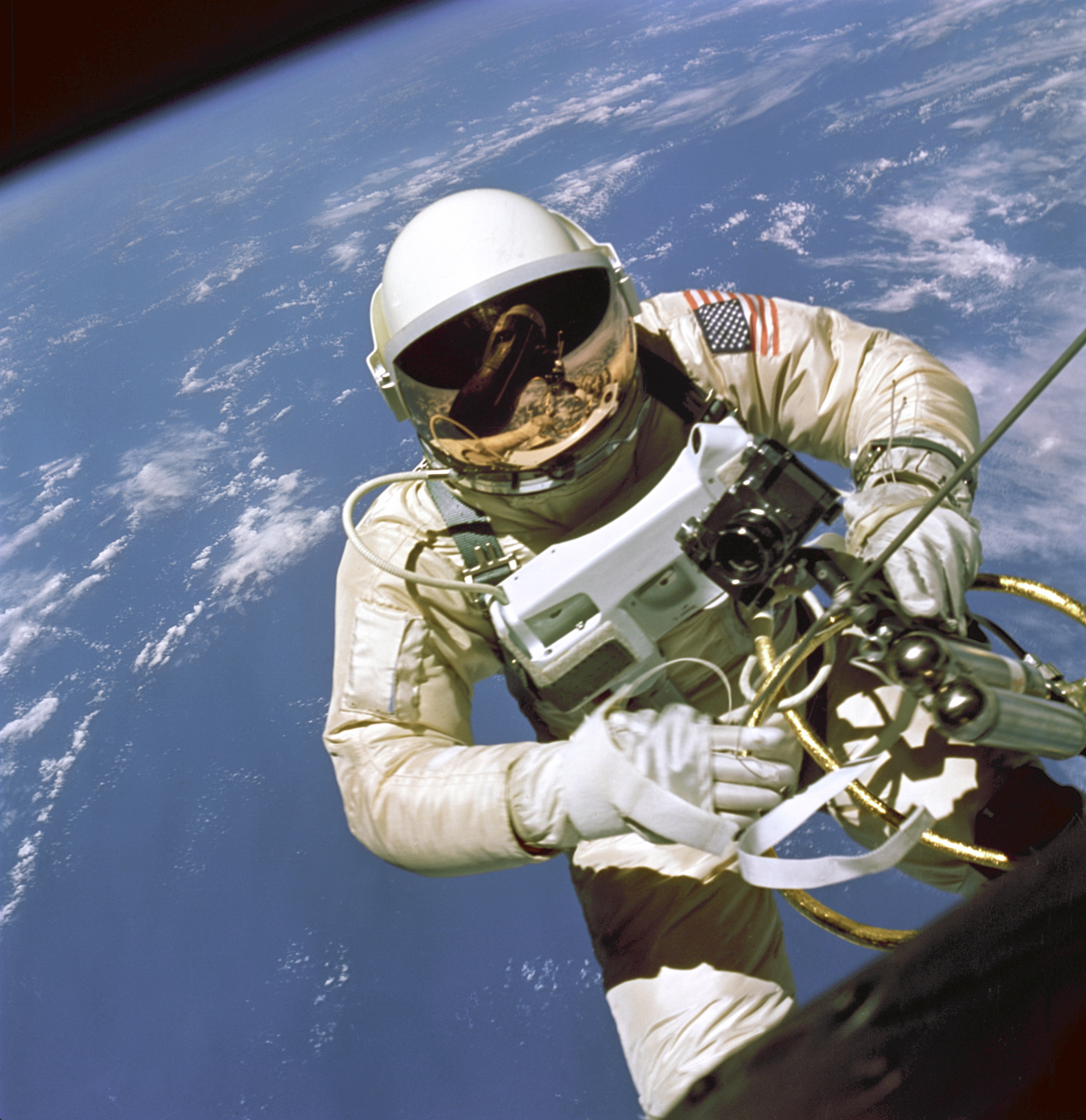
Ed White during June 1965 EVA with Contarex camera

There is a prominent wheel for the photographer's right index finger, on the top corner of the lens mount escutcheon, which controls aperture. This detail was reminiscent of the focusing wheel on pre-war Contax rangefinder cameras, and was carried throughout the Contarex SLR line. Shutter speeds are controlled by a dial coaxial with and at the base of the film winding lever / exposure counter / shutter release button at the photographer's right hand.

Contarex SLRs featured a slip-off back, which could be removed and replaced by an interchangeable magazine back (catalog 20.0304). This magazine back concept was shared with the Contaflex SLR, although Contarex magazine backs are wider and physically incompatible with Contaflex cameras and vice versa.

A custom modified Contarex Special was used by astronaut Ed White during the first NASA extra vehicular activity (EVA) on June 3, 1965, during the flight of Gemini 4.

Geoffrey Crawley published an extensive review of the Contarex Super and lens system in 1970 for the British Journal of Photography.

Contarex cameras
Name	Years	Shutter speeds		Battery	Notes / Refs.
Name	Years	Range	X-Sync	Battery	Notes / Refs.
I, aka Bullseye or Cyclops	1959–66	1–1/1000s + B	1/60s	N/A	
Special	1960–66	1–1/1000s + B	1/60s	N/A	
Professional	1966–67	1–1/1000s + B	1/60s	N/A	
Super	1967–72	1–1/1000s + B	1/60s	1×PX13	
Super Electronic	1968–72	8–1/1000s + B	1/60s	2×Pertrix 245/ Mallory MN9100 (1.5 V each)	

=== Contarex I ===
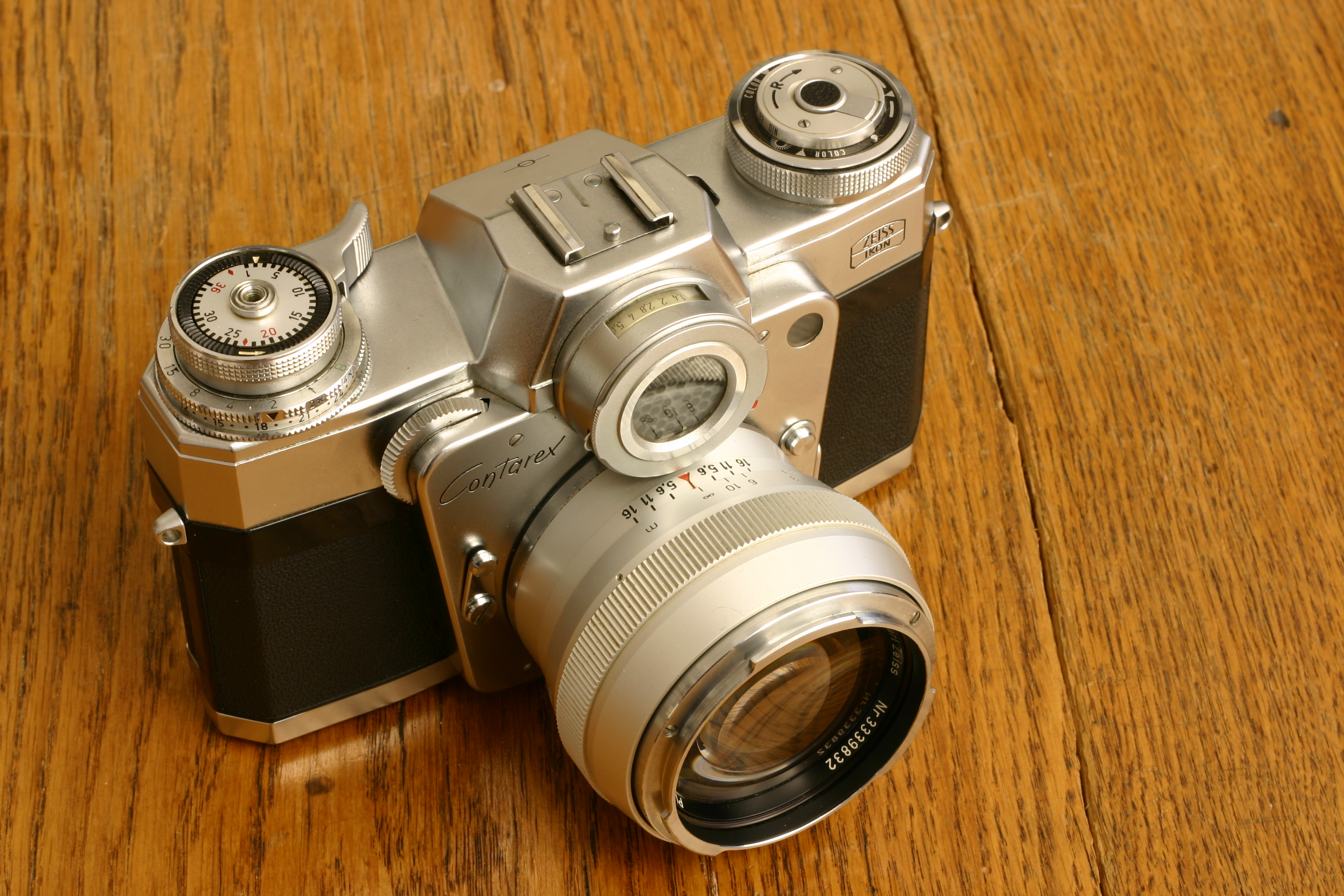
Contarex I, showing aperture selected in the "Bullseye/Cyclops" window

The Contarex I, aka Bullseye (catalog 10.2401), was built between 1959 and 1966. It was the first 35mm SLR camera with a focal plane shutter that provides direct light meter coupling to the shutter-, aperture-, and film speed-settings; they are interconnected by cords. An aperture simulator for the exposure meter in the Cyclops window uses an iris in front of the selenium meter cell. To set the proper exposure, the meter needle is aligned with an index triangle, which is visible both in a top plate window and to the right side of the viewfinder. The camera also has an interchangeable focusing screen which is, by default, a split image inside of a micro-prism.

A thumb-wheel on the camera controls the lens aperture, and the value is shown in a window on top of the centrally located meter cell (the Cyclops window). The shutter speed dial is lifted and rotated to set the film speed. The aperture in the interchangeable automatic lens closes when the shutter release is depressed and reopens when the camera is wound on for the next exposure. Due to the limited meter range, not every camera setting combination is possible to accommodate on the Contarex I exposure meter.

=== Contarex Special ===
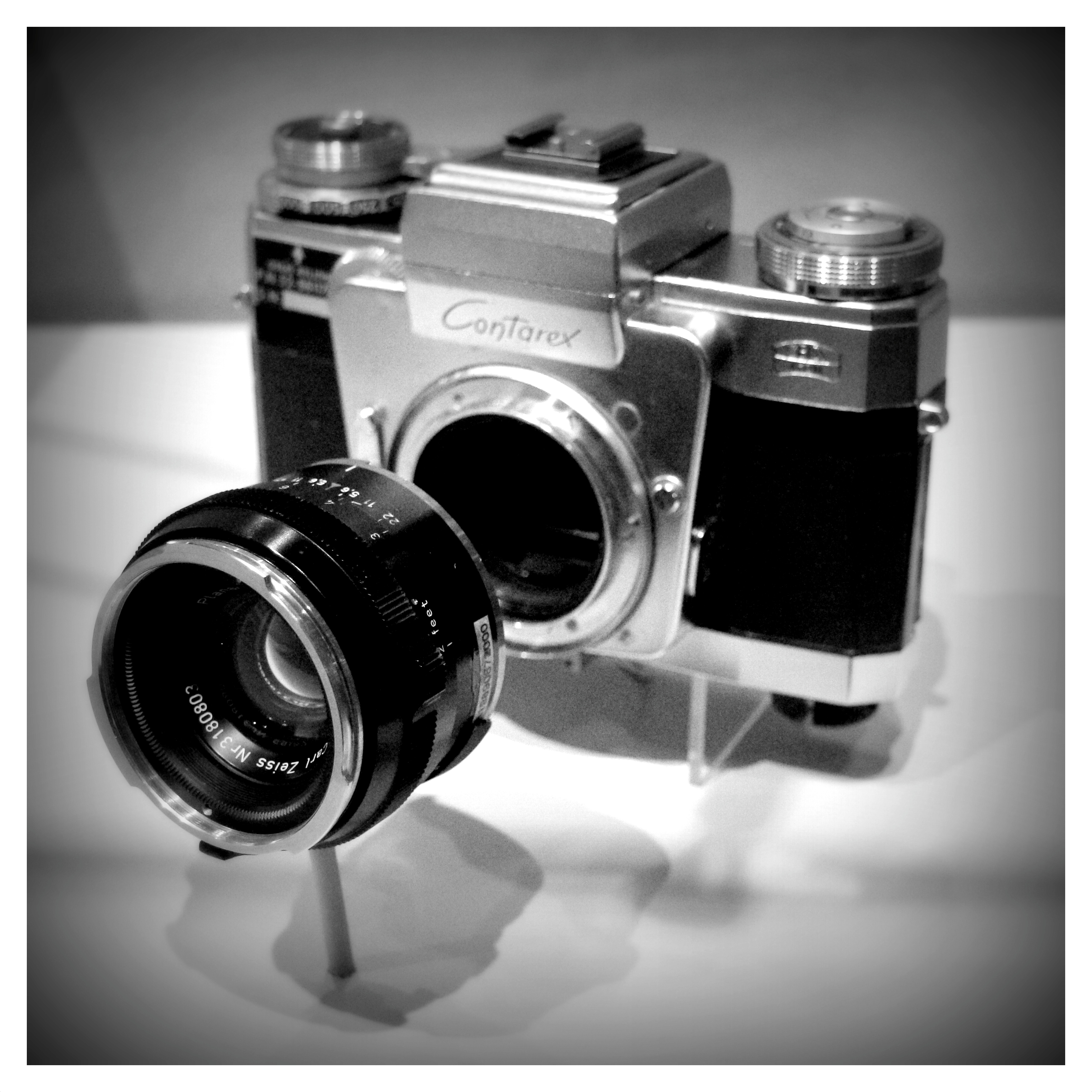
Contarex Special carried by Ed White with Planar 50 mm f/2 lens and folding waist-level finder

The Contarex Special (catalog 10.2500) was equivalent to the Bullseye, but the Special omitted the selenium cell meter. It was built from 1960 to 1966. The viewfinder of the Special is removable and two styles were available: a pentaprism, for eye-level use, or a waist-level finder.

=== Contarex Professional ===
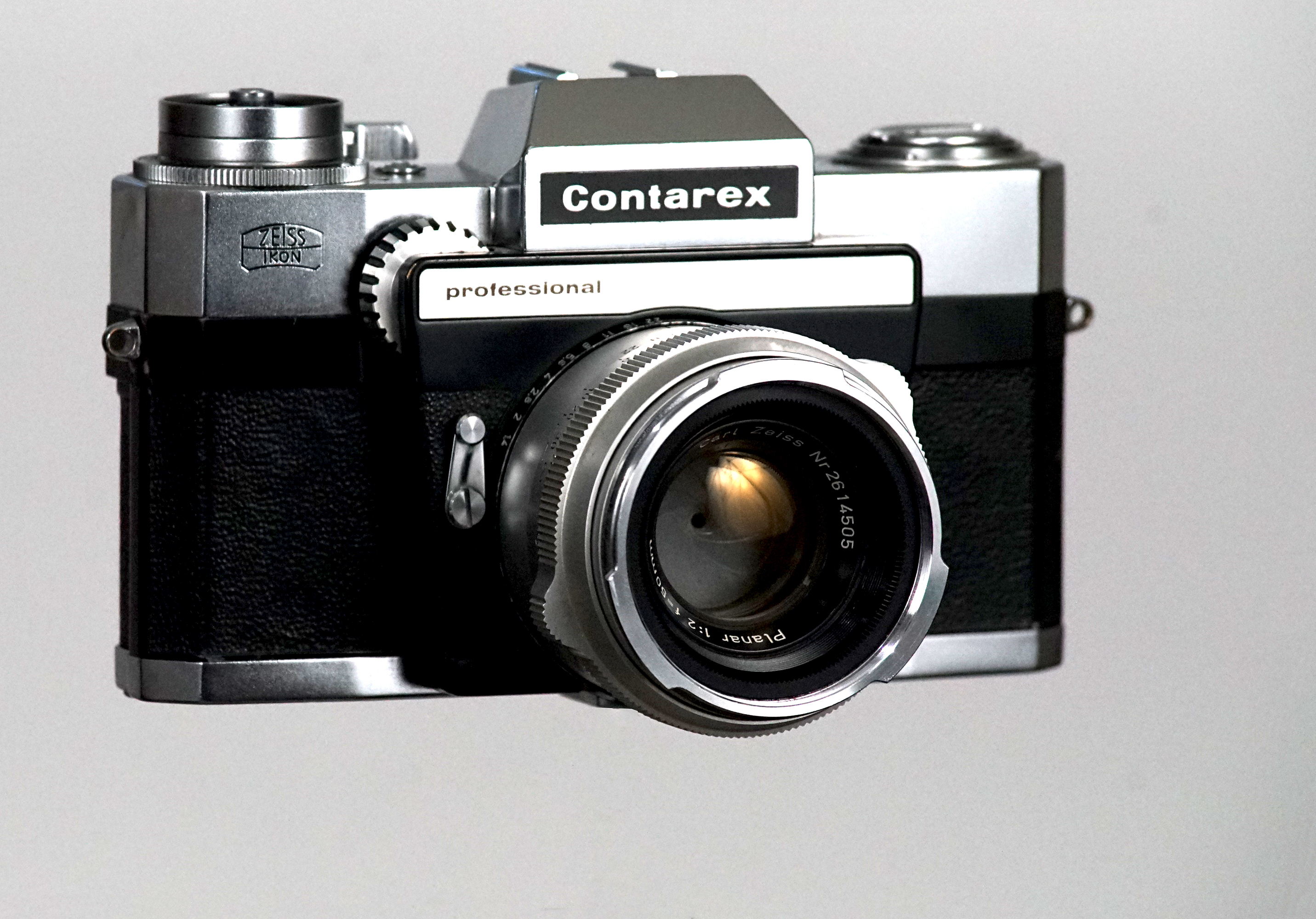
Contarex Professional with Planar 50 mm f/2 lens

The Contarex Professional or P (catalog 10.2700) replaced the Special with updated cosmetics, and like the Special, also deleted the internal light meter. It was built from 1966 to 1967. Unlike the Special, the Professional was equipped with a fixed eye-level pentaprism viewfinder.

The Professional was the first model released in the second generation of Contarex SLR cameras (spanning the Professional, Super, and Electronic); the updated appearance included replacing the script "Contarex" logo of the first generation (Bullseye and Special) with a blocky typeface set on a black background on the front of the pentaprism viewfinder housing. In addition, the film speed setting/reminder dial was moved to be coaxial with the rewind knob.

=== Contarex Super ===
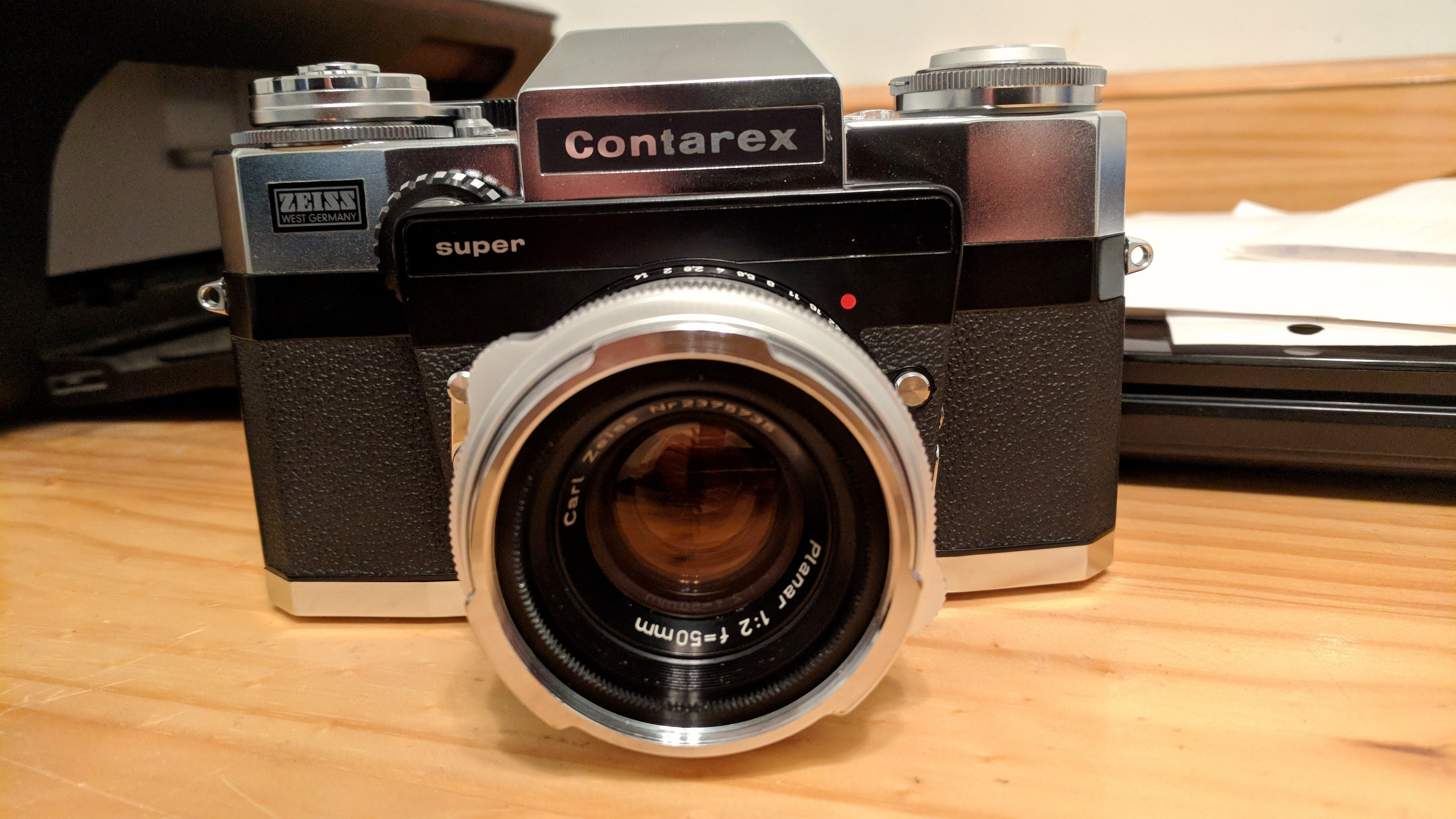
Contarex Super with Planar 50 mm f/2 lens; note "ZEISS West Germany" branding instead of "Zeiss Ikon", indicating this was produced after 1972

The Contarex Super or S (catalog 10.2600) succeeded the Bullseye with the same updated cosmetics of the Professional. It was built from 1967 to 1972, when Zeiss Ikon ceased camera production.

The internal meter for second-generation Contarex models so equipped (Super and Super Electronic) used a CdS through-the-lens photoresistor, rather than the external selenium meter of the first-generation Bullseye. The meter power switch is on the opposite side of the lens mount escutcheon from the aperture setting wheel.

=== Contarex Super Electronic ===
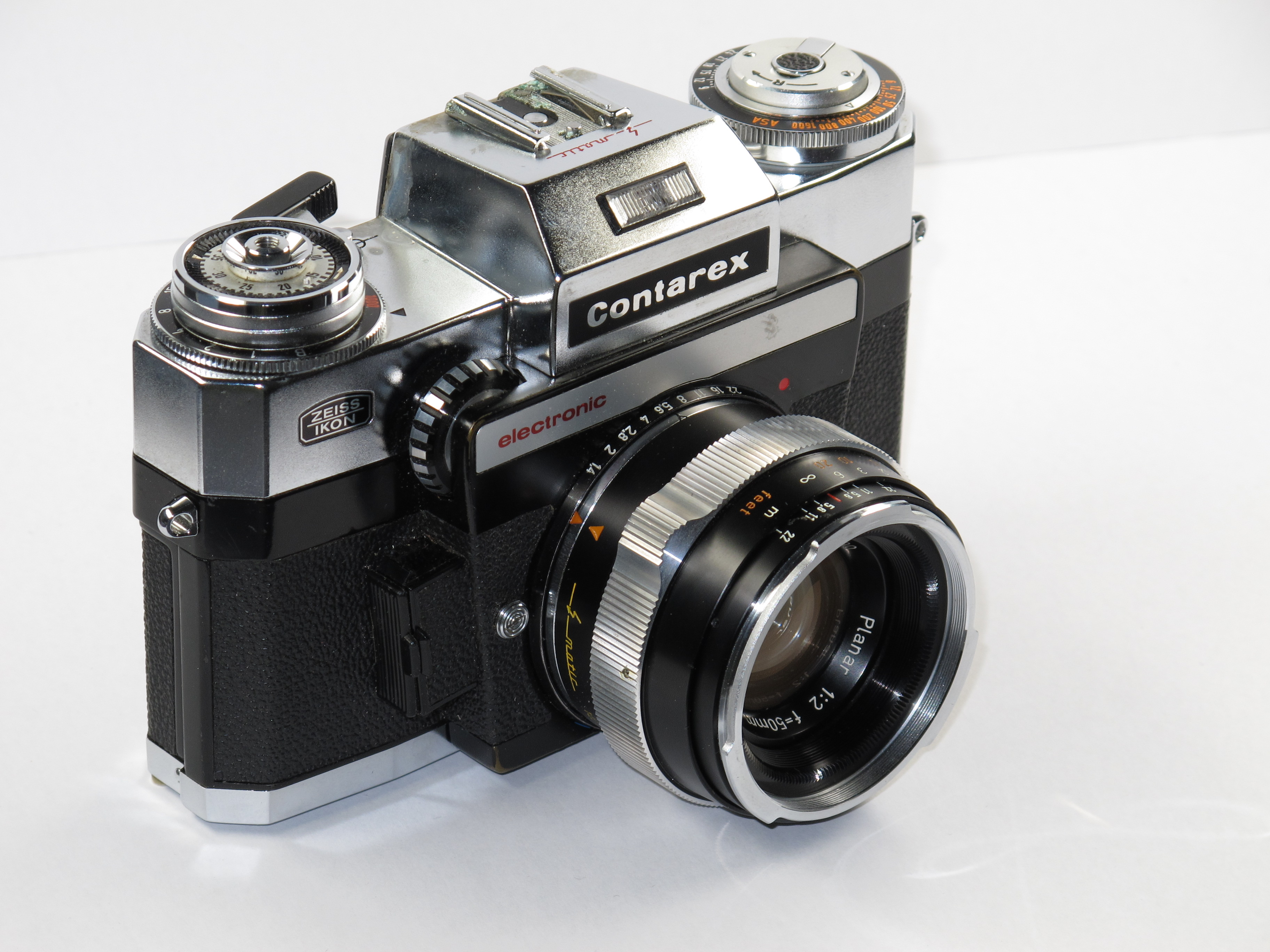
Contarex Super Electronic with Planar 50 mm f/2 lens

The Contarex Super Electronic or SE (catalog 10.2800) used the chassis of the Super, fitted with an electronically controlled shutter. It was built from 1968 to 1972, when Zeiss Ikon ceased camera production. A few cameras were assembled later, with the Carl Zeiss brand instead of Zeiss Ikon. With a "photoelectric timer" attachment, the SE was capable of aperture-priority autoexposure.

=== Contarex Hologon ===
Cutaway diagram of Hologon lens, designed by Erhard Glatzel for Zeiss (from US Pat. 3,661,447)

The Contarex Hologon was a fixed-lens camera that used the same stripped-down second-generation chassis as the microscope camera, which removed the reflex mirror and viewfinder mechanisms, featuring mechanically controlled shutter speeds ranging from 1–1/500s plus "B"ulb and "T"imer. It was purpose-built to carry the fixed-focus, fixed-aperture, three-element Hologon 15 mm f/8 ultra wide angle lens and a matching viewfinder. The viewfinder had seven elements, more than the lens itself. The field of view was so wide the camera was bundled with an accessory pistol grip that screws into the tripod socket to prevent inadvertent inclusion of the photographer's hands in the image. To compensate for vignetting, a radially-graduated neutral density filter was included.

The Hologon was built from 1969 to 1972, when Zeiss Ikon ceased camera production. Like the Super and Electronic, a few cameras were assembled later. Some Hologon cameras have been disassembled for their lenses, which were fitted with Leica M bayonet mounts.

=== Contarex Microscope ===
The Contarex Microscope used the chassis of the Super, stripped of its viewfinder and mirror assembly. Shutter speeds for the focal plane shutter range from 1–1/500 sec with B and T settings.

== Lenses ==
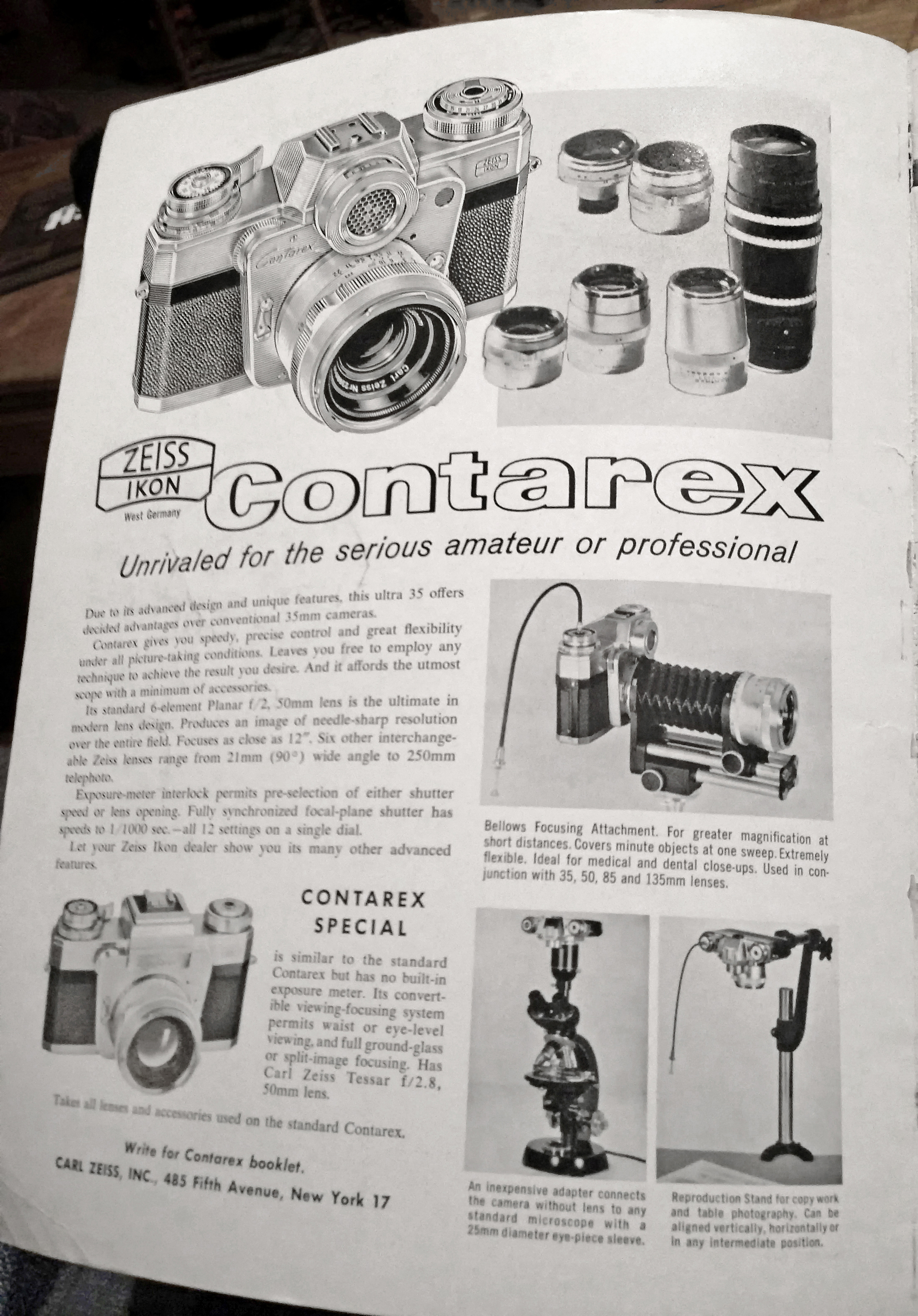
Photography Annual Contarex Ad - Winter 1962

The standard lens is the Carl Zeiss Planar 1:2 f=50mm in bright aluminium finish with a chrome 49 mm thread filter ring and an outer bayonet for Zeiss-Ikon filters. The lens focuses to 0.3 m (1 ft 0 in), which is closer than the usual 0.5 m (1 ft 8 in) for a normal lens. The focusing helical is remarkably smooth and precise. There is no aperture ring on the Contarex lens itself. It is set on the camera aperture wheel. The Contarex lens mount takes only Contarex lenses and accessories.

The lenses Zeiss designed and manufactured for the Contarex cameras have been called "the best 35 mm lenses that have ever been made". According to noted Leica historian and reviewer Erwin Puts, "Zeiss designers gave the most attention to flatness of field and the reduction of astigmatism. [...] The characteristics of the Contarex lenses are reminiscent of the Hasselblad lenses. Stopped down a bit they exhibit a remarkable finesse of gradation and depth. They may not be the sharpest lenses ever, but the rendition of shape outlines and surface details is most pleasing and subtle like a poem."
