= Director's viewfinder =

Viewfinder for directors to set framing

A director's viewfinder or director's finder is a device used by film directors and cinematographers to set the framing of a shot with a motion picture or movie camera. As these cameras are often large and heavy, this tool provides an expedient solution to set camera positions and lens choices.

There are four types of director's viewfinders. It is noteworthy that at least one cinematography guide lists learning how to use a director's viewfinder, or equivalent, as the number one fundamental that aspiring directors should consider. It is also true that some directors eschew the use of this device, instead opting for using the camera itself as the viewfinder when the camera is small enough.

== Traditional ==
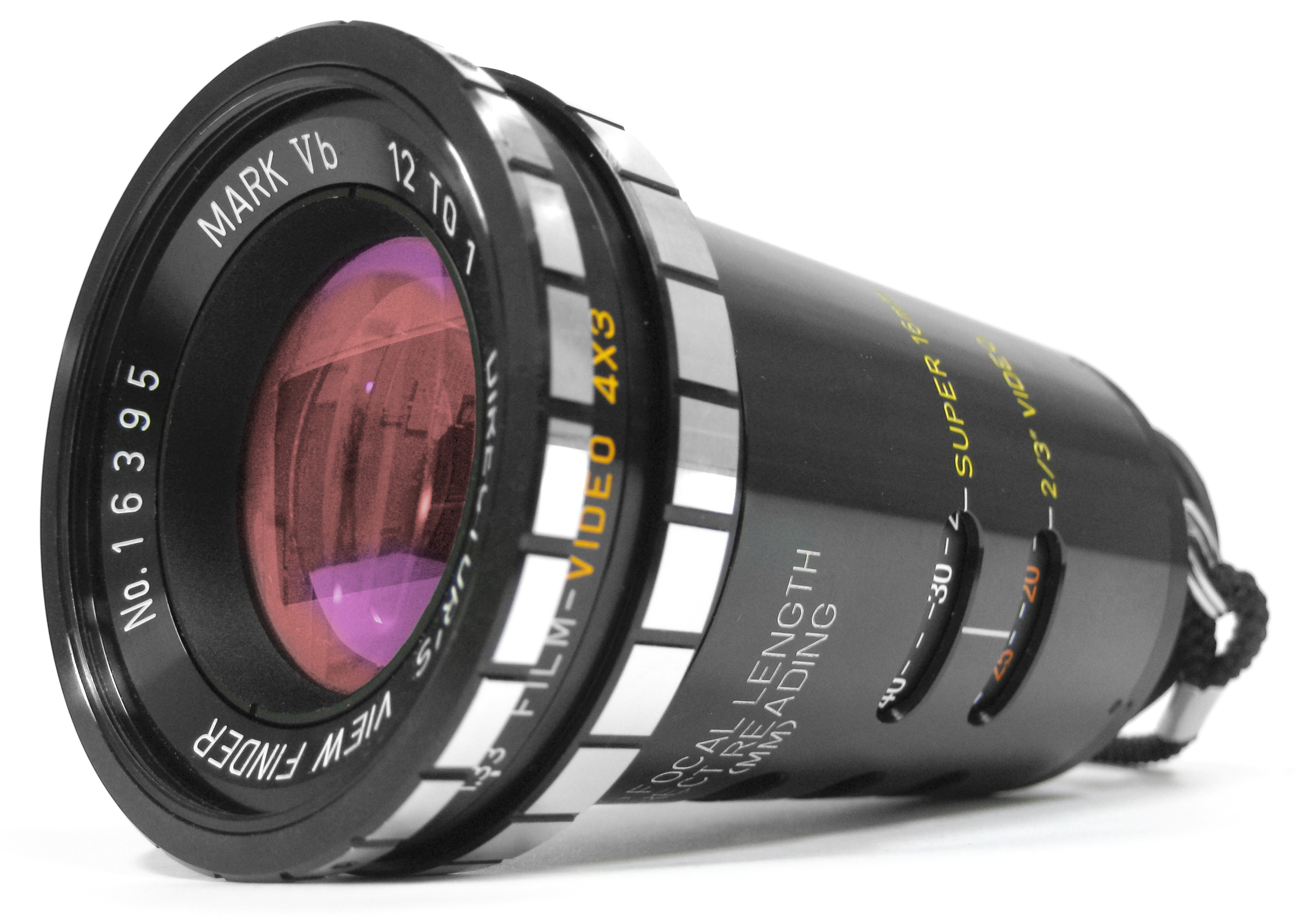
Traditional Alan Gordon Mark Vb director's viewfinder.

The most traditional and iconic director's viewfinder looks like a short telescope, can be held easily in one hand and is often seen hanging from a lanyard on the director's neck. Sometimes called a "Tewe" in Europe (after a German company that manufactured them). The functionality of these devices is limited in that they at best approximate the field of view of the lenses that will be used on the motion picture camera, but not the optical characteristics of that lens. This type of viewfinder allows the user to view a limited combination of camera format, aspect ratio and focal length.

Early non-reflex motion picture film cameras like the Mitchell Camera BNCR used a viewfinder similar in concept to the traditional director's viewfinder. Attached to the side of the camera, it was employed by the camera operator to frame a shot while filming. In between takes, the camera could be "racked over" to allow the camera operator, director or cinematographer to view the actual taking lens.

== Lens finder (optical) ==
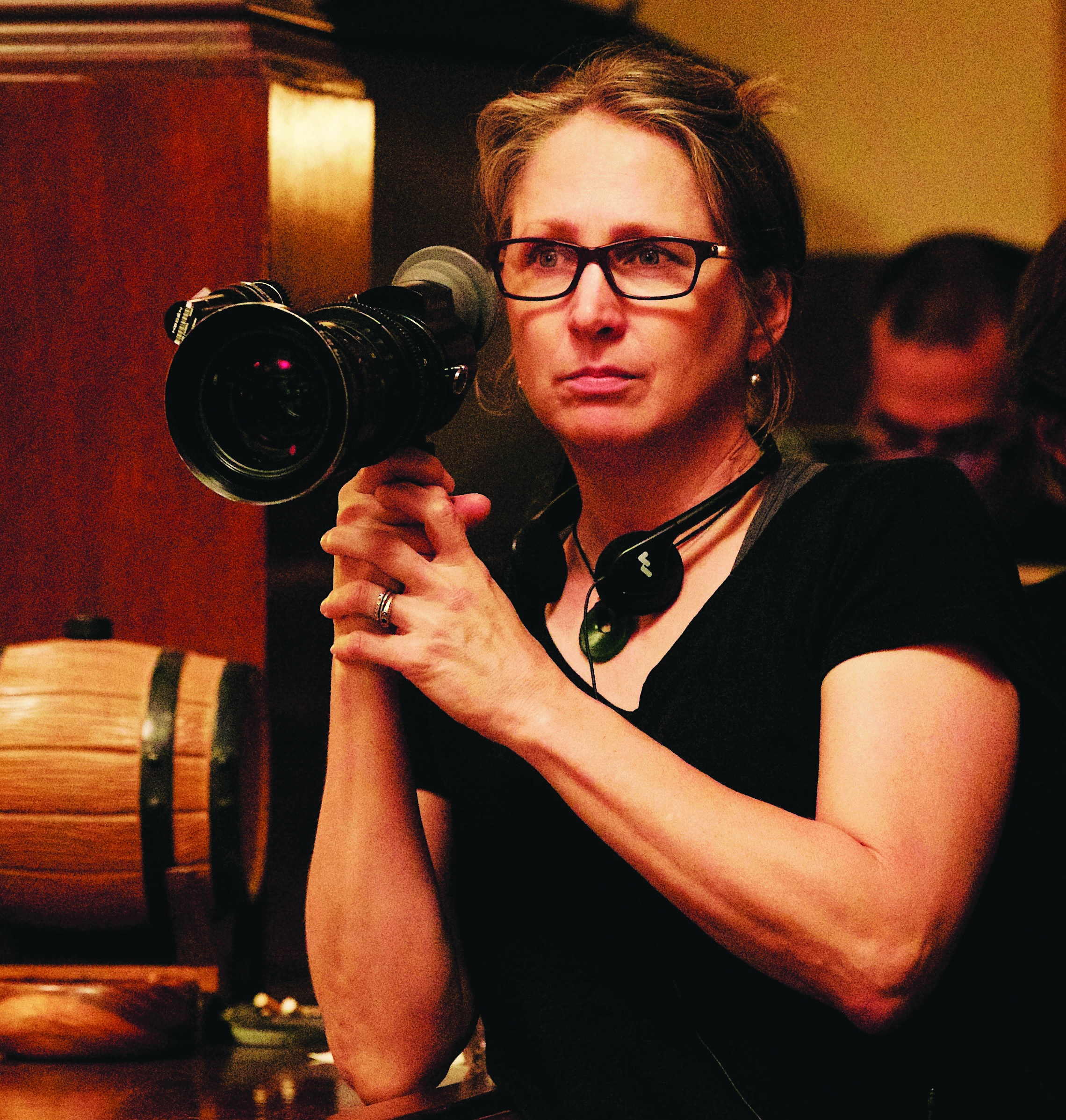
Cynthia Pusheck holding a Panavision lens mounted on a pentafinder.

The lens finder, sometimes referred to as a pentafinder or simply the director's viewfinder, is an optical device that employs the lenses that are intended to be used on the motion picture camera.

The lens finder uses a similar system found in reflex motion picture cameras; The taking lens projects an image onto a ground glass with the same format markings as the camera. The user observes the image on the ground glass by looking through an eyepiece with a diopter. A pentafinder uses a prism, to make the device more compact. Other variants include anamorphic lens finders, which incorporate optical cylinders to "de-squeeze" the image.

Lens finders exist for Mitchell BNCR mount, Arri PL and LPL, Panavision PV and SP70 mounts. Additions such as video assist have been made available on some models including the Kish Optics Ultimate Director's Viewfinder.

At the expense of being much larger than a traditional viewfinder, the lens finder allows the director and cinematographer to accurately observe field of view along with depth of field, optical aberration and subjective "feel", limited only by the quality of the ground glass.

Still common on film sets, lens finders require ground glasses that are camera format specific, the lenses that will be used in production and can only be viewed by one individual at a time. Video assist on models such as the Kish Optics Ultimate Director's Viewfinder can also be used.

== Lens finder (digital) ==
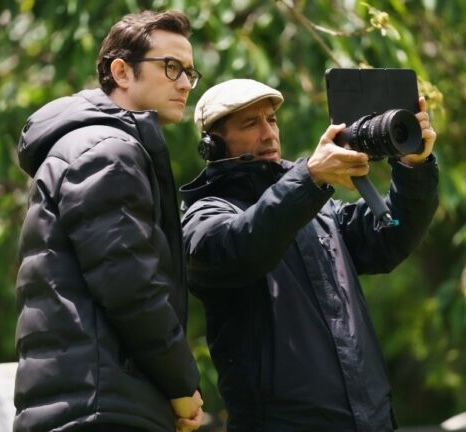
Joseph Gordon-Levitt with Jaron Presant ASC using Artemis Prime on Mr. Corman.

Artemis Prime, introduced in 2017, was the first hybrid optical / digital lens finder. Using an iPad as a screen instead of an optical eyepiece, it does not use format specific ground glass, allowing for many different camera formats to be viewed using software. This device has been used extensively by cinematographer Jaron Presant ASC on projects including Mr. Corman, Pokerface and Rampage.

Similar devices have subsequently become available, including the IBE Optics SmartFinder Pro. Some stills cameras, like the Sigma fp, also include limited director's viewfinder functionality.

== Smart phone application ==
In 2008 the smartphone director's viewfinder was introduced to the motion picture industry: a software-based tool that uses either Apple or Android mobile devices with the same basic functionality of the traditional viewfinder. These software solutions offer camera format specific emulations and enable an array of additional functionality, such as the ability to take and store images with GPS tags, create frame lines to define a specific aspect ratio, create overlays and record metadata relevant in planning shoots.

With digital media taking the place of traditional storyboards and printed script breakdowns, digital viewfinder applications have the advantage of being able to capture video sequences, allowing for a much higher level of detail in pre-production. They are also considerably cheaper than physical devices, giving greater flexibility and functionality of the traditional viewfinder but lacking the critical assessment characteristics of the lens finder.

Artemis Directors Viewfinder, the first mobile app of its kind, was awarded an Emmy in 2018 for Outstanding Achievement in Engineering Development and the BSC Bert Easey Award in recognition of its widespread use and contribution to filmmaking.
