= Contarex lenses =

Series of photographic camera lenses

Contarex lenses are a series of photographic camera lenses used by the Contarex camera, which use the Contarex bayonet lens mount. The first set of lenses was presented with the Contarex I at Photokina in 1958 and initially scheduled for delivery in the spring of 1959, but they were not made generally available in the United States until March 1960.

The series was discontinued after Zeiss Ikon ceased camera production in 1972, but there are still many used lenses available in the market. In addition, some of the lens designs were licensed to other manufacturers, who produced them under their own brands, including Asahi Optical (for Pentax K-mount SLRs), Rollei (for QBM SLRs in the Rolleiflex SL35 line), and Yashica (for the Contax SLR line). Their exemplary performance has led companies to make mount adapters to fit them to modern digital cameras.

== Lenses ==
Carl Zeiss lenses for Contarex

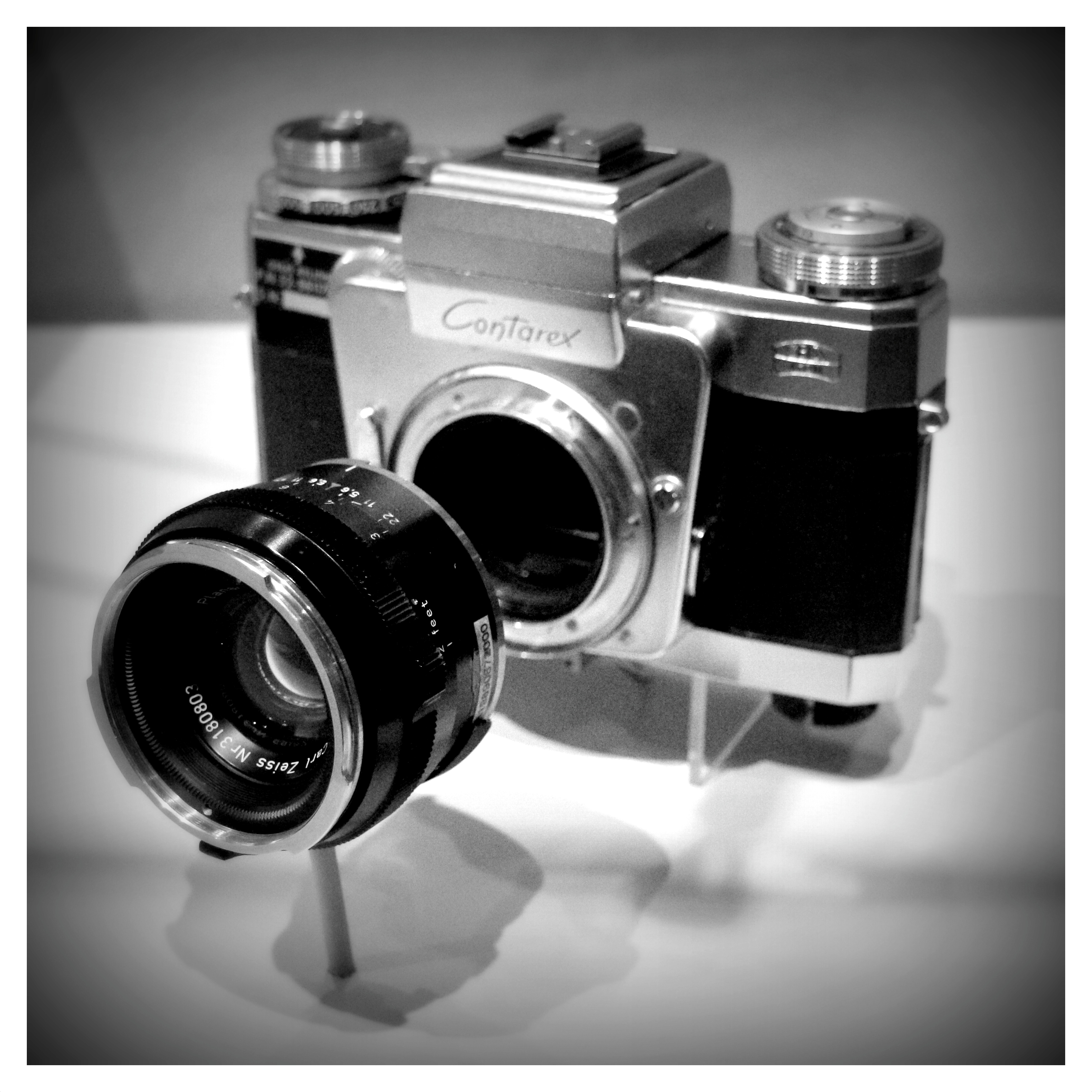
Contarex Special with Planar 50 mm f/2; note bayonet lugs are on the body instead of the lens

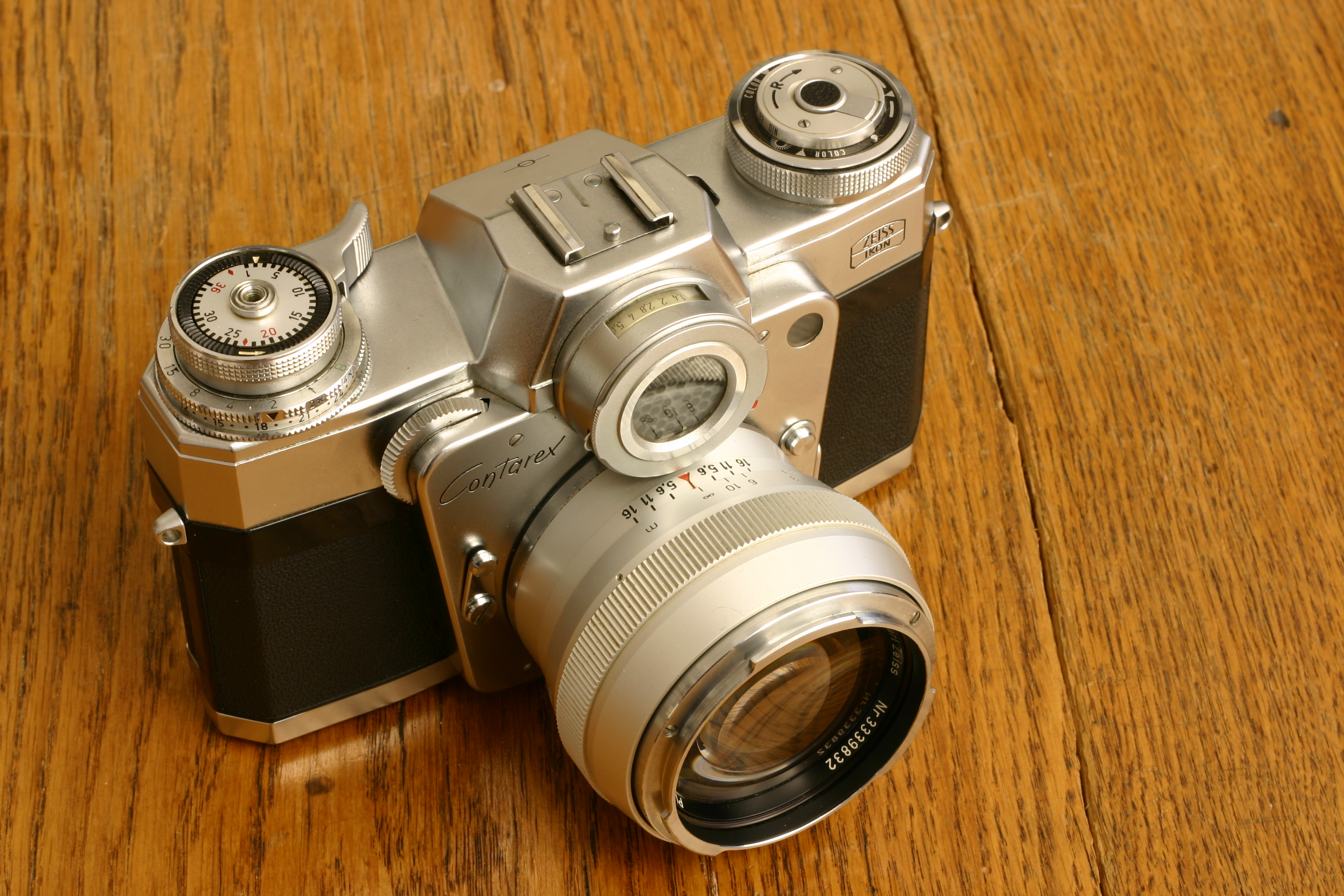
The Contarex with Planar 55 mm f/1.4

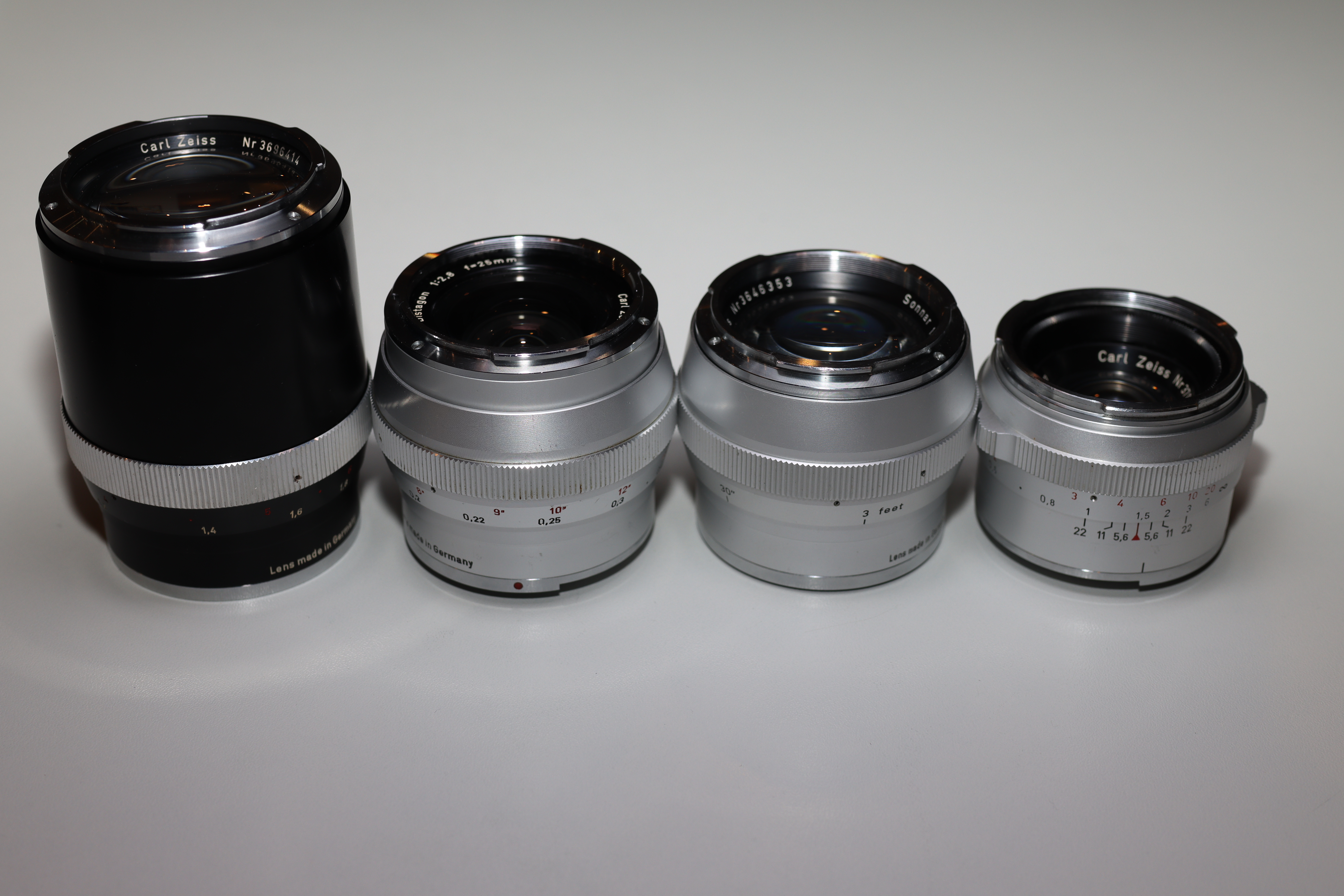
From left, Sonnar 135 mm f/2.8, Distagon 25 mm f/2.8, Sonnar 85 mm f/2, Planar 50 mm f/2

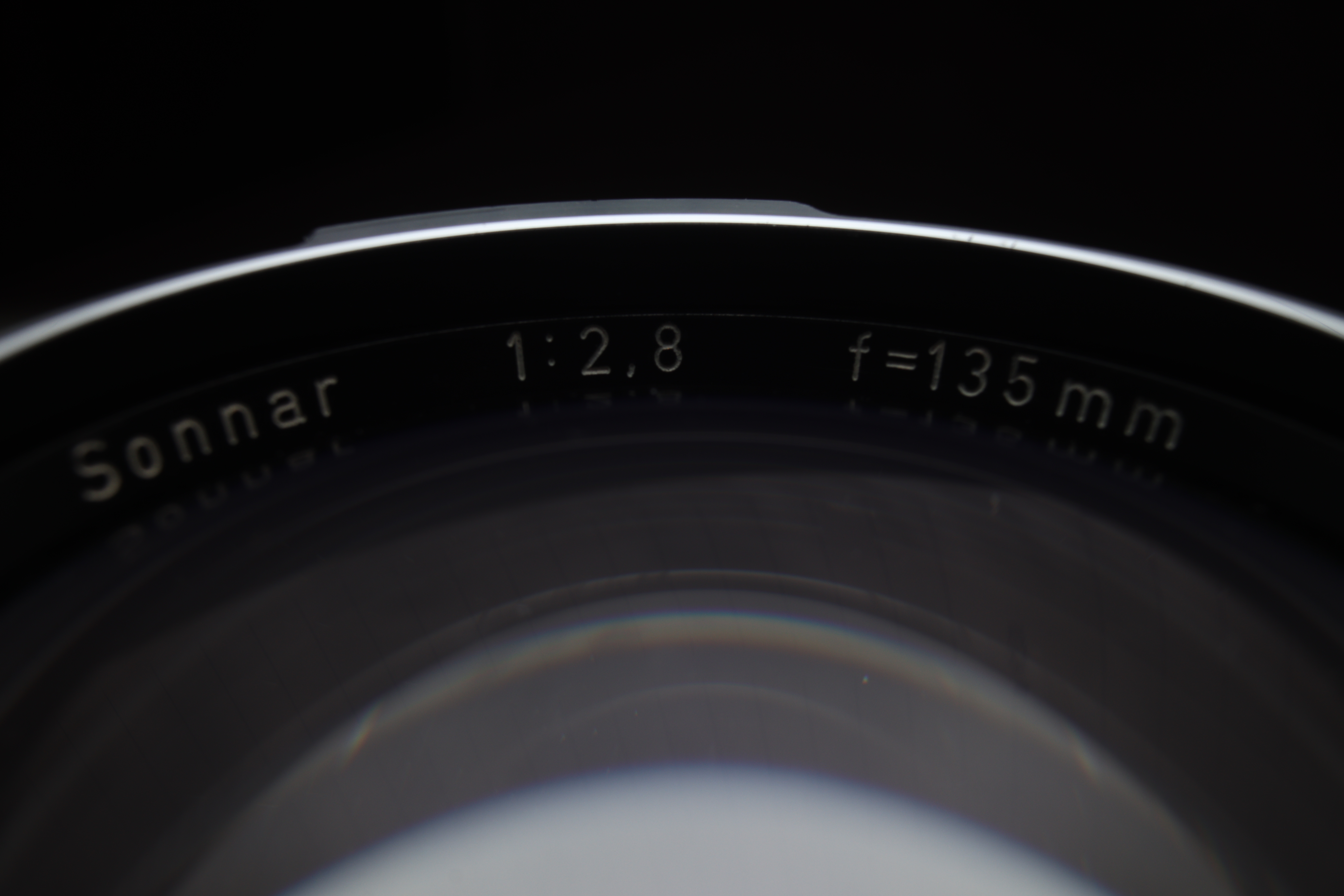
Sonnar 135 mm f/2.8 inside front of lens info

These are all the first-party lenses for the Contarex system; all but one (the PA-Curtagon) were designed and manufactured by Carl Zeiss. Noted Leica historian Erwin Puts obtained the Modulation Transfer Function curves for many of the lenses designed by Zeiss and published them on his website, noting "the special smoothness and depth of the Contarex lenses can be explained by these [MTF] curves. The characteristics of the Contarex lenses are reminiscent of the Hasselblad lenses. Stopped down a bit they exhibit a remarkable finesse of gradation and depth. They may not be the sharpest lenses ever, but the rendition of shape outlines and surface details is most pleasing and subtle like a poem." Marco Cavina compared two rare Contarex lenses (the S-Planar macro lens and Vario-Sonnar 40~120) in 2008 with newer counterparts made for the Contax SLRs built by Yashica/Kyocera, hailing the older lenses as providing "very beautiful and satisfactory results" while lamenting the awkward operation of the Contarex camera bodies.

Contarex Lenses
Lens		FL (mm)	Aperture	Construction		Date released	Notes / Refs.
Name	Catalog	FL (mm)	Aperture	Ele	Grp	Date released	Notes / Refs.
Fisheye lenses
F-Distagon	(11.2442)	16	f/2.8	8	7	1973	Internal filter turret; limited production (est. 150)
Ultra wide angle lenses
Distagon	(11.2440)	15	f/3.5	13	13	1972	Two prototypes produced; design licensed to Asahi Optical (Pentax)
Distagon	(11.2418)	18	f/4	10	9	1967	Requires bayonet filter adapter for B96
Biogon	(11.2402)	21	f/4.5	8	5	1958	Requires mirror lock-up
Wide-angle lenses
Distagon	(11.2408)	25	f/2.8	8	7	1963	
Distagon	(11.2414)	35	f/2	10	9	1965	
Distagon	(11.2403)	35	f/4	8	7	1958	1960 block diagram shows 7e/4g design
PA-Curtagon	(11.2430)	35	f/4	7	6	1967	Manufactured by Schneider, with shift function for perspective control
Blitz Distagon	(11.2413)	35	f/4	8	7	1966	Optically identical to earlier 35/4, but with black finish
Normal lenses
Planar	(11.2401)	50	f/2	6	4	1957	
Tessar	(11.2501)	50	f/2.8	4	3	1960	
Blitz Planar	(11.2412)	50	f/2	6	4	1965	Optically identical to earlier 50/2 Planar, but with black finish
S-Planar	(11.2415)	50	f/4	6	4	1963	Macro lens with focus limited to between 24 and 60 cm (9.4 and 23.6 in)
Planar	(11.2407)	55	f/1.4	7	5	1961	
Portrait (medium telephoto) lenses
Planar	(11.2444)	85	f/1.4	6	5	1974	More commonly found with QBM mount for Rolleiflex SL35
Sonnar	(11.2404)	85	f/2	7	3	1958	
Sonnar	(11.2405)	135	f/4	4	3	1958	
Olympia-Sonnar	(11.2409)	135	f/2.8	4	4	1964	
Telephoto lenses
Olympia-Sonnar	(11.2425)	180	f/2.8	4	4	1966	
Sonnar	(11.2406)	250	f/4	4	4	1959	Manual diaphragm
Olympia-Sonnar	(11.2421)	250	f/4	4	4	1963	Easily distinguished from earlier variant by focus knob
Tele-Tessar	(11.2434)	400	f/5.6	4	4	1970	
Mirotar	(11.2420)	500	f/4.5			1964?	
Mirotar	(11.2422)	1000	f/5.6			1964	
Macro lenses (req. bellows)
Tessar	(11.2417)	115	f/3.5	4	3	1962	
Zoom lenses
Vario-Sonnar	(11.2423)	40-120	f/2.8	13	9	1966	
Vario-Sonnar	(11.2424)	85-250	f/4	15	11	1966	
