= Ground glass =

Glass with roughened surface

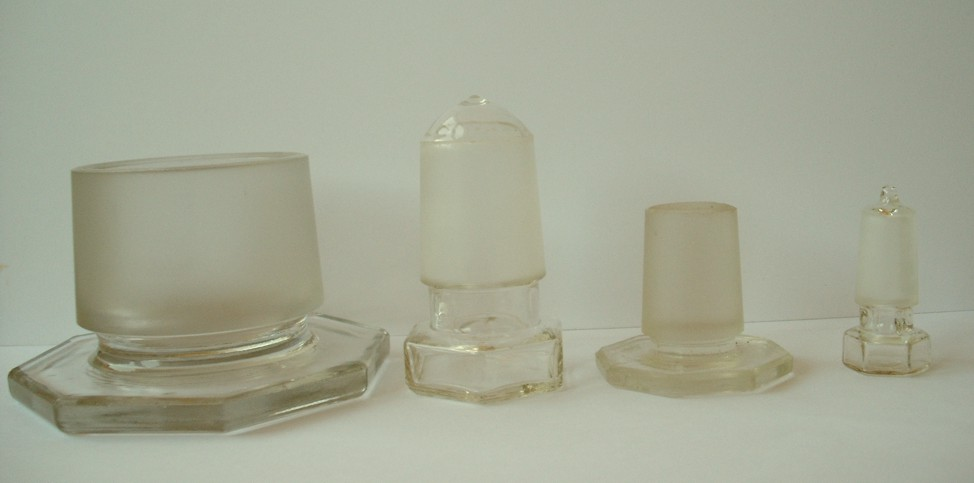
Ground glass stoppers

Ground glass is glass whose surface has been ground to produce a flat but rough (matte) finish, in which the glass is in small sharp fragments.

Ground glass surfaces have many applications, ranging from ornamentation on windows and table glassware to scientific uses in optics and laboratory glassware.

== Uses ==
=== Photography ===
In photography, a sheet of ground glass is used for the manual focusing in some still and movie cameras; the ground-glass viewer is inserted in the back of the camera, and the lens opened to its widest aperture. This projects the scene on the ground glass upside down. The photographer focuses and composes using this projected image, sometimes with the aid of a magnifying glass (or loupe). In order to see the image better, a dark cloth is used to block out light, whence came the image of the old-time photographer with his head stuck under a large black cloth.

A ground glass is also used in the reflex finder of an SLR or TLR camera.

In motion-picture cameras, the ground glass is a small, usually removable piece of transparent glass that sits between the rotary disc shutter and the viewfinder. The ground glass usually contains precise markings to show the camera operator the boundaries of the frame or the center reticle, or any other important information. Because the ground glass is positioned between the mirror shutter and the viewfinder, it does not interfere with the image reaching the film and is therefore not recorded over the final image, but rather serves as a reference for the camera operator.

Ground glasses commonly serve as a framing reference for a desired aspect ratio. Because most films shot with spherical lenses are shot full-frame and later masked during projection to a more widescreen aspect ratio, it is important not only for the operator to be able to see the boundaries of that aspect ratio, but also for the ground glass to be properly aligned in the camera so that the markings are an exact representation of the boundaries of the image recorded on film.

=== Lighting ===
Ground or frosted glass is widely used as a weather- and heat-proof light diffuser in ambient lighting, namely on glass covers or enclosures for lamp fixtures, and sometimes on incandescent bulbs. Its functions include reducing glare and preventing retinal damage by direct sight of the lamp filament. This hides unsightly details of the lamp and fixture without blocking its light, yielding a softer illumination without giving hard shadows.

=== Chemistry ===
Ground glass surfaces are often found on the glass equipment of chemical laboratories.

Glass flasks, stoppers, valves, funnels, and tubing are often connected together by ground glass joints, matching pairs of conical or spherical surfaces that have been ground to a precise shape.

Flasks and test tubes often have a small ground-glass label area on the side. (Pencil writing on ground glass is largely inert, rub-proof and waterproof, but can be easily erased.)

=== Technical optics ===
An optical microscope may include a ground- or frosted-glass diffuser to evenly illuminate the field behind the specimen. Microscope slides are often ground on the sides and beveled on the corners to soften the edges for safer handling.

== Abrin ==
Popular belief for many centuries is that ground-up glass (i.e., glass broken into tiny fragments) can kill if swallowed. In fact, this is a myth, as it is largely ineffective.

The Guy de Maupassant short story "La Confession" concerns a jealous girl who poisons her older sister's suitor by inserting ground-up glass into cake.

The term "ground glass", as it relates to poisoning, is a corruption of grain d'église, the term given by the French in India to the seeds of the jaquirity or rosary pea plant (Abrus precatorius). The seeds contain the extremely toxic lectin abrin, whose toxicity is over 30 times that of ricin. These seeds have been used in India to kill cattle, and in homicides. Captain F. C. Briggs, adjutant to General Reginald Dyer, died of 'powdered glass' poisoning before he could give evidence to the Hunter Commission examining the Jallianwalla Bagh massacre.

== See also ==
- Focusing screen
- Frosted glass
- Ground glass hepatocyte
- Ground glass joints
- Ground-glass opacity
