= FC Zorky Krasnogorsk =

FC Zorky Krasnogorsk may refer to:

- FC Zorky Krasnogorsk (men)
- FC Zorky Krasnogorsk (women)

== See also ==
- Zorky Krasnogorsk, a bandy club
- Zorky (disambiguation)
