= G-mount =

G-mount or G mount may refer to:

- Contax G-mount, an electronic bayonet lens mount for autofocus rangefinder cameras introduced by Kyocera in 1994
- Nikon G-mount, a variant of the Nikon F-mount
- Fujifilm G-mount, a medium-format mirrorless camera mount introduced by Fujifilm in 2017
