= Zorky (disambiguation) =

Zorky , Zorki, or Zorkiy (Russian: Зоркий) may refer to:

== Sports ==
- Zorky Krasnogorsk, men's bandy club based in Krasnogorsk, Russia
- Zorky Krasnogorsk (women), women's bandy club based in Krasnogorsk, Russia
- FC Zorky Krasnogorsk (men)
- FC Zorky Krasnogorsk (women)
- Zorky Stadium

== Other ==
- Russian destroyer Zorky (1904)
- Soviet corvette Zorky, a Grisha-class corvette
- Soviet destroyer Zorky
- Zorki, a series of 35mm rangefinder cameras manufactured in the Soviet Union between 1948 and 1978
  - Zorki 1
  - Zorki 4

== See also ==
- Zorkaya
