= Zorki =

Soviet 35mm rangefinder camera

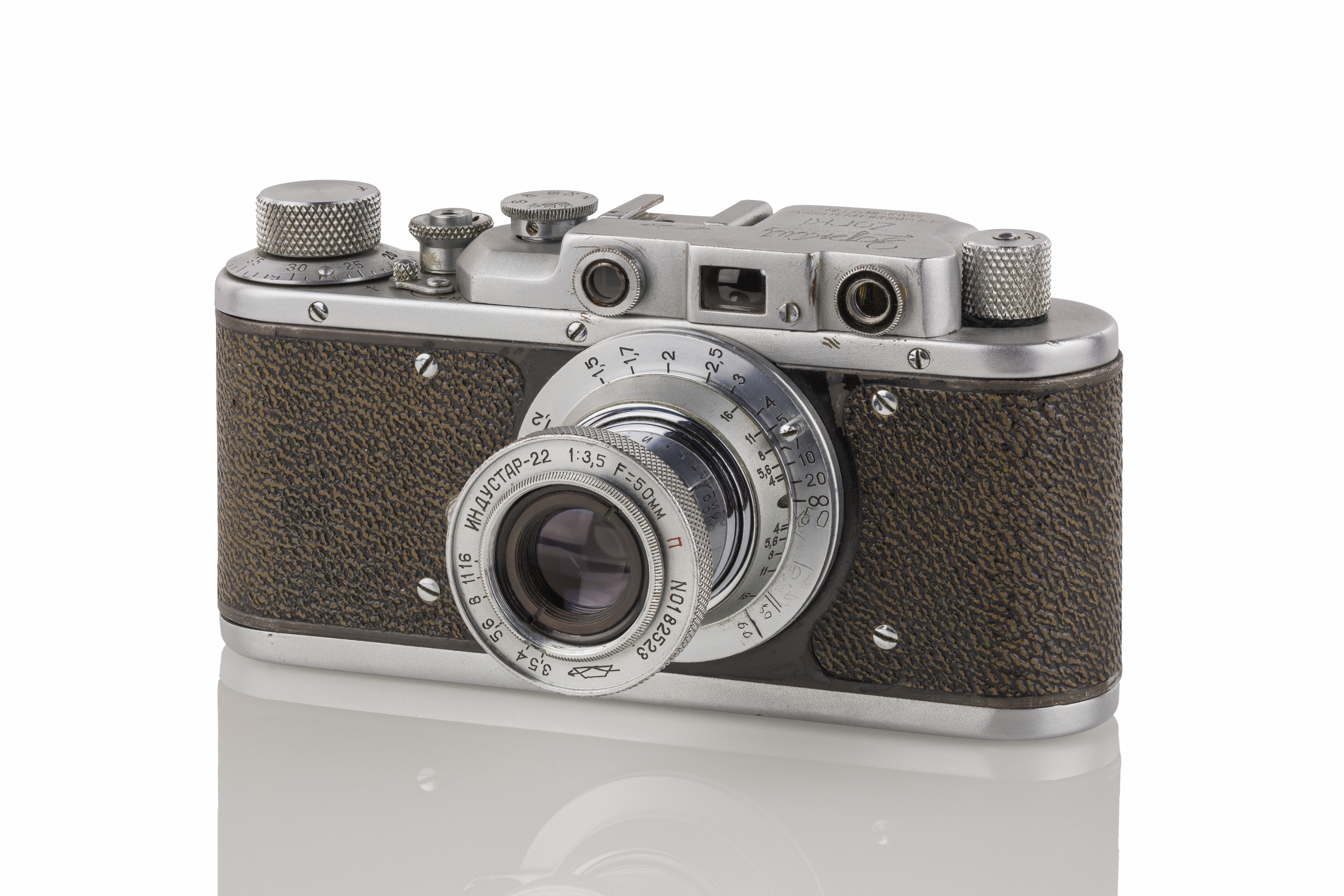
Zorki 1D, 1955 (serial number 5500023)

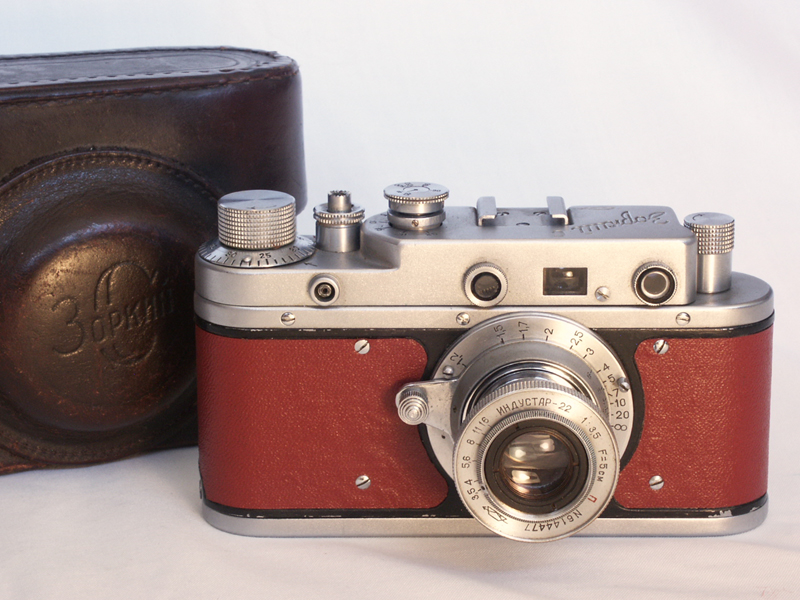
Zorki S, 1955

Zorki (Russian: Зоркий, meaning sharp-sighted) is a series of 35mm rangefinder cameras manufactured in the Soviet Union between 1948 and 1978.

The Zorki was a product of the Krasnogorsk Mechanical Factory (KMZ), which also produced the Zenit single lens reflex camera (SLR). The first Zorki cameras are inexpensive Leica II copies just like the FED, but later models are considerably different from the Leica.

When using most Zorki cameras, the shutter speed should only be set after the shutter has been cocked. Setting the shutter speed before the shutter is cocked can permanently damage the camera. This especially affects all Zorki cameras with slow shutter speeds under 1/30 of a second, in particular the Zorki-3 and Zorki-4.

== Models ==
=== Zorki/Zorki 2 ===
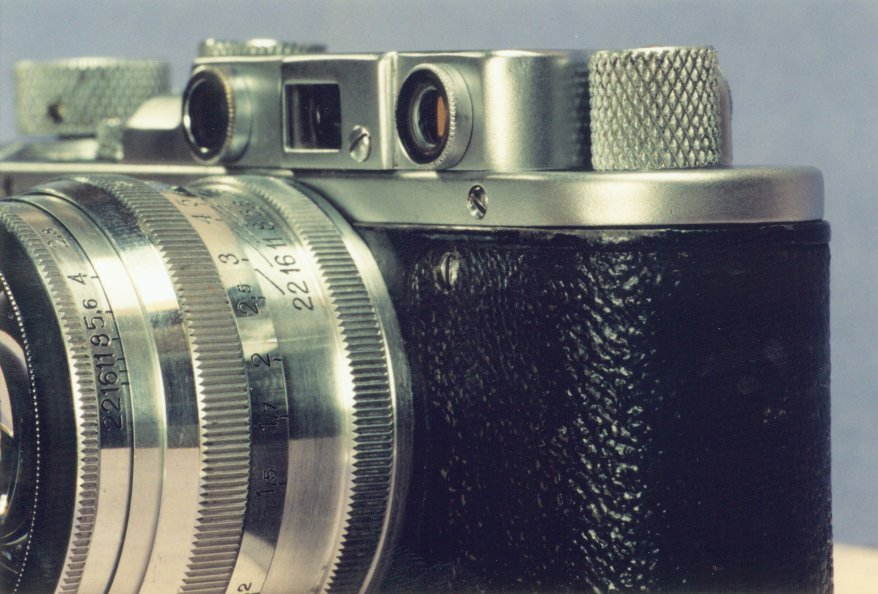
Zorki with Jupiter-8 lens mounted.

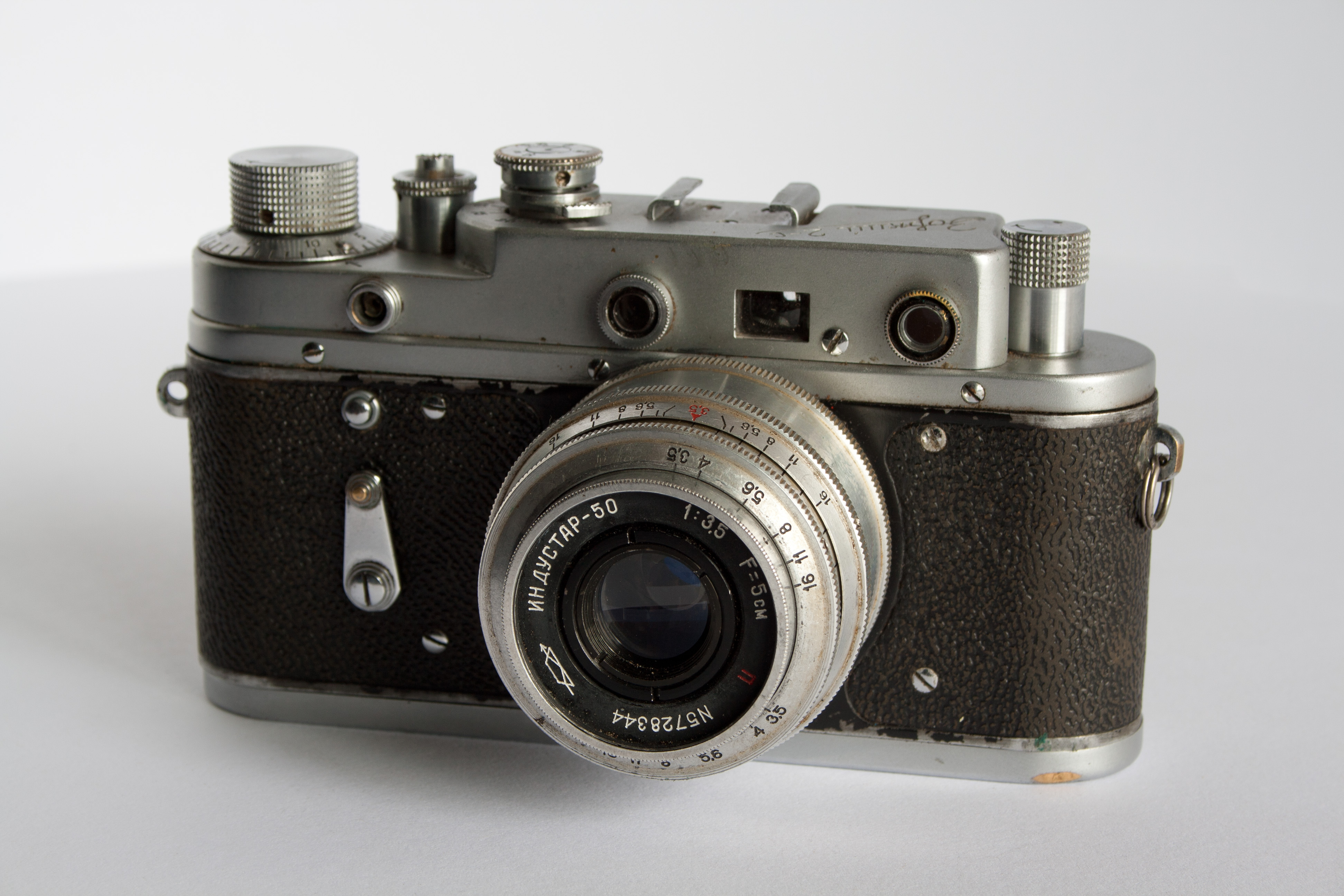
Zorki 2-s with Industar-50 lens

The first Zorki was the Zorki (called "Zorki 1" by some for clarity, although it never had a number in the name), an exact copy of the 1932 Leica II rangefinder. It featured a 50mm f/3.5 Industar-22 lens, a collapsible lens which looked like the Leitz Elmar but is actually a copy of the Zeiss Tessar. Introduced in 1948, the "Zorki" was the first 35mm camera made by KMZ. The Zorki S of 1955 added flash synchronization.

The Zorki 2 (1954) is similar to the Zorki but features an updated rewind mechanism, a self timer and strap lugs. There is a later flash version called the Zorki 2S.

=== Zorki 3 ===
Introduced in 1951, the Zorki 3 is somewhat similar to the Leica III. It offers a number of improvements over the original Zorki, including a large combined viewfinder with the rangefinder builtin, a removable back, and a larger and faster Jupiter-8 (Zeiss Sonnar copy) lens. It also adds a new mechanism for slow shutter speeds with a separate selector dial on the front of the camera. This mechanism was unreliable, so the improved Zorki 3M of 1954 (also produced in 1955) combines all of the shutter speeds on a single dial. The Zorki 3S, introduced in 1955, is a Zorki 3M with flash sync.

=== Zorki 4 ===
The Zorki 4, 1956, is a Zorki 3S with self timer added. The Zorki 4K is identical but used an advance lever instead of the old-style wind knob. With over 2 million units produced, the Zorki 4 is the most successful Zorki and has a reputation as one of the best Russian cameras, although the self timer and slow shutter speeds are unreliable. The Zorki Mir of 1959 is a lower-cost Zorki 4 with fewer shutter speeds.

=== Zorki 35M ===
The Zorki-35M full-frame 35mm coupled-rangefinder camera is from a project undertaken by KMZ designer N. Marienkov during the late 1960s (the "M" is his "signature" camera; he also designed the Zorki 3M and the Zenit 3M). It is based on the body of the Zenit E and some of the advanced design features of the Zenit D, but is a rangefinder rather than SLR camera. It features bright-line frames in the viewfinder for 50mm and 85mm lenses, with the entire field of the viewfinder corresponding to that of a 35mm lens. Other advances include automatic parallax compensation, speeds from 1 to 1/1000 sec. and a modern body design. It was probably an attempt to make an updated alternative for the then aging Zorki 4. At least two hand-built prototypes of this camera are known to exist, and the KMZ archives list it as a "project", but it never went into production.

=== Zorki 5/6 ===
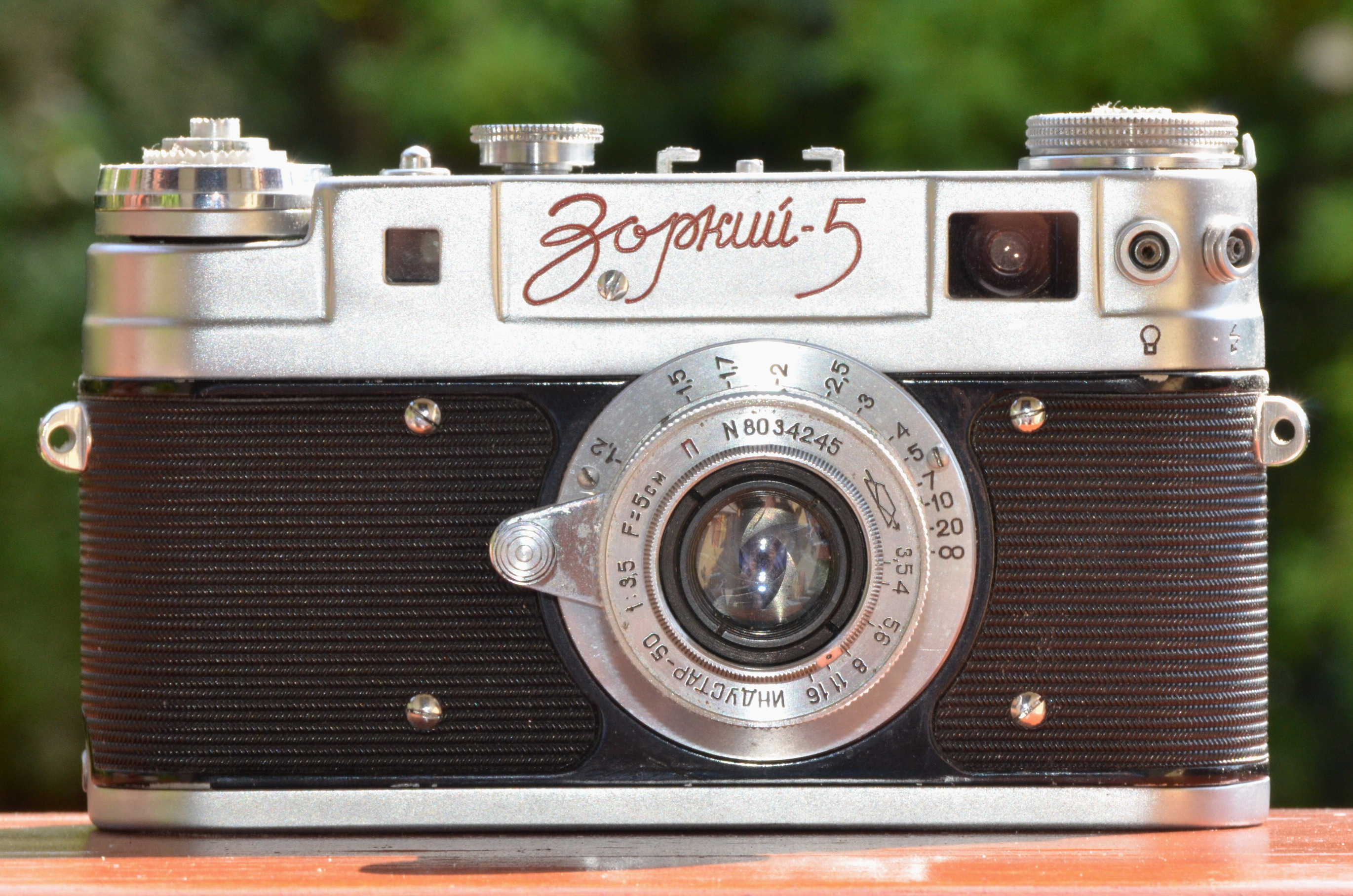
"Zorki-5" with Industar-50 1:3,5 F=5cm lens

The Zorki 5 is an updated model similar to the FED 2. There are two different versions, the first (1958) having an Industar-22 lens and the second (1959) having an Industar-50. Like early Leicas, the Zorki 5 is loaded with film by removing the bottom plate. However, both versions of the Zorki 5 have a flaw where cycling the shutter with no lens on the camera causes the rangefinder arm to get caught up in the shutter mechanism, possibly breaking the camera in the process. The Zorki 6 fixed this problem with the Zorki 5 by moving the rangefinder arm to the other side of the lens mount and introduced an Zenit-style swing back for easier loading.

=== Zorki 10/11/12 ===
The Zorki 10 is a modern-style 35mm rangefinder camera with a selenium light meter and shutter priority automatic exposure introduced in 1964. The Zorki 11 is a cheaper model without the rangefinder, and the Zorki 12 is a variant using Agfa's Rapid film cartridges. All three variants have fixed (non-interchangeable) lenses.

The Zorki 10 is a fixed-lens Zorki coupled rangefinder camera with an integrated light meter. Selenium meter cells surround the lens. This was the first fully automatic camera produced in the former Soviet Union, as well as the first to use ASA/DIN markings rather than the Soviet GOST numbers, however these ASA numbers were still mostly useless as they didn't match any known film speeds (some Zorki 10 cameras apparently had GOST numbers instead of ASA though, as it's shown in a Polish camera manual).

The shutter release is a small lever protruding from the right-hand side of the lens. Shutter speeds from 1/30s to 1/500s are available in automatic mode. It also provides a B (bulb) setting, though there is no way to attach a cable release. Apertures from 2.8 to 22 with constant shutter speed of 1/30 s can be set in manual mode, intended for use with an electronic flash. Flash sync is possible at all shutter speeds through the PC terminal. There is an accessory shoe provided, but it does not sync with flash.

The Zorki 11 is a Zorki 10 without the coupled rangefinder mechanism, but with distance symbols visible in the viewfinder.

Technical specifications:

Film type: 135

Frame size: 24x36 mm

Viewfinder magnification: 0.65x

Rangefinder base: 38 mm

Lens: Industar 63, 45 mm f/2.8 (four element Tessar type)

Angle of view: 51.3 degree

Min. focusing distance: 1.5 m

Shutter: leaf; electronically controlled in auto mode, 1/30 s or B in manual mode.

Exposure metering: external with selenium meter

Shutter speed range: 1/30 s – 1/500 s, B

Aperture range: 2.8 – 22

Automatic exposure range: 8 – 18 EV

Manual exposure range: 8 – 14 EV

Film speed range: 20 – 320 ASA (14 – 26 DIN, 16 – 250 GOST)

Flash sync: 1/30 s

Film advance: manual

Self timer: mechanical, 8-15 s delay

Filter thread: M52.5 x 0.75

Tripod thread: 1/4" or 3/8" (depending on manufacture period)

Dimensions: 129 x 77 x 76 mm

Weight: 750 g

== List of Zorki cameras ==
- Zorki (1948–1956)
- Zorki 3 (1951–1954)
- Zorki 2 (1954–1956)
- Zorki 3M (1954-1955)
- Zorki S (1955–1958)
- Zorki 2S (1955–1960)
- Zorki 3S (1955–1956)
- Zorki 4 (1956–1973)
- Zorki 35M (prototype only, c.1969)
- Zorki 5 (1958–1959)
- Zorki Mir (1959–1961)
- Zorki 6 (1959–1966)
- Zorki 10 (1964)
- Zorki 11 (1964)
- Zorki 12 (1967)
- Zorki 4K (1972–1978)
