= Jupiter (lens) =

Series of camera lenses made in the Soviet Union

The Jupiter (Russian: Юпитер, "Jupiter") series of lenses are Russian camera lenses made by various manufacturers in the former Soviet Union. They were made to fit many camera types of the time, from pre-WWII rangefinders to almost modern SLRs. They are copied from Zeiss pre-WWII designs with incremental improvements, such as coatings, introduced during production. The majority of them are based on Zeiss Sonnar optical scheme, but that's not a rule.

== Jupiter-3 ==
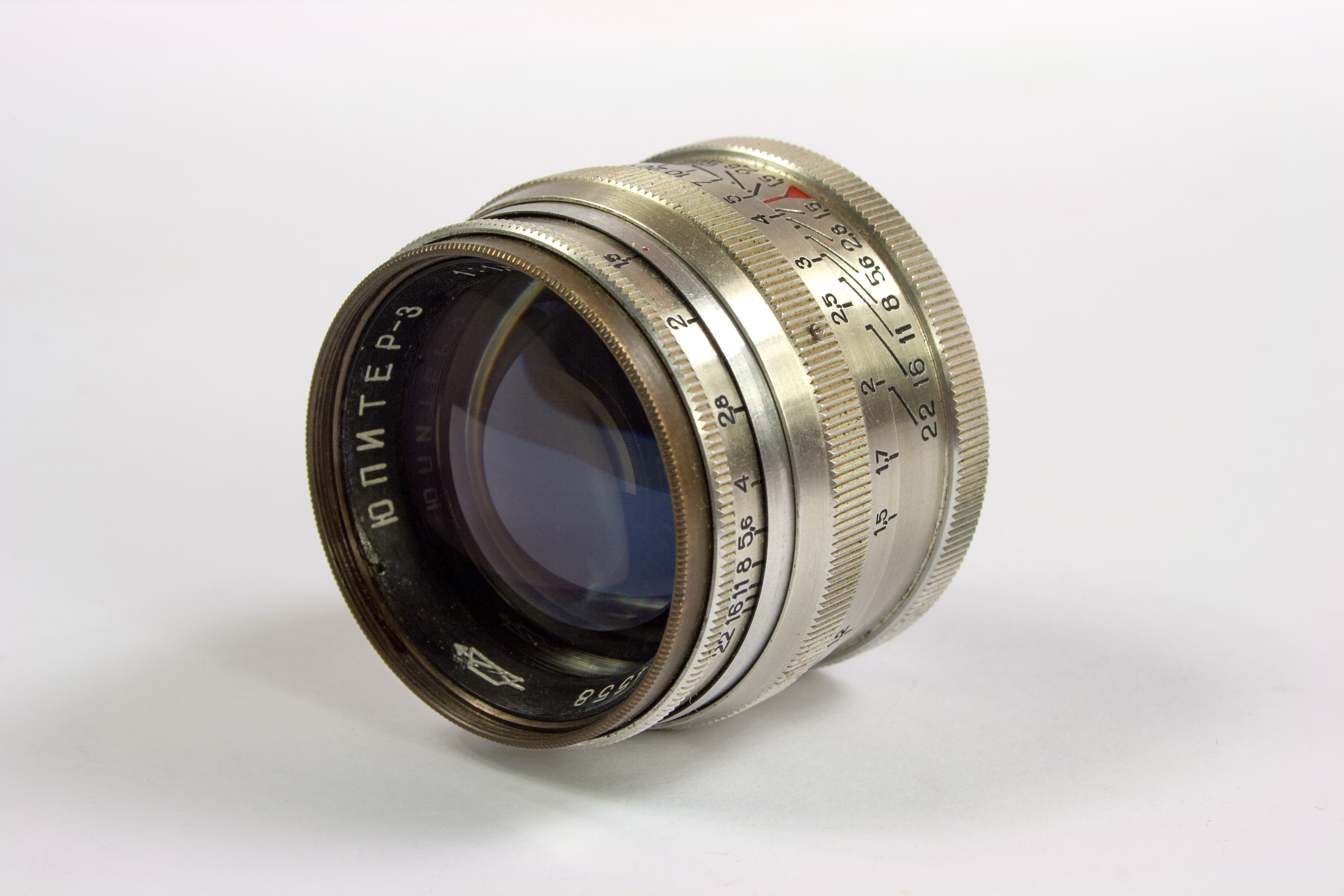
Jupiter-3 50 mm f/1.5 lens

The Jupiter-3 lens is derived from Zeiss Sonnar optical design. It has seven elements in three groups. This lens is the fastest Jupiter lens, having a maximum aperture of f/1.5. The focal length of this lens is 50mm, sometimes also expressed as 5cm.

It was made for two different camera mounts, the Leica thread mount used on Zorki, FED, and some other Soviet rangefinders, and the Contax mount used on Kiev rangefinders. The latter one can be used on all Contax rangefinders, with the former usually needing to be adjusted to properly work on non-Soviet rangefinders using Leica thread mount.

In recent years, a new version of this lens was manufactured by collaboration of the companies Lomography and Zenit. The lens is named Jupiter-3+ and is meant to be used with Leica-style rangefinder cameras (either Leica thread mount or Leica M mount with an adapter), but can also be used with any digital mirrorless camera.

== Jupiter-6 ==
The Jupiter-6 lens is derived from Zeiss Sonnar optical design. The focal length of this lens is 180mm and it has a maximum aperture of f/2.8. The lens is thus a telephoto lens, nowadays usually used for portrait photography.

It's exclusively made for SLR cameras. There are two versions of this lens, namely Jupiter-6 in M39 mount (not to be confused with LTM, this is the SLR version of the mount for early Zenit cameras) and Jupiter-6-2 in M42 mount.

This lens is really big and heavy. It has five elements in three groups. There are rumors that this lens is actually a real Sonnar, even more than the Carl Zeiss Jena Sonnar 2.8 / 180, which is believed to use the redesigned Sonnar optical scheme – Ernostar.

== Jupiter-8 ==
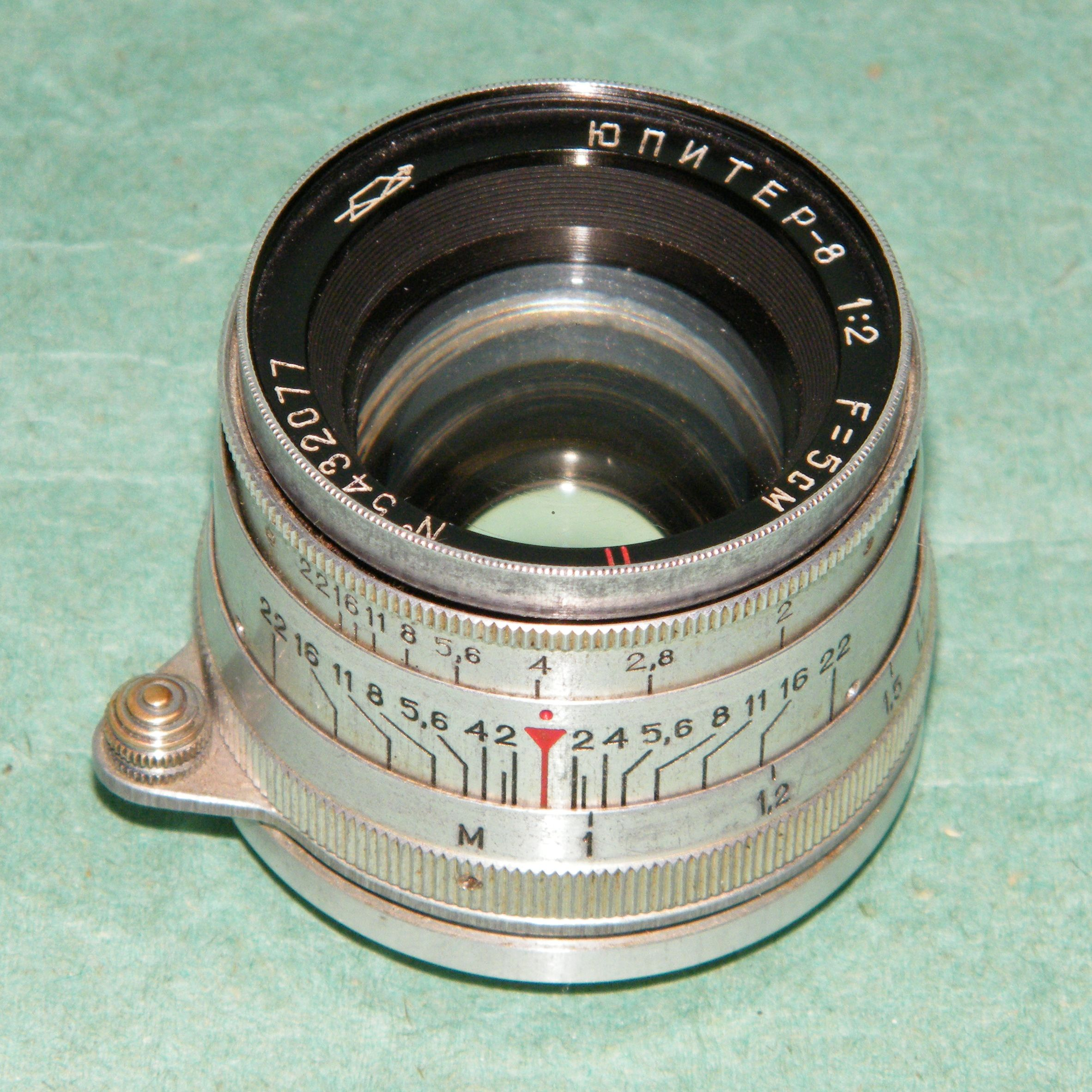
Jupiter-8 50 mm f/2.0 lens

The Jupiter-8 lens is derived from the Zeiss Sonnar design. It has six elements in three groups. It has a focal length of 50mm and a maximum aperture of f/2.0.

It was made for two different camera mounts, the Leica thread mount used on Zorki, FED, and some other Soviet rangefinders, and the Contax mount used on Kiev rangefinders. The latter one can be used on all Contax rangefinders, with the former usually needing to be adjusted to properly work on non-Soviet rangefinders using Leica thread mount. The lens is a standard M39 mount.

Additionally, there existed a modified version of this lens, called the Jupiter-8M. The only difference between the two versions is that the modified version had click-stops on the aperture ring. It was available only in Contax mount for Kiev rangefinders.

A variation of Jupiter-8 lens was the usual standard lens on many Zorki and Kiev cameras, making it a pretty common lens even today.

== Jupiter-9 ==
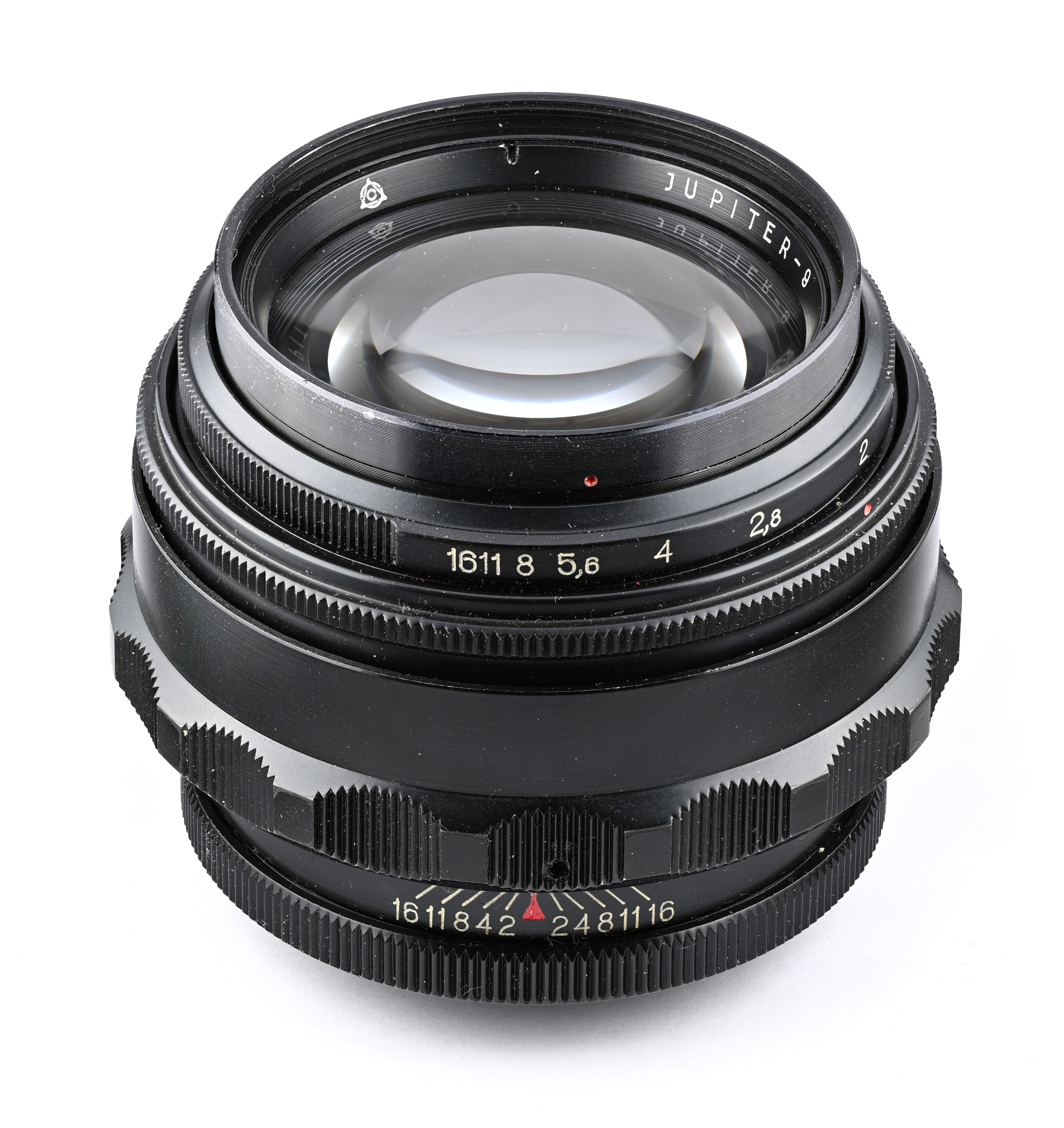
Jupiter-9 85 mm f/2.0 lens with M42 mount for SLRs. Pre-set aperture, no lens coatings, made in 1980.

The Jupiter-9 lens is derived from the Zeiss Sonnar design. It has seven elements in three groups. Its focal length is 85mm, which makes it a short telephoto lens usually used for portrait photography. The maximum aperture of this lens is f/2.0.

It was available in multiple camera mounts. It's most commonly found today in the Leica thread mount used on Zorki, FED, and some other Soviet rangefinders, and the Contax mount used on Kiev rangefinders. The latter one can be used on all Contax rangefinders, with the former usually needing to be adjusted to properly work on non-Soviet rangefinders using Leica thread mount. But this lens was also manufactured in M42 mount, Pentax K-mount, Leica M and proprietary Kiev SLR mount (used on Kiev 10 and Kiev 15 cameras).

== Jupiter-11 ==
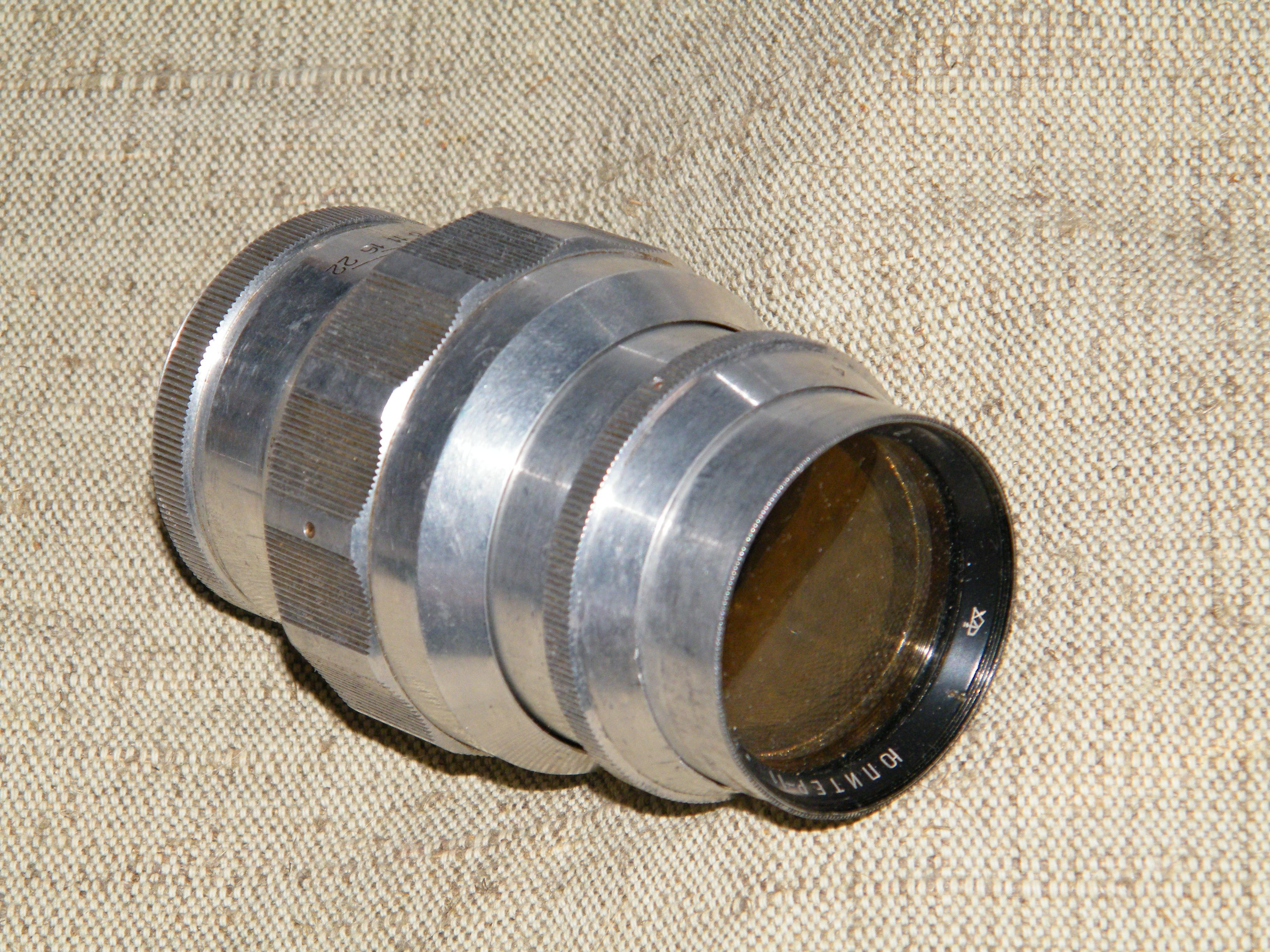
Jupiter-11 135 mm f/4.0 lens

The Jupiter-11 lens is derived from the Zeiss Sonnar design. It has four elements in three groups. Its focal length is 135mm, making it a telephoto lens. The maximum aperture of this lens is f/4.0.

It was available in multiple camera mounts. It's most commonly found today in the Leica thread mount used on Zorki, FED, and some other Soviet rangefinders, and the Contax mount used on Kiev rangefinders. The latter one can be used on all Contax rangefinders, with the former usually needing to be adjusted to properly work on non-Soviet rangefinders using Leica thread mount. But this lens was also manufactured in M42 mount, M39 mount (which shouldn't be confused with Leica thread mount, this is an SLR version of the lens for early Zenit SLRs), and proprietary Kiev SLR mount (used on Kiev 10 and Kiev 15 cameras).

There also existed a variation of the lens called the Jupiter-11A. All the Soviet lenses with -A suffix had interchangeable lens mounts, so the buyer was able to choose the required mount for their lens.

== Jupiter-12 ==
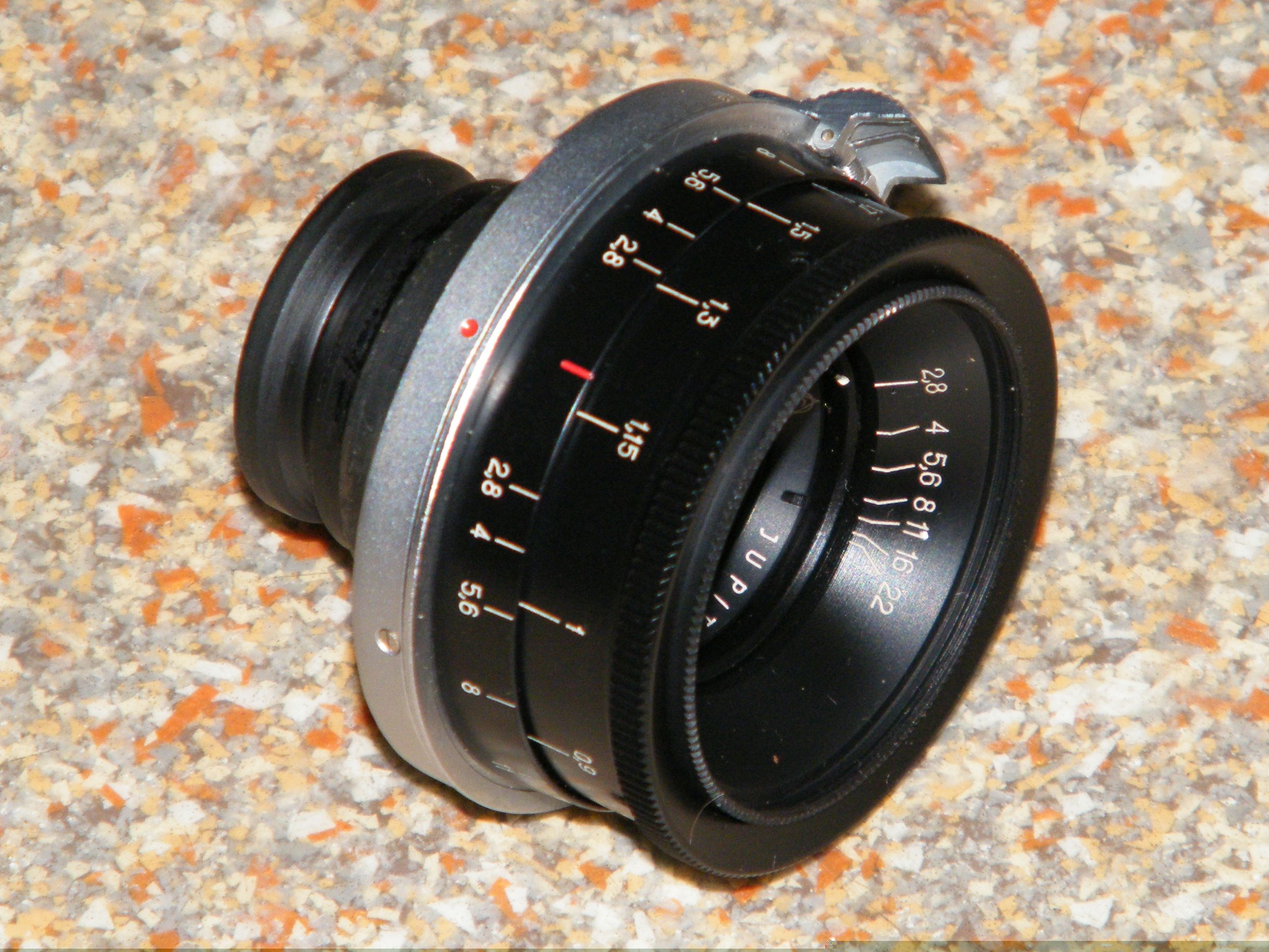
Jupiter-12 35 mm f/2.8 in Contax/Kiev mount

The Jupiter-12 lens is derived from the Zeiss Biogon design. It has six elements in four groups. Its focal length is 35mm and its maximum aperture is f/2.8.

It was made for two different camera mounts, the Leica thread mount used on Zorki, FED, and some other Soviet rangefinders, and the Contax mount used on Kiev rangefinders. The latter one can be used on all pre-war Contax rangefinders, but not the new post-war Contax models, with the former usually needing to be adjusted to properly work on non-Soviet rangefinders using Leica thread mount.

== Jupiter-13 ==
Very little information exists about this lens. It's a large format lens, originally used for aerial photography. It's using the Zeiss Sonnar optical formula. Its focal length is 125mm and its maximum aperture is f/1.5.

== Jupiter-17 ==
This is a lens that was meant to be produced in big quantities to replace Jupiter-8 as the new default lens on Soviet Leica thread mount rangefinders. It never actually got to a point where it was produced, but a few prototypes of this lens exist in collections.

The lens has five elements in four groups. Its focal length is 50mm and its maximum aperture is f/2.0.

== Jupiter-21 ==
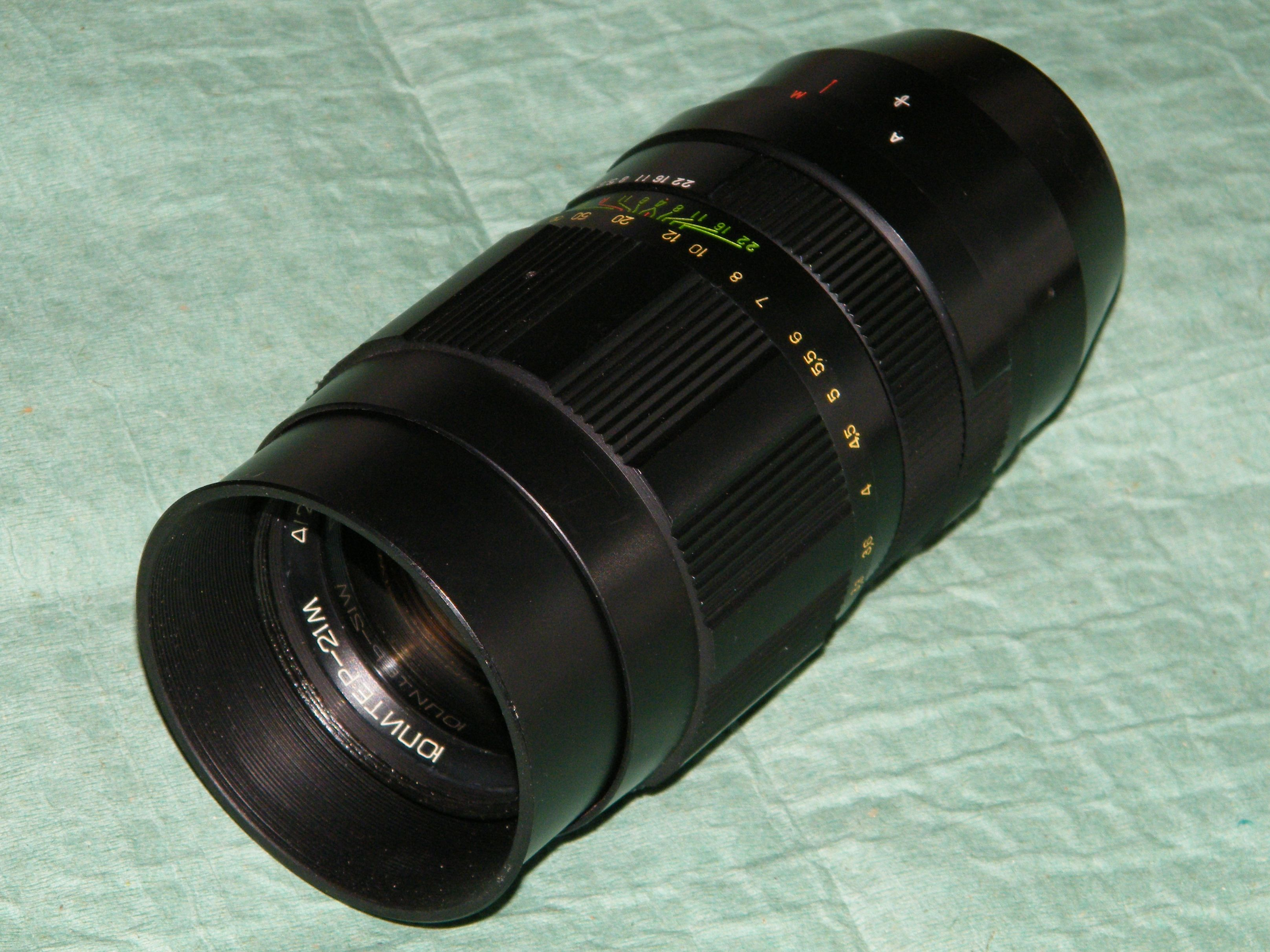
Jupiter-21 200 mm f/4.0 lens

Jupiter-21 is a telephoto lens with focal length of 200mm. Its maximum aperture is f/4.0. The lens was made in multiple mounts and is frequently adapted to modern cameras nowadays.

There are multiple versions of the lens. The most common one is the Jupiter-21M, which has M42 mount. But there were also versions Jupiter-21A and Jupiter-21T. The Latter has T mount and the former is a lens with -A suffix. This means that lens has multiple mounts available and the user can decide which mount the lens uses.

== Jupiter-24 ==
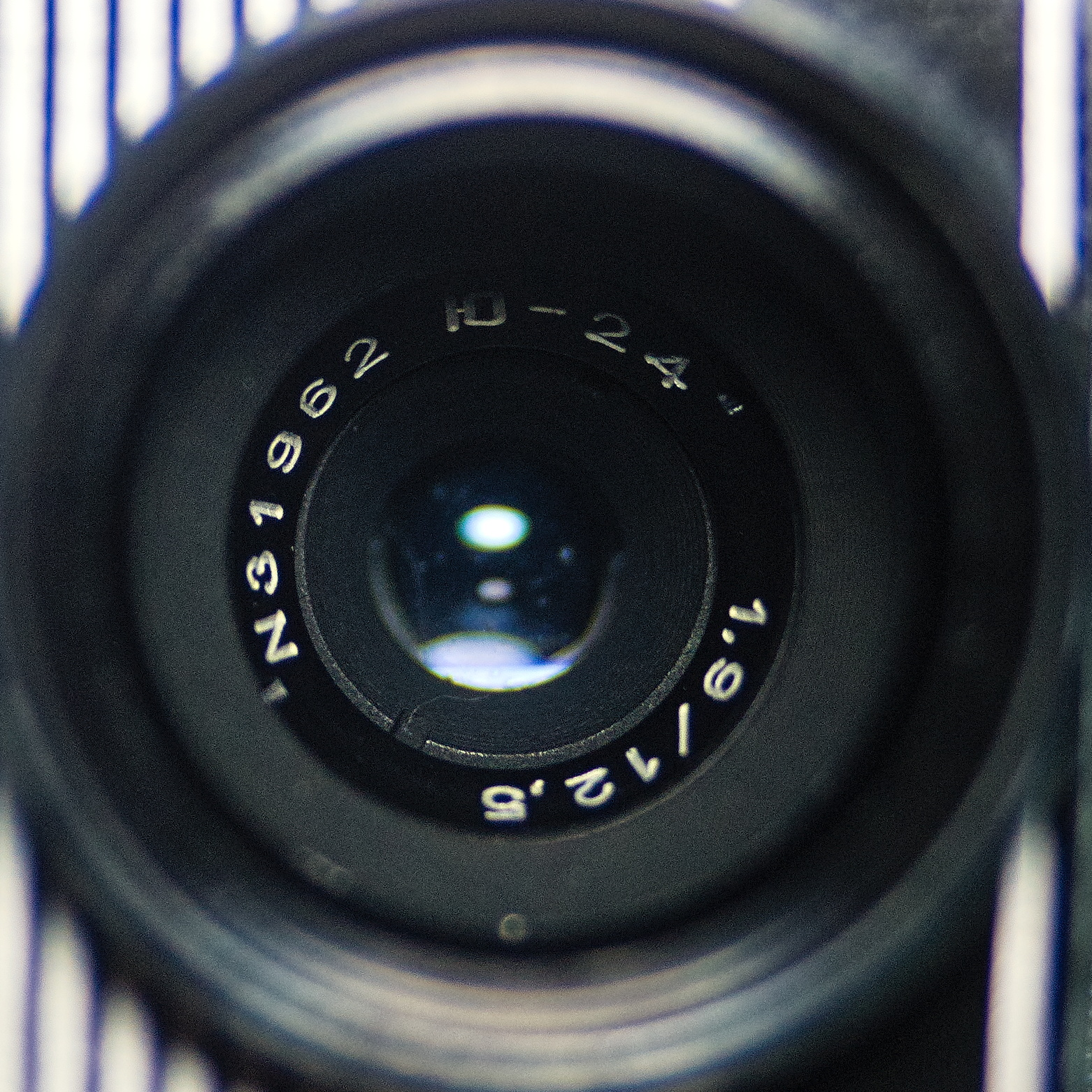
Jupiter-24 on Quartz-1 («Кварц-1» on Russian)

Jupiter-24 is hardwired into Quartz-1 movie camera, a 8 mm motion picture lens with focal length of 12.5 mm and maximum aperture of f/1.9.

== Jupiter-36 ==
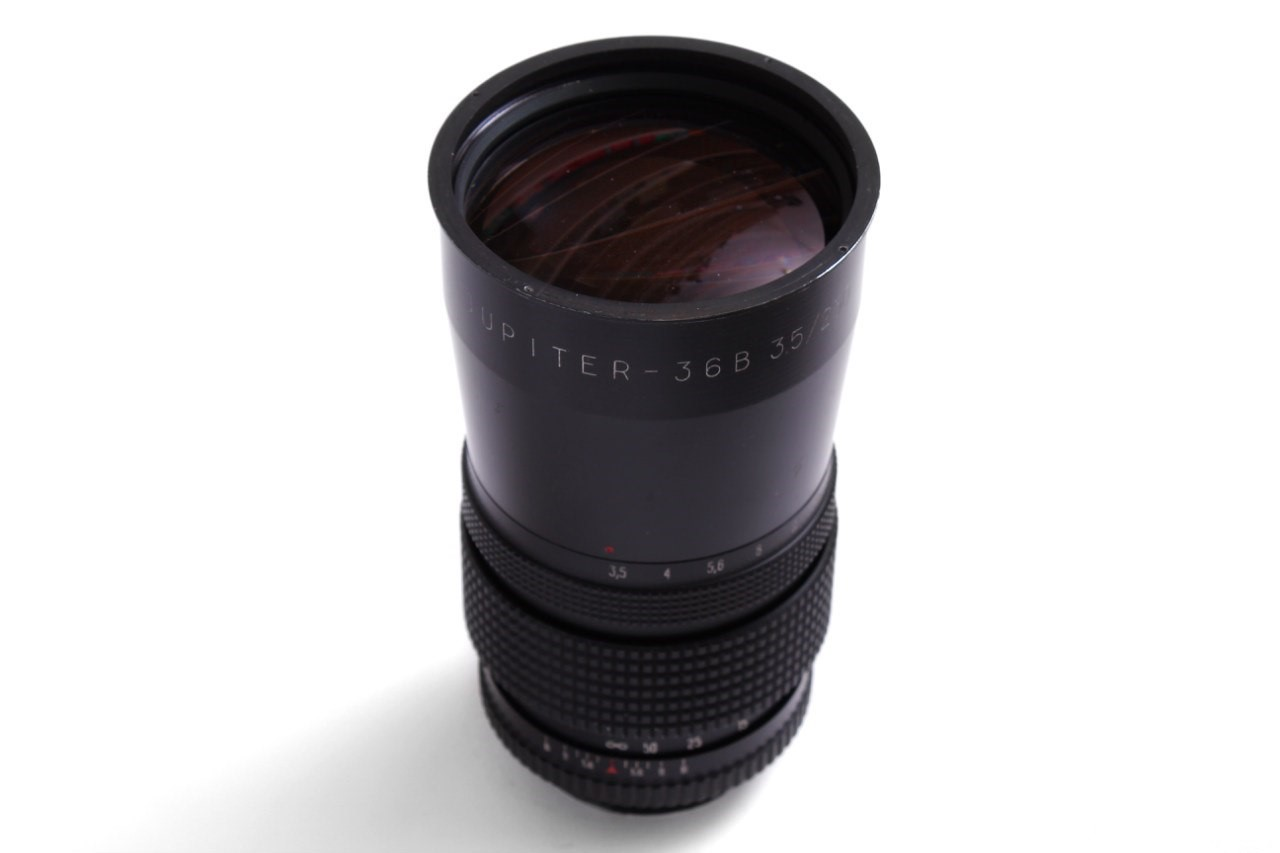
Jupiter-36B 250 mm f/3.5 lens

Jupiter-36 is a medium format lens, produced for Kiev medium format cameras. Two versions of the lens exist. One is named Jupiter-36B and it has Pentacon Six mount - this one was made to be used with Kiev 6C and Kiev 60 medium format cameras. The other version of the lens is Jupiter-36V, which has Hasselblad 1600F mount.

The lens has a focal length of 250mm and a maximum aperture of f/3.5. It's based on Zeiss Sonnar optical scheme. It has 4 elements in 3 groups.

The lens is very heavy (1500g) and doesn't have a tripod socket.

== Jupiter-37 ==
Jupiter-37 is another Sonnar type lens. Its focal length is 135mm and its maximum aperture f/3.5.

The lens exists in a few versions, the most common one being Jupiter-37A. A suffix means this lens has an inter changeable mount. There also exists the Jupiter-37K, with Pentax K mount.

== Jupiter-38 ==
Jupiter-38 is a unique lens. It was used by the traffic police to shoot traffic and various evidence.

Its focal length is 75mm and its maximum aperture is f/4.0. It has M42 lens mount.
