= Zorki 1 =

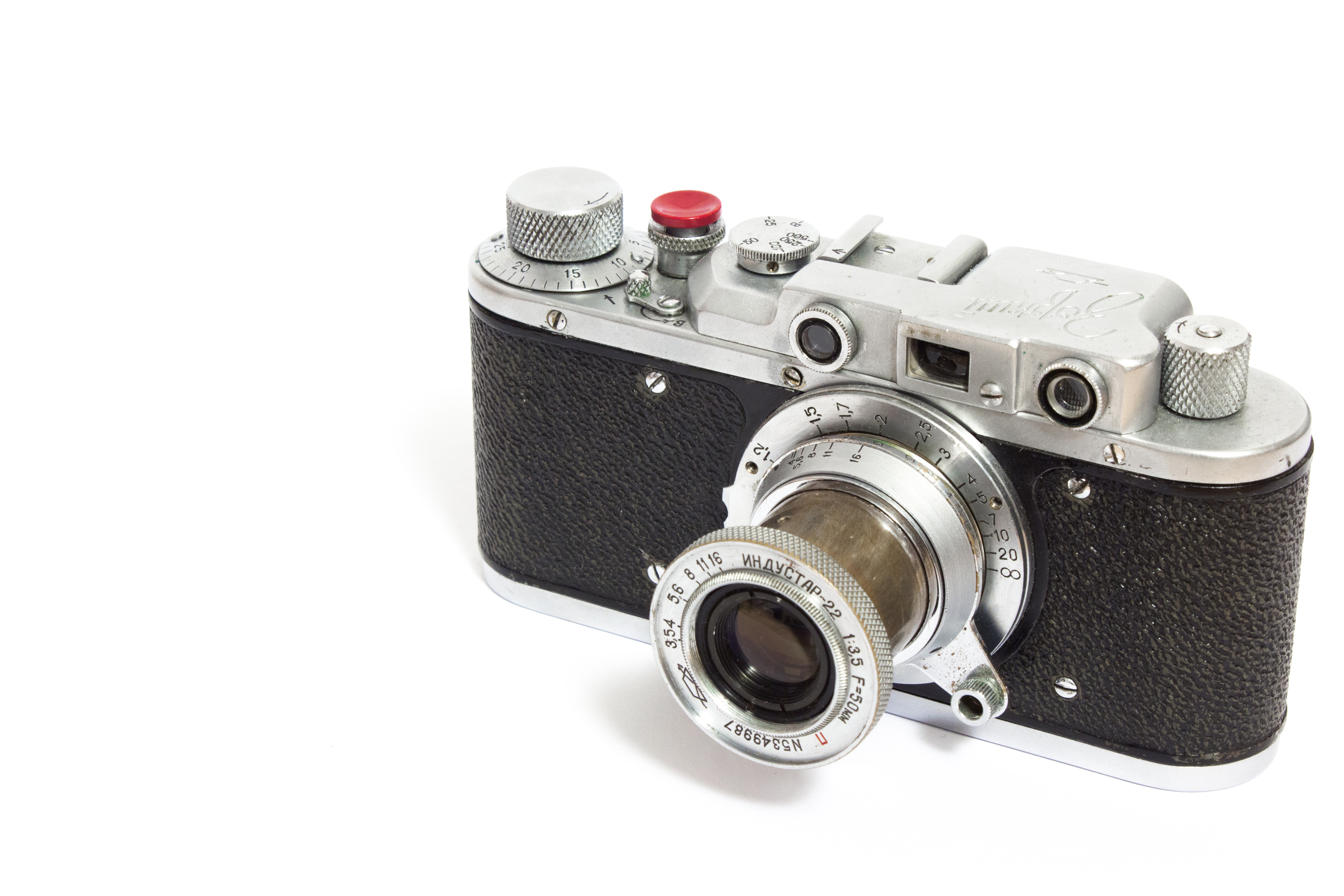

Overview
- Maker: Krasnogorskiy Zavod
- Type: 35 mm rangefinder camera

Focusing
- Focus: manual

Zorki cameras have their roots in the FED line of Leica copies. In 1948, when the FED factory was falling behind its production goals, the KMZ factory in Krasnogorsk, Russia was geared up to produce FED cameras. By 1949, KMZ had made some design changes and started manufacturing the FED-Zorki, which later became known as the Zorki 1.

The Zorki 1 was the first Zorki-branded body produced at the KMZ factory. Some later models have "Zorki" engraved in Cyrillic and in Latin; these are for export and are often referred to as "Zorki-Zorki" bodies on assorted Soviet-camera mailing lists.

The Zorki bodies were manufactured from 1950 to 1956, with 5 different body types.

- Type 1a is a direct descendant of the Fed-Zorki.

- Type 1b has a different collar around the shutter release, allowing for a threaded cable.
- Type 1c has moulded body parts and can be identified by black trims just below the top plate and above the bottom plate.
- In Type 1d, the black trim extends to envelop the lens mount.
- Type 1e has newer shutter speeds of 1/50s and 1/25s, instead of the 1/60s, 1/40s, 1/30s, and 1/20s found in previous types.
