= Zeiss Sonnar =

Photographic lens

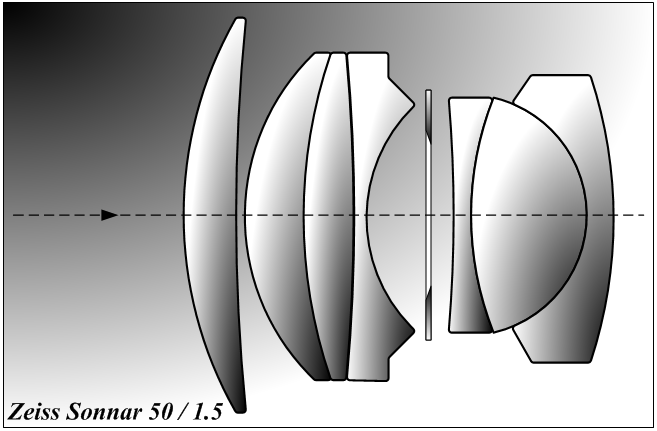
- Introduced in: 1932
- Author: Ludwig Bertele
- Construction: 7 elements in 3 groups
- Aperture: f/1.5 (1932)

The Zeiss Sonnar is a photographic lens originally designed by Dr. Ludwig Bertele in 1929 and patented by Zeiss Ikon. It was notable for its relatively light weight, simple design and fast aperture.

== Naming ==
The name "Sonnar" is derived from the German word "Sonne", meaning sun. It was originally a tradename owned by Nettel Camerawerke in Sontheim am Neckar for a f/4.5 Tessar-like lens. Sontheim's coat of arms includes a symbol of the sun. Nettel merged with August Nagel's Contessa Camerawerke in 1919. The resulting Contessa-Nettel AG in Stuttgart was one of the companies that merged to form the Zeiss Ikon AG in 1926.

When the modern Zeiss lens was designed by Bertele, Zeiss re-used the old Nettel tradename in order to build on the sun association to emphasize on the lens' large aperture (f/2.0), which was much greater than many other lenses available at the time.

== History ==
Sonnar antecedents and evolution

Cooke triplet (Taylor, 1893, per US 568,052)

Ultrastigmat (Minor, 1916, per US 1,360,667)

Ernostar f/2.0 (Bertele, 1923, per US 1,584,271)

Ernostar f/2.0 (Bertele, 1924, per DRP 458,499)

Sonnar f/2.0 (Zeiss Ikon, 1929, per DE 530,843)

Sonnar f/2.0 (Bertele, 1931, per US 1,998,704)

Sonnar f/1.5 (Bertele, 1932, per US 1,975,678)

The Cooke triplet anastigmat, designed by Dennis Taylor and patented in 1893, was modified in 1916 by Charles C. Minor, who added a positive meniscus element to increase the maximum aperture to f/1.9, which was marketed as the Gundlach Ultrastigmat. In parallel, Bertele designed the f/2.0 Ernostar lens, which was released in 1919 with the Ermanox camera. Bertele's Ernostar used two cemented doublets in lieu of the two positive elements in Minor's Ultrastigmat, but this was later simplified to two positive elements in the 1924 German Ernostar patent. In 1926, the Ernemann Company was acquired by Zeiss-Ikon and Bertele continued developing his designs under Zeiss.

The first Zeiss Sonnar, patented in 1929, was a f/2.0 50 mm lens with six elements in three groups and released with the Zeiss Contax I rangefinder camera in 1932. In 1931, Bertele reformulated the Sonnar with seven elements in three groups, allowing a maximum aperture of f/1.5.

Compared to Planar designs the Sonnar had more aberrations, but with fewer glass-to-air surfaces it had better contrast and less flare. Though compared to the earlier Tessar design, its faster aperture and lower chromatic aberration was a significant improvement.

=== Applications and influence ===
Although initially developed as a normal lens with a focal length approximately the same as the frame diagonal, the Sonnar design has been extended to longer and shorter focal lengths. For example, the first Zeiss Biogon, a wide-angle lens for rangefinder cameras with a focal length of 35 mm, was derived by Bertele in 1934 from the improved 1932 Sonnar. However, the Biogon design is incompatible with Single-lens reflex cameras (SLRs) due to the space taken up by an SLR's mirror. For this reason it has been used most commonly in the portrait lens class, starting with the "Olympia" Sonnar of 1936, built as a 2.8/180 mm lens for the Contax rangefinder cameras.

For 35mm film cameras, the portrait lens focal lengths span the range approximately from 85 to 180 mm (1.5–4× the "normal lens" focal length). Sonnar portrait lenses have been released for the 35mm format for both SLR cameras and rangefinders, such as the Sonnar T* 2.8/90 for Contax G cameras. Sonnar portrait lenses also are supplied for larger cameras, most notably the 150 mm and 250 mm lenses for the medium format Hasselblad V-system. Some portrait Sonnar lenses also were made for large format cameras, typically found on technical and press cameras made by Linhof – e.g., Sonnar 1:5.6 250 mm for 9×12 cm (4×5") format. Though these lenses were quite heavy (> 2 kg) and large, they were optimised for working on a full aperture with the same sharpness and contrast as on smaller apertures. The coverage of these lenses was also not as good as many similar focal length lenses which limited the use of camera movements, although movements are not generally too important for portrait work.

The Sonnar design has been extensively copied by other lens manufacturers, due to its excellent sharpness, low production cost and fast speed. For example, the Soviet factory KMZ produced several lenses that used the Sonnar formula: The KMZ Jupiter 3, Jupiter-8, and Jupiter-9 are direct copies of the Zeiss Sonnar 1:1.5 50 mm, 1:2.0 50 mm, and 1:2.0 85 mm, respectively. Some early rangefinder lenses manufactured by Nikon also used the Sonnar design, including the Nikkor-H·C 5 cm f/2 (1946), Nikkor-S·C 8.5 cm f/1.5 (1952), Nikkor-P·C 8.5 cm f/2 (1948), Nikkor-P·C 10.5 cm f/2.5 (1949), and Nikkor-Q·C 13.5 cm f/4 (1946); the 10.5 and 13.5 cm lenses later were slightly modified for the Nikon F mount SLR cameras.

=== Modern developments ===
A zoom lens derivative of the Sonnar, the Vario-Sonnar also exists, in which a number of lens groups are replaced with floating pairs of lens groups.

The Vario-Sonnar is a Carl Zeiss photographic lens design named in relation to the Zeiss Sonnar. This lens type has a variable focal length which can replace a series of lenses for a certain picture format.

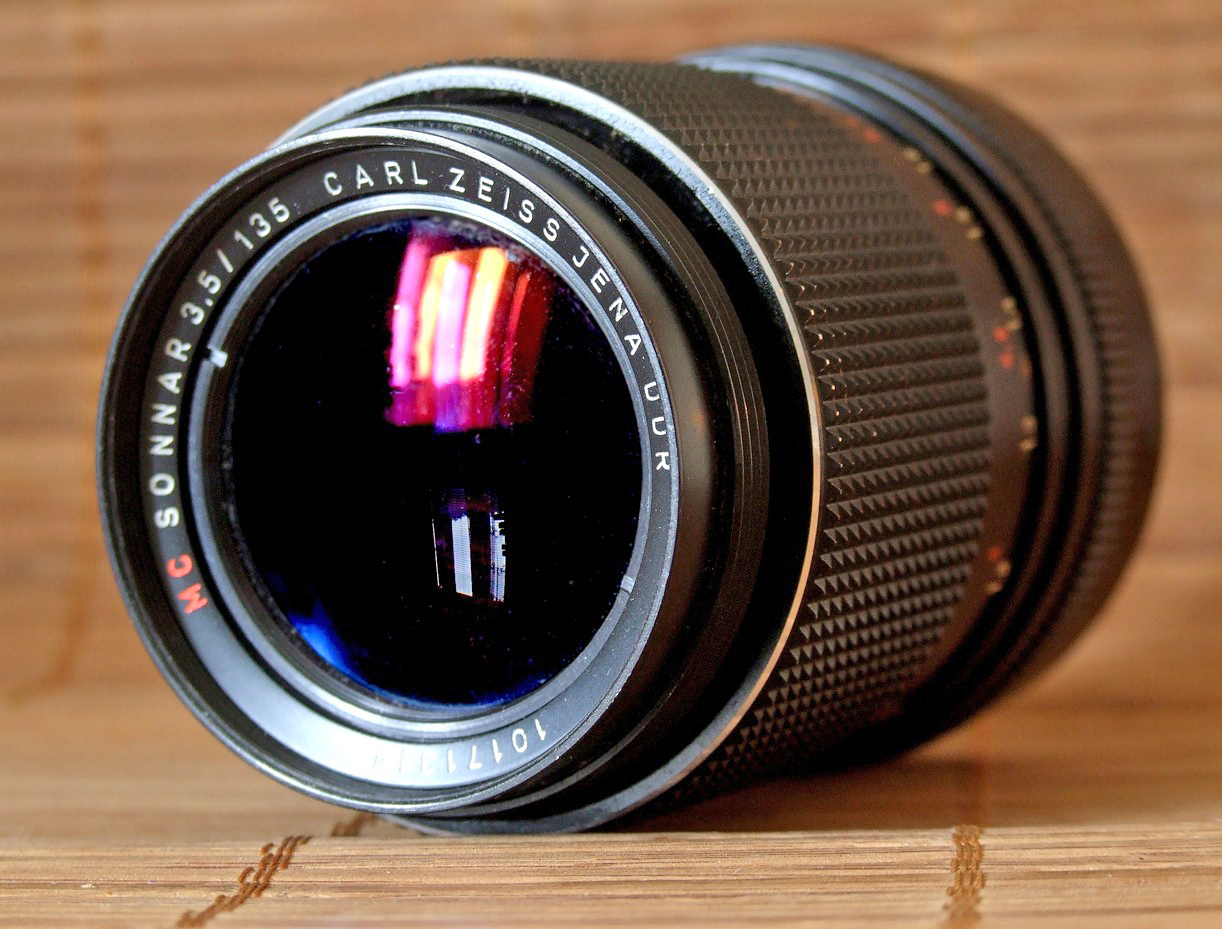
A Sonnar 135 mm f/3.5 from Carl Zeiss Jena

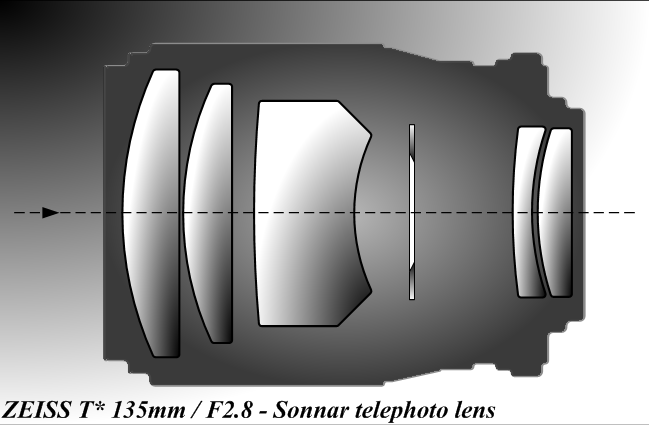
Zeiss Sonnar 135 mm f/2.8 telephoto lens.

== See also ==
- Biotar
- Tessar
- Planar
- Biogon
- Distagon
- Flektogon
- Hologon
- Photographic lens design
