= Contax G =

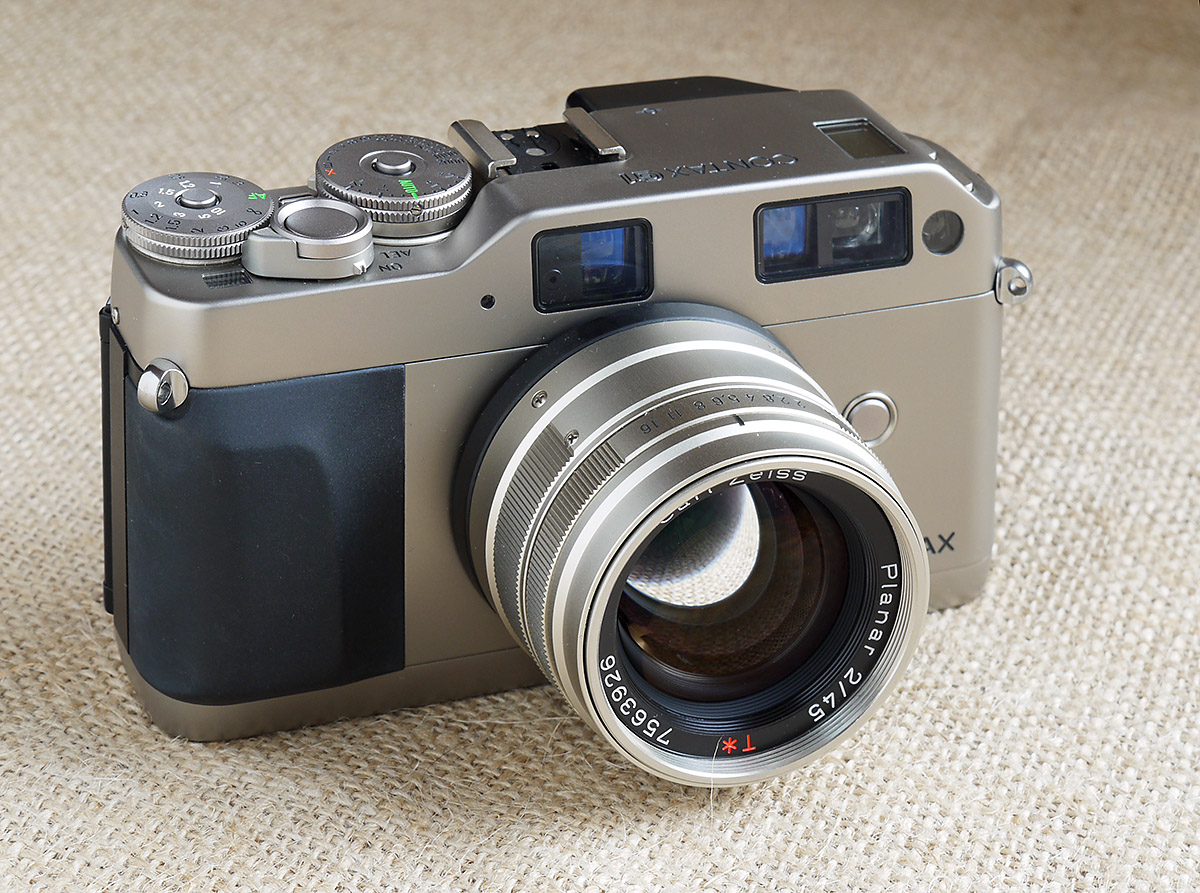
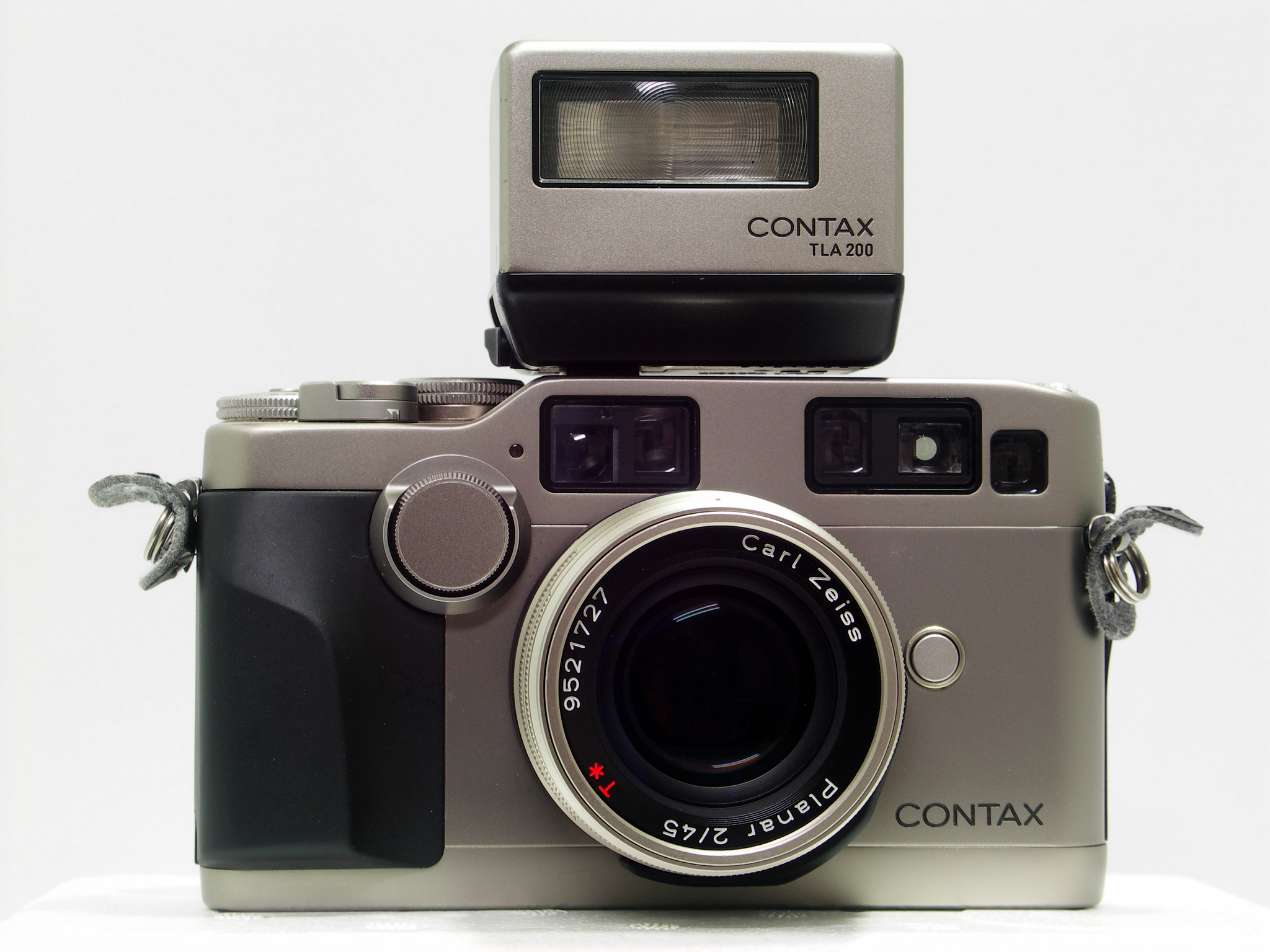

Overview
- Maker: Kyocera
- Type: 35 mm rangefinder camera

Lens
- Lens mount: Contax G-mount

Focusing
- Focus: AF

Exposure/metering
- Exposure: auto

Flash
- Flash: hot shoe

The Contax G camera line consists of two cameras, the G1 and G2, interchangeable-lens cameras sold by Kyocera under the Contax brand in competition with the Leica M7, Cosina Voigtländer Bessa-R, and Konica Hexar RF. The G1 was introduced in 1994 with the G2 joining it in 1996. In 2005, Kyocera retreated from the camera business and announced it would cease all activity related to the manufacture of Contax cameras at the end of the year, effectively spelling the end of the G system.

== Design ==
The two G-series cameras have titanium-clad bodies and use the Contax G-mount, an electromechanical autofocus mount. When tested in 1995, the Contax G1 cost US$2,210 (equivalent to $4,700 in 2025) with the 45 mm Planar lens; the 28 mm Biogon and 90 mm Sonnar lenses were each US$660 (equivalent to $1,390 in 2025), and the list price for the 16 mm Hologon was US$3,000 (equivalent to $6,300 in 2025). The 45 mm Planar was listed separately at US$420 (equivalent to $890 in 2025). The Contax G2 listed for US$2,250 (equivalent to $4,300 in 2025) with the 45 mm Planar lens in 1999.

Critics were quick to accuse the G1 of not being a "true" (mechanical) rangefinder, since it used autofocus and electronically linked mechanisms. However, the AF mechanism in the G-series does indeed use a twin-window system much like that of the older mechanical rangefinders — only in electronic form. The viewfinder covers the field of view for lenses of focal lengths between 28 and 90 mm through an optical zoom, and automatically compensates for parallax error and field when focusing closer. The in-body finder shows 90% of the captured frame at 0.59× magnification when the "normal" 45 mm lens is used. The viewfinder uses molded aspherical lens elements to reduce size.

While there is an electronic connection between camera and lens to transmit data, the lenses have no AF motor and no means to adjust focus on the lens itself; both autofocus and manual focus are driven by a motor in the camera through a mechanical "screwdriver" coupling. The focus dial on the G1 is the dial marked with distances on the far right side of the body, and is also used to select the autofocus mode; on the G2, the focus dial was separated from the focus mode control and moved to the top front edge of the body.

=== Contax G2 ===
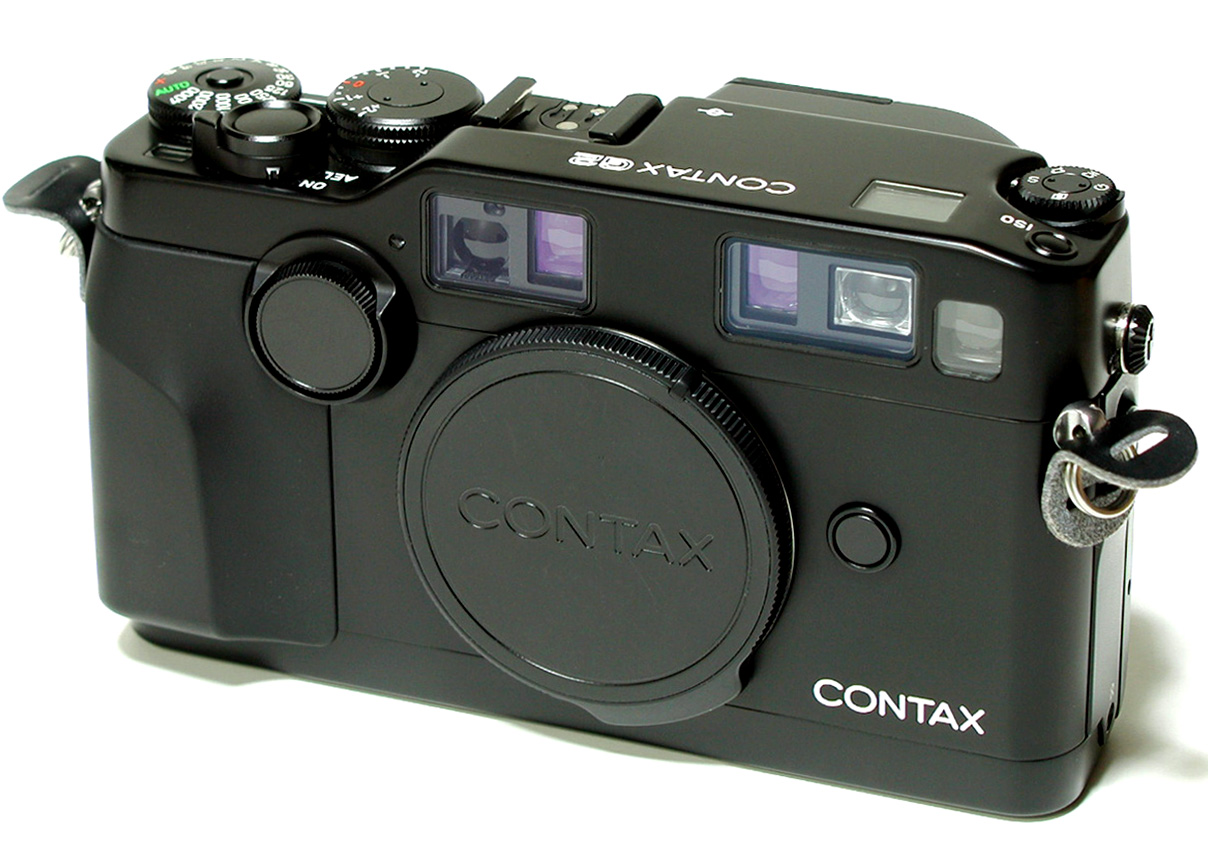
G2 in black finish

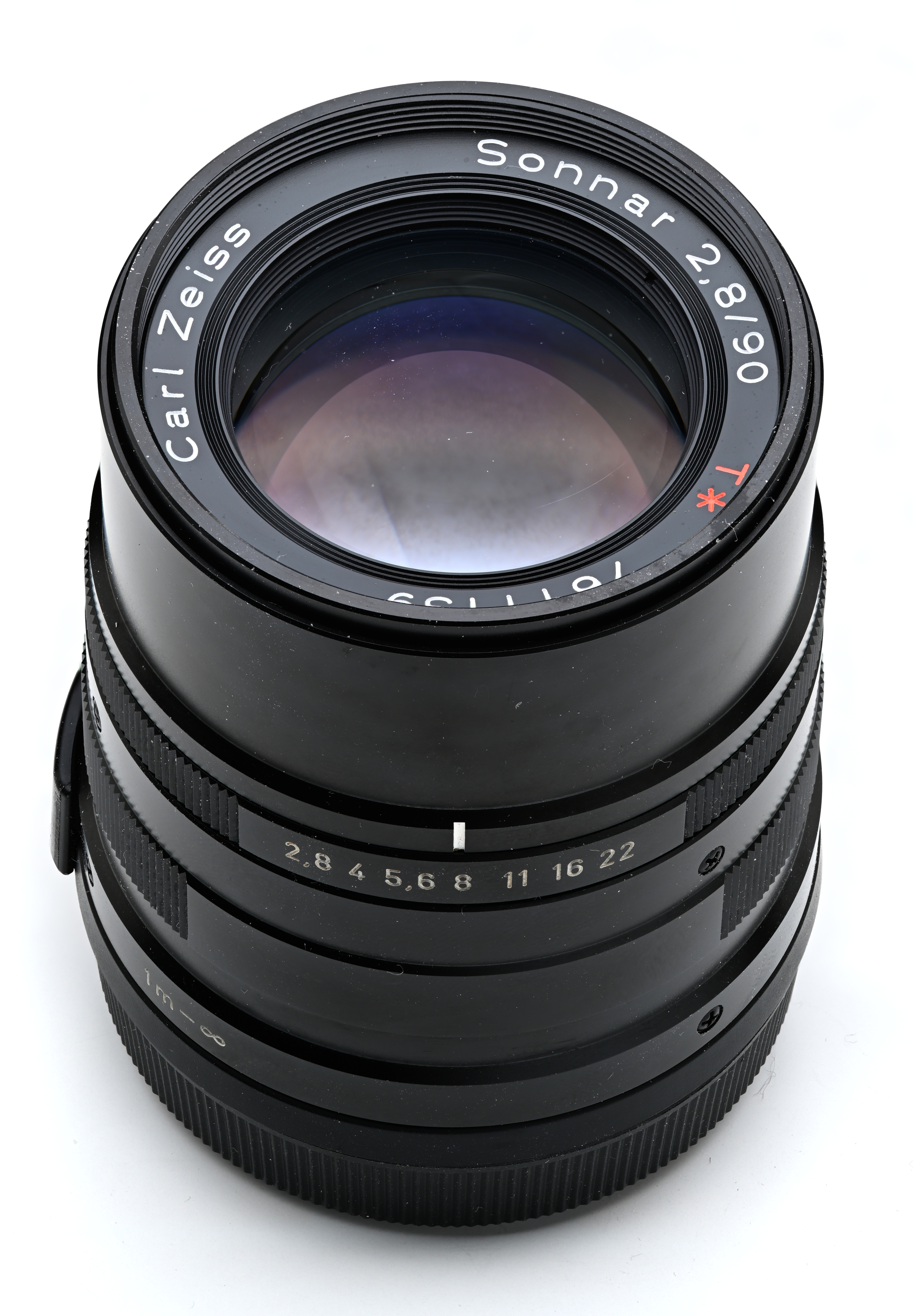
Matching Sonnar T* 2,8/90

Compared with the original G1, the G2 has improved autofocus performance and higher top shutter speeds of 1/4000 sec in manual mode and 1/6000 sec in aperture priority mode. The manual focus wheel was moved from the top deck to the front, to about the same position as where the focusing wheel was located on classic Dresden and Stuttgart Contax rangefinders. In addition, the G2 was made available in a black finish along with black versions of the TLA200 flash and 28 mm, 45 mm, and 90 mm lenses.

A new active auto-focus system has been added to the G2, which uses near-infrared beams to set the range. The G2 auto-focus also has two focusing modes: continuous, which constantly adjusts focus as the camera is moved; and single, which is a safety mode, focussing as the focus button is pressed (or shutter release half-pressed), and maintaining this reading until the shutter is released. If the camera fails to find focus in this mode, the shutter cannot be released.

Comparison of selected parameters, Contax G1 and G2
Parameter		Contax G1	Contax G2
Shutter speeds	AE	16–1/2000 sec	16–1/6000 sec
Shutter speeds	Manual	1–1/2000 sec, B, X	4–1/4000 sec, B, X
Shutter speeds	Sync	1/100	1/200
Metering	Internal	SPD off shutter curtain EV 1–19 at ISO 100	
Metering	External	EV 5-19 at ISO 100 (for Hologon)	EV 3-19 at ISO 100 (for Hologon)
Exposure modes		Aperture priority, Manual, TTL flash, Manual flash	
Dimensions (W×H×D)		133 mm × 76.5 mm × 35 mm 5.24 in × 3.01 in × 1.38 in	139 mm × 80 mm × 45 mm 5.5 in × 3.1 in × 1.8 in
Weight		450 g (16 oz)	560 g (20 oz)
References			

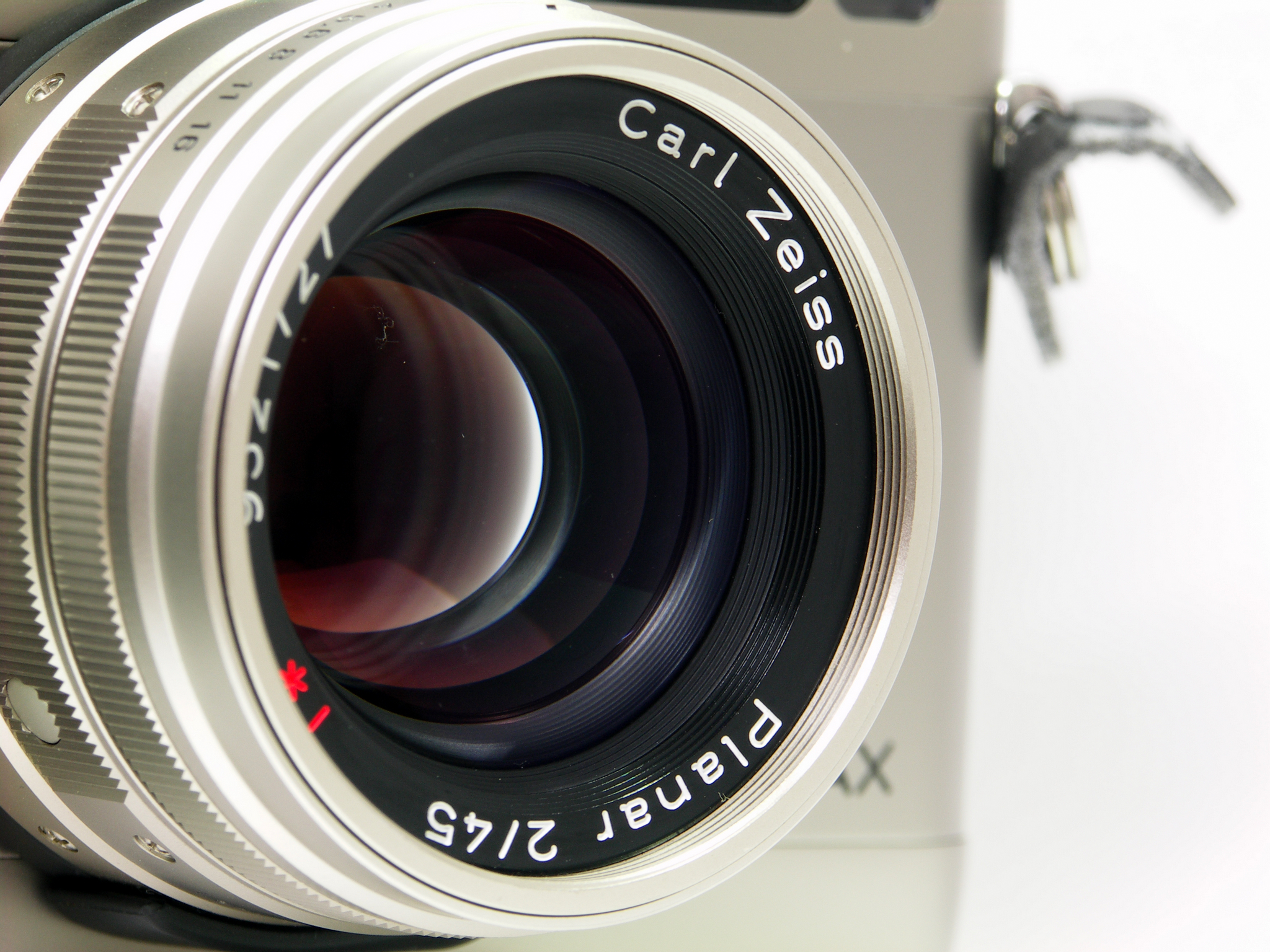
Planar T* 2/45mm

== Lenses ==
The lenses designed by Carl Zeiss for the G-series quickly established it as a camera of worth: the original trio of lenses released with the G1 included the 45 mm f/2 Planar, 28 mm f/2.8 Biogon, and 90 mm f/2.8 Sonnar; the 16 mm f/8 Hologon was announced at the system launch but was not immediately available. The G2 was released in 1996 alongside the 21 mm f/2.8 Biogon and 35 mm f/2 Planar. The 35–70 mm f/3.5–5.6 Vario-Sonnar, the first zoom lens for a rangefinder camera, was the last lens to be released, in 2000. All lenses were autofocus with the exception of the Hologon 8/16mm.

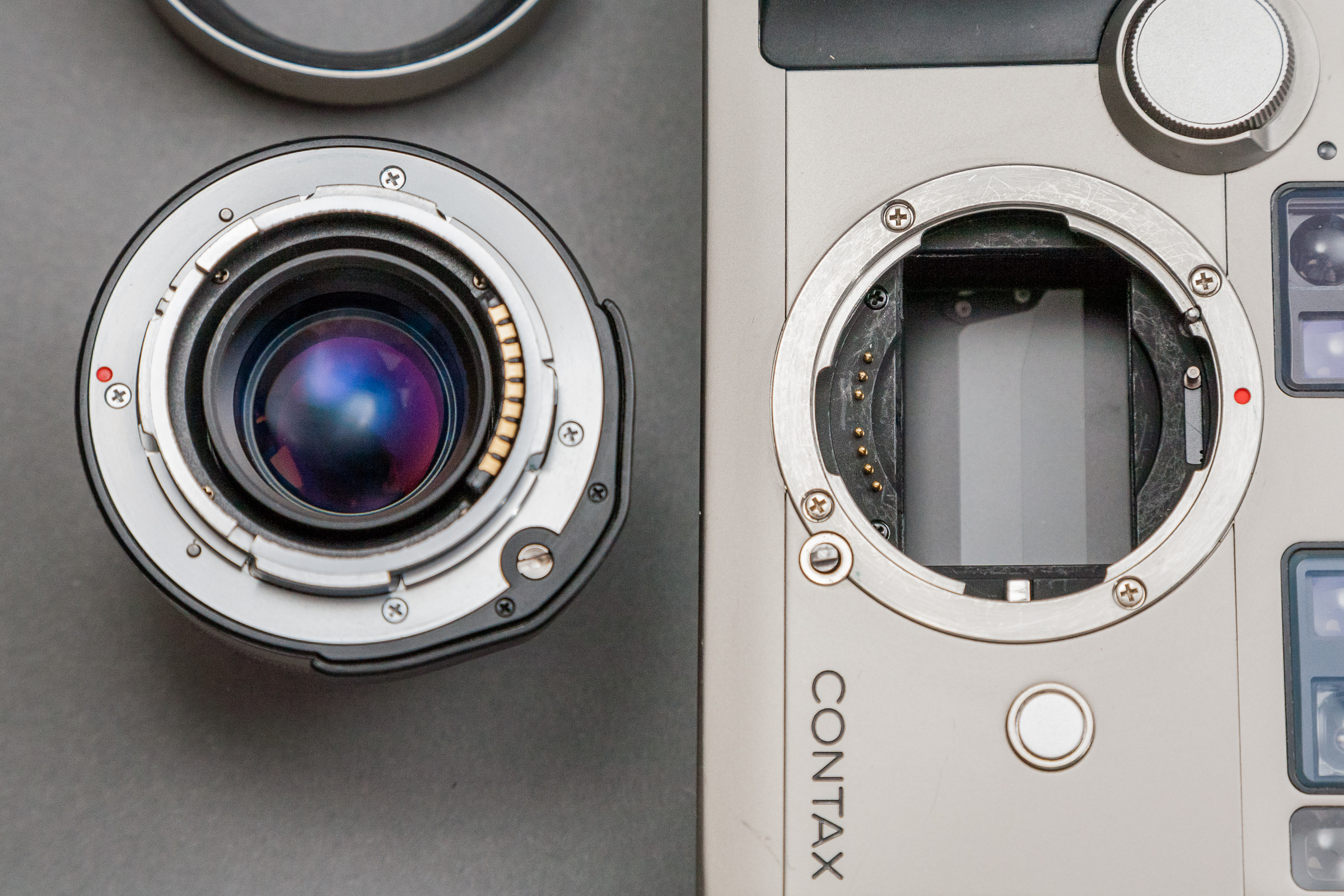
Contax G series lens mount

The flange distance between the front surface of the lens mount and the film plane is only 29 millimetres (1.1 in), and Contax released the GA-1 adaptor which allowed the use of Contax/Yashica mount lenses. Unlike most bayonet-mount lenses, the Contax G mount uses a breech-lock mechanism similar to the manual-focus Canon FD and FL mount.

The high optical quality of the G-series lenses makes them candidates for use with high-resolution digital sensors. Adapters are available for the Sony E-mount and Micro Four Thirds digital camera.

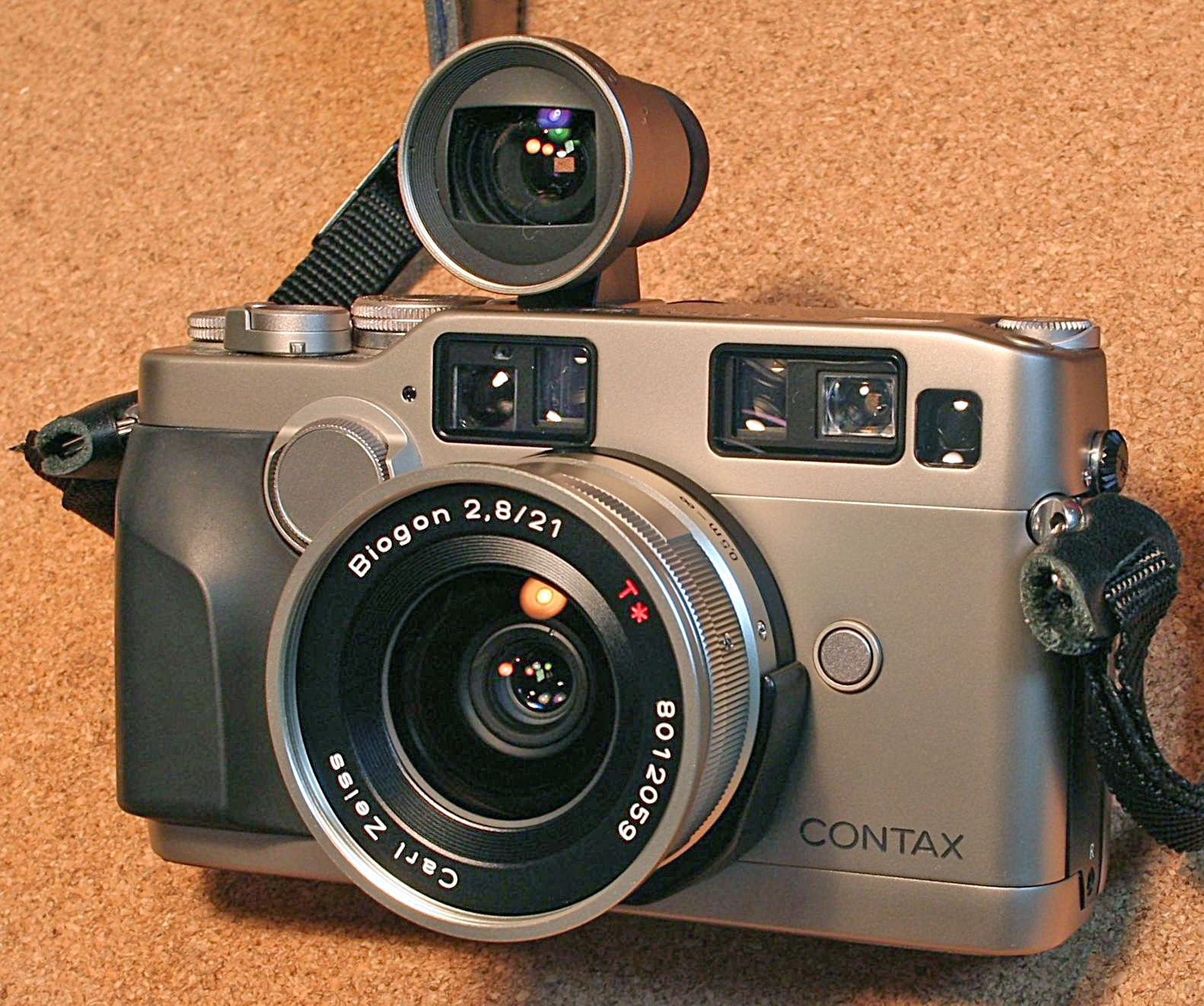
Contax G2 with Biogon T* 2.8/21mm and accessory viewfinder

Early versions of the G1 could only accept the four original lenses (16 mm, 28 mm, 45 mm, and 90 mm). A modified ROM was required to use autofocus with the 21 mm and 35 mm lenses; modified G1 cameras are marked with a green sticker inside the film door, and are known as "green label" G1s to distinguish them from unmodified "silver label" G1s. No G1 could accept the 35–70 mm, as it was a seven contact electrical connection and the G1 only features five contacts.

Because the viewfinder was limited to the angle of view corresponding to the 28 mm Biogon, the 16 mm Hologon and 21 mm Biogon lenses were each bundled with a separate accessory viewfinder that mounted in the hotshoe.

Contax G lenses
Name		Focal length	Aperture	Angle of view			Catalog	Rel.	Design		Min focus	Filter	Hood	Size		Weight	Refs.
Name		Focal length	Aperture	H (Note: Horizontal field of view, i.e., along the 36 mm side of the frame)	V (Note: Vertical field of view, i.e., along the 24 mm side of the frame)	D (Note: Diagonal field of view, i.e., along the diagonal of the film frame)	Catalog	Rel.	E (Note: Number of lens elements)	G (Note: Number of cemented groups)	Min focus	Filter	Hood	Φ (Note: Maximum diameter)	L (Note: Length, measured as projection from mount.)	Weight	Refs.
Hologon (Note: Requires external viewfinder.) (Note: Supplied with radially-graduated neutral density filter to ensure even exposure across the frame.)		16 mm (Note: Zeiss states the focal length of this lens is 16.5 mm.)	f/8 (fixed)	95°	72°	106°	10 49 27	1994	5	3	0.3 m (0.98 ft)	—	—	53 mm (2.1 in)	11 mm (0.43 in)	120 g (4.2 oz)	
Biogon		21 mm (Note: Zeiss states the focal length of this lens is 21.5 mm.)	f/2.8−22	80°	59°	90°	10 49 37	1996	9	7	0.5 m (1.6 ft)	55mm	—	59 mm (2.3 in)	35 mm (1.4 in)	200 g (7.1 oz)	
Biogon		28 mm (Note: Zeiss states the focal length of this lens is 28.5 mm.)	f/2.8−22	65°	46°	74°	10 49 29	1994	7	5	0.5 m (1.6 ft)	46mm	GG-1	56 mm (2.2 in)	31 mm (1.2 in)	150 g (5.3 oz)	
Planar		35 mm (Note: Zeiss states the focal length of this lens is 35.1 mm.)	f/2.0−16	55°	38°	64°	10 22 14	1996	7	5	0.5 m (1.6 ft)	46mm	GG-1	56 mm (2.2 in)	29 mm (1.1 in)	160 g (5.6 oz)	
Planar		45 mm (Note: Zeiss states the focal length of this lens is 46.9 mm.)	f/2.0−16	42°	29°	50°	10 22 09	1994	6	4	0.5 m (1.6 ft)	46mm	GG-2	56 mm (2.2 in)	39 mm (1.5 in)	190 g (6.7 oz)	
Sonnar		90 mm	f/2.8−22	23°	15°	27°	10 11 31	1994	5	4	1.0 m (3.3 ft)	46mm	GG-3	56 mm (2.2 in)	63 mm (2.5 in)	240 g (8.5 oz)	
Vario-Sonnar	W	35−70 mm (Note: Zeiss states the focal length range is between 36.5 mm and 68.2 mm.)	f/3.5−22	53°	36°	62°	10 47 65	2000	13	8	1.0 m (3.3 ft)	46mm	GG-1	59 mm (2.3 in)	54 mm (2.1 in)	290 g (10 oz)	
Vario-Sonnar	T	35−70 mm	f/5.6−22	29°	20°	35°	10 47 65	2000	13	8	1.0 m (3.3 ft)	46mm	GG-1	59 mm (2.3 in)	54 mm (2.1 in)	290 g (10 oz)	

== Accessories ==
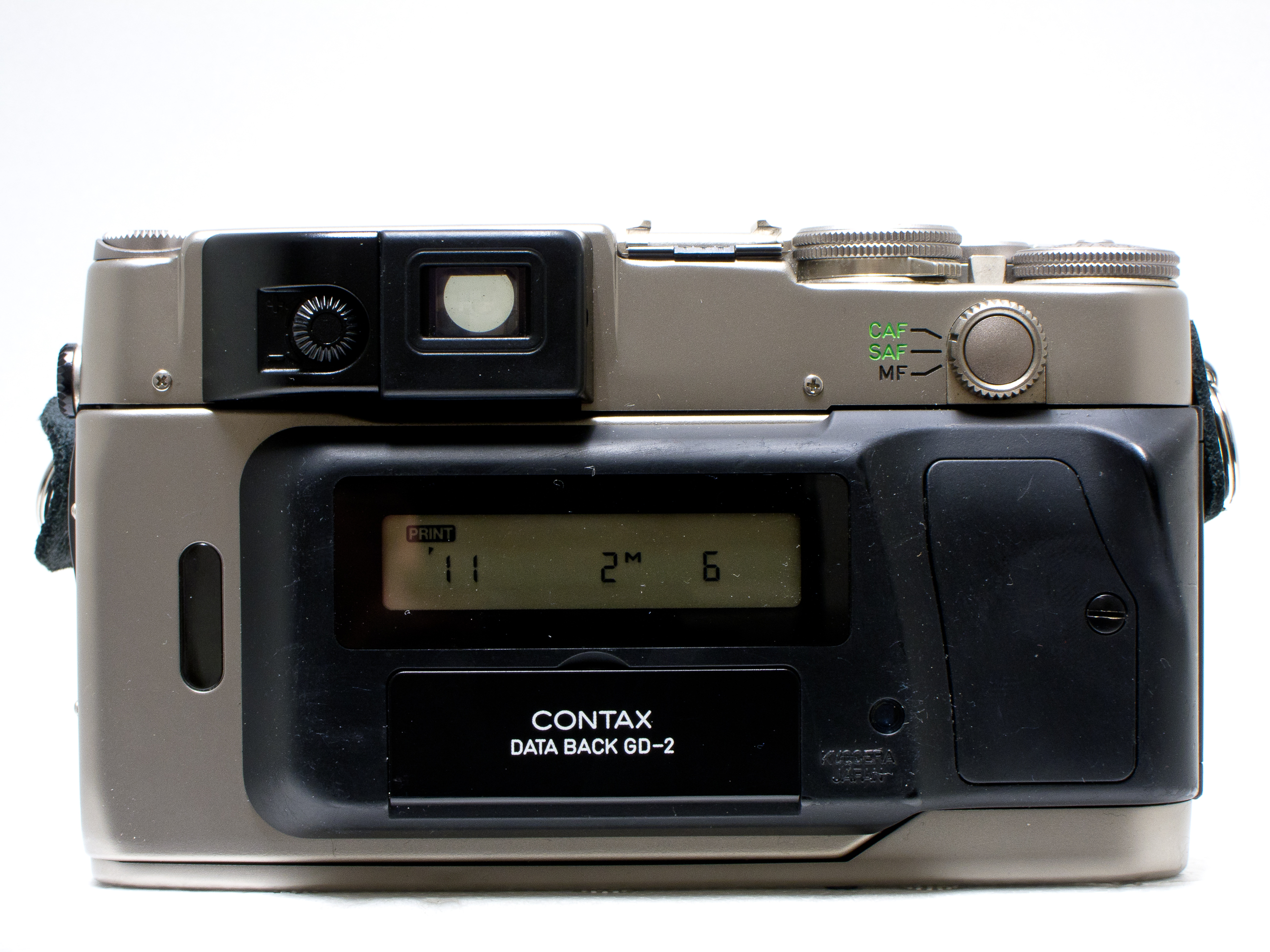
Contax G2 with GD-2 data back

Contax marketed a line of accessories dedicated for the G series of cameras and lenses.

Backs

- GD-1 - For the G1. Limited to date and time imprinting in frame.
- GD-2 - For the G2. Information (date, time, exposure) imprinted between frames, or collected and printed on first two frames. Exposure information includes compensation, shutter speed, approximate aperture, and exposure mode. Also provides intervalometer functions.

Caps

- GK-41 - Front lens cap, Φ=46mm
- GK-51 - Front lens cap, Φ=55mm for 2.8/21
- GK-54 - Front hood cap, Φ=57mm to push on the front of a mounted hood
- GK-B - Body cap
- GK-R1 - Rear lens cap
- GK-R2 - Rear lens cap, deep for 2.8/28, 2.8/21, 8/16

Cases

- GC-11 - For the G1.
  - GC-112 - Front/top portion of G1 case with 2.8/90 Sonnar.
- GC-21 - For the G2.
  - GC-22 - For the G2 with GD-2 data back.
  - GC-210 - Front/top portion of G2 case with 2/45 Planar or shorter.
  - GC-212 - Front/top portion of G2 case with 2.8/90 Sonnar.

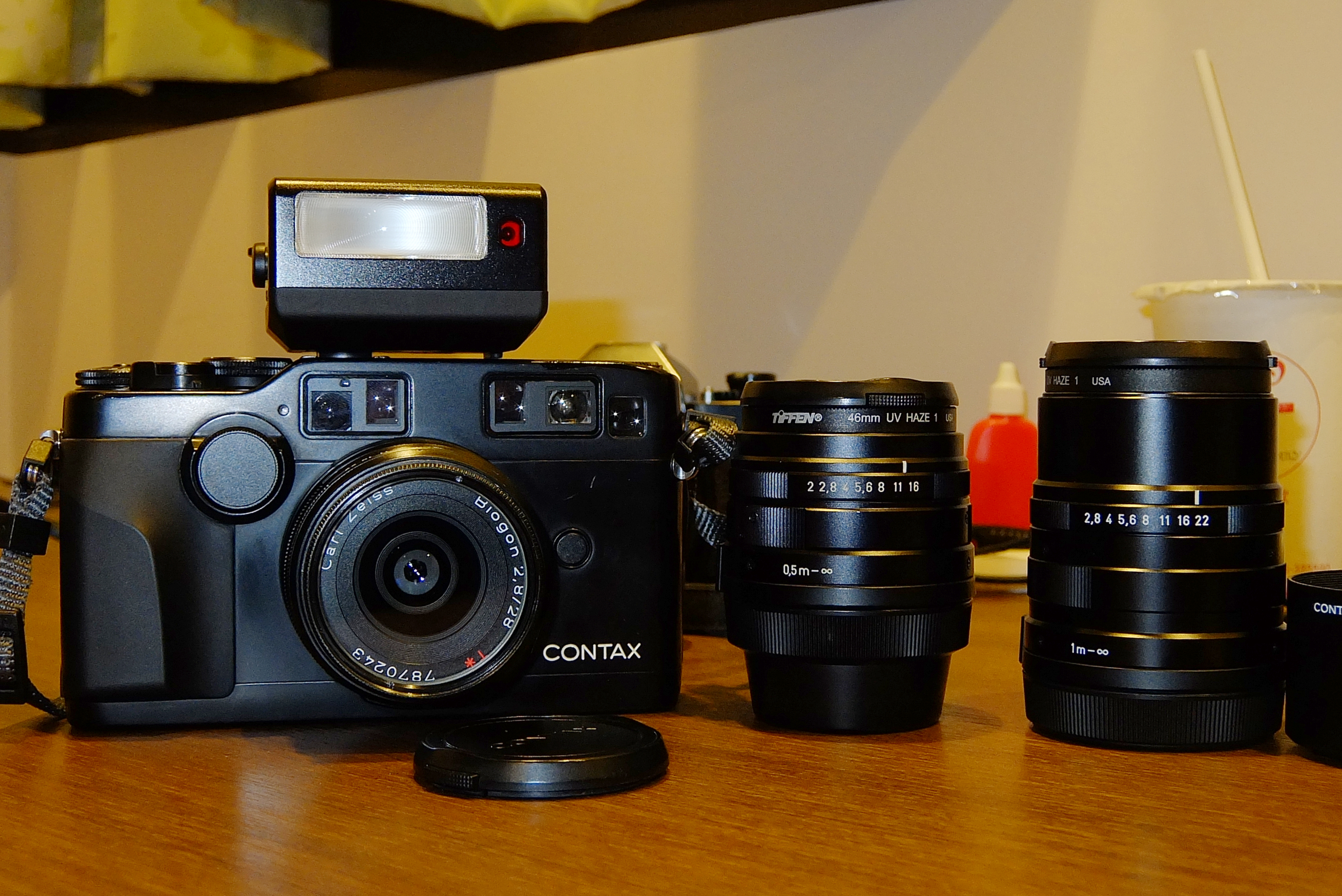
G2 in black with matching TLA 200 and lens set

Filters

Available in both 46mm and 55mm sizes.

- P - Protective filter
- UV - UV filter (L37)
- 1A - Skylight
- A2 - Warming (81A)
- B2 - Cooling (82B)

Flash

- TLA 140 - Introduced with G1.
- TLA 200 - Introduced with G2. Zoom reflector marked at 28mm, 35mm, 45mm, and 90mm coverage settings.

Comparison of TLA 140 and TLA 200 flash units
Name	Guide number	Battery	Recycle time	Endurance	Dimensions (W×H×D)	Weight
TLA 140	14m (ISO 100)	1×CR123A	4.8 sec	approx. 200	57 mm × 74 mm × 20.5 mm (2.24 in × 2.91 in × 0.81 in)	80 g (2.8 oz) (without battery)
TLA 200	20m (ISO 100) at 35mm zoom setting	2×CR2	3.5 sec	approx. 200	61 mm × 51 mm × 47 mm (2.4 in × 2.0 in × 1.9 in)	90 g (3.2 oz) (without batteries)

Hoods

- GG-1 - For the 2.8/28 Biogon, 2/35 Planar, and 3.5-5.6/35-70 Vario-Sonnar
- GG-2 - For the 2/45 Planar
- GG-3 - For the 2.8/90 Sonnar

Mount Adapter

- GA-1 - Allows the use of certain Contax/Yashica mount lenses (focal length of adapted lens is selectable on adapter: 28, 35, 50, 60, or 85mm). Rangefinder on body used to determine distance, then lens is focused manually.

Power

- GP-1 - Power pack adapter, fits in body and provides a terminal for the P-8 power pack
- P-8 - Power pack, external battery pack

Viewfinders

- GF-16mm - For the 8/16 Hologon
- GF-21mm - For the 2.8/21 Biogon

== Gallery ==
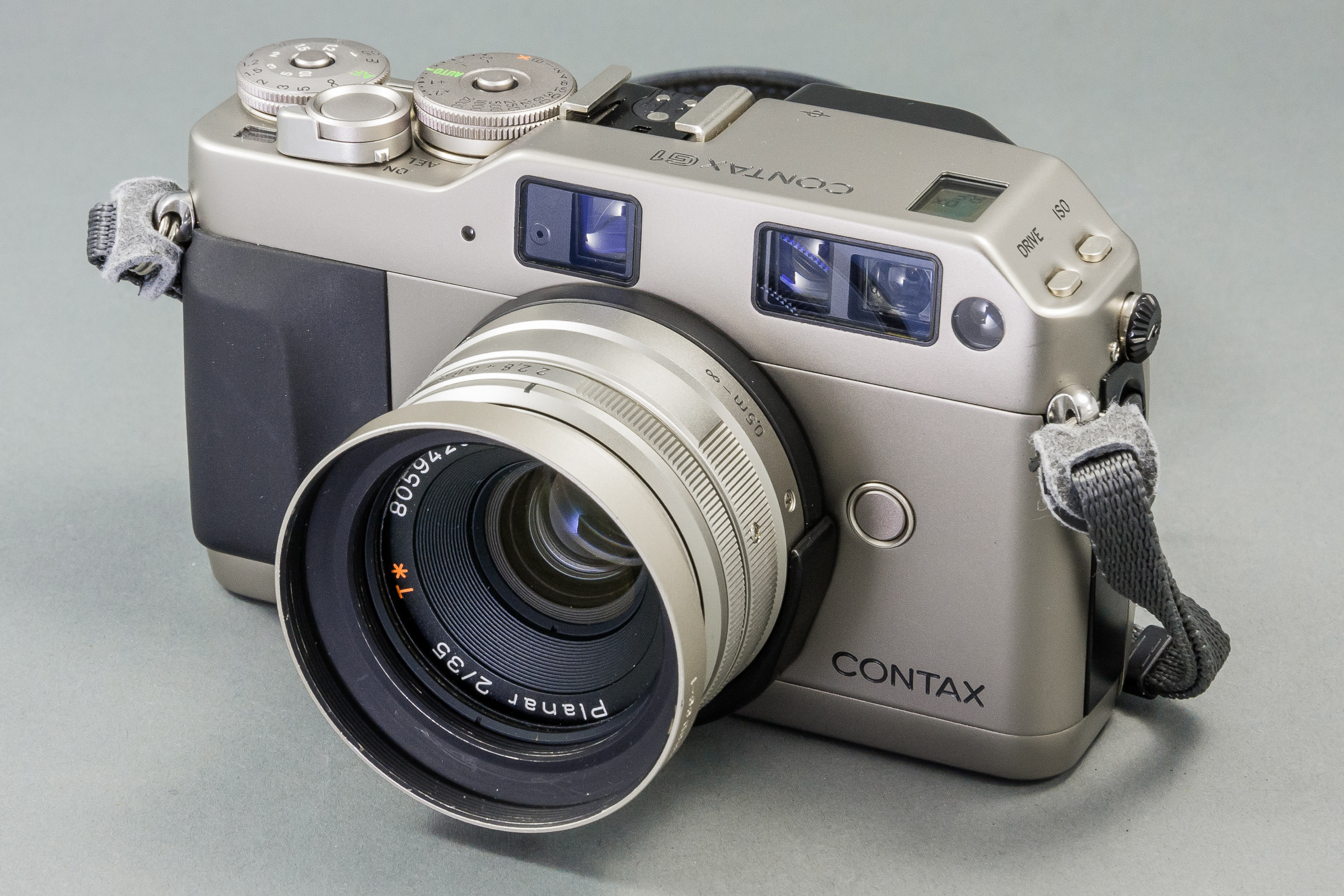
Contax G1 rangefinder

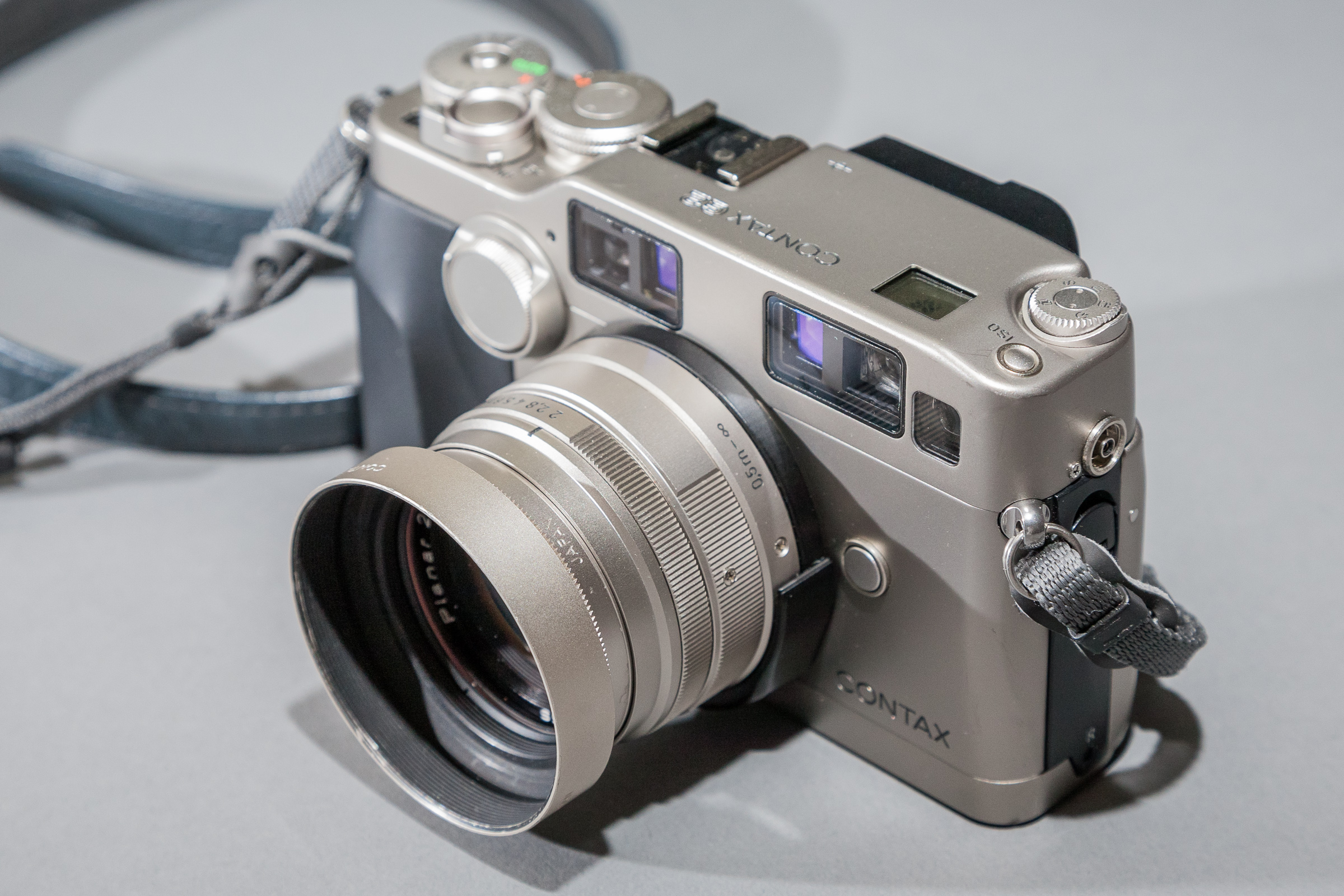
Contax G2 rangefinder

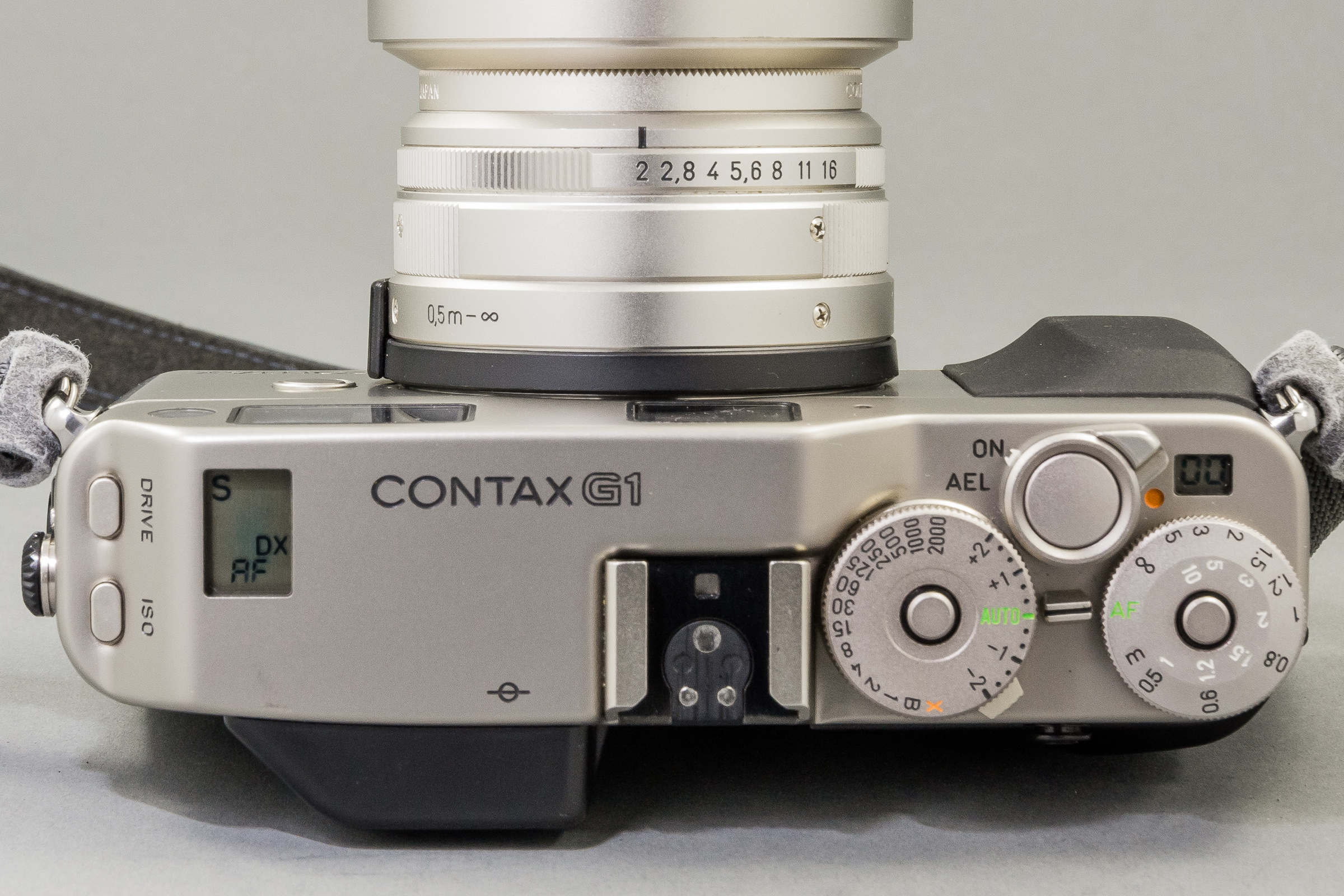
Contax G1 top

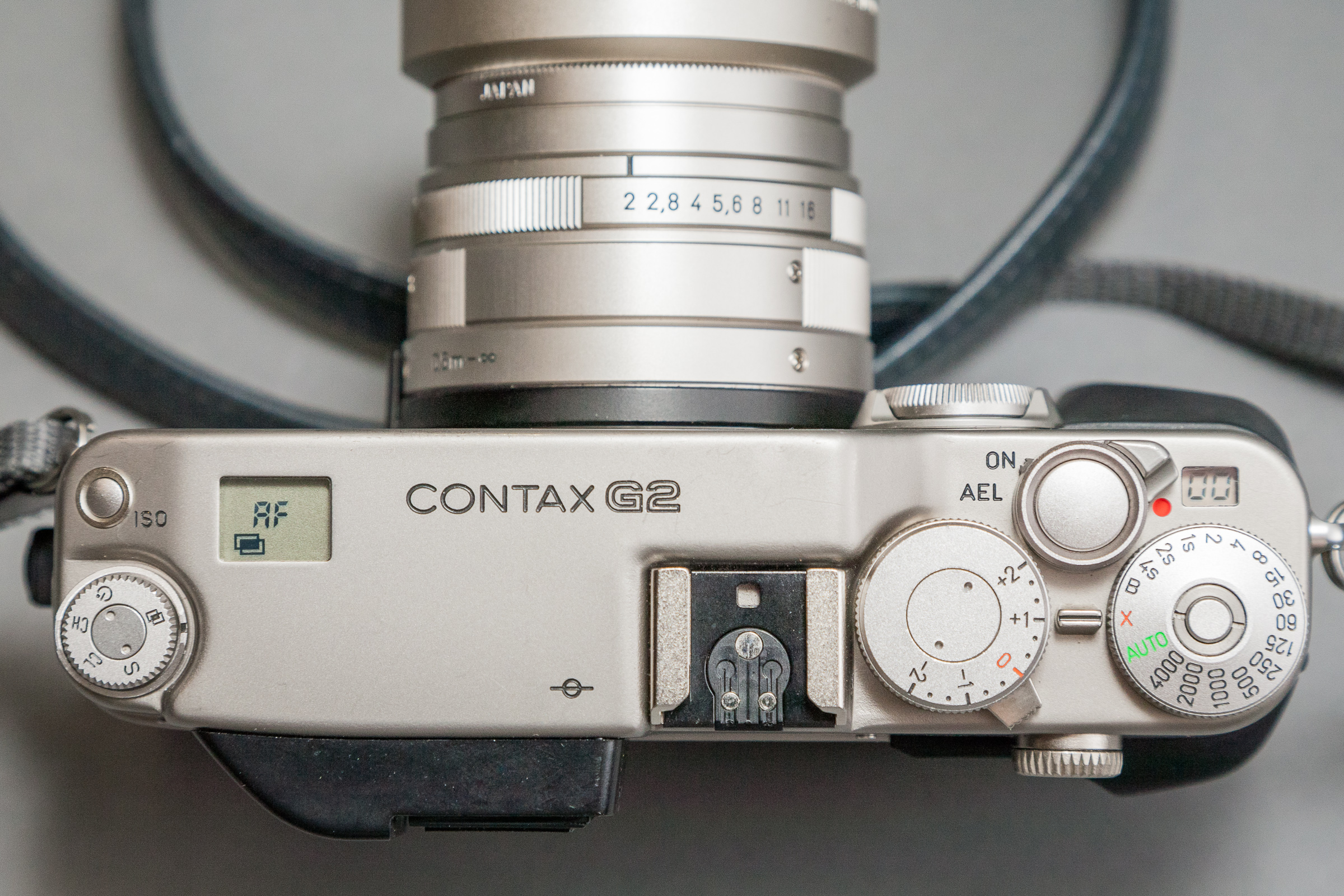
Contax G2 top
