= Pentacon Six mount =

Lens Mount

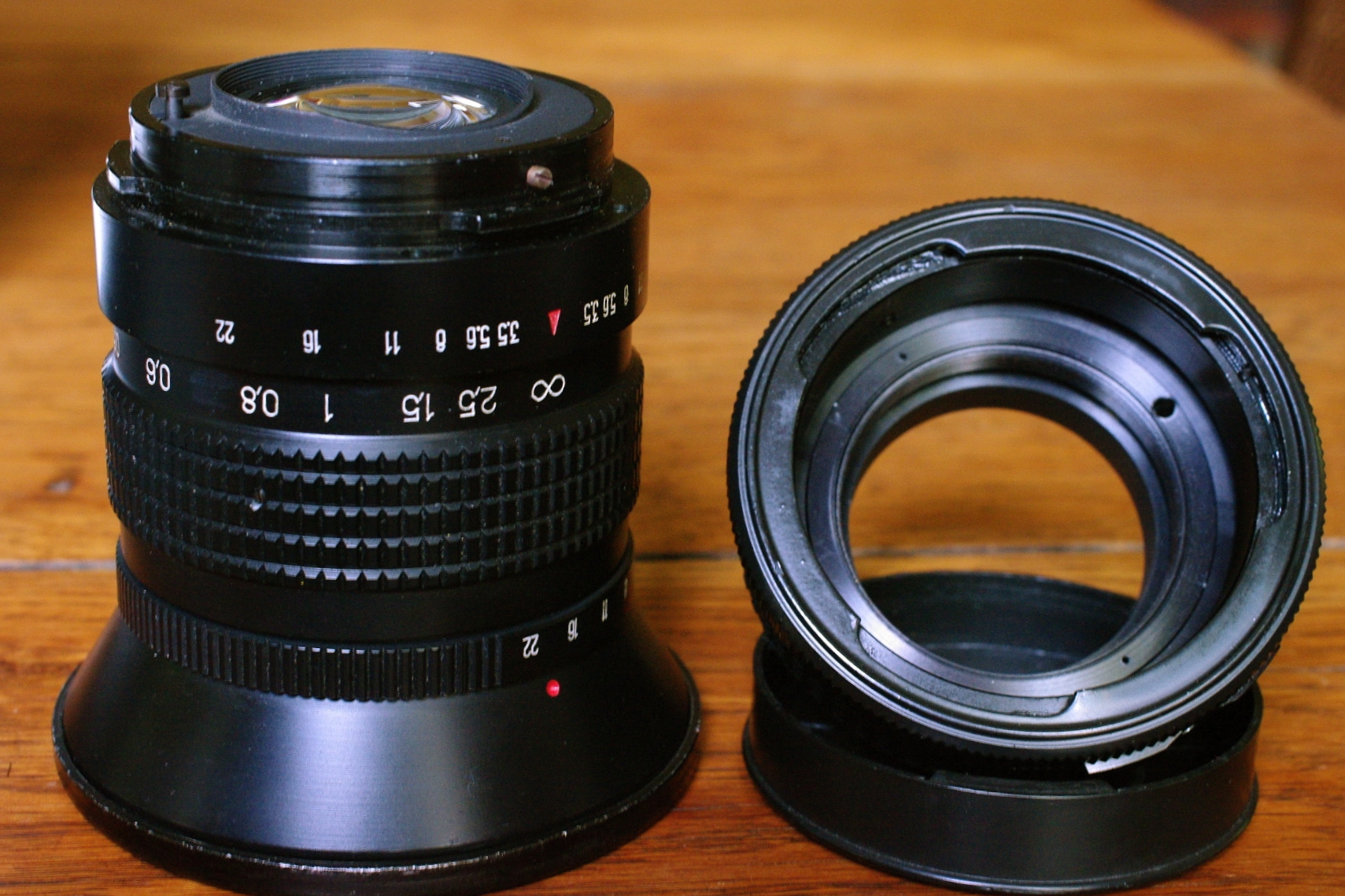
Pentacon six lens and lens adapter

The Pentacon Six mount (commonly abbreviated to P6, or Б in Cyrillic) is a breech-lock bayonet lens mount originally used by several medium format single-lens reflex cameras from East Germany.

The lens mount was originally designed by Carl Zeiss Jena and Kamera Werkstätten (KW) for the Praktisix camera. KW later merged with several other companies to become VEB Pentacon; the Praktisix was improved and renamed the Pentacon Six. This camera was manufactured for a much longer time (almost 40 years) and exported widely; hence the lens mount became associated most with the Pentacon Six name, rather than the original Praktisix.

== Variants ==
=== Original ===
The P6 mount is a simple bayonet mount. It has three short tabs on the lens; they are identical and correct orientation is assured by the placement of a post in front of the "top" tab. A pin holds the diaphragm open for fully open metering and focusing; this pin is released before the shutter is opened. The flange focal distance of mount is 74.1 mm.

The lens is inserted into the front of the camera and is held in place by a rotating collar.

This variant is seen on the Praktisix, Pentacon Six, Kiev 6C and Kiev 60.

=== Exakta 66 ===
The Exakta 66 added a TTL metered prism coupled to the shutter speed dial on the camera body and the aperture ring on the lens. It does this by projecting slightly over the front of the camera, allowing a rotating cam on the specially designed Schneider lenses to tell it what aperture setting was selected. And for lenses with a maximum aperture other than f/2.8, a separate pin projects from the lens to the prism to tell it the maximum aperture.

=== Kiev 88 modifications ===
The Kiev 88 is essentially a clone of the first Hasselblad - the 1600F/1000F. Like the Hasselblad, it has a threaded lens mount and Kiev-Arsenal manufactured its lens range in both the Pentacon Six mount (for the Kiev 60) and the Kiev 88 screw mount. However, there was interest in using Pentacon Six mount lenses from Carl Zeiss Jena and others on this camera (nicknamed the Hasselbladski). Thus various third parties worked to machine a P6-compatible lens mount into the Kiev 88. A major issue is the fact that the Kiev 88 has a greater flange focal distance than the Pentacon Six, requiring the lens to be recessed into the front of the modified Kiev 88. This causes physical clearance issues with some lenses, particularly the Exakta 66 lenses with a cam and possibly a pin for coupling the lens to a TTL prism.

A consequence of these early modifications is that the lens mount became twist-lock instead of breach-lock; the lens is inserted and turned.

=== Kiev 88СМ ===
The Kiev 88СМ is a later version of the Kiev 88 manufactured with a P6 mount from the factory. Like the earlier Kiev 88 modifications, the lens is recessed in the front of the camera body. However it returns to the breach-lock origins of the mount. It has an "internal collar" that is turned by a tab accessible from the front of the camera.

== Cameras ==
From KW/Pentacon:

- Praktisix
- Pentacon Six

From Exakta GmbH:

- Exakta 66

From Kiev-Arsenal:

- Kiev 6C
- Kiev 60
- Modified Kiev 88's
- Kiev 88С
- Kiev 88СМ
- ARAX
- Hartblei

Adaptors are also available. They allow the use of P6 lenses on Mamiya 645, Pentax 645 and Contax 645 medium format cameras, Canon EF, Canon FD, Nikon F, Minolta AF, Minolta MD, Contax/Yashica, Pentax K, M42, and Leica R 35 mm cameras, as well as Lumix and Olympus micro 4/3 (m4/3), 4/3 system. There are also tilt and shift adaptors for most of the 35 mm lens mounts, making use of the larger imaging circle to allow control over perspective or focus.

== Lenses ==
=== Pentacon ===
From East Germany, originally Meyer-Optik.

- 1:4.0 300 mm Orestegor
- 1:5.6 500 mm Orestegor
- 1:3.5 80mm Meyer Primotar-E

=== Carl Zeiss Jena ===
From East Germany.

- 1:4.0 50 mm Flektogon
- 1:2.8 65 mm Flektogon
- 1:2.8 80 mm Tessar
- 1:2.8 80 mm Biometar (kit lens)
- 1:2.8 120 mm Biometar
- 1:2.8 180 mm Sonnar
- 1:4.0 300 mm Sonnar
- 1:8.0 500 mm Fernobjektiv
- 1:5.6 1000 mm (catadioptric)

=== Schneider Kreuznach ===
From West Germany, for the Exakta 66.

- 1:4.5 55 mm Super-Angulon MF
- 1:3.5 60 mm Curtagon MF
- 1:2.8 80 mm Xenotar MF
- 1:2.8 80 mm Biometar
- 1:2.8 80 mm Exakta
- 1:4.0 150 mm Tele-Xenar
- 1:5.6 250 mm Tele-Xenar MF
- 1:4.5 75–150 mm Variogon MF
- 1:5.6 140–280 mm Variogon MF
- 1:4.0 40 mm Curtagon MF is a legend and was never seen in the wild

=== Kiev/Arsat ===
From Ukraine.

- 1:3.5 30 mm Zodiak-8B (fisheye)
- 1:3.5 45 mm Mir-26B
- 1:3.5 45 mm Mir-69B (extremely rare)
- 1:4.5 55 mm Arsat shift
- 1:3.5 65 mm Mir-3B
- 1:3.5 65 mm Mir-38B
- 1:2.8 80 mm Volna-3
- 1:2.8 90 mm Vega-12
- 1:2.8 120 mm Vega-28B
- 1:2.8 150 mm Kaleinar-3B
- 1:3.5 250 mm Jupiter-36B
- 1:3.5 250 mm Telear-4B
- 1:5.6 250 mm Telear-5B
- 1:4.5 300 mm Tair-33
- 1:5.6 500 mm Arsat APO MC
- 1:8.0 600 mm 3M-3B (catadioptric)

=== Hartblei ===
From Ukraine.

- 1:3.5 45 mm shift
- 1:3.5 45 mm tilt/shift
- 1:3.5 45 mm Super-Rotator tilt/shift
- 1:3.5 65 mm shift
- 1:3.5 65 mm tilt/shift
- 1:3.5 65 mm Super-Rotator tilt/shift
- 1:2.8 150 mm tele

=== Arax ===
From Ukraine.

- 1:2.8 80 mm Arax
- 1:3.5 45 mm shift
- 1:3.5 65 mm shift

=== Kilfitt ===
From West Germany.

- 1:2.8 90 mm Macro-Kilar
- 1:3.5 150 mm Kilar
- 1:5.6 300 mm Tele-Kilar
- 1:4.0 300 mm Pan-Tele-Kilar
- 1:5.6 400 mm Fern-Kilar
- 1:4.0 400 mm Sport-Fern-Kilar
- 1:5.6 600 mm Sport-Fern-Kilar

=== Zoomar ===
From the United States.

- 1:5.6 500 mm Zoomar Reflectar (catadioptric)
- 1:8.0 1000 mm Zoomar Reflectar (catadioptric)
- 1:4.0 170–320 mm Zoomar

=== Novoflex ===
From West Germany.

- 1:5.6 240 mm Novoflexar
- 1:5.6 500 mm Tele Novoflexar

=== Astro ===
From West Germany.

- 1:2.0 150 mm Color-Astrar
- 1:2.3 150 mm Astro-Tachar
- 1:1.8 150 mm Astro-Tachar
- 1:3.5 200 mm Astro-Telestan
- 1:3.5 300 mm Astro-Telestan
- 1:4.5 500 mm Astro-Telestan
- 1:5.0 640 mm Astro-Fernbild
- 1:5.0 800 mm Astro-Fernbild
- 1:6.3 1000 mm Astro-Fernbild
- 1:10.0 2000 mm Astro-Telestan
