= Pentacon Six =

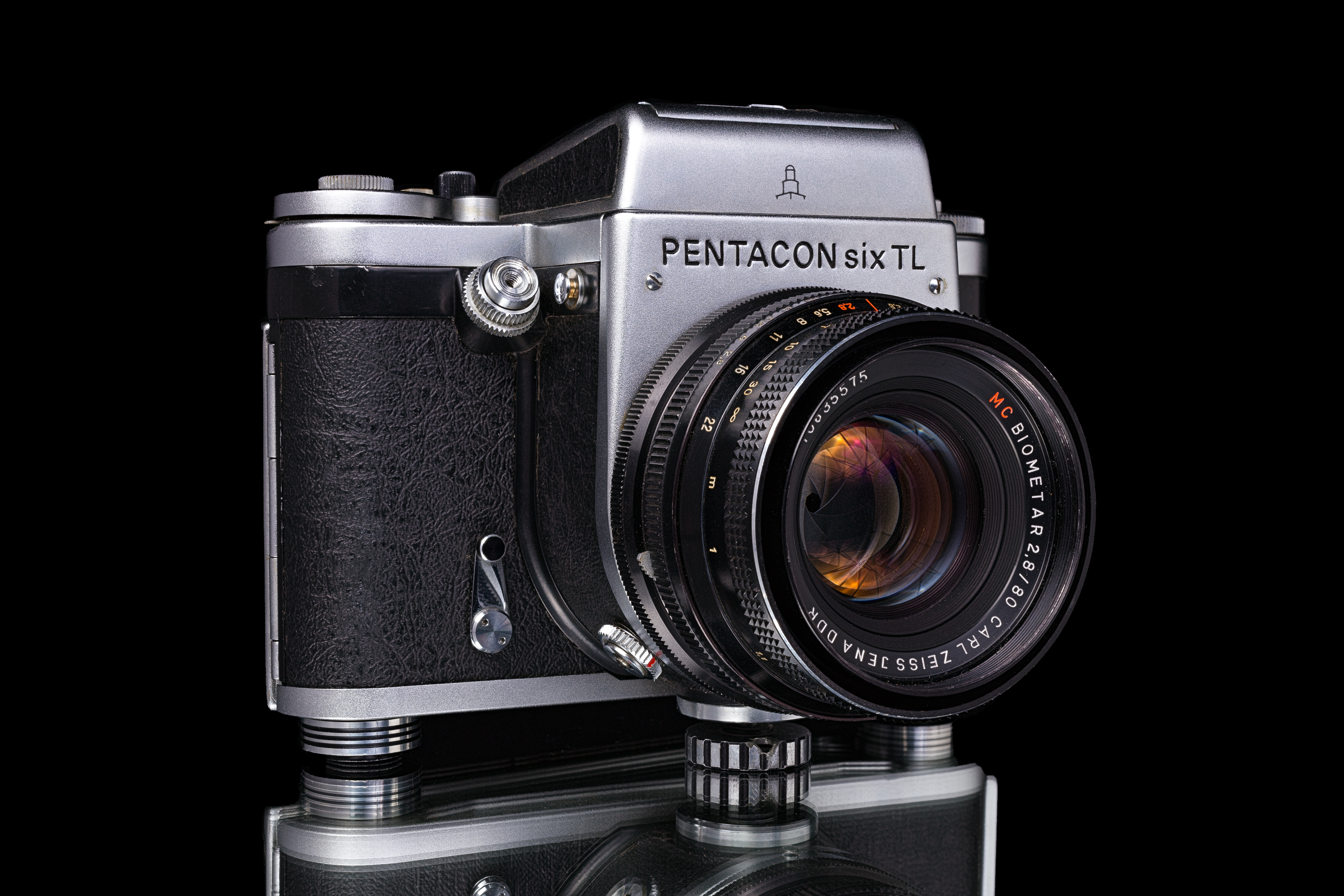
- Pentacon Six TL with the standard Carl Zeiss Jena Biometar f/2.8 80mm prime lens

Overview
- Maker: Pentacon
- Type: Single-lens reflex
- Released: 1966

Lens
- Lens mount: Pentacon Six mount
- Lens: Interchangeable lens

Sensor/medium
- Film format: Medium format 120/220 film
- Film size: 56 mm x 56 mm
- Film advance: Manual

Flash
- Flash: PC Sync
- Flash synchronization: 1/25 s

Viewfinder
- Viewfinder: Waist-level viewfinder (80% range), optional metering TTL and standard prisms

General
- Battery: 1.35 volt PX625, PX13 or equivalent (for metering TTL prism)
- Weight: 1.7 kg / 3.75 lb (Pentacon Six TL)
- Made in: East Germany

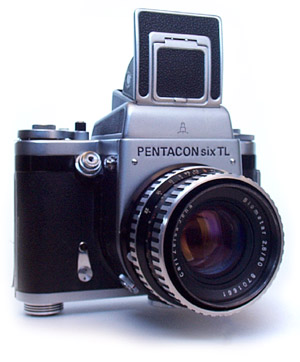
Pentacon six TL medium format camera

The Pentacon Six is a single-lens reflex (SLR) medium format camera system made by East German manufacturer Pentacon from 1966 to 1992. The Six accepts lenses with the Pentacon Six mount, a breech-lock bayonet mount.

== History ==
=== Praktisix ===
The Praktisix was manufactured by Kamera Werkstätten (KW). It is a 6×6 SLR modelled on contemporary 35 mm SLRs. It was followed by the Praktisix II and Praktisix IIA, all with minor, relatively cosmetic changes. They all have rather poor reliability, including poor frame spacing.

=== Pentacon Six ===
In 1959 Kamera Werkstätten became VEB Kamera and KinoWerke Dresden. In 1964 they became VEB Pentacon and in 1970, Kombinat VEB Pentacon. With the unification of the East German photographic industry the Praktisix was modified to become the Pentacon Six. Frame spacing was improved through the use of a roller with teeth that is turned by the film as it advances; when the correct length of film has advanced, the mechanism disengages.

When the TTL-metered prism was introduced, the letters 'TL' were added to the name plate but no other changes were made to the camera body.

The Pentacon Six was imported into the U.S. as the Hanimex Praktica 66 by Australian distributor Hanimex. This was to get around U.S. laws prohibiting direct imports from communist countries.

The Pentacon Six TLs is a version modified to shoot 4×4.5 cm frames for photo IDs.

=== Exakta 66 ===
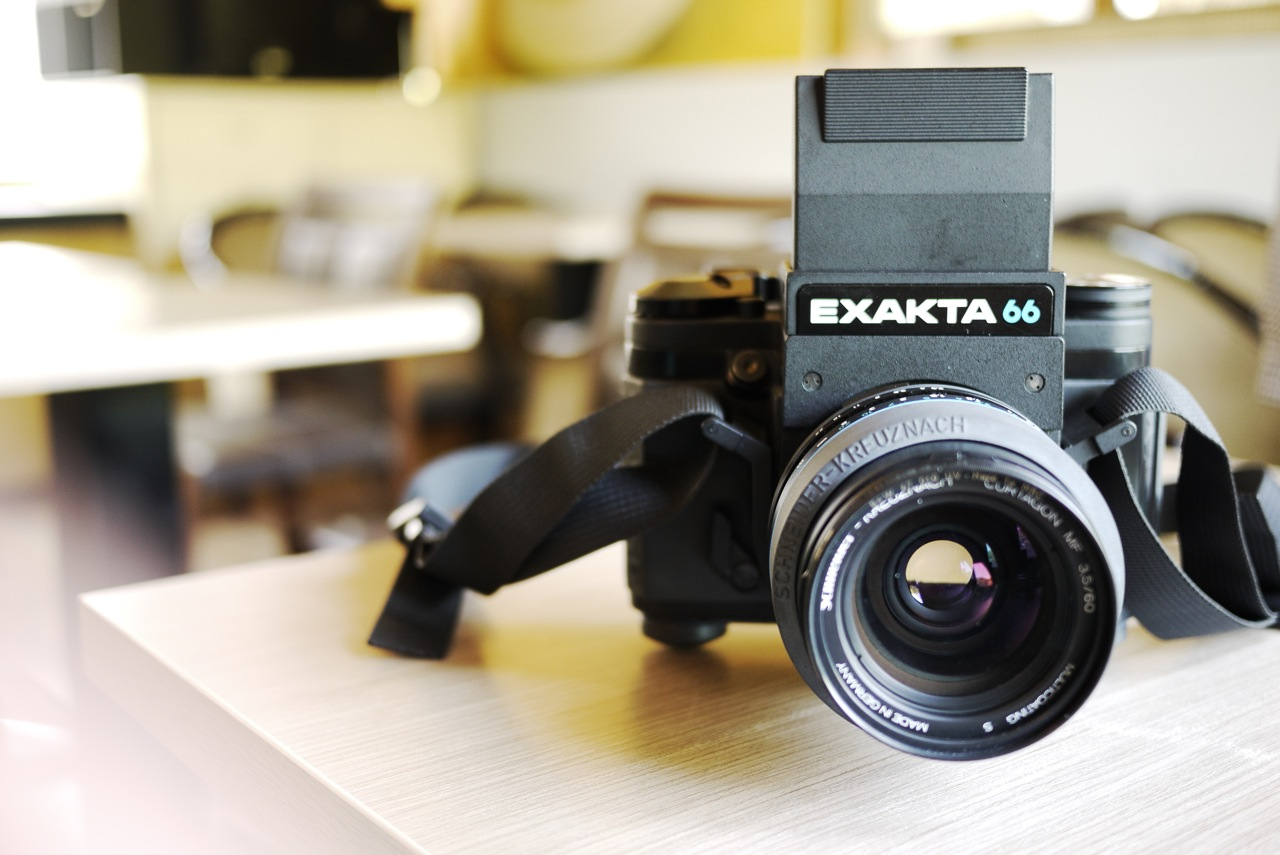
Exakta 66

The Exakta 66 is based on the Pentacon Six but was made in West Germany by Exakta GmbH, Nuremberg. The body is rubber coated, the film advance lever moves through a shorter angle, and it has a TTL-metered prism coupled to new Schneider lenses.

The Exakta 66 is not to be confused with several earlier cameras with nearly exactly the same name. These Exakta 6x6 cameras were produced by Ihagee, Dresden, in the pre-war years and with interruptions until 1954.

== Viewfinders ==
The Praktisix and Pentacon Six come with a simple waist-level finder with a flip-up cover. A non-metered prism was available for the Pentacon Six, with a TTL-metered prism produced later.

A third-party adaptor allows the metered prism from the Kiev 60 (which is based externally on the Pentacon Six) to be attached to most Pentacon Sixes and Exakta 66's. It is brighter, shows more of the view, and is available new. The same adaptor also allows the Kiev 60 waist-level finder to be used. This finder is reportedly inspired by the one found on Rolleiflex TLR cameras and is also better than the original Pentacon finder.
