= Kiev (brand) =

Soviet and Ukrainian brand of photocameras

Kiev is a Soviet and Ukrainian brand of photographic equipment including cameras manufactured by the Arsenal Factory in Kyiv, Ukraine. The camera nameplates show the name "KIEV", with older cameras using "КИЕВ" (in Russian) or "КИЇВ" (in Ukrainian) in Cyrillic.

In November 2009, it was announced that the Arsenal factory would be closing after 245 years of operation.

== Kiev 35mm rangefinders ==
Arsenal produced several 35mm film rangefinders, which were clones of the pre-WWII Contax II and Contax III cameras.

Kiev rangefinders retained the same lens mount as the pre-WWII Contax rangefinders, making the lenses interchangeable between both brands. The lens mount of both cameras was sophisticated compared with other cameras of the time. The so-called 'Contax/Kiev bayonet' actually consists of two bayonets – the inner bayonet, which is used exclusively for 50mm lenses, and the outer bayonet, which is used for all the other lenses. This makes adapting Kiev lenses which use internal bayonet to modern mirrorless cameras complicated compared to those that use the external bayonet. The internal bayonet lenses do not have a focus ring, because the bayonet is actually the helix. Adapters for such lenses tend to be more expensive than simple external bayonet adapters.

The number of Kiev rangefinders vastly exceeded that of the pre-war Dresden and post-war Jena and Stuttgart Contaxes.

=== Kiev ===
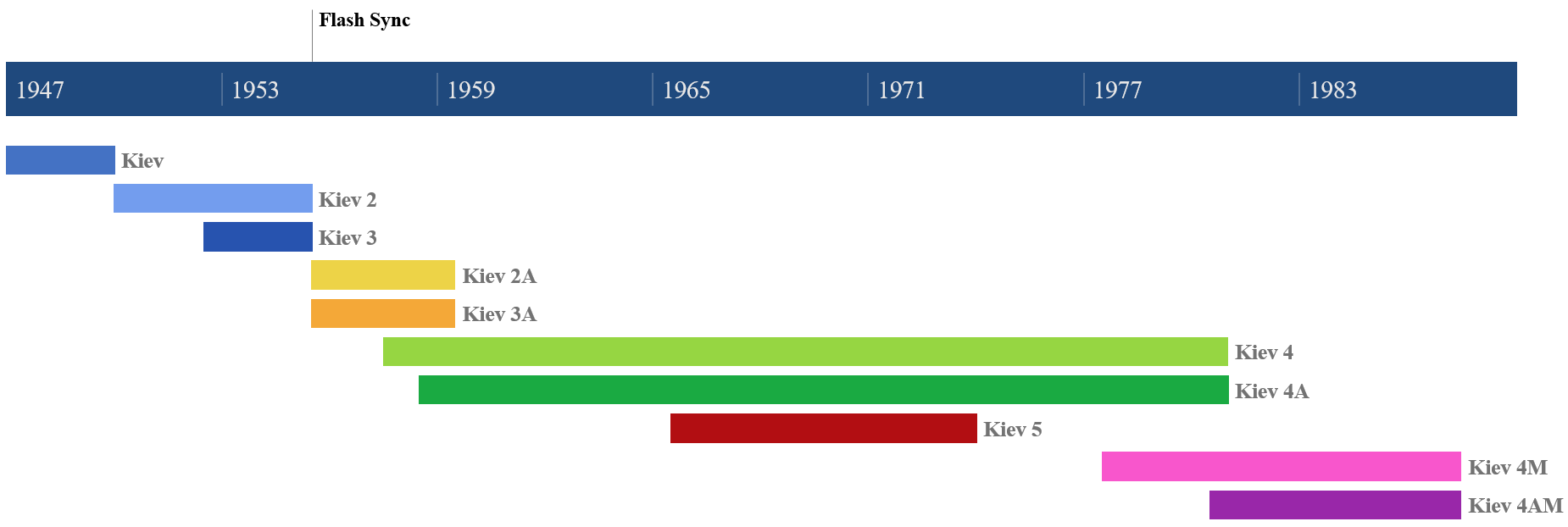
Production timelines of Kiev 35mm rangefinders.

After the Second World War had ended, the Soviet Union demanded new sets of Contax tools from the original toolmaker in Dresden and then ordered a fair number of trial cameras to be made with Zeiss trademarks and coated lenses from these 1946 in post-war East Germany. With this successful, everything together with German instructors were transferred to Kyiv. Missing specialists were in a few cases recruited in West Germany. Any still available parts went in the same direction. In fact, removing the front of some very early Kiev cameras, one could see that the metal was originally stamped with the Contax name, then pressed out and re-stamped as Kiev. By the early 1950 all the parts for Kiev cameras were produced in Ukraine.

The Kiev camera, like Zeiss Ikon Contax, is a full frame 35mm rangefinder camera with a long rangefinder base and combined rangefinder-viewfinder. It has a metal "window blind" shutter, which runs vertically. Shutter speeds range from 1/2s to 1/1250s + B.

The four digit serial numbers (first two digits represent the production year, and four additional digits represent the actual serial number) and research suggest production of fewer than 5,000 cameras annually.

=== Kiev 2 / Kiev 2A ===
The Kiev 2 was very similar to the original Kiev. The most noticeable change was a new logo. There were also some minor cosmetic changes, such as design of the balance foot. Production was increased to 15,000 cameras annually, requiring five digit serial numbers.

There were two types of Kiev 2 camera, one of them being the Kiev 2, and the other being the Kiev 2A, which was essentially the same camera, but with the flash sync. The flash sync connector is located underneath the viewfinder window.

=== Kiev 3 / Kiev 3A ===
The Kiev 3 was a copy of the Contax III officially introduced in 1952, though earlier models were built from 1948 on, based on German Contax parts. It was built until 1955, after which it was replaced by the Kiev 3A, essentially the same camera with flash synchronization. It was very similar to the Kiev 2, but it included an uncoupled selenium light meter. It likely had top plates and meter cells from Zeiss Ikon in the earliest models. The meter settings are located in the rewind knob crown.

=== Kiev 4 / Kiev 4A ===
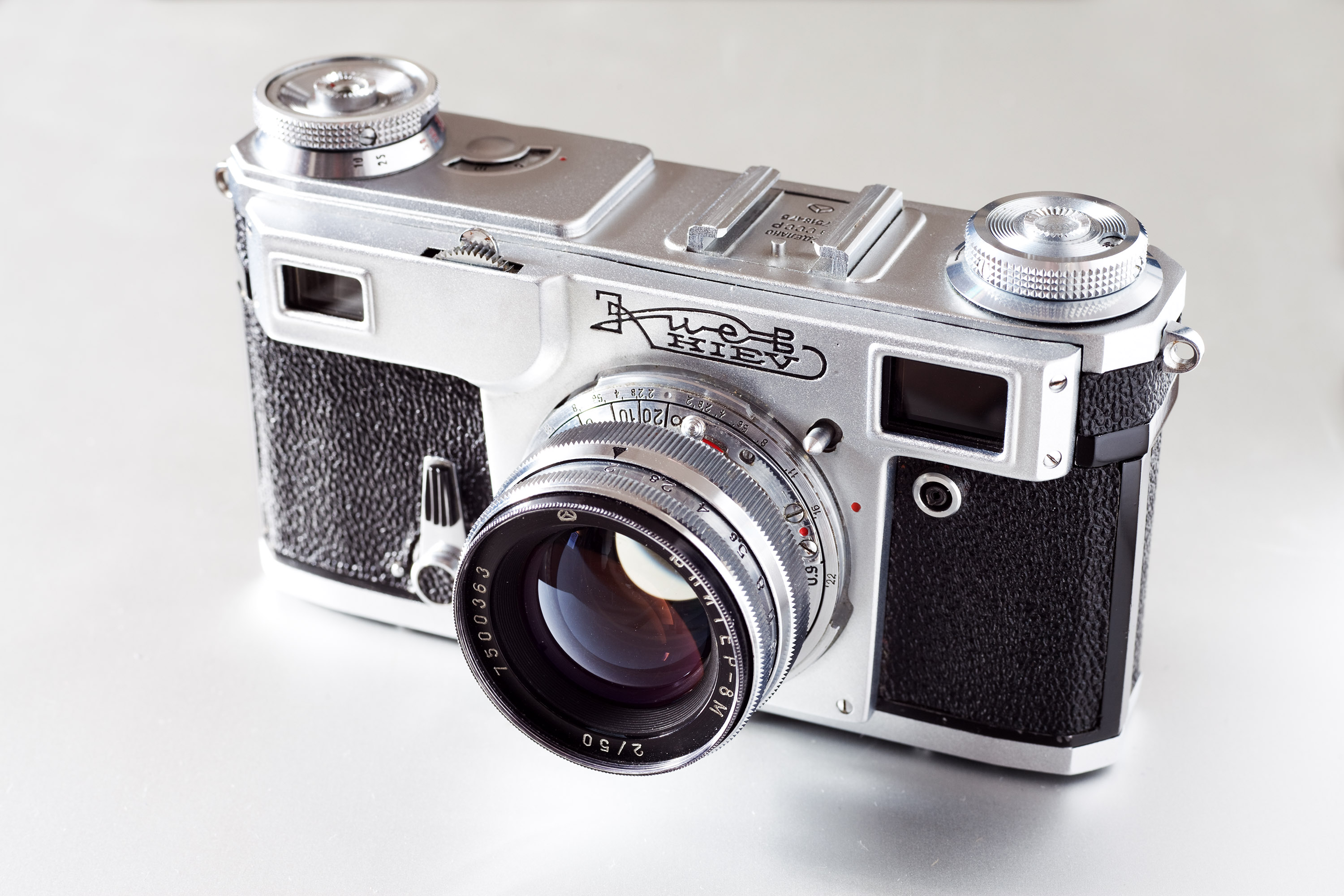
Kiev 4A

The Kiev 4 and 4A are the most common of Kiev rangefinders. They had some minor visual modifications to be visually closer to Contax III.

The Kiev 4A was an updated model of the Kiev 2A. The camera bottom is now flat, missing the support foot. The rewind knob now includes the film speed reminder. There was also a new back/base plate. On the other hand, the Kiev 4 replaced the Kiev 3A. It included all the modifications made to the Kiev 4A, but also added a new, smaller and more sensitive light meter.

=== Kiev 4M / Kiev 4AM ===
The Kiev 4M was a modernized version of the Kiev 4. The Kiev4M is usually considered less desirable than the Kiev 4 because of their poor quality control. There are two versions: the Kiev 4M and the Kiev 4AM, which is the same camera, but without the light meter.

The shutter speeds are marked from 1/2s to 1/1000s + B. The camera inherited a lot of its cosmetic changes from the Kiev 5, like the self-timer level and rewind knob. It also introduced the hot shoe for flash sync. It also added a fixed takeup spool.

With the Kiev-4M, the standard lens was changed from Jupiter-8 to Helios-103. The Helios-103 is generally believed to be a very good lens, usually surpassing the Jupiter-8 in reviews.

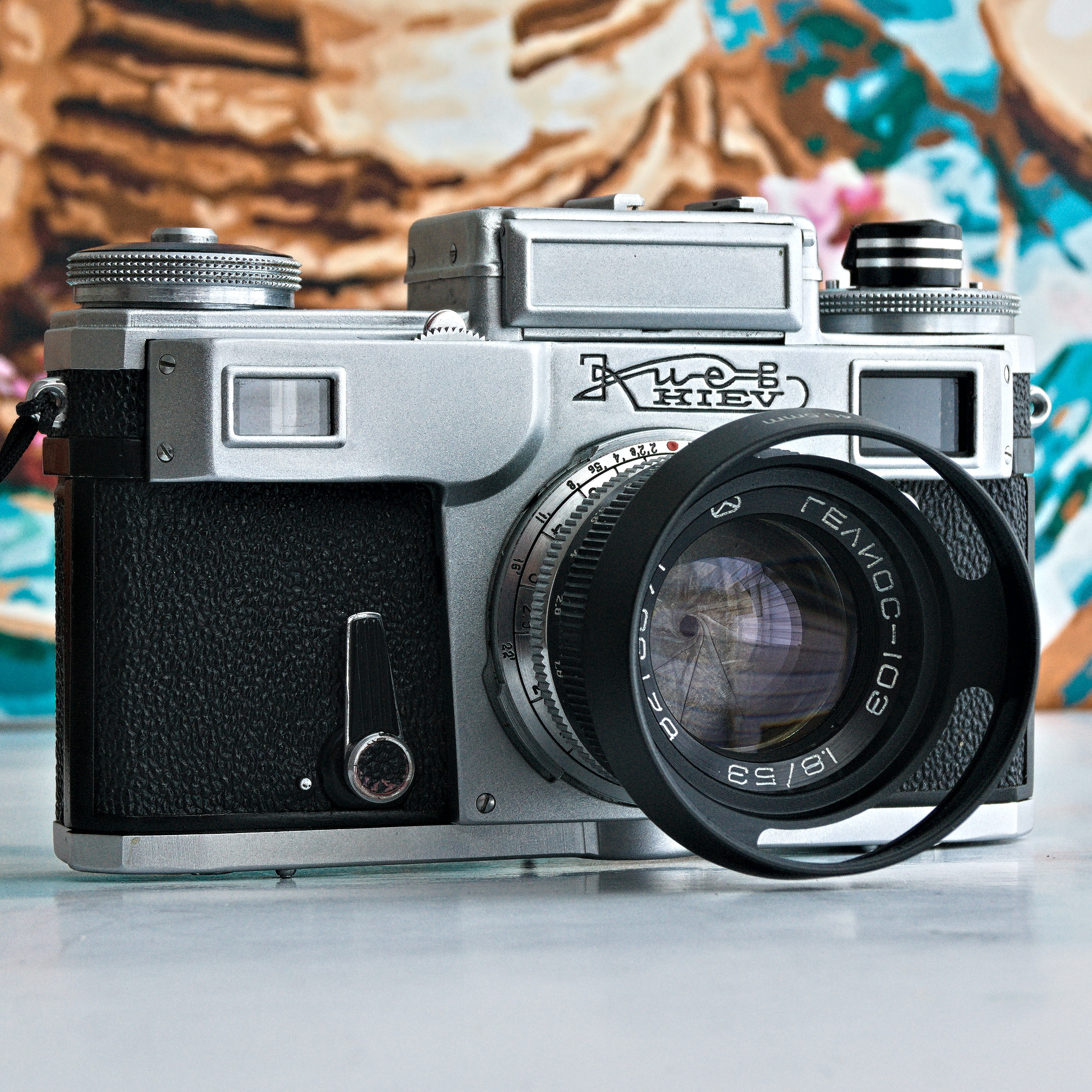
Kiev 4M front with Helios 103

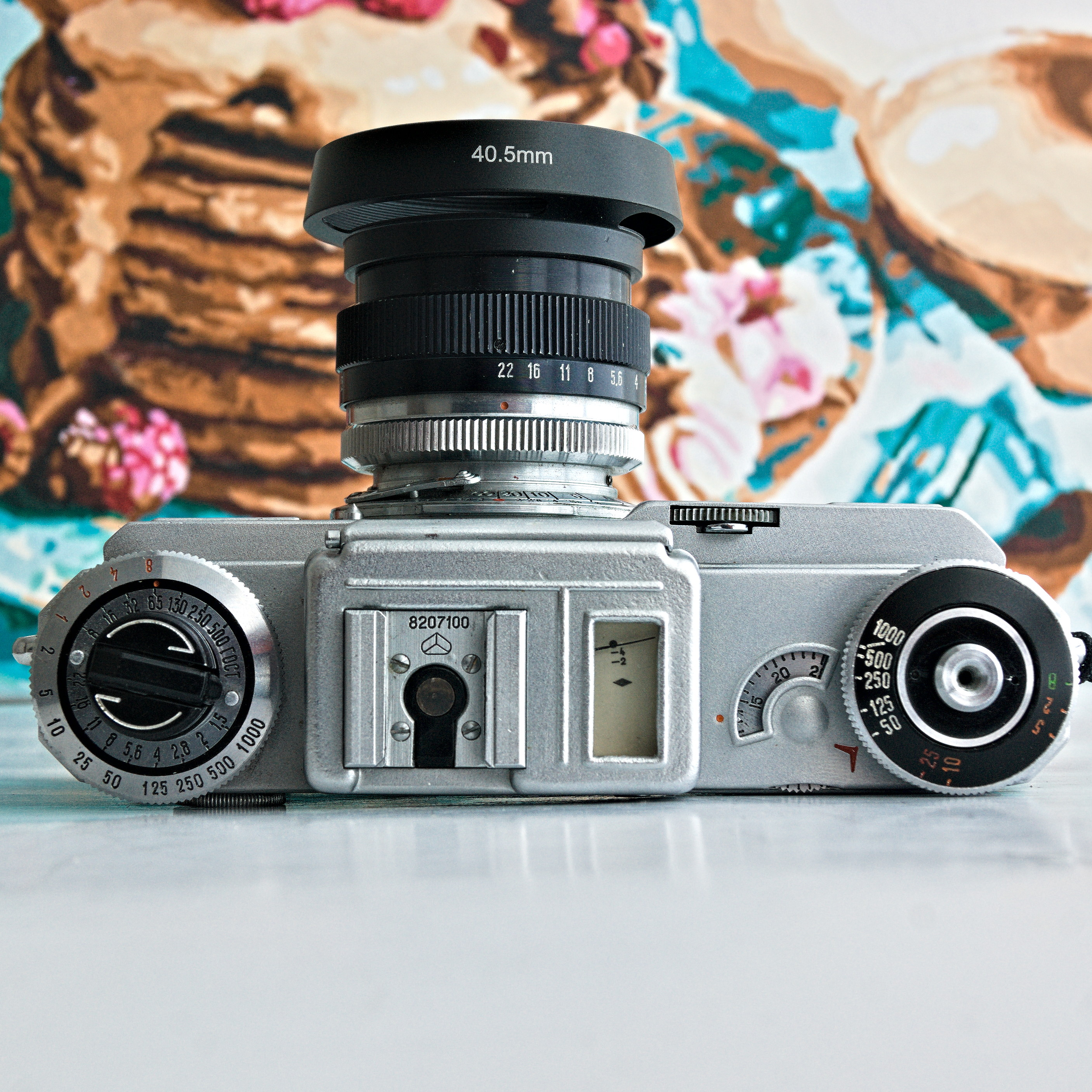
Kiev 4M top

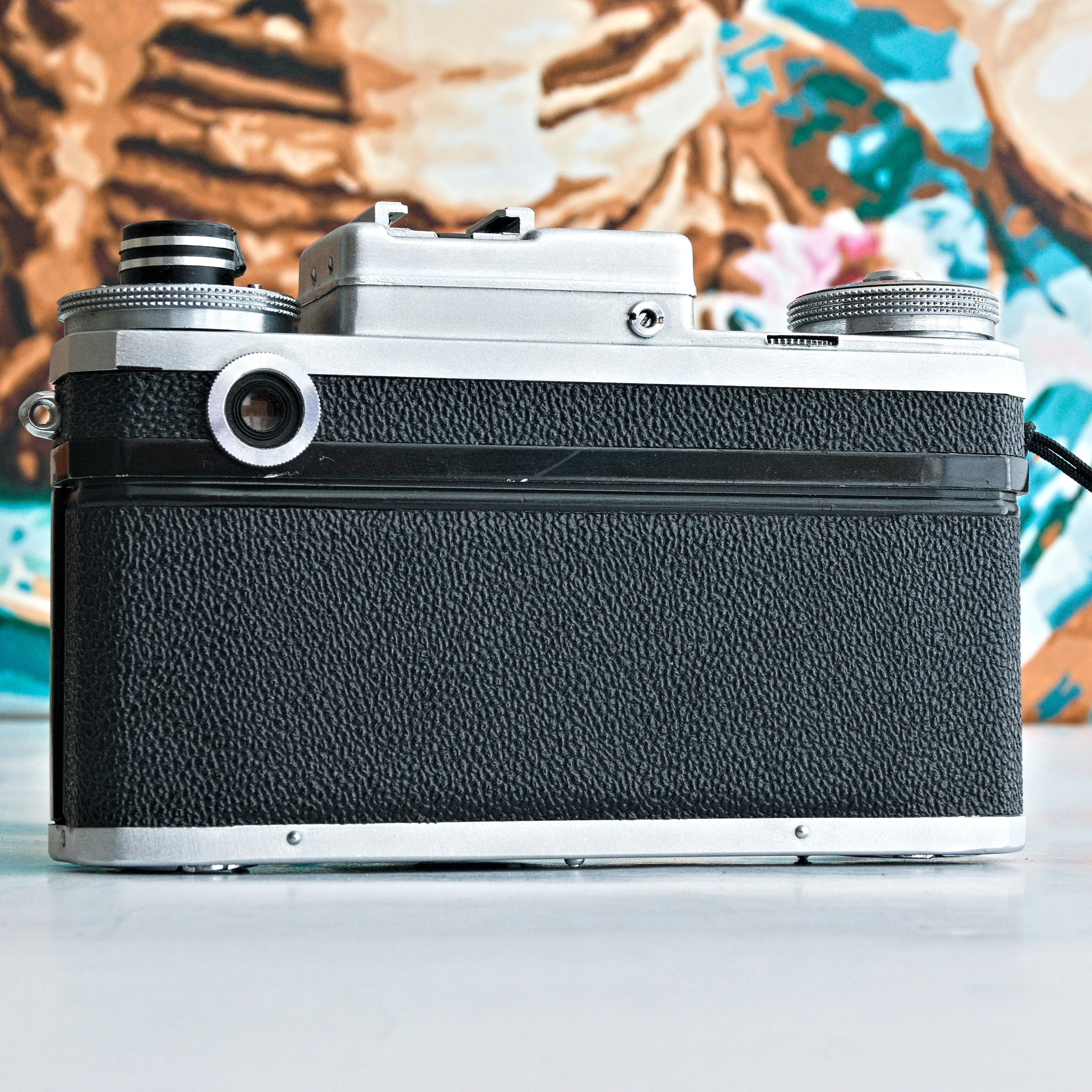
Kiev 4M back

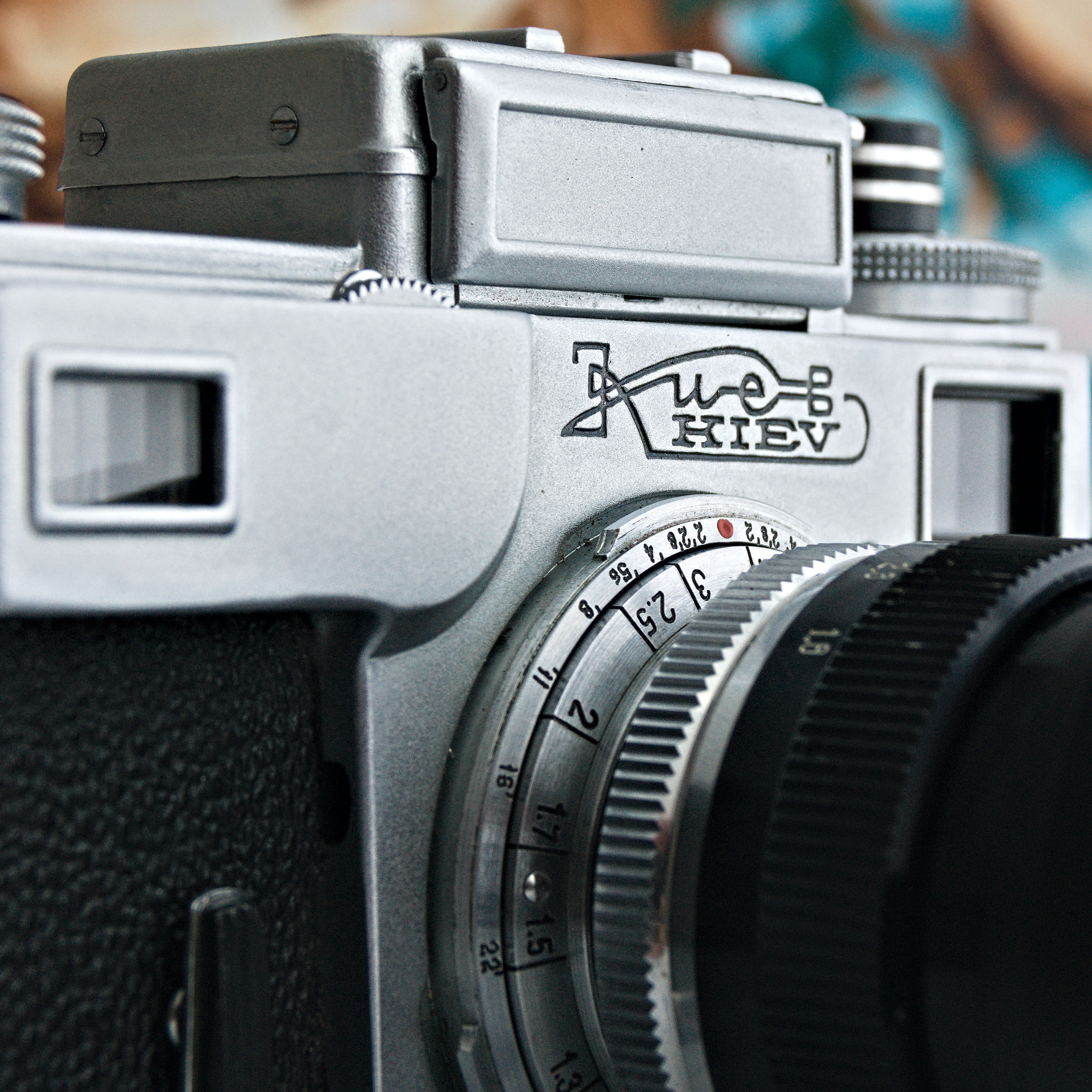
Kiev 4M logo

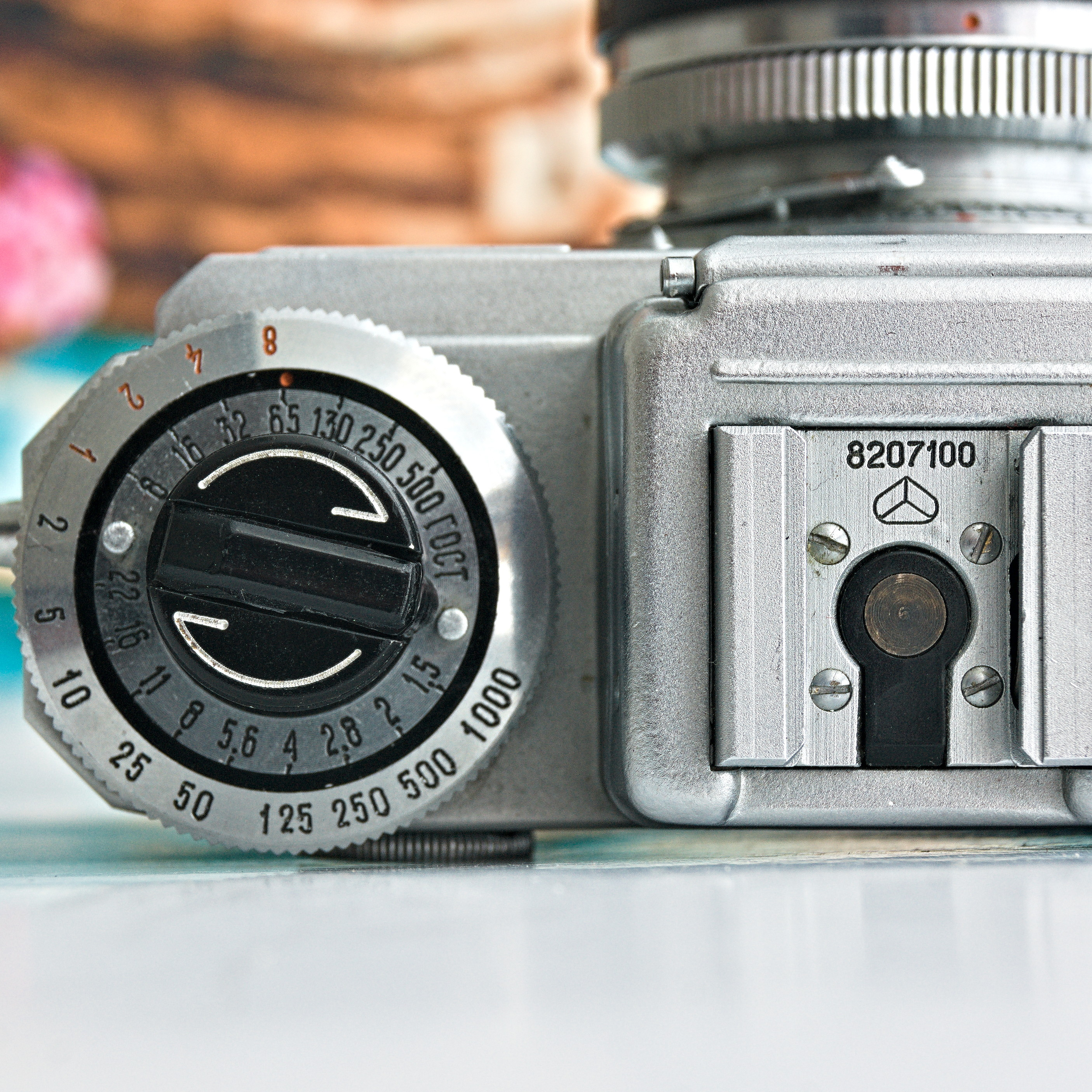
Kiev 4M exposure calculator

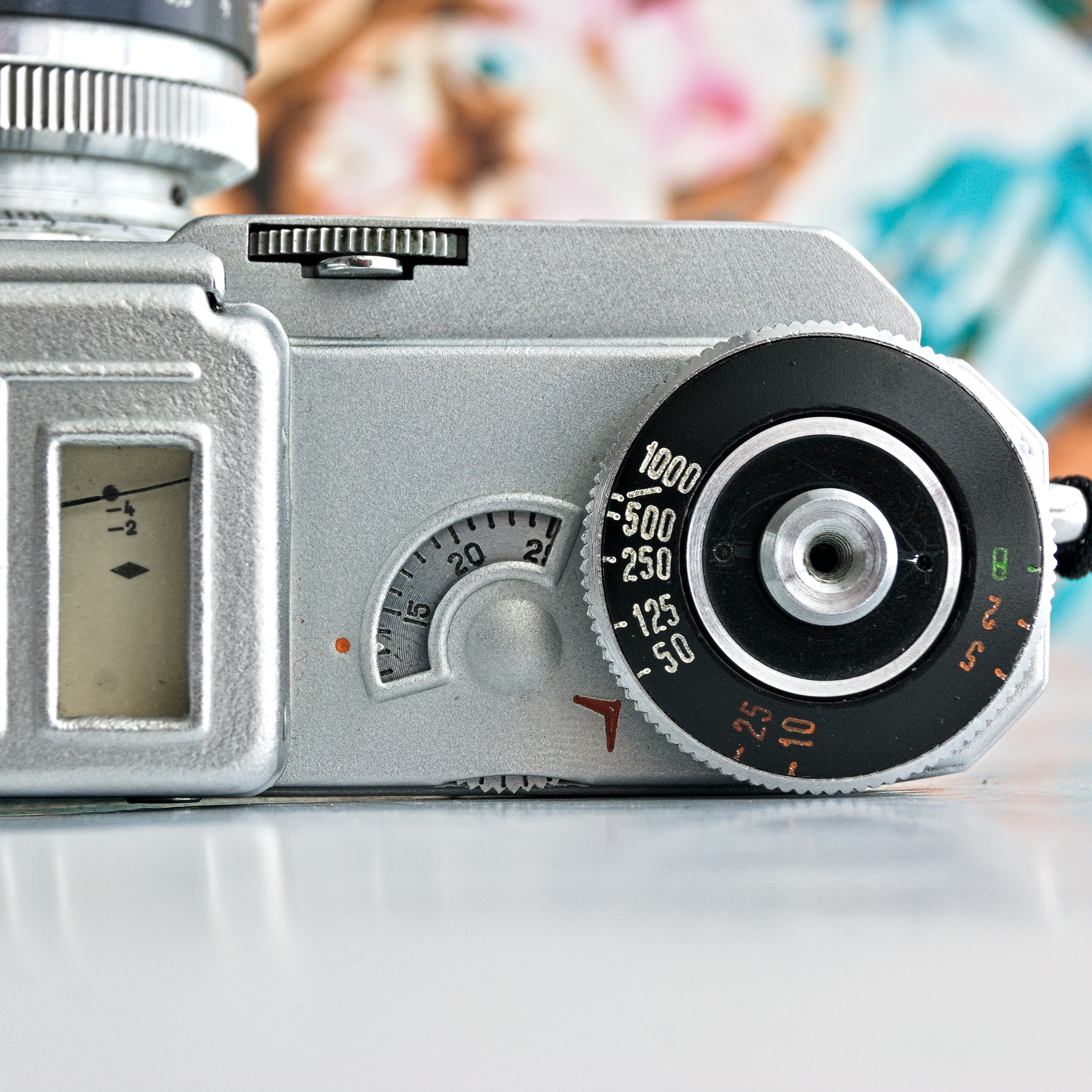
Kiev 4M shutter speed dial

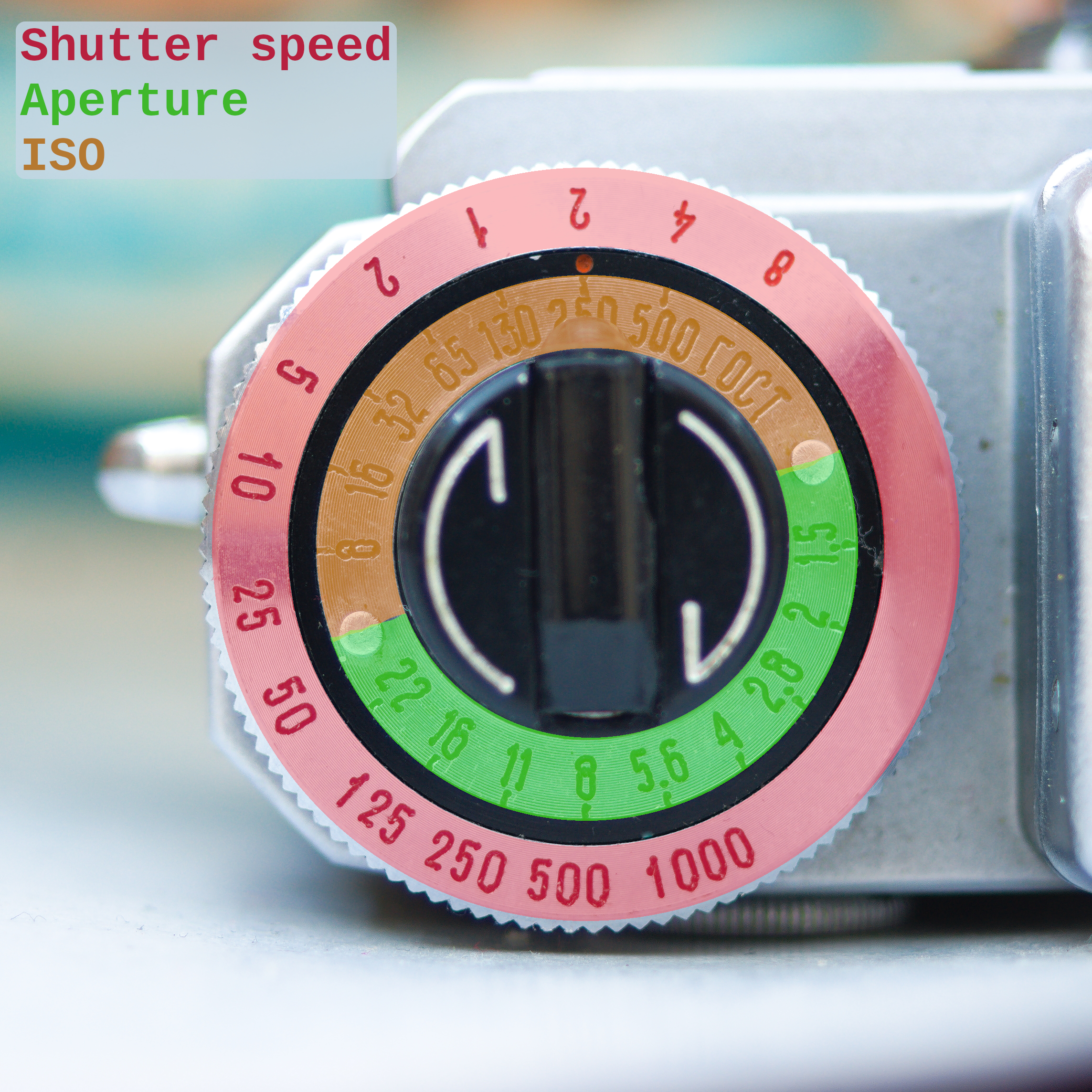
Exposure calculator on Kyiv 4M

=== Kiev TTL ===
The Kiev TTL is a next development of the Kiev rangefinder series, but was never mass-produced, remaining a prototype. It features the same rangefinder as with previous Kiev rangefinders, but has a bright, 1:1 viewfinder. The most noticeable feature is TTL metering. For this, it uses two selenium cells behind the lens. During exposure, those cells move out of the way. The meter needle is visible on the camera top and also in the viewfinder window.

=== Kiev 5 ===
There was also a Kiev 5 with a modernized upper part with integrated meter. Its design drifted far away from the Contax base other Kiev rangefinders were built on. It added a much larger viewfinder, with parallax corrected (only on some versions) frame lines. The viewfinder seems to show what 35mm lens is supposed to see with frame lines showing what 50mm lens would see. Some models even had four angle marks for 85mm lenses. It did not offer the long rangefinder base of previous Kiev rangefinders. All the Kiev 5s offered the selenium light meter. It also replaced the shutter winding knob with a level, rendering it much more user-friendly.

It offered a lens mount similar to the older Kiev rangefinders, but it removed the internal bayonet for 50mm lenses. The external bayonet stayed the same. The camera lost compatibility with all the usual 50mm lenses (Jupiter-8(M) and Jupiter-3, later introduced Helios-103 could not be mounted either) because of that. The camera first used Jupiter-8NB lens, but later came with Helios-94 out of the box.

The camera improved upon the original Kiev models in many ways; however, it never gained popularity as it cost a lot more than the original Kievs, and was sold in parallel to them, causing them to have a comparatively short lifespan. The total production numbers are estimated between 8,000 and 50,000 units, making the camera quite rare.

=== Lenses ===
Lenses made for Kiev rangefinders
Name	Focal length	Maximum aperture	Bayonet
Orion-15	28mm	f/6.0	External
Jupiter-12	35mm	f/2.8	External
Jupiter-3	50mm	f/1.5	Internal
Jupiter-8	50mm	f/2.0	Internal
Jupiter-8M	50mm	f/2.0	Internal
Jupiter-8NB	50mm	f/2.0	External
Helios-94	50mm	f/1.8	External
Helios-103	53mm	f/1.8	Internal
Jupiter-9	85mm	f/2.0	External
Jupiter-11	135mm	f/4.0	External

Some Kiev lenses are the same as Soviet m39 lenses for Zorki/FED rangefinders, but there are some exceptions.

Orion-15 is a very rare lens in Contax/Kiev mount. Unlike the Leica screw mount version of the same lens, this one is not rangefinder coupled.

There are multiple versions of Jupiter-8 lens available in Contax/Kiev mount. The -M version of the lens has click stops on aperture ring and the -NB version uses the external bayonet – it was introduced with Kiev 5, which does not have the internal one. The usual Jupiter-8 is the same lens than in M39.

Helios-94 has the external bayonet and was available as a kit lens on Kiev 5. Not a lot of information can be found online about this lens, but it seems that it cannot be mounted on older Kiev rangefinders – the focus scale of internal bayonet prevents that.

Helios-103 is exclusively available in Contax/Kiev mount. It has the internal bayonet and was a kit lens on Kiev-4(A)M. The lens usually surpasses Jupiter-8 variants in reviews. It has greater resolution than Jupiter-8 lenses and it is also faster.

== Kiev 35mm SLRs ==
Arsenal also made a range of 35 mm SLR cameras. They are not as well known as Zenit cameras.

=== Kiev Automat SLRs ===
The unique Kiev Automat SLRs used their own unique lens mount; only a handful of lenses were available in that format. All these cameras use an unusual fan-shaped shutter. They are collector's items that were not exported.

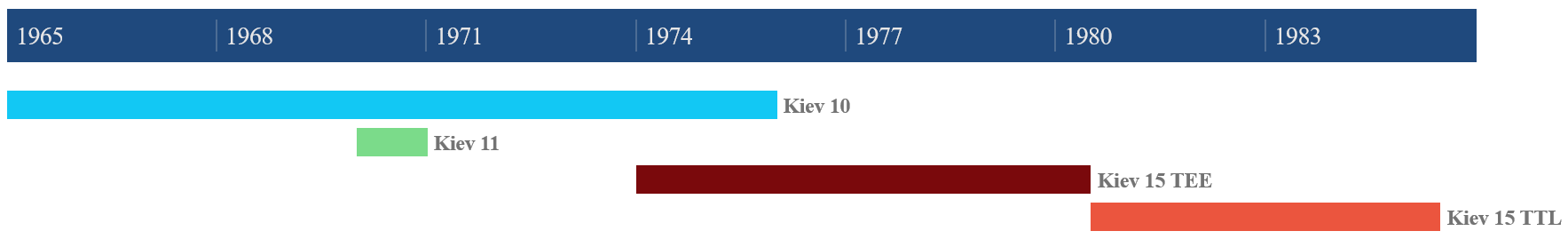
Production timelines of Kiev Automat SLRs.

==== Kiev 10 ====
Kiev 10 was one of the most innovative cameras produced in the Soviet Union. It was one of the first cameras that offered automatic exposure. It also featured its own lens mount, shared with its successors. The camera had a light meter, but it was a selenium one. Its accuracy declines with age.

==== Kiev 11 ====
A development of Kiev 10. Only small quantities of this camera were produced. The main difference was that the light meter was moved from the top to the side. Apparently, this was due to shiny chrome lenses reflecting the sunlight, rendering the center-positioned light meter on Kiev 10 inaccurate.

==== Kiev 15 TEE / Kiev 15 TTL ====
This camera had two names during its lifespan, but these models were identical. The main difference in this model it was added TTL (Through The Lens) metering. Those meters are accurate even nowadays.

==== Lenses ====
Lenses made for Kiev Avtomat SLRs
Name	Focal length	Maximum Aperture
Mir-20 Automat	20mm	f/3.5
Mir-1 Automat	37.5mm	f/2.8
Era-18 Automat	50mm	f/1.2
Helios-65 Automat	50mm	f/2.0
Helios-81 Automat	50mm	f/2.0
Granit Automat	45-80mm	f/3.5
Vega-21 Automat	85mm	f/2.0
Jupiter-9 Automat	85mm	f/2.0
Jupiter-11 Automat	135mm	f/4.0
Tair-11 Automat	135mm	f/2.8
Granit-11 Automat	80-200mm	f/4.5

=== Kiev F SLRs ===
The Kiev F line, named for the use of the Nikon F-mount, was available since around 1980, constituted some of the most westernized 35mm SLRs available in the days of the Soviet Union. To satisfy the large internal demand, there was no discernible export at the time they would have found a ready market in the West. Instead, the Zenit with an external selenium meter was sold in large numbers. It was Soviet policy to export domestic surplus rather than the more desirable items of their manufacture.

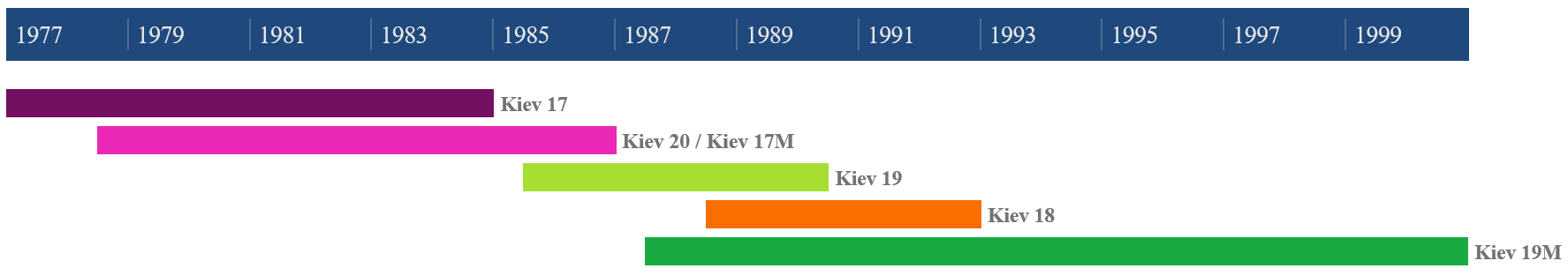
Production timelines of Kiev F SLRs.

==== Kiev 17 ====
Kiev 17 was the first in the F line of Kiev SLRs. It was a fully manual camera. It did not even have a light meter. It is said to be a really unreliable camera.

==== Kiev 18 ====
A rare prototype camera.

==== Kiev 19 ====
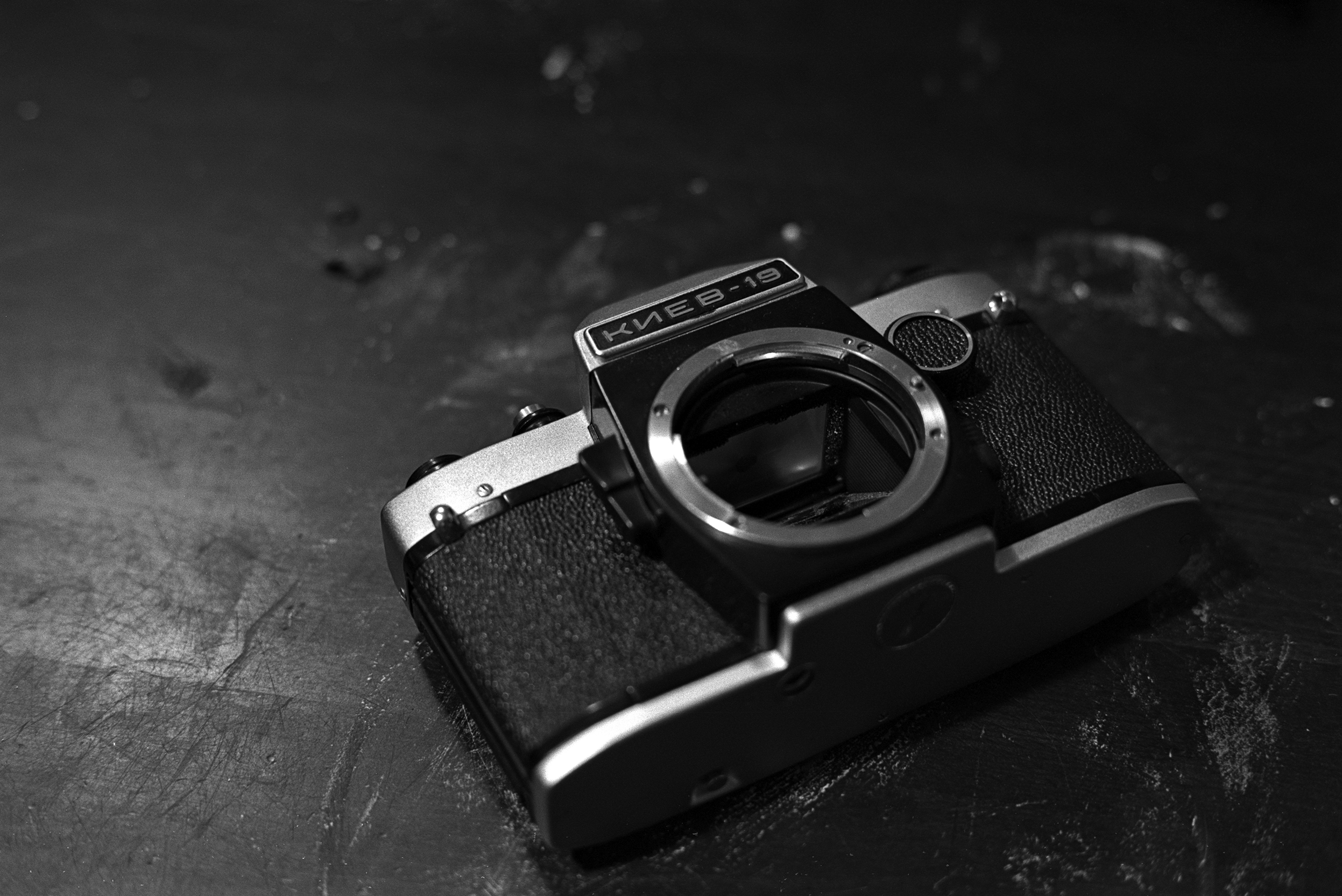
Kiev 19

A much better rated successor to Kiev 17. It offers stop-down TTL metering with helper LEDs in the viewfinder. It has a top shutter speed of 1/500s.

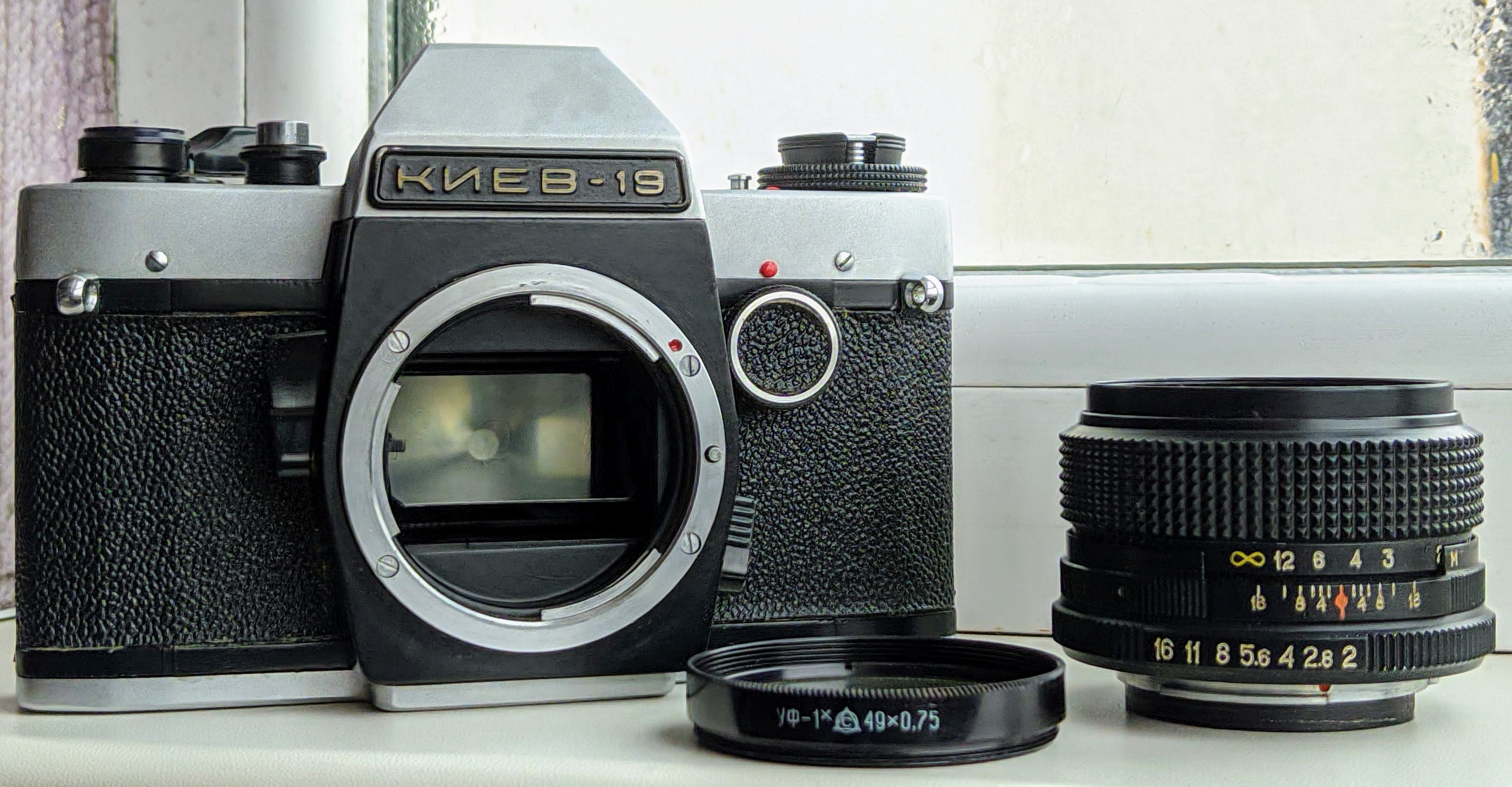
Kiev 19

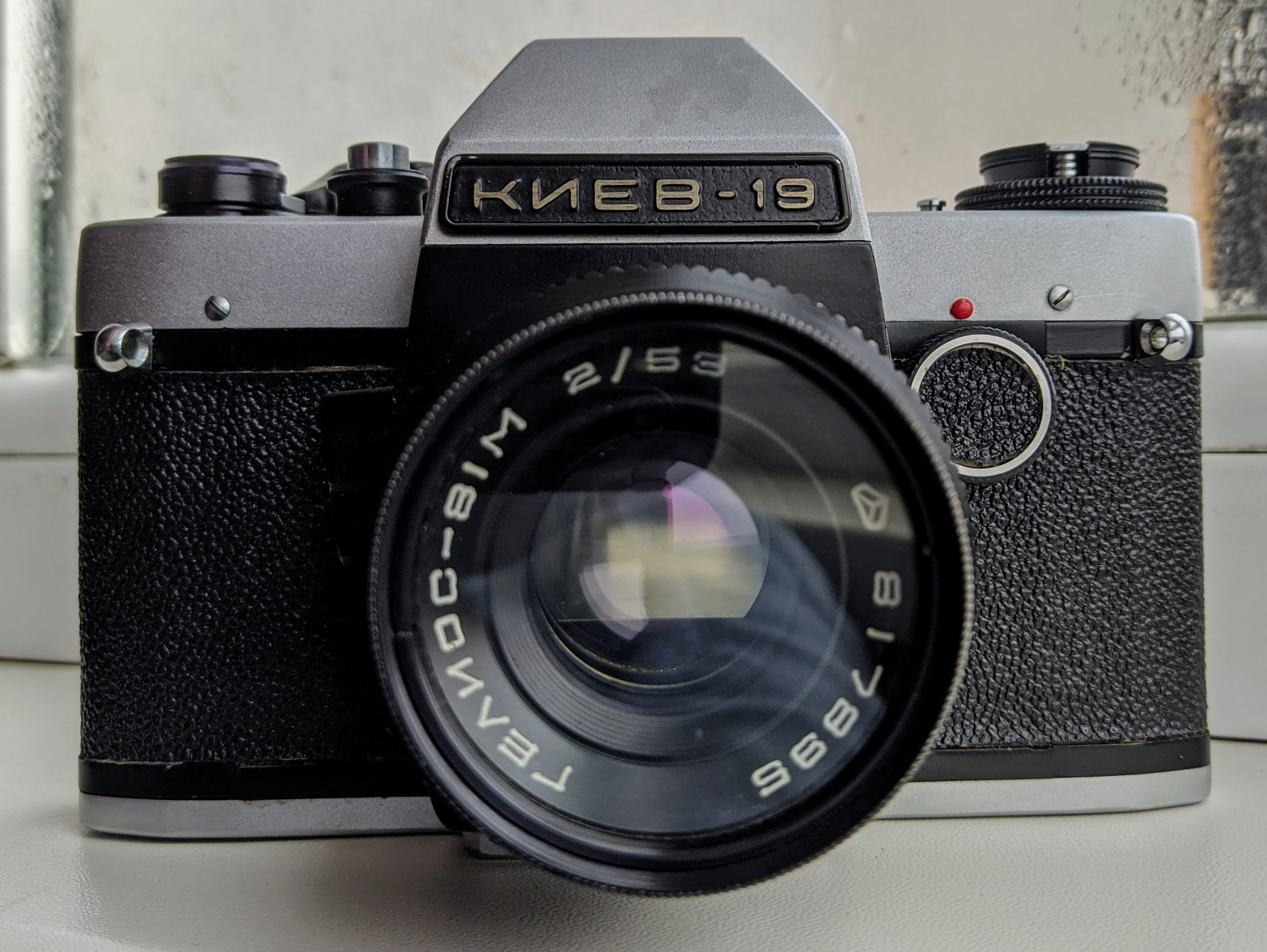
Kiev 19 with Helios 81M and UV filter

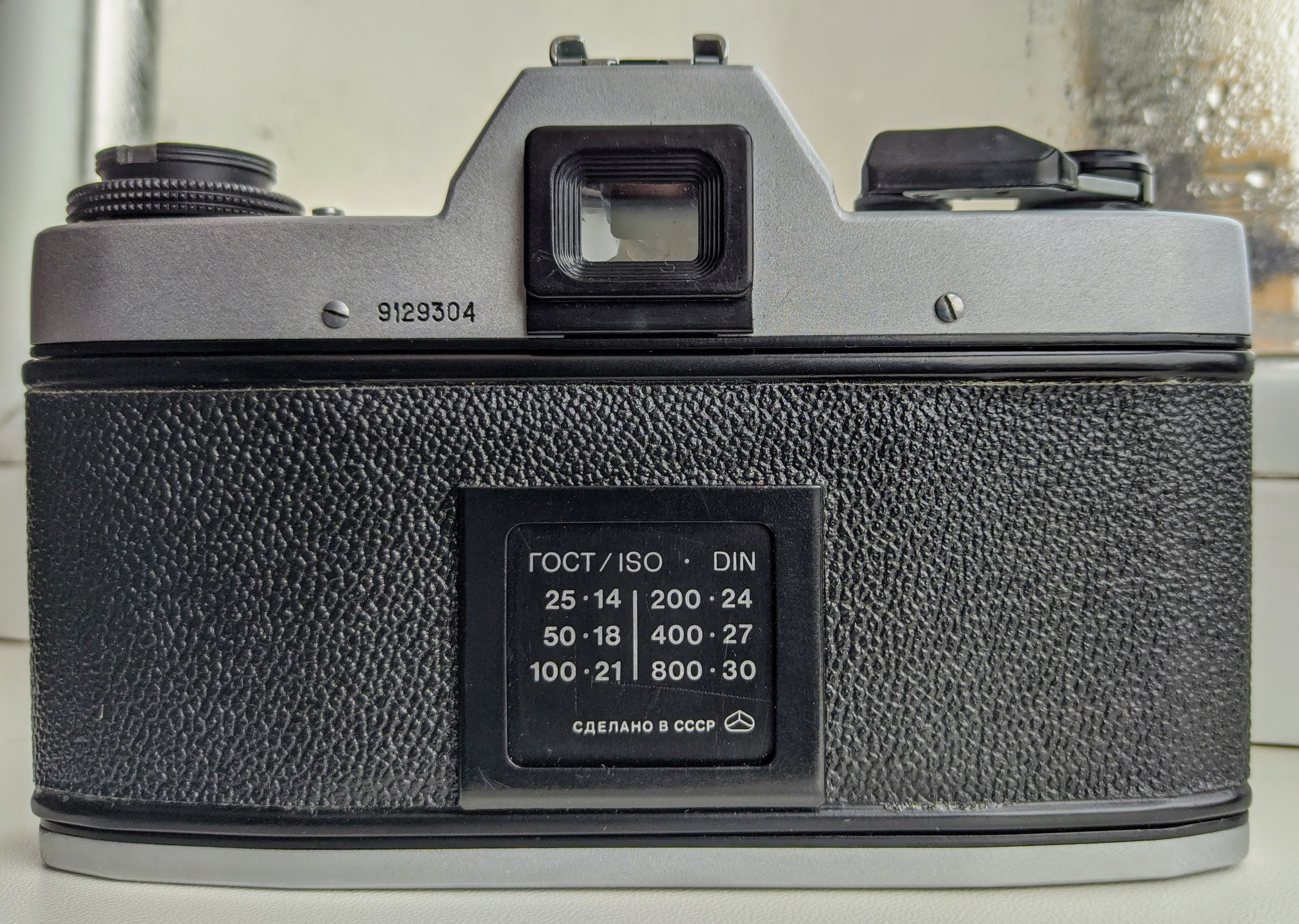
Kiev 19 back

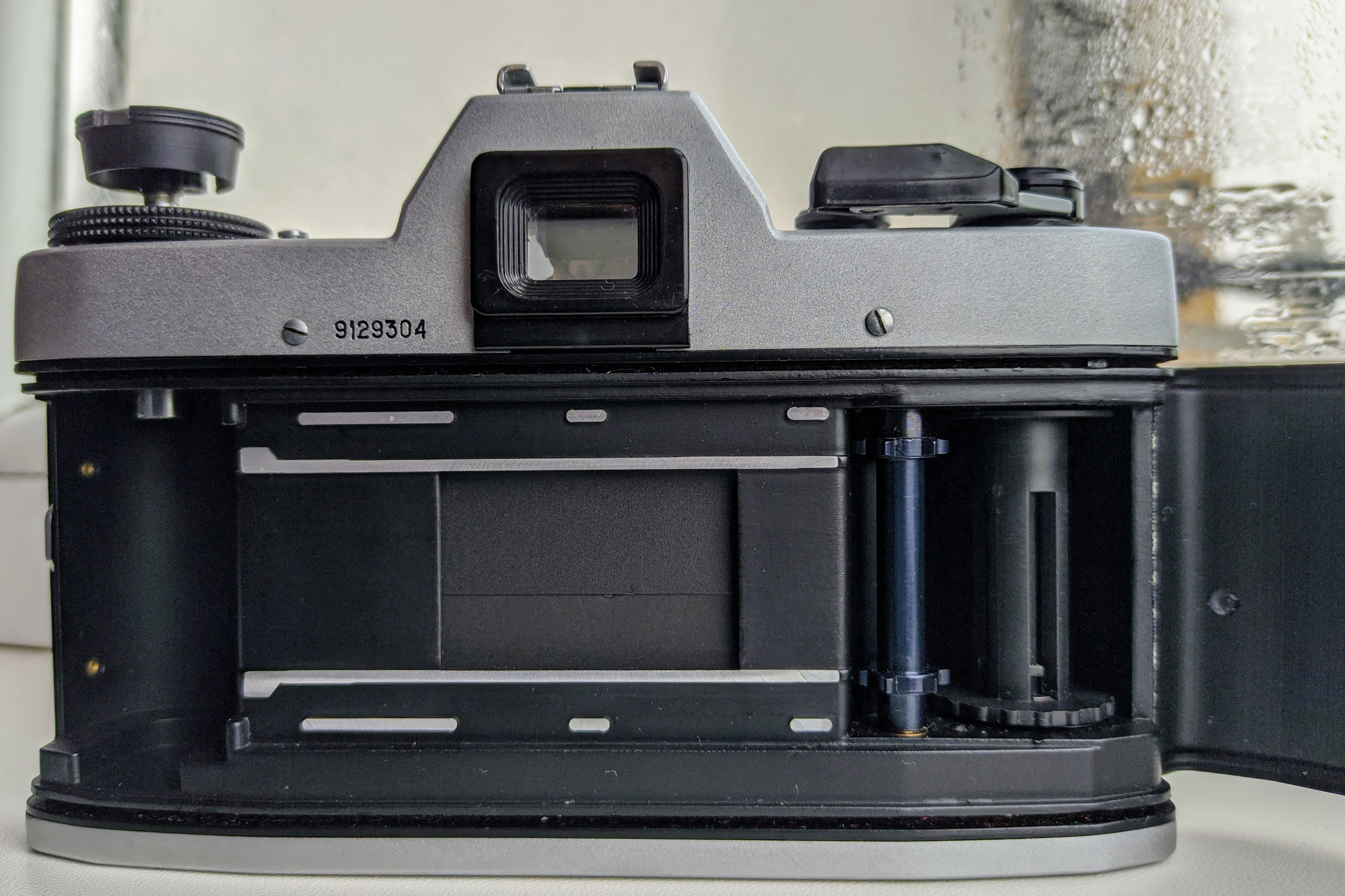
Kiev 19 open back

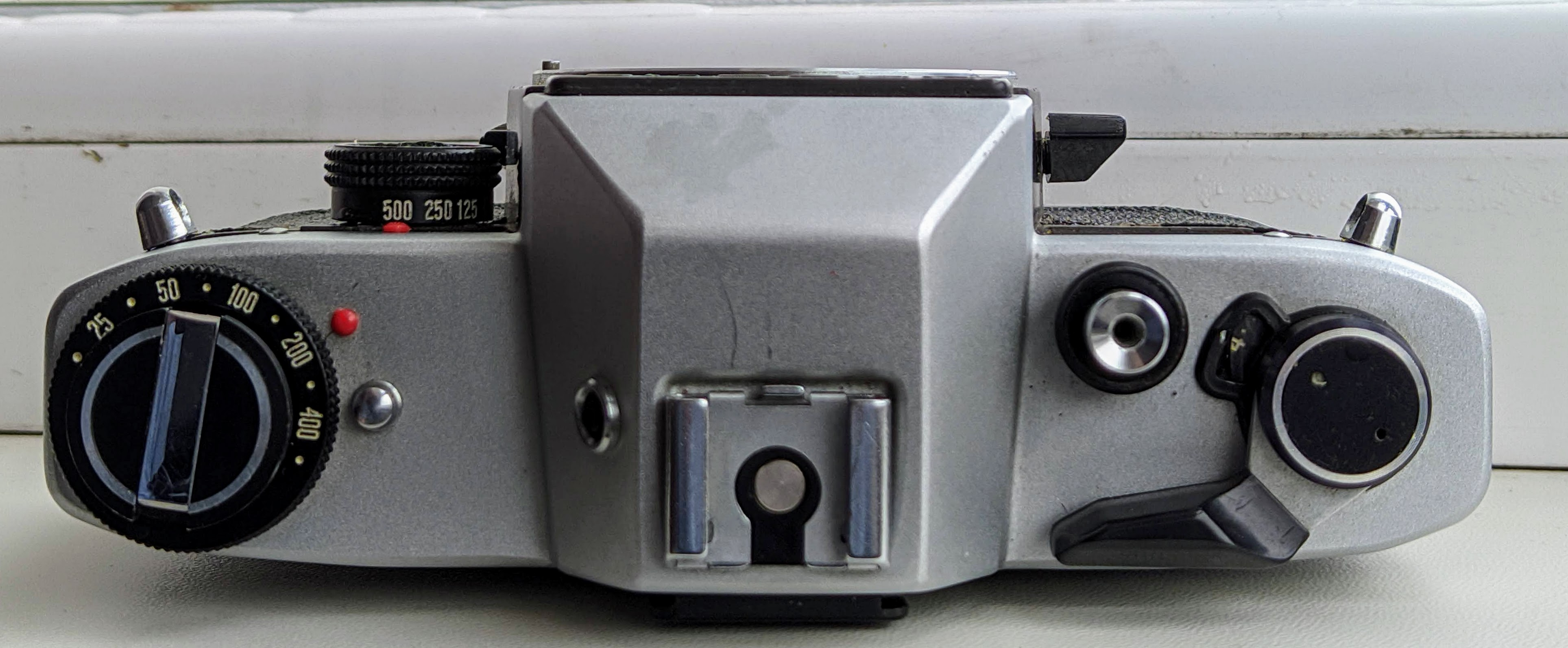
Kiev 19 top

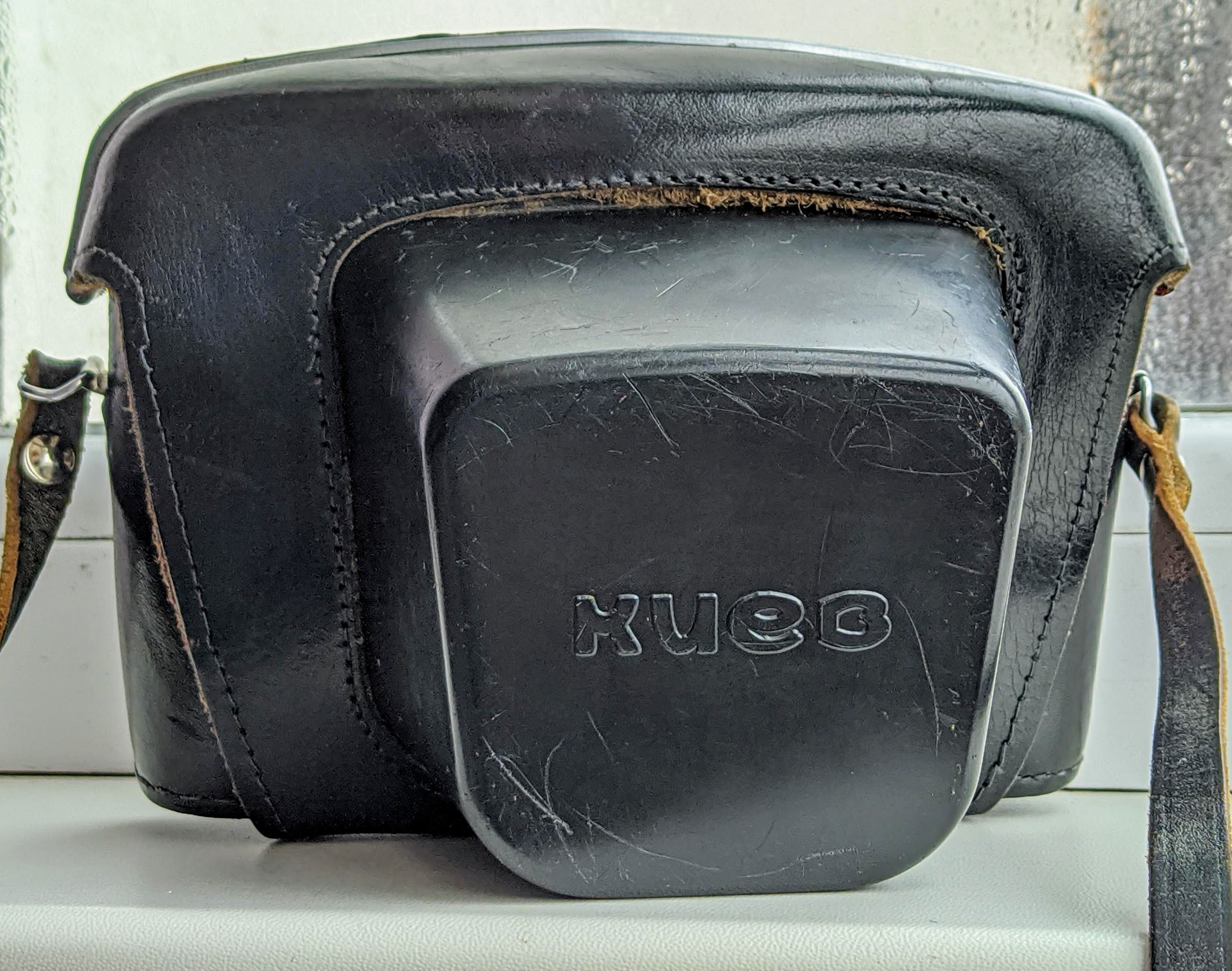
Kiev 19 case

==== Kiev 20 ====
This camera model adds the aperture coupling and the self-timer to Kiev 19 design. It also reads the 1/1000s top shutter speed.

==== Kiev 19M ====
The body type is changed to molded polycarbonate, making it only Kiev SLR not made from metal. Despite its model number, it succeeds the Kiev 20. It has the same 1/500s top shutter speed as the 19, though. This is by far the most produced version of Kiev F SLRs. This model was produced long after Soviet Union fell and was also exported to other countries.

==== Lenses ====
In addition to using Nikon F-mount lenses, the following Soviet lens were produced for the Kiev F cameras:

Lenses made for Kiev F SLRs
Name	Focal length	Maximum Aperture
Peleng-N	8mm	f/3.5
Zenitar-N	16mm	f/2.8
Mir-47N	20mm	f/2.5
Mir-73N	20mm	f/2.8
Mir-20N	20mm	f/3.5
Mir-24N	35mm	f/2.0
Mir-67N	35mm	f/2.8
Helios-81N	50mm	f/2.0
Helios-123N	50mm	f/2.0
Volna-4N	50mm	f/1.4
Volna-8N	50mm	f/1.2
Yantar-14N	28-85mm	f/2.8-3.5
Kaleinar-5N	100mm	f/2.8
Telear-N	200mm	f/3.5
Yantar-20N	35-200mm	f/3.5-4.5
Granit-11N	80-200mm	f/4.5
Yachmar-4N	300mm	f/2.8

== Kiev 35mm compact cameras ==
Kiev produced some 35mm compact cameras as well.

=== Kiev 35 ===
Kiev 35 was the prototype camera of the series. It was presented at Photokina in 1984 with the Industar-99 lens.

=== Kiev 35A ===
Kiev 35A is an actual production version of Kiev 35. It is a compact 35mm camera, with a front cover that folds down to reveal the lens. It is an exact copy of Minox 35, the only difference being that Kiev 35 is around 2mm wider. It offers electronically controlled shutter with aperture priority mode. Shutter speeds range from 4s to 1/500s. It has hot shoe flash synchronization. The film speed settings range from 22 to 700 GOST (15-30 DIN). The lens on this camera is MC Korsar 35mm f/2.8.

=== Kiev 35AM ===
This is a modernized version of Kiev 35A. Besides the cosmetic changes, shutter speeds have been reduced to range from 2s to 1/500s. It also added a self-timer.

== Kiev medium format cameras ==
Kiev medium format cameras can generally be divided into two families.

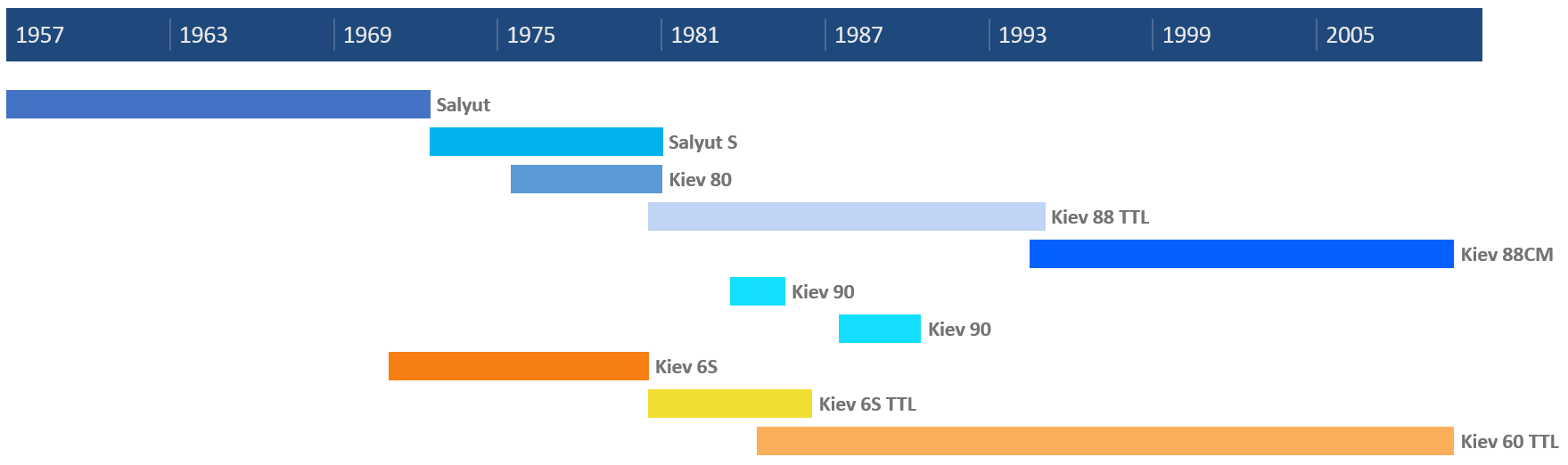
Production timelines of Kiev medium format cameras.

=== Hasselblad 1600F/1000F based Kiev medium format cameras ===
The Kiev brand of medium format cameras started forming, when the Arsenal factory decided to try copying the Hasselblad 1600F around 1956–57. These cameras used a screw-type lens mount similar to the original Hasselblad mount, however, there are mixed reports on compatibility between the two. Most film backs are not compatible between Kievs and Hasselblads due to different gear mechanisms. However, Kiev viewfinders are compatible with the Hasselblad 1600F and 1000F, and even current Hasselblad V-system models.

==== Salyut ====
The Salyut, like Hasselblad 1600F, was a medium format SLR with a modular design - it offered interchangeable lenses, viewfinders and film backs. Because of it being so similar to the original Hasselblad, it is sometimes jokingly called Hasselbladski. The shutter was horizontal running focal plane shutter, offering speeds from 1/2s to 1/500s + B. A rare version included a 1/1000s shutter speed. The lens it had equipped out of the box was Tessar optical formula derivate Industar-29 with semi-automatic diaphragm. The rough production numbers of this camera were around 50,000 units.

The camera was often exported with changed name. The cameras named Zenith 80, Revue 6x6, Revue 80 and Vitoflex all refer to this same camera and have the same features.

==== Salyut S ====
This camera upgraded the original Salyut with extended shutter speed range - now it offered speeds from 1/2s to 1/1000s + B. It also introduced the fully automatic diaphragm. It was equipped with a new lens, Vega-12. It can be found under multiple names as well. It can be found under names Soyuz, Zenith 80 (just like the original Salyut) and Kiev 80. The only difference between the latter and Salyut S is that some Kiev 80s came equipped with a different lens - Volna-3.

==== Kiev 88 (TTL) ====
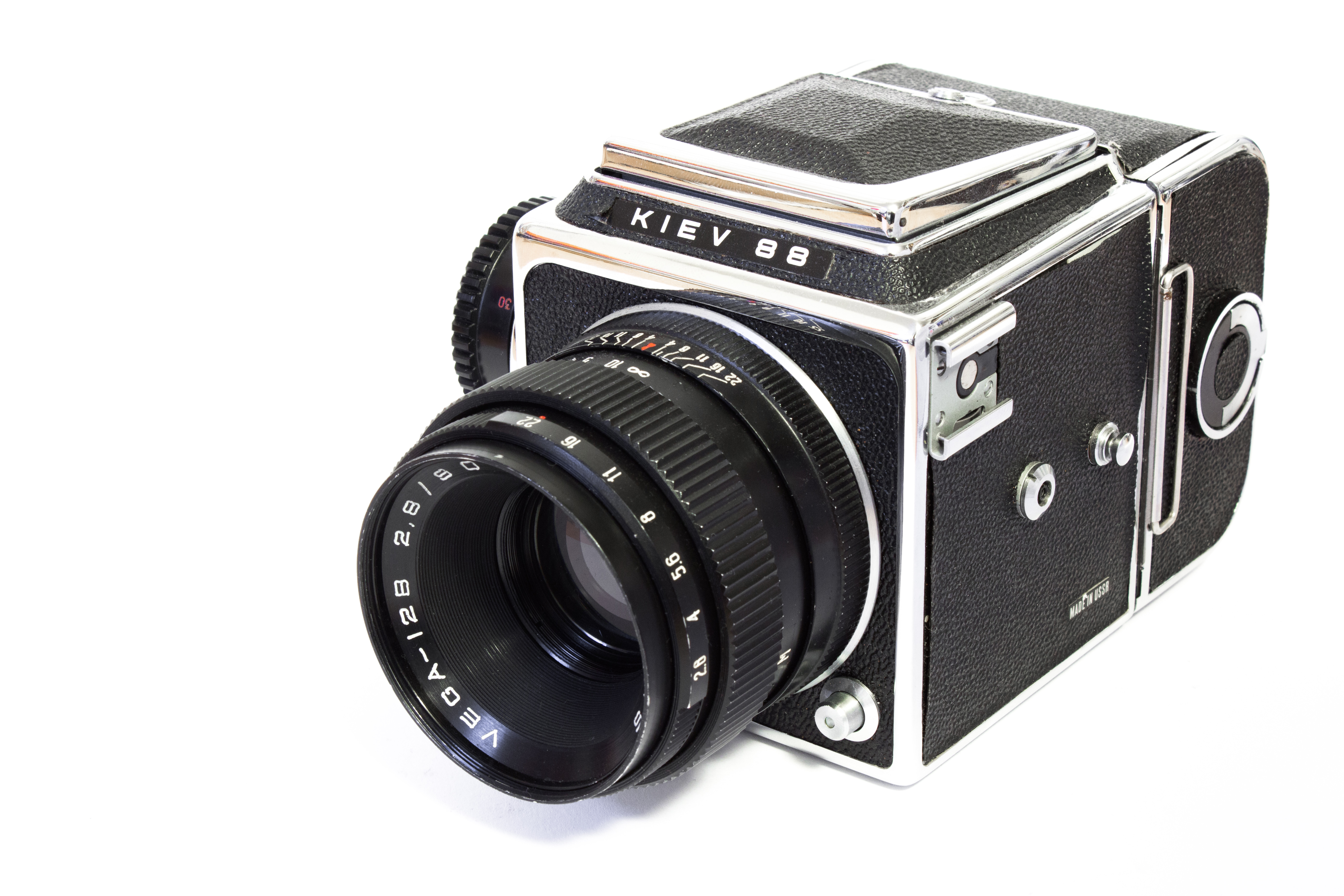
Kiev 88 with Vega-12

The Kiev 88 and Kiev 88 TTL were the same cameras as the Salyut S, but with added hot shoe for flash synchronization. Those cameras were equipped with Volna-3 lenses out of the box. The difference between those two models was that Kiev 88 TTL had a TTL metering prism, where Kiev 88 had a non-metering prism. Since those cameras had interchangeable viewfinders and prisms, the real difference was only what accessories were present in the box when you bought the camera, but the cameras were the same.

==== Kiev 88CM ====
The camera is perhaps the biggest upgrade since Salyut, because it replaced the original screw-type lens mount with the Pentacon Six lens mount, expanding the options for lenses.

==== Kiev 90 ====
This camera is extremely rare (around 2000 units made). It shoots 6x4.5 negatives, in contrast to previous Kievs using 6x6 formats. It offers aperture-priority automatic, semi-automatic and manual modes of shooting. It offers interchangeable lenses, focusing screens, viewfinders and film magazines. It uses the Pentacon Six lens mount and has Volna-3 lens out of the box. The shutter speeds range from 4s to 1/1000s + B.

=== Pentacon Six based Kiev medium format cameras ===
The other family of Kiev medium format cameras are based on Pentacon Six and probably inspired by Zenit 70. Those cameras look like enlarged 35mm SLRs. They use the same breech-lock lens mount as Pentacon Six, allowing them to use all the lenses made for that system, including, but not limited to, lenses made by Meyer Optik Görlitz, Carl Zeiss Jena, Schneider Kreuznach (for the Exakta 66), Kilfitt and others in addition to lenses made by Arsenal Factory. These cameras have a simpler frame-advancement mechanism than the Pentacon Six but it is often poorly adjusted at the factory resulting in incorrect frame spacing. This problem can be fixed.

==== Kiev 6S ====
This is a 6x6 SLR which can use both 120 and 220 film. Shutter release button is located on the left of the camera. It has interchangeable viewfinders. It uses a horizontally running focal plane shutter with speeds ranging from 1/2s to 1/1000s + B. By default it was delivered with Vega-12 lens. There are export versions which instead of КИЕВ on the nameplate say KIEV, the lens as well changes from Вега to Vega. It came with either a waist-level finder which lets the user compose the photo while looking into the camera, but comes with the disadvantage of the image being reversed left-to-right or the option of a non-metered pentaprism finder.

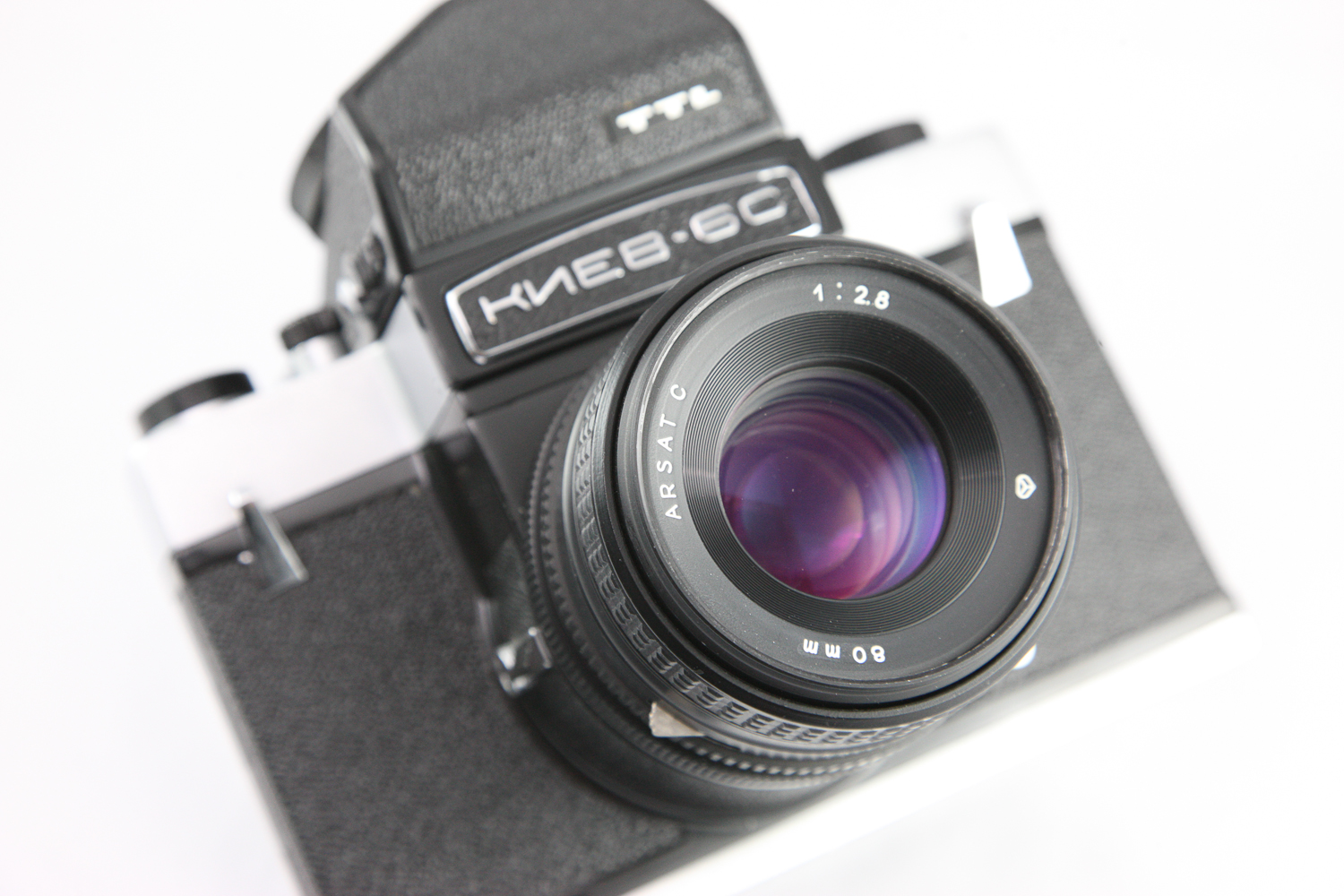
Kiev 6S TTL

==== Kiev 6S TTL ====
Almost the same camera as the original Kiev 6S, but had a different front plate - the Kiev logo is now written in chrome on black background. It offered a CdS TTL metering prism out of the box.

==== Kiev 60 TTL ====
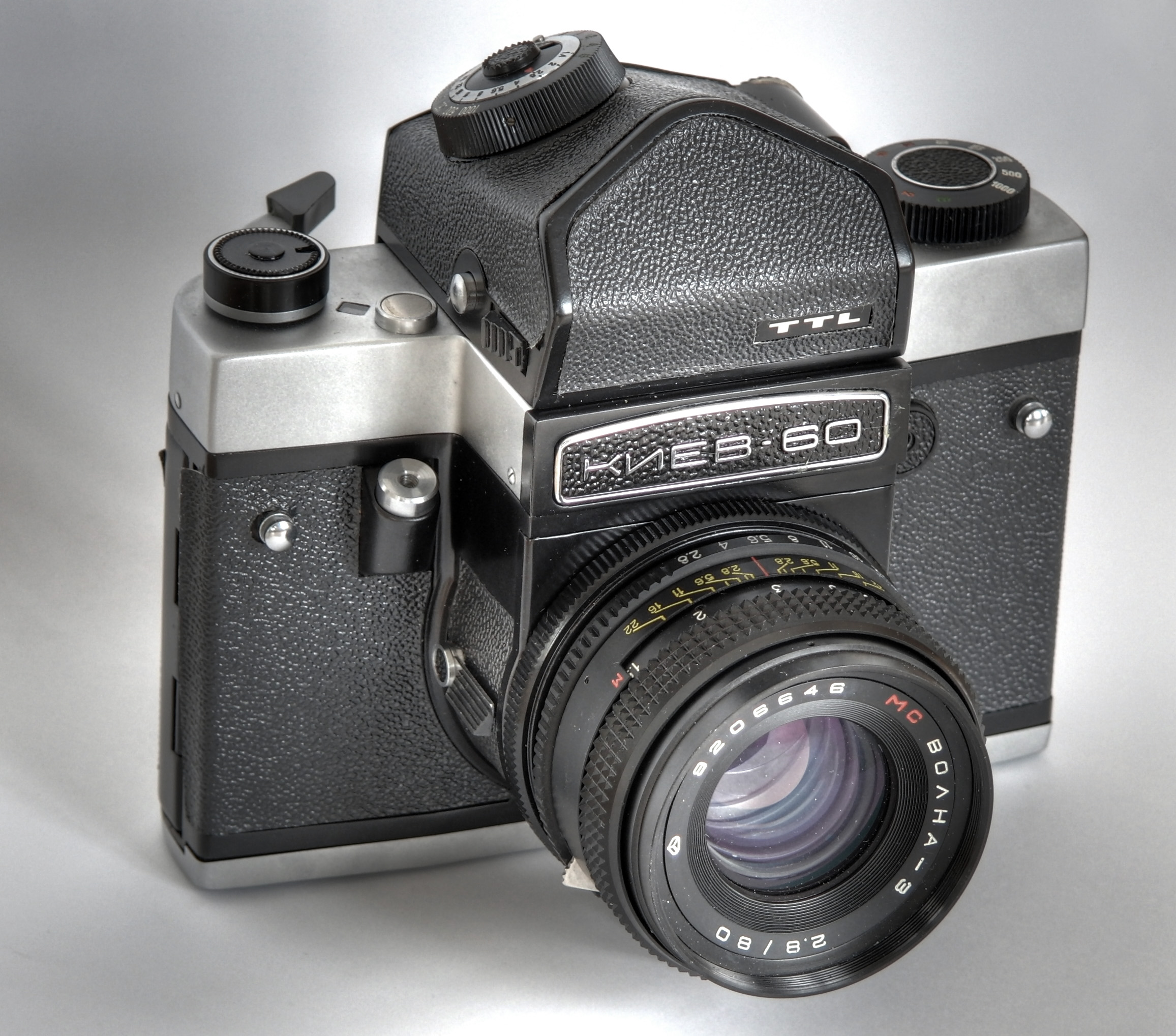
Kiev 60 TTL

The current Kiev 60 has a more conventional right-handed shutter release, but does not take 220 film. Otherwise, it is a mechanically similar camera as the Kiev 6S but it is the only Pentacon Six based model that can be modified with mirror lock up. Compared to the 6S, using a flash is also much easier because on the left side of the camera there are threads to which you screw in a cold shoe adapter and that makes it so you do not have to handhold a flash as with the 6S.

=== Attractions and problems of Kiev medium format cameras ===
The low price of the Kiev medium format cameras has attracted many amateur photographers wishing to enter the medium format camera market on a budget. Some have reported that the prices of a Kiev Hasselblad-type camera setup with other Russian or Ukrainian components, such as lenses, viewfinders and film magazines, can be just a fraction of the price of a similar Hasselblad setup.

On the other hand, prices of Pentacon Six cameras are comparable to prices of its Ukrainian counterparts. One of the reasons for the lasting demand for these cameras is the price of the lenses that can be used on them. Despite the cheap price (compared to Pentacon Six mount lenses from other manufacturers) the Kiev lenses are optically excellent, with many of the lenses being based on Carl Zeiss Jena designs.

Historically, the Arsenal plant is reported to have generally poor quality control and some buyers have reported receiving cameras with small cosmetic or functional defects. Many of the less favorable reviews come from people comparing the camera directly to the more expensive Hasselblad models. The quality control seems to have fluctuated throughout different years of production though, and thus varies from camera to camera. Hasselblad-like Kiev cameras are based on camera designs even Hasselblad gave up on. Having poor quality control only made things worse.

For this reason, a number of third party distributors have appeared offering Kiev cameras in improved, quality controlled forms. However, some have taken advantage of the Arsenal plant's variable quality to add value through varying levels of third-party rebuilding, modification, and testing of the Arsenal-supplied cameras.

The cameras, however, still have a number of quirks that no simple servicing will remove. The most notable quirk is that the shutter speed on some of the original Hasselblad-like Kiev cameras should only be changed after cocking the shutter (spring-loading the shutter mechanism and advancing the film). Changing the shutter speed on an un-cocked camera will damage the timing mechanism. This is not a problem with the Pentacon Six-based Kievs. There are also mixed reports that the shutter speed dial should be turned only clockwise, never counter-clockwise. This is certainly known to be an issue with some cameras modified by Hartblei to add a mirror lock-up (MLU) feature. Other cameras may or may not have this problem, so special care is advised.

=== Common modifications of Kiev medium format cameras ===
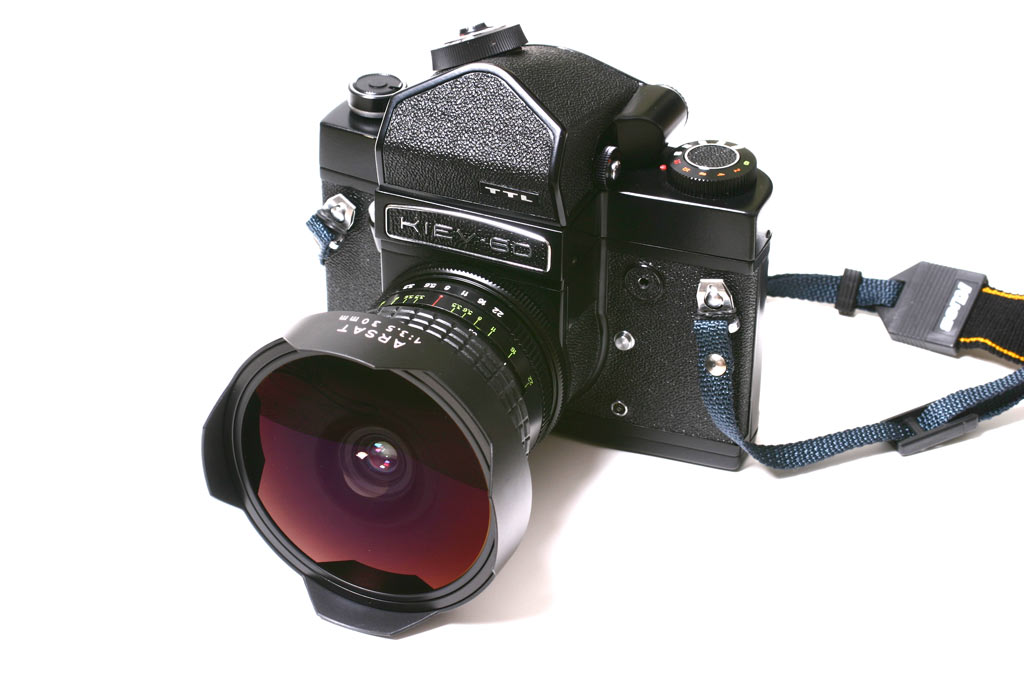
Kiev 60 modified for the 6×4.5 frame and MLU with Arsat 30mm Fisheye lens

The vendors that sell Kiev cameras outside of the former Soviet Union often make their own modifications to the cheap and basic cameras coming from the factory.

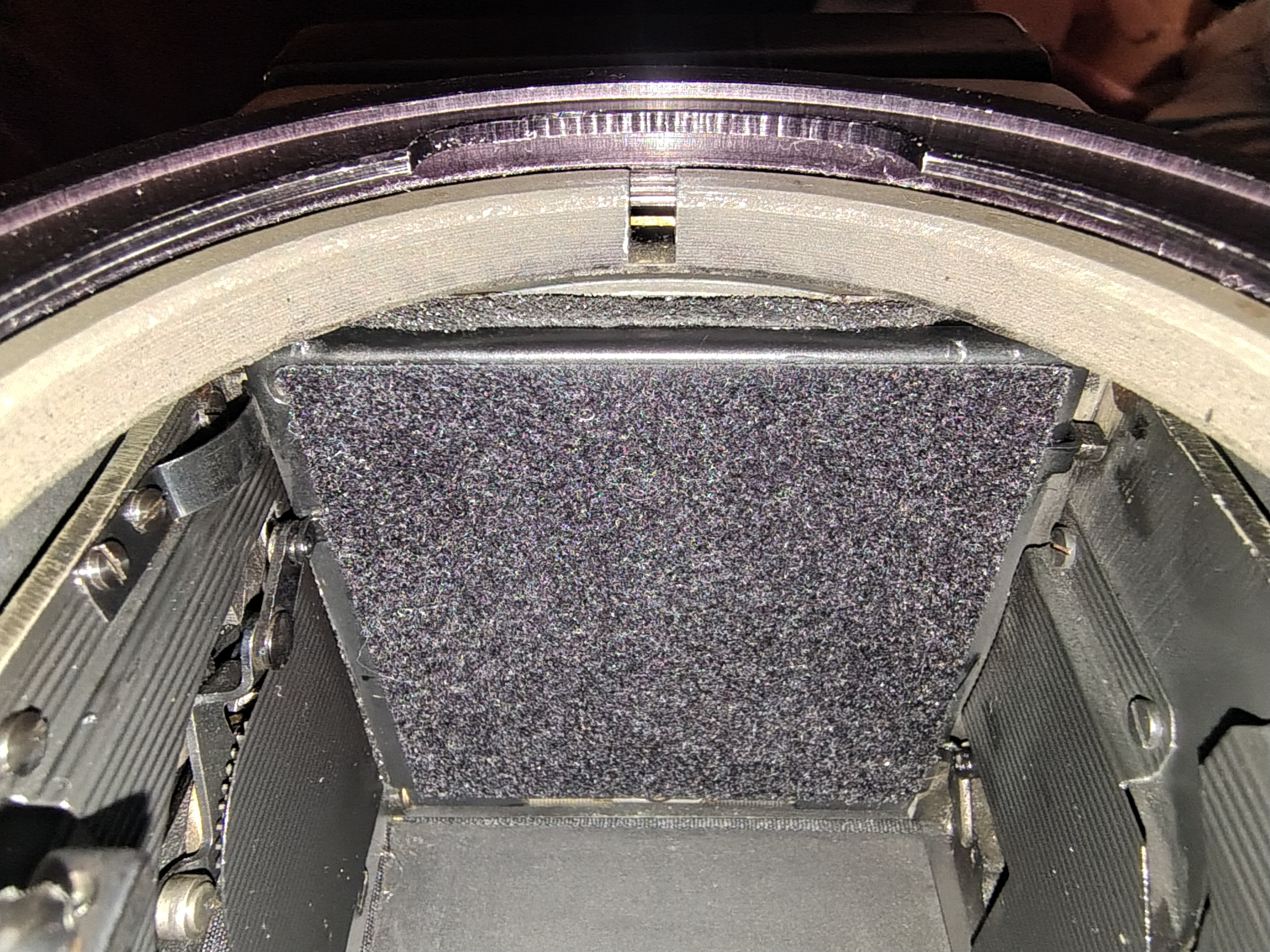
Kiev 6C mirror box showing rebound spring on the top left

Mirror lock-up is a feature that can be added to these cameras. This removes the small amount of motion blur that can be caused by the mirror hitting the top of the mirror box just before the shutter opens, however, other sources of motion-blur still remain. This is most useful when the subject is greatly magnified (when using long or telephoto lens) or with macro photography. Some of these cameras have a really strong mirror slap, creating motion blur even when not shooting handheld, so MLU is a really useful feature if you tend to use the slower shutter speeds. Another modification that can be performed is the addition of a flat spring located on the side of the mirror box, it prevents the mirror from rebounding and causing further vibrations after the initial impact allowing easier use of slower shutter speeds during handheld shooting.

The Pentacon Six-based Kievs are sometimes modified to shoot with a 6x4.5 frame size, often called Kiev 645 or similar, yielding more pictures per roll of film in a "print-friendly" rectangular format versus the original camera's square 6x6 format. But since the film feeds sideways, the 6x4.5 variant produces photos in the portrait aspect, as opposed to the landscape aspect seen in most other cameras. On the other hand, the Hasselblad-based Kievs can shoot the 6x4.5 frame size by simply using a different film back. The 6x4.5 film back is interchangeable with 6x6 backs on others, for example instant film backs, while the Pentacon Six-based Kiev frame size modifications are permanent.

The original Pentacon Six lens mount on the Kiev 88CM accepts all the lenses from Arsenal, but has trouble accepting some other lenses, for example Carl Zeiss Jena Sonnars for Pentacon Six. It is, however, possible to overcome this issue by third party modifications that allow Kiev 88CM to accept all the lenses made for Pentacon Six lens mount. Kievs cameras utilizing Hasselblad-like screw mount can be modified to Pentacon Six lens mount, which is more desirable because of the greater amount on lenses available. Since the register distance of the new mount is shorter than the original one, the mount is located inside the camera body and allows to use all existing screw-mount lenses with an adapter - this is desirable, if we already own screw-mount lenses but want to modify the lens mount to extend the lens options. In that case, we don't have to buy all the same lenses with a different mount.

=== Lenses ===
Lenses made for Kiev medium format cameras
Name	Lens mount	Focal length	Maximum Aperture
Zodiak-8	B, V	30mm	f/3.5
Mir-26	B, V	45mm	f/3.5
Mir-3	B, V	65mm	f/3.5
Mir-38	B, V	65mm	f/3.5
Industar-29	V	80mm	f/2.8
Volna-3	B, V	80mm	f/2.8
Vega-2	V	85mm	f/2.8
Vega-12	B, V	90mm	f/2.8
Industar-56	V	110mm	f/2.8
Vega-28	V	120mm	f/2.8
Kaleinar-3	B, V	150mm	f/2.8
Jupiter-36	B, V	250mm	f/3.5
Telear-4	B, V	250mm	f/3.5
Telear-5	B, V	250mm	f/5.6
Tiar-33	B, V	300mm	f/4.5
Arsat	B	500mm	f/5.6
ZM-3	B, V	600mm	f/8.0

Lenses for Kiev medium format cameras come in two different lens mounts - mount B and mount V (be careful, in Cyrillic В actually represents V with Б being B as we know it). Mount B represents the Pentacon Six mount lenses and V represents Salyut screw-mount. Most of the lenses were made in both mounts, but some are exclusive to just one of them - refer to the table above.

In the 1990s, the lenses were all renamed to Arsat, making harder to distinguish them from one another, but optically, they are one of the lenses listed above. When the lenses were renamed, mount designations were changed. Pentacon Six mount lenses were renamed to Arsat C where screw-mount lenses kept the letter B.

Shift and Tilt-Shift lenses made by third-parties, based on the 45mm and 65mm optics are also available. These lenses allow photographers to take advantage of the Scheimpflug principle for achieving greater apparent depth of field without adjusting the aperture, and gain other controls similar to those found on view cameras.

=== Use in space ===
The Kiev 6S went to space in a modified variant called the "KIEV-C SKD". Around 33 sets were produced. This camera was used on the Zond 6 and Zond 7 spacecraft, the Zond 6 crash landed but Zond 7 managed to take photos of the earth and moon. The camera was much wider and heavier than the regular variant and had a motorized film wind mechanism, it also came with a remote shutter release. Shutter speeds remained the same and the 3 lenses made for it were based on regular models and greatly modified for use in space with different coatings and specifications. the 90/2.8 Vega 12B turned into the Vega 12-C which came in a f/2.8 and f/4 variant that uses 11 aperture blades instead of the regular 6, it also has special yellow coatings but what their purpose is remains undocumented. The Tair-33 turned into the Tair-33-S and remained 5.6/300, according to some information, there was also a version for "unmanned shooting" - the lens did not have a focusing ring. The 65/3.5 Mir-3 also saw a space variant called the Mir-3-S, but not much is known about it.

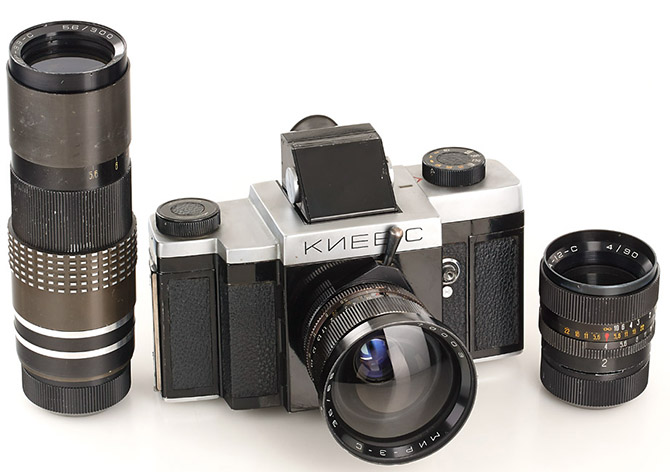
The Kiev-S with its three lenses

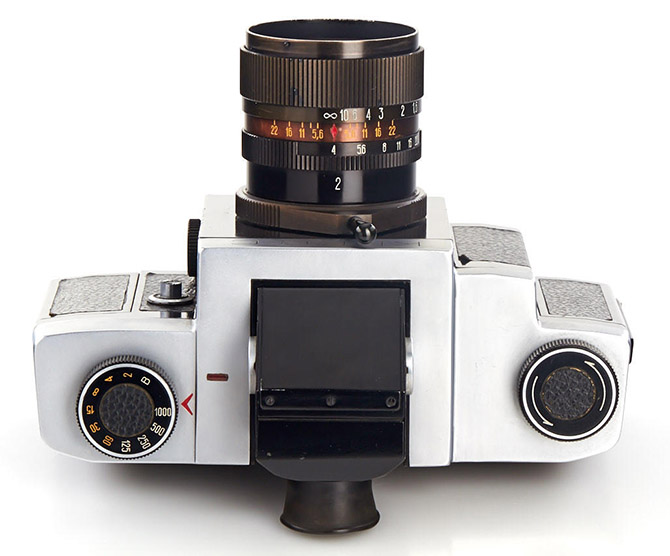
Top down view

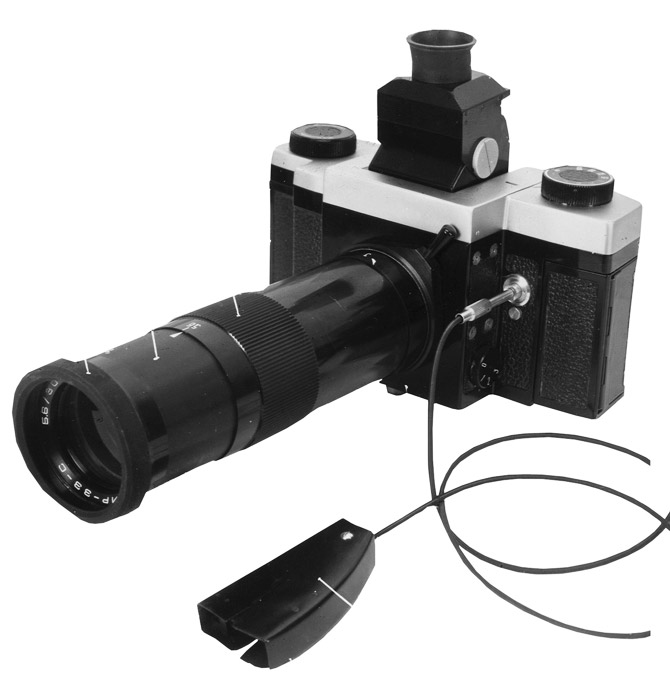
The remote shutter release

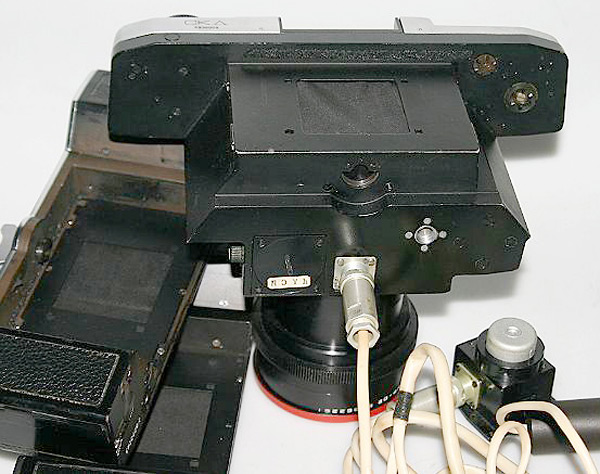
Open back showing the wiring

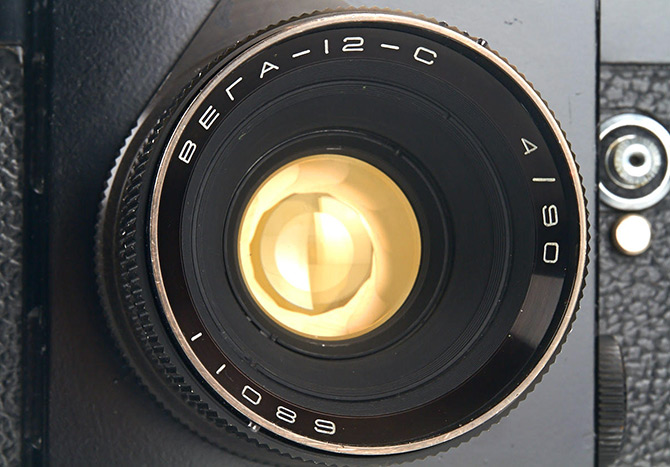
Vega 12-C 90/4

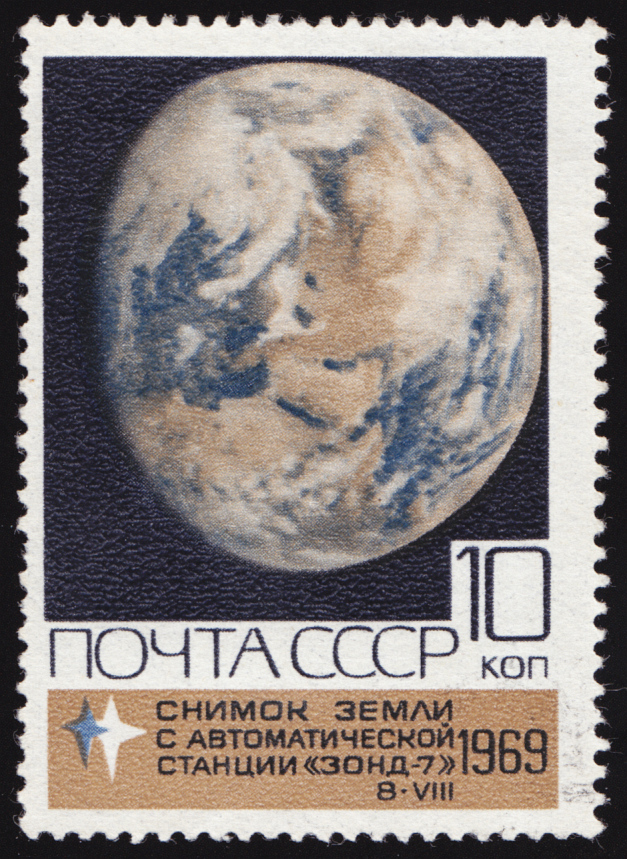
a picture of the Earth from Zond 7

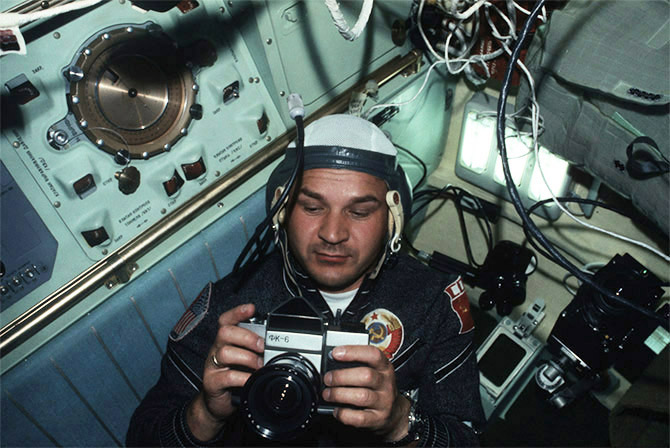
Valery Kubasov using a Kiev FK-6

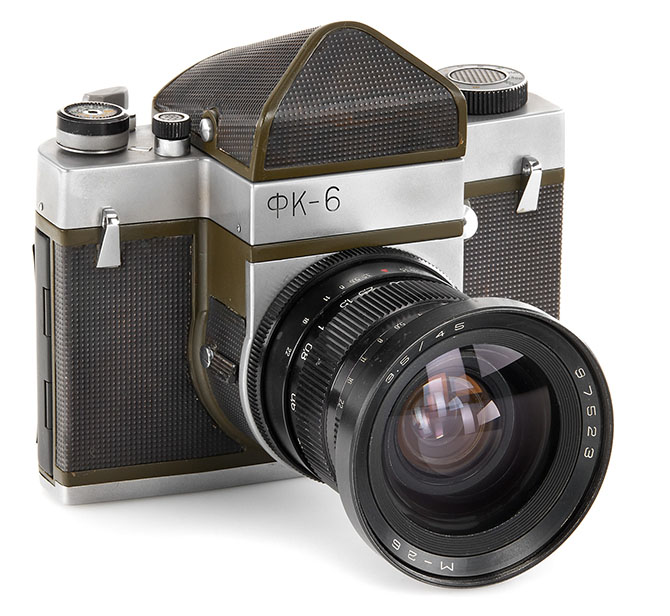
Kiev FK-6 Space Camera
