= Pentacon =

German optics company

- Industry: Imaging
- Founded: Dresden, Germany; 1964; 62 years ago
- Headquarters: Dresden, Germany
- Products: cameras and other optical equipment
- Website: http://pentacon.de

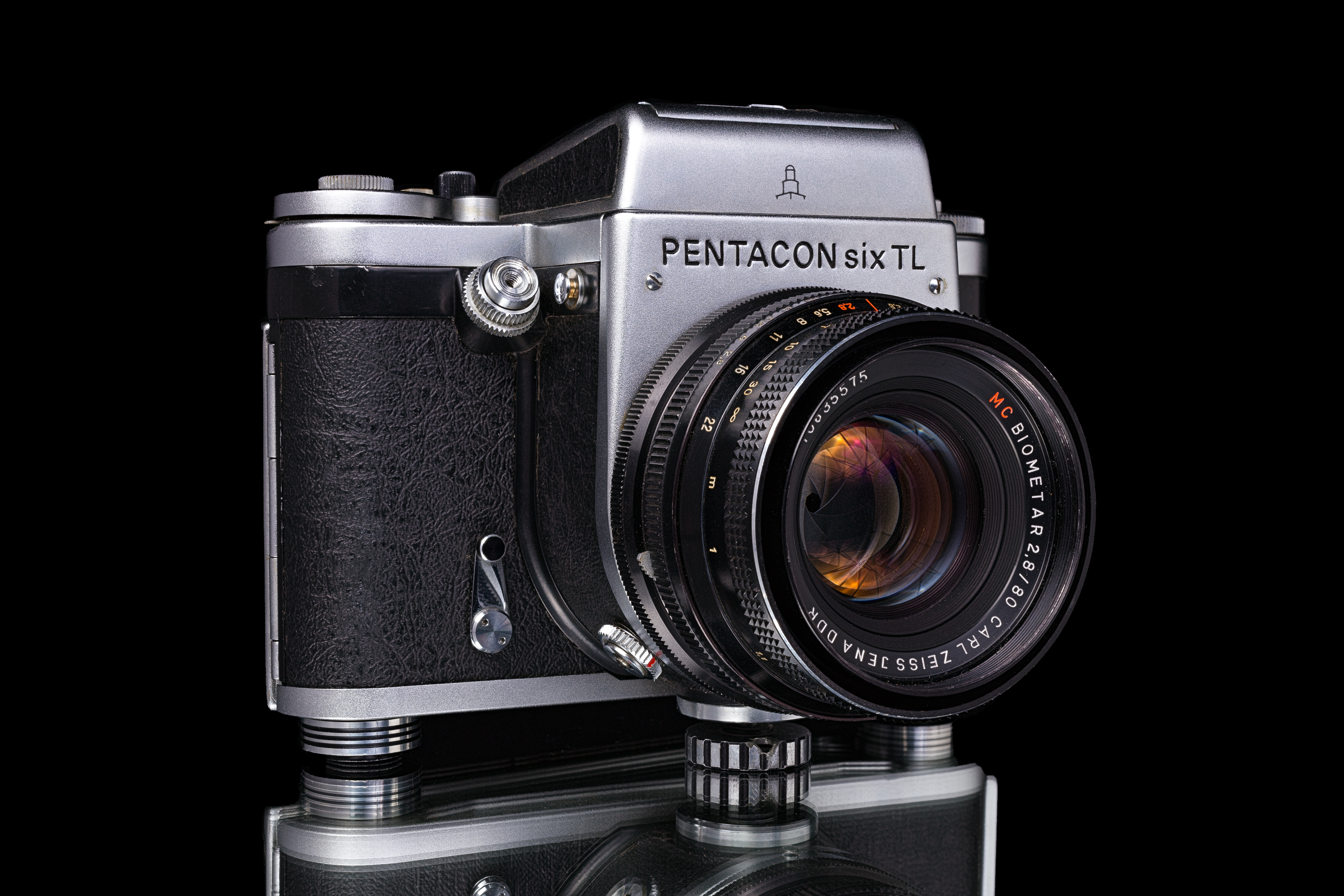
Pentacon Six TL medium format camera

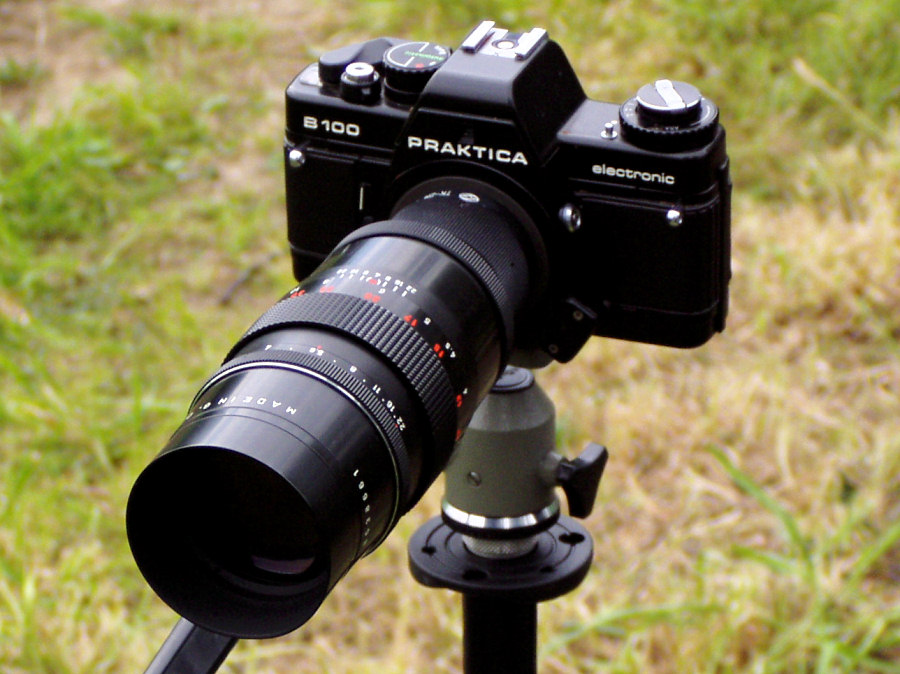
Pentacon 200mm/4 lens mounted on Praktica B100

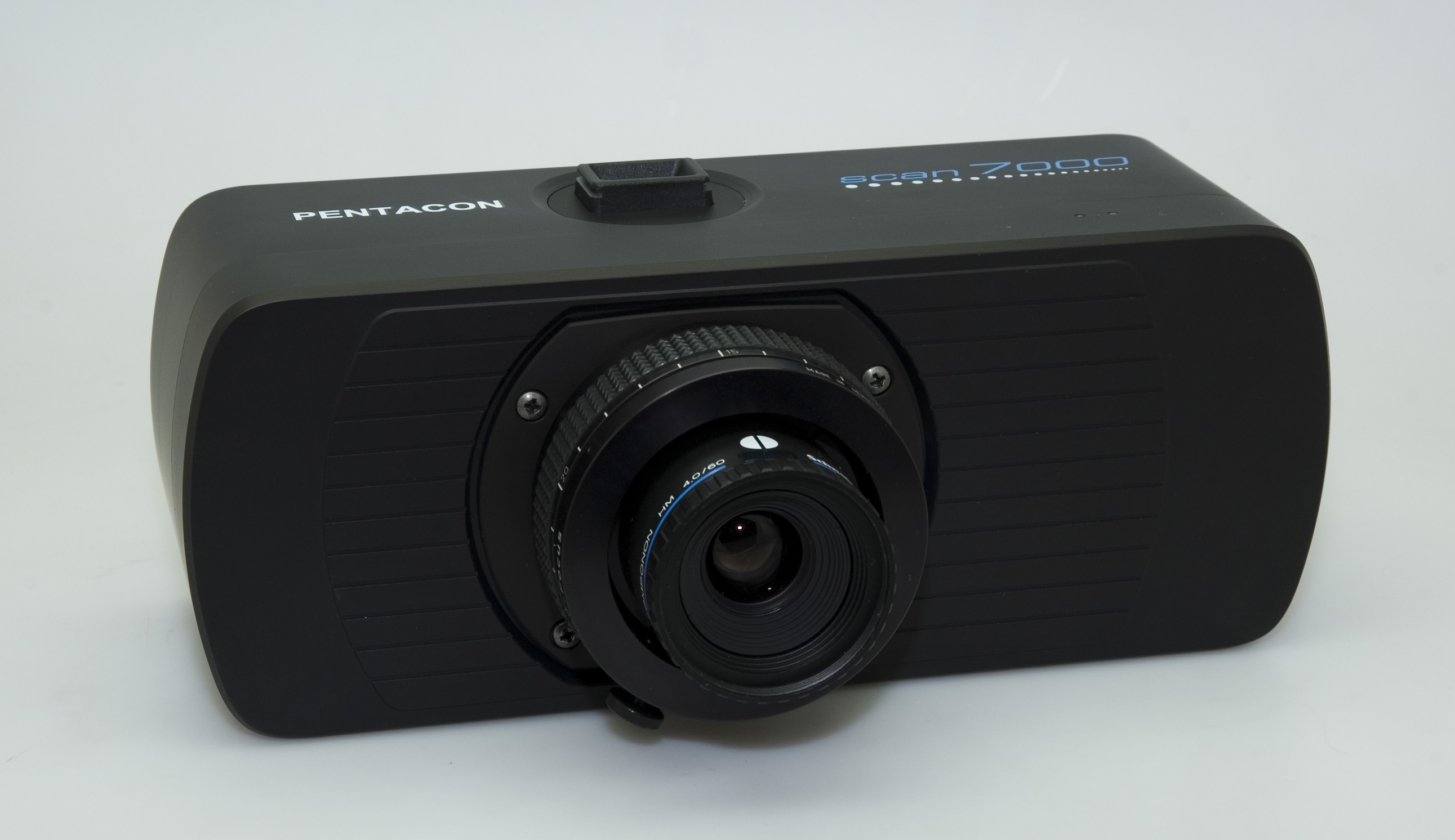
Pentacon Scan 7000

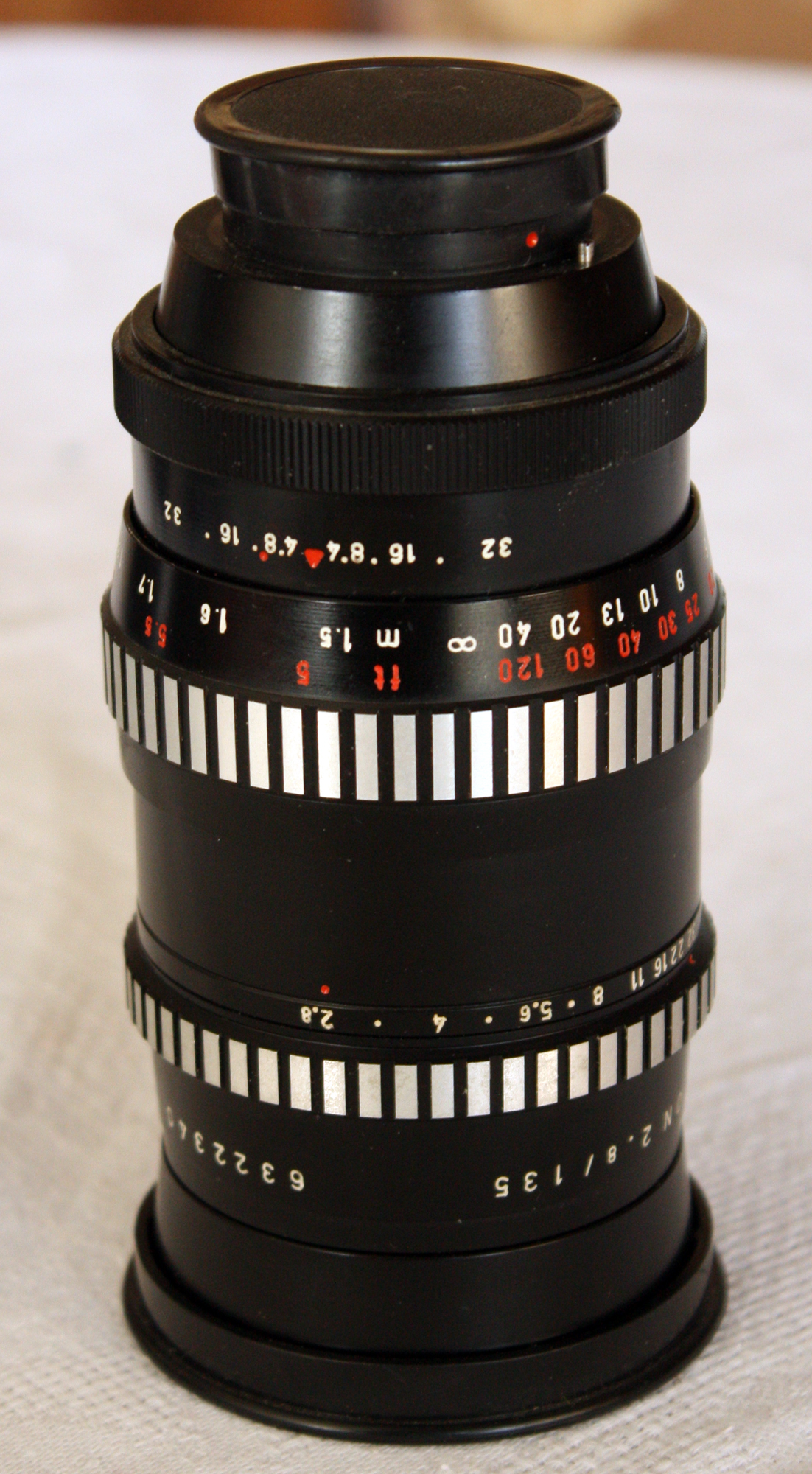
Pentacon 2.8/135 lens

Pentacon is the company name of a camera manufacturer in Dresden, Germany.

The name Pentacon is derived from the brand Contax of Zeiss Ikon Kamerawerke in Dresden and Pentagon, as a Pentaprism for Single-Lens Reflex (SLR) cameras was for the first time developed in Dresden. The cross section of this prism has a pentagonal shape. Pentacon is best known for producing the SLR cameras of the Praktica-series as well as the medium format camera Pentacon Six, the Pentacon Super and various cameras of the Exa series.

Pentacon also produced slide projectors.

== History ==
In 1959 several Dresden camera manufacturers, among them VEB Kamerawerke Freital, were joined to create Volkseigener Betrieb Kamera- und Kinowerke Dresden, which was renamed in 1964 to VEB Pentacon Dresden. In 1968, VEB Feinoptisches Werk Görlitz was integrated into VEB Pentacon. Accordingly, the former Meyer-Optik Görlitz lenses were now renamed to ”Pentacon“ .

After German reunification in 1990 Pentacon, as with most East German companies, came to be possessed by the Treuhandanstalt (the federal board concerned with the privatisation of East German companies) and was selected for closure instead of sale. It was deemed that company was grossly inefficient, employing six thousand staff when it could have sufficed with one thousand, and selling its cameras at a loss. Liquidation began on 2 October 1990 (one day before official reunification), and production ceased on 30 June 1991. By then it had shed nearly three thousand employees to retain a total of 3,331 - the next day all but 232 were laid off.

Investor Heinrich Manderman, who had previously been involved in resurrecting lensmaker Schneider Kreuznach, purchased the rights to the Pentacon brands and several portions of its assets, including the former military production building in Dresden. The company was re-established as Pentacon GmbH, a member of the Jos. Schneider group.

Production of cameras and lenses continues, but is now outsourced to South Korea.

Other parts of the former Pentacon company was sold to Noble and today belong to Kamera Werk Dresden, which, among other products, manufacture panoramic cameras under the Noblex brand, and cameras for industrial use under the Loglux brand.

Pentacon also produces scanner cameras. The latest model, the Scan 7000, was introduced at the photokina 2010 in Cologne, Germany. The Scan 7000 is operated with SilverFast and has a resolution of 20,000 × 20,000 pixels.
