= Breech-lock =

Photographic camera system

A breech-lock is a system for mounting camera lenses to camera bodies. The lens is attached to the camera by means of a rotating ring which is used to tighten the lens to the camera by friction.

Other methods for mounting a lens to a camera include bayonet mount or thread mounts. With breech-lock, the body of the lens does not rotate relative to the camera body, whereas with bayonet or screw mounts, the lens is rotated into place.

Breech-lock comes from the mechanisms that lock closed the breech of breech-loading firearms and artillery.

== See also ==
- Lens mount: for a list of camera lens mount systems, including several of the breech-lock type
