= Flange focal distance =

Property of a lens mount system

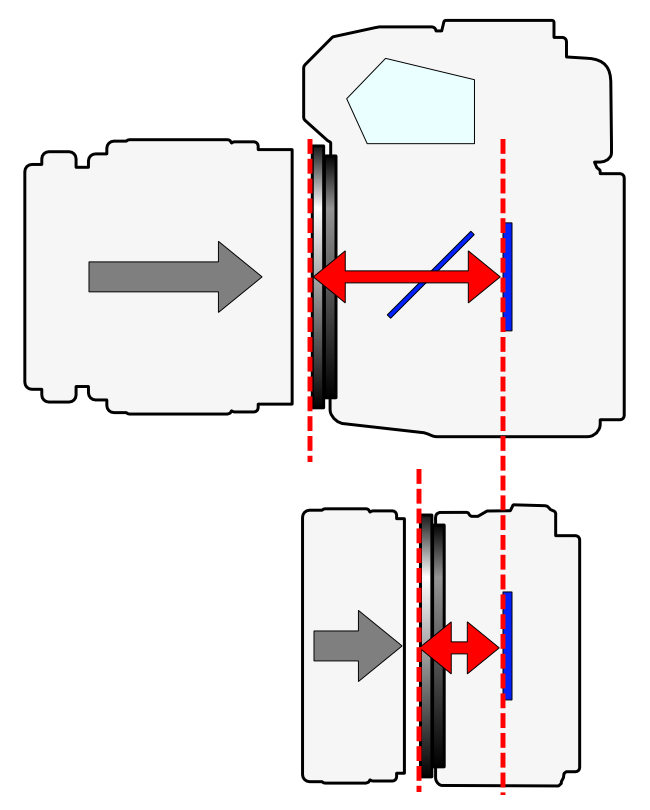
Diagram illustrating the flange focal length of an SLR–type and a mirrorless–type camera

For an interchangeable lens camera, the flange focal distance (FFD) (also known as the flange-to-film distance, flange focal depth, flange back distance (FBD), flange focal length (FFL), back focus or register, depending on the usage and source) of a lens mount system is the distance from the mounting flange (the interlocking metal rings on the camera and the rear of the lens) to the film or image sensor plane.

The flange focal distance is a fixed mechanical specification of a given camera system, and it must be manufactured to a precision of hundredths of a millimetre—even small deviations can prevent lenses from achieving accurate focus across all focal lengths. This value should not be confused with depth of field, which refers to the range of distances in front of the camera that appear acceptably sharp during image capture.

Lenses can be adapted from one mount (and respective FFD) to another using a lens adapter. FFD determines whether infinity focus can be accomplished with a simple non-optical adapter. Optics to correct for distance introduce more cost and can lower image quality, so non-optical lens adapters are preferred. A simple non-optical adapter holds the longer FFD lens the appropriate additional distance away from the sensor or film on the shorter FFD camera. A camera body with a shorter FFD can accept a larger number of lenses (those with a longer FFD) by using a simple adapter. A lens with a longer FFD can be more readily adapted to a larger number of camera bodies (those with a shorter FFD). If the difference is small, other factors such as the sizes and positions of the mounting flanges will influence whether a lens can be adapted without optics.

== Standard mounts ==
Typically, camera bodies with shorter flange focal distance can be adapted more readily to lenses with longer flange focal distance.

Mount	Flange focal distance	Type	Format	Production	Prime lenses	Zoom lenses	Wide/tele converters	Mount converters	Comments
Samsung NX mini	6.95 mm	Mirrorless	1" (8.80x13.20mm)	2014–2015	2	1		1	
Pentax Q-mount	9.2 mm	Mirrorless	1/2.3" (6.17×4.55 mm) / 1/1.7"	2011–2019	5	3	0	1	
M58×0.75 mm mount	12 mm	Industrial	24×36 mm						Industrial area and line scan cameras
D-mount	12.29 mm	cine	8 mm						(8 mm movie cameras)
CS-mount	12.526 mm	TV	1/4", 1/3", 1/2"						(surveillance cameras)
Nikon Z-mount	16 mm	Mirrorless	24×36 mm (FX)	2018–	25	17	2	1	Lens count doesn't include 3rd party products and optically identical "SE" versions.
Nikon Z-mount	16 mm	Mirrorless	APS-C (DX)	2019–	2	6		1	Lens count doesn't include 3rd party products and optically identical "SL" versions. Can use any of the 24x36 mm (FX) lenses and the FTZ/FTZ II mount adaptor.
DJI DL-mount	16.84 mm	Mirrorless	Super 35	2017–	6	1			For use on aerial drone and gimbal cameras.
Nikon 1-mount	17.00 mm	Mirrorless	CX	2011–2018	3	8		1	
C-mount	17.526 mm	cine / TV	8 mm, 16 mm, 1/3", 1/2", 2/3", 1", 4/3"	~1926–					(Bolex, Eclair and Bell & Howell)
Fujifilm X-mount	17.7 mm	Mirrorless	APS-C	2012–	23	14	2	1	
Canon EF-M-mount	18.00 mm	Mirrorless	APS-C	2012–	3	5	0	1	
Sony E-mount	18.00 mm	Mirrorless	APS-C	2010–	6	14	4	2	Lens count doesn't include 3rd party products. All FE lenses (see below) can also be used on APS-C E-mount cameras.
Sony E-mount	18.00 mm	Mirrorless	24×36 mm (FE)	2013–	22	17	4	3	Lens count doesn't include 3rd party products.
Sony FZ-mount	19.00 mm	cine	Super 35	2011–	0	2	0	3	
Sony FZ-mount	19.00 mm	cine	24×36 mm	2015–	1	2			
Micro Four Thirds System	19.25 mm	Mirrorless	4/3"	2008–	37	28	1	1	
Hasselblad XCD mount	18.14 mm (+0.05/-0.00)	Mirrorless	Medium Format (127) 43.8×32.9 mm	2017–	13	1		3	for Hasselblad X System
Canon RF mount	20.00 mm	Mirrorless	24×36 mm	2018–	25	22	2	3	Lens count does not include third-party lenses. All RF lenses can be used on Canon RF-S (APS-C) systems.
Canon RF mount	20.00 mm	Mirrorless	APS-C (RF-S)	2022–	2	5	2	3	Lens count does not include third-party lenses. RF-S lenses can be used on Canon full-frame RF systems, with the camera automatically cropping the image to APS-C size. The two RF-S dual fisheye prime lenses will mount on all RF-mount cameras, but most do not have the pixel density needed to produce the desired picture.
L-Mount (Leica, Panasonic Lumix, Sigma, DJI, et al.)	20.00 mm	Mirrorless	24×36 mm, APS-C	2014–	19	12			The members of the L-Mount Alliance are Leica Camera, Sigma, Panasonic, Ernst Leitz Wetzlar GmbH, DJI, Astrodesign, SIRUI, LK Samyang, Blackmagic Design, and Viltrox.
LUMIX Panasonic	20.00 mm	Mirrorless	24×36 mm, APS-C	2015–	8	9		7	L-mount system
JVC 1/3" bayonet mount	25.00 mm	TV	1/3" 3-CCD (5.24×2.94 mm)						
Samsung NX-mount	25.50 mm	Mirrorless	APS-C	2010–2015	8	8			
Fujifilm G-mount	26.7 mm	Mirrorless	Medium Format (127) 43.8×32.9 mm	2017–	7	2	1		for Fujifilm GFX series cameras
Pentax Auto 110	27.00 mm	SLR	13×17 mm	1978–1985	5	1	0	0	
Chaika	27.5mm	Mirrorless	18x24 mm	1967-1973	1	0	0	0	half-frame M39 variant
RED ONE interchangeable mount	27.30 mm	cine							
Leica M-mount	27.8 (inner rails) <-> 27.95 (outer rails) mm	Mirrorless	24×36 mm	1954–					aka Voigtländer VM-mount, Epson EM-mount, Zeiss ZM-mount as well as Konica KM-mount (Hexar RF) and Minolta M-mount (CL/CLE)
M39×26tpi mount	28.80 mm	Mirrorless	24×36 mm						Leica M39×26tpi aka LTM (Leica Thread Mount) aka L39 (not to be confused with M39×1)
M39×1/28.8 mount	28.80 mm	Mirrorless	24×36 mm	1948-1978					Zorki M39×1/28.8 for Zorki cameras (not to be confused with M39×1 and M39x26tpi)
Contax G-mount	29.00 mm	Mirrorless	24×36 mm	1994–2005	6	1	0	1	
Olympus PEN F (film)	28.95 mm	SLR	18×24 mm	1963–1972	16	2			
Hasselblad XPan	34.27 mm	Mirrorless	24×36 mm & 24×65 mm	1998–2003	3	0	0	0	Identical to Fujifilm TX series cameras and mount
Contax RF-mount	34.85 mm	Mirrorless	24×36 mm						
Nikon S-mount	34.85 mm	Mirrorless	24×36 mm	1947–2005					Rangefinder cameras
1/2" TV bayonet mount	35.74 mm	TV	1/2" 3-CCD						JVC, Hitachi, Panasonic, others, but not Sony
Minolta V-mount	36.00 mm	SLR	APS-H	1996–1999	3	5	0	1	Vectis S-1, Vectis S-100, Dimâge RD 3000
Sony 1/2" TV bayonet mount	38.00 mm	TV	1/2" 3-CCD						
Olympus Four Thirds System	38.67 mm	SLR	4/3"	2003–2017	12	30	2		
Nikonos	39.00 mm	underwater	24x36 mm	1963-2001	6	0	0	0	this is the underwater scale focusing camera
Aaton mount	40.00 mm	cine	16 mm/S16						
Panavision SP70-mount	38.00 mm	cine		2018–					35 mm & 65 mm
Konica F-mount	40.50 mm	SLR	24×36 mm	1960–1965	17	0	0	0	
Konica AR-mount	40.50 mm	SLR	24×36 mm	1965–1988	36	16	1	0	
Canon FL-mount	42.00 mm	SLR	24×36 mm	1964–1971					
Canon FD-mount	42.00 mm	SLR	24×36 mm	1971–1990	107	34			
Start (Soviet SLR)	42.00 mm	SLR		1958–1964					
Minolta SR-mount	43.50 mm	SLR	24×36 mm	1958–2001				6	
Fujica X-mount	43.50 mm	SLR	24×36 mm	1980–1985					
Pentaflex (16 mm cameras)	44.00 mm	cine							
Canon EF-mount	44.00 mm	SLR	24×36 mm / APS-H / APS-C	1987–	47	64			
Canon EF-S-mount	44.00 mm	SLR	APS-C	2003–	2	9	0	0	
Praktica B-mount	44.40 mm	SLR	24×36 mm	1978–1990					
Sigma SA-mount	44.00 mm	SLR	24×36 mm / APS-C	1992–	14	19	2	4	
M39x1	44.00 mm	Mirrorless	24×36 mm	1950s					Braun Paxette rangefinder cameras
Kiev Automat	44.00 mm	SLR	24x36 mm	1960s-1980s	6	1			
Arri LPL	44.00 mm	cine	25.54x36.70 mm	2018-					for Arri Alexa LF
Minolta/Konica Minolta/Sony A-mount	44.50 mm	SLR	24×36 mm	1985–	42+0+17	50+2+13	6+0+2	2+0+0	
Minolta/Konica Minolta/Sony A-mount	44.50 mm	SLR	APS-C	2004–	0+0+3	0+3+13	0+0+0	0+0+0	
Rollei QBM	44.50 mm	SLR	24×36 mm	1970–					Rollei, Voigtländer
Samsung Kenox mount	44.50 mm	SLR	24×36 mm	1997–2002	1	2 (3?)	0	0	Although designed in 1990s, mount is manual-focus only; lenses mount and lock on a slightly modified Minolta A-mount adapters
Exakta	44.7 mm	SLR	24×36 mm	1936–1969					
M39x1	45.20 mm	SLR	24×36 mm	1952–1968					Early Russian SLRs (Zenit) (not to be confused with M39×26tpi and M39×1/28,8)
M37×1	45.46 mm	SLR	24×36 mm	1952-1957					Asahiflex I, Asahiflex IA (Tower 23), Asahiflex IIB (Tower 23/24), Asahiflex IIA (Tower 22)
M42×1	45.46 mm	SLR	24×36 mm	1949–					Pentacon, Pentax, Contax S, Praktica, Zeiss ZS, Zenit, many others (not to be confused with T-mount, which is M42×0.75)
Pentax K-mount	45.46 mm	SLR / Mirrorless	24×36 mm / APS-C	1975–	147	108	8	3	Used also by some Samsung, Ricoh, Chinon, Agfa, Vivitar, Petri and KMZ (Zenit) cameras. Lens count only for Pentax-branded lenses.
Contax C/Y-mount	45.50 mm	SLR	24×36 mm	1974–2005	24	5	3		Used by some Contax and Yashica SLR cameras
Petri Bayonet	43.50 mm	SLR	24×36 mm						Petri SLRs 1960-77.
Mamiya Z	45.50 mm	SLR	24×36 mm	1980–					
Kodak Retina DKL-mount	45.7 mm	SLR / Mirrorless	24×36 mm / 28×28 mm	1958–1977	12+6	0	0	0	DKL variants used by Retina Reflex S (034), Retina Reflex III (041), Retina Reflex IV (051, 051/N), Instamatic Reflex (062), Retina IIIS
Voigtländer Bessamatic DKL-mount	45.7 mm	SLR	24×36 mm	1958–1967	11+2	1	0	0	DKL variants used by Bessamatic, Bessamatic deLuxe, Bessamatic m, Bessamatic CS, Ultramatic, Ultramatic CS
Braun Paxette Reflex DKL-mount	45.7 mm	SLR / Mirrorless	24×36 mm						DKL variant used by Paxette Reflex Automatic, Paxette Reflex Automatic II, Tower 33 Reflex, Tower 34 Reflex; Balda Baldamatic III; Witt Iloca Electric / Graflex Graphic 35 Electric; Wirgin Edixa Electronica / Revue Edixa Electronica
Voigtländer Vitessa T DKL-mount	45.7 mm	Mirrorless	24×36 mm		4+?	0	0	0	DKL variant used by Voigtländer Vitessa T; Braun Colorette (Super) II, Colorette (Super) IIB, Colorette (Super) IIL, Colorette (Super) IIBL; Wittnauer Continental, Wittnauer Professional
Yashica MA-mount	45.80 mm	SLR	24×36 mm					1	(measured); 230AF etc.
Olympus OM-mount	46.00 mm	SLR	24×36 mm	1972–2002	38	14			
Nikon F-mount	46.50 mm	SLR	24×36 mm / APS-C	1959–	213	117			Used by some Kiev F-mount cameras. Only Nikon manufactured lenses counted. Nikon claims that there are over 400 Nikkor lens models manufactured.
Leica R-mount	47.00 mm	SLR	24×36 mm	1964–2009					
KMZ Zenit DKL-mount	47.58 mm	SLR	24×36 mm	1964–1968	5	1	0	0	Zenit/Зенит 4/5/6 "Байонет Ц", an unofficial DKL-mount variant
B4-mount	48.00 mm	TV	2/3" 3-CCD (9.6×5.4 mm)	1992–					Mount was in use since at least 1978, wasn't officially standardized until 1992.
Contax N	48.00 mm	SLR	24×36 mm	2000–2005	4	5	0	1	
Tamron Adaptall/Adaptall-2	50.7 mm	SLR	24×36 mm	1973-2006	14	29	3	26	No camera uses Adaptall lenses natively, intended to be used with mount adapters. Many lenses have revisions, only original optical formulas are counted.
Arri Standard	52.00 mm	cine							
Arri B	52.00 mm	cine							
Arri PL	52.00 mm	cine							
Leica S-mount	53.00 mm	SLR	45×30 mm	1996–					
Mini T-mount	55.00 mm	SLR	24×36 mm	1957–1962					Taisei, M37×0.75
T-mount	55.00 mm	SLR	24×36 mm	1962–					Tamron T-400, M42×0.75 (not to be confused with M42×1)
YS mount	55.00 mm	SLR	24×36 mm	–1969					Sigma, Upsilon, Accura, Polaris, Sun, Aetna, Beroflex, Petri, Raynox, N.P.S., Formula, Dionar, Universal, Soligor, Yashica, Spiratone. M42×0.75 (not to be confused with M42×1) Same as T-mount but with aperture coupling
Mamiya 6	56.20 mm	Mirrorless	6×6 cm	1989–1995	3	0	0	0	Rangefinder camera system, flange focal distance might not be precise.
Panavision PV-mount	57.15 mm	cine		1972–					35 mm & 16 mm
Mamiya 7	59.00 mm	Mirrorless	6×7 cm	1995–2014	6	0	0	0	Rangefinder camera system
OCT-19	61.00 mm	cine							
Hasselblad H-mount	61.63 mm	SLR	6×4.5 cm	2002–					for Hasselblad H System
Mamiya 645	63.30 mm	SLR	6×4.5 cm	1975–					
Novoflex A-mount	63.3 mm	SLR							(measured) "A"-type adapters for follow-focus system
Contax 645	64.00 mm	SLR	6×4.5 cm	1999–					
Zenza Bronica ETR	69.00 mm	SLR	6×4.5 cm	1976–2004	17	2			
Pentax 645	70.87 mm	SLR	6×4.5 cm	1984–	25	8	2	2	
Rollei SLX	74.00 mm	SLR	6×6 cm	1976–2005					
Pentacon Six	74.1 mm	SLR	6×6 cm	1956–1992					Used also by Exakta 66 and Kiev 60 series cameras
Hasselblad V-mount	74.90 mm	SLR	6×6 cm	1957–2013					for Hasselblad V system
Kowa Six/Super 66	79.00 mm	SLR	6×6 cm	1968–1974	9	0			
Hasselblad 1000F & 1600F	82.10 mm	SLR	6×6 cm	1948–1957					
Salyut/Kiev mount	82.10 mm	SLR	6×6 cm	1972–1980					Used by Salyut-S/Салют-C, Zenit/Zenith-80, Kiev 88 cameras
Pentax 6×7	84.95 mm or 85.00 mm	SLR	6×7 cm	1969–1999	25	2	3		
Zenza Bronica SQ	85.00 mm	SLR	6×6 cm	1980–2003	14				
Zenza Bronica GS	85.00 mm	SLR	6×7 cm	1983–2002	9	0	2		
Zenza Bronica S2A	101.70 mm	SLR	6×6 cm	1959–1980					
Rollei SL66	102.80 mm	SLR	6×6 cm	1966–1992					
Mamiya RZ	105.00 mm	SLR	6×7 cm	1982–					
Mamiya RB	112.00 mm	SLR	6×7 cm	1970–					
Ricoh 126C-Flex	62.22 mm	SLR	24×24 mm	1968-1969					
16-SP	52 mm	Cine	16 mm	1965-1991					Used on the Soviet Kinor 16 and Krasnogorsk cameras
Kiev-16U	31 mm	Cine	16 mm		3				Used on the Soviet Kiev-16U camera
1KSR-1M	57 mm	Cine	35 mm						Used on the Soviet Konvas-1M, 7M, Automat cameras
1KSR-2M	61 mm	Cine	35 mm						Used on the Soviet Konvas-2M, 8M, Kinor-35 cameras
Vivitar TX	56.25 mm	SLR	24×36mm	1976-	10			10	Generic mount used to be attached on many cameras thanks to differents adapters

== Precision ==
Flange focal distance is one of the most important variables in a system camera, as lens seating errors of as little as 0.01 mm will manifest themselves critically on the imaging plane and focus will not match the lens marks. Professional movie cameras are rigorously tested by rental houses regularly to ensure the distance is properly calibrated. Any discrepancies between eye focus and measured focus that manifest themselves across a range of distances within a single lens may be collimation error with the lens, but if such discrepancies occur across several lenses, it is more likely to be the flange focal distance or the ground glass (or both) that are misset.

=== Film use ===
Due to research on optimal flange focal distance settings, it is currently considered better for flange focal distance to be set to somewhere within the film's emulsion layer, rather than on the surface of it. Therefore, the nominal flange focal depth will be equivalent to the distance to the ground glass, whereas the actual flange focal depth to the aperture plate will in fact be ~0.02 mm less.

== See also ==
- List of lens mounts
- Lens adapter
