= M42 lens mount =

Screw thread mounting standard for attaching lenses to 35 mm cameras

M42
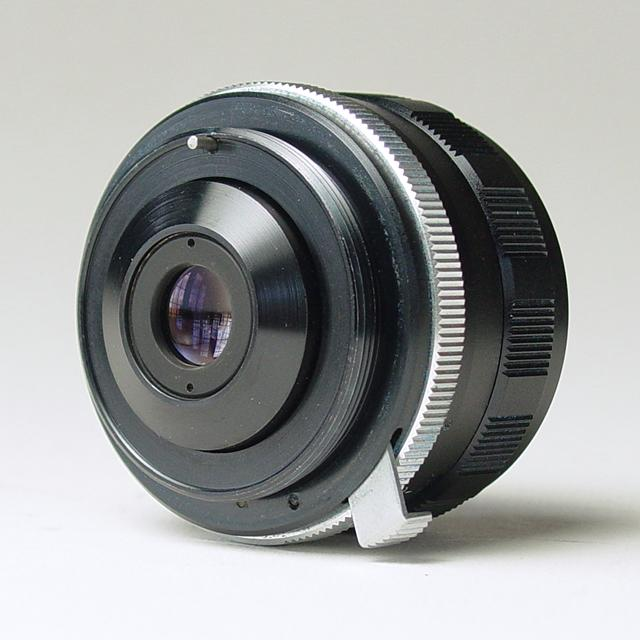
- Auto-Takumar 1:3.5 35mm
- Type: Screw
- External diameter: 42mm
- Inner diameter: 41mm
- Tabs: none
- Flange: 45.5 mm
- Connectors: Auto aperture

The M42 lens mount is a screw thread mounting standard for attaching lenses to 35 mm cameras, primarily single-lens reflex models. It is more accurately known as the M42 × 1 mm standard, which means that it is a metric screw thread of 42 mm diameter and 1 mm thread pitch. The M42 lens mount should not be confused with the T-mount, which shares the 42 mm throat diameter, but differs by having a 0.75 mm thread pitch.

It was first used by the East German brands VEB Zeiss Ikon in the Contax S of 1949, and KW in the Praktica of the same year. VEB Zeiss Ikon and KW were merged into the Pentacon brand in 1959, along with several other East German camera makers.

M42 thread mount cameras first became well known under the Praktica brand, and thus the M42 mount is known as the Praktica thread mount. Since there were no proprietary elements to the M42 mount, many other manufacturers used it, leading to it being called the Universal thread mount or Universal screw mount by many. The M42 mount was also used by Pentax; thus, it is also commonly known as the Pentax thread mount, although Pentax did not originate it.

== Evolution and automation ==
The M42 mount was first developed by Carl Zeiss at their Jena plant in 1938 at the request of the KW camera company for their Praktica line, which had previously used M40 (40 mm by 1 mm DIN).

The first lenses were plain stop-down design, but many manufacturers extended the M42 lens mount to provide extra features. The first innovation was the pre-select type, which allowed an aperture value to be pre-selected without actually closing the aperture, with a separate ring to close down the aperture quickly to the chosen value. This gave the user the benefit of comfortable framing and focusing with a bright viewfinder and clear focus separation, and then closing the aperture without the need to remove the eye from the eyepiece. A further development followed with "auto" lenses, which have a pin in the mount which closes the aperture against a spring to the chosen setting when it is pushed. This was adopted as a common standard by virtually all lens manufacturers. Cameras designed for these lenses have a bar in the bottom of the mount which depresses the pin when the shutter is released. The first cameras, such as the Praktica Nova range, used physical finger pressure on the shutter button to operate the bar and close the aperture, allowing a stopped-down preview of the depth of field before the shutter fired. However, this function was removed in later Praktica models because some users found it was possible, with longer exposure times, to release the shutter button and open the aperture before the shutter had closed. The bar on Pentax Spotmatic cameras is operated by spring pressure with timing linked to the shutter, but these cameras also had a separate switch for the light meter circuit which closed the aperture and gave the depth of field preview in this way. To allow auto lenses to be used on earlier cameras without the bar, many lenses were provided with a switch or button to put the lens into stop-down mode, commonly referred to as the Auto-Manual or A/M switch.

The last development of M42 lenses was the introduction of a link between camera and lens to transmit the lens aperture setting, which allowed light metering with the aperture remaining wide open. The means of doing this was not standardised, Praktica's method was to use an electrical connection which transmitted a variable resistance value to the camera's metering circuit. Asahi Pentax developed an additional lever on the lens that operated a variable resistor in the camera mount. These mechanisms spurred the use of electronic shutters linked to the metering circuit, allowing for automated shutter speed selection by the camera (aperture priority). M42 cameras with wide open metering facility include:

- Praktica PLC2, PLC3, EE 2 and EE 3 (1975, 1977, 1979) using Pentacon Electric lenses
- Fujica ST705, ST801, ST901
- Olympus FTL (1970)
- Pentax Spotmatic F, Electro Spotmatic (Japan only), ES and ESII (1975, 1971-3)
- Yashica Electro AX (1972)
- Zenit 18 (with Zenitar ME1 lens only)
- GAF L-ES
- Hanimex Praktica Nova 1B
- Mamiya/Sekor 1000 DTL

or automated selection of aperture (shutter priority) for

- Ricoh TLS-EE (1973)
- Petri-designed Exakta FE 2000 (1978)
- Sears TLS (made by Ricoh)

Forward and backward compatibility was maintained in most cases so that the newer lenses could be used on older cameras, and old standard lenses could be used on the newer cameras, but of course without the advanced automation. However, Olympus FTL lenses and Fujica screw mount lenses had a projecting cam, which means that they cannot be fully screwed down on a regular screw mount body.

Chinon used a different system to provide aperture priority mode with standard Auto-M42 lenses with the CE Memotron (1974), CE-II Memotron and CE-3 Memotron bodies. A similar system was used in the Cosina Hi-Lite EC. These cameras retained the facility of closing the aperture with finger pressure on the release button so that the image could be framed and focused normally with the lens wide open. As the shutter button was depressed the lens would firstly be stopped down to the selected aperture, then the meter would be switched on and a reading taken. Chinon used a then-modern silicon (Si) metering cell with fast reaction time compared to the then-standard cadmium sulfide (CdS) cells, which made it possible to close the aperture, meter the light and set the shutter speed automatically in one full press of the button. While this method did not offer the same sensitivity advantage of true open-aperture metering, it was much more versatile, as it did not require specially-equipped proprietary lenses. Both Cosina and Chinon sold their cameras to various other companies for rebranding, which increased the number of almost-identical cameras considerably.

Compatibility problems have been experienced when mounting lenses with aperture transmission levers, such as SMC Takumars, on older bodies, such as Zenit-E or Mamiya DTL. The aperture lug or a pin can interlock with the slotted screw heads affixing the mount, which then impedes lens removal. One method to remove the lens from the mount is to use a feeler gauge between the lens and the mount, which should depress the pin and therefore allow the lens to be removed. To prevent the lens from becoming stuck, one or more of the screws on the camera lens mount should be either loosened or tightened to such a position that the slot in the screw is aligned with the mount. This will allow for the aperture pin to pass inside the screw slot, and not fall into it, becoming stuck.

M42 mount cameras fell out of general production during the late 1970s and early 1980s, with the exception of the Russian Zenit range. Pentax moved to the Pentax K-mount from 1975 onwards, while Praktica adopted the electronic B-Mount in 1979. It was briefly revived with the Cosina-made Voigtländer Bessaflex TM launched in 2003, but this was discontinued in 2007. M42 lenses are still in production at KMZ and at Cosina (under the Voigtländer brand and the ZS line for Carl Zeiss).

== Notable cameras produced for the M42 mount ==
- Zenit line of SLRs from the USSR and Russia (some models)
- Praktica SLRs from East Germany (not the B-Series)
- Pentax SLRs from Japan (some models, all before the Pentax K2 of 1975)
- Zeiss Ikon Icarex 35/35S TM and SL-706
- Voigtländer Bessaflex TM (2003–2007)

== Use on modern cameras ==
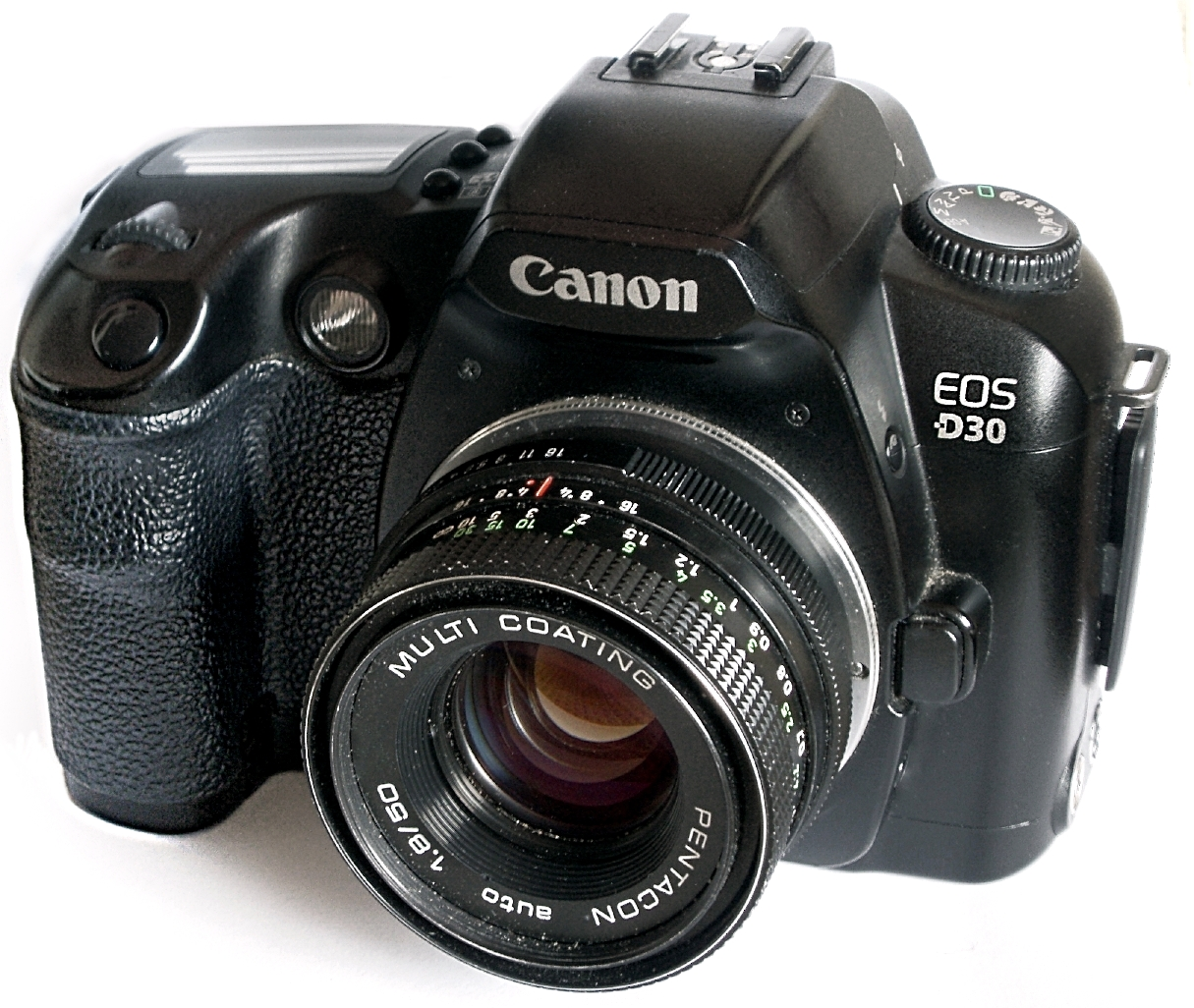
M42 adapters exist for many current lens mounts; here, a Pentacon 50mm M42 lens is mounted to a Canon EOS body.

Due to the simplicity of the M42 lens mount and the large selection of lenses, M42 adapters exist for all current and many obsolete lens mounts. The adapter fits between the camera and the lens, making it possible to mate an M42 lens to a body with a different lens mount. M42 adapters work best on bodies with a flange depth less than or equal to the M42's flange depth, which includes the popular Canon EF-mount, the Pentax K-mount, the Minolta/Konica Minolta/Sony A-mount, the Sony E-mount, the Samsung NX-mount, the Fujifilm X-mount, the Nikon Z-mount, and the Four Thirds system including the Micro Four Thirds system. This allows the lens to be physically mounted the correct distance from the film or sensor, retaining the original focus range of the lens without the use of correction optics.

Some M42 lenses extend too far into the camera body, causing interference between the mirror mechanism of the camera, and rear element or aperture pin of the lens. This issue is most commonly encountered with certain Takumar lenses adapted to Canon full frame cameras.

On bodies with a flange focal distance greater than that of M42, most notably Nikon F, three options are available. A simple mechanical adapter allows the lens to be mounted, but the effect is similar to the introduction of an extension tube, reducing the minimum focus distance at the expense of losing infinity focus. Alternatively, an adapter with an optical element can be used to retain the original focus range of the lens, at the expense of some image quality. Finally, it is possible to replace the M42 mount on some lenses with the desired camera mount, or to perform the reverse change on a camera body.

The level of functionality available from a modern body when an M42 lens is mounted may vary. Some bodies may be operated in aperture priority mode, others will only allow full manual control in this circumstance. Focus confirmation may not be available. Mounting an M42 lens on a digital SLR with a sensor smaller than 35 mm film results in FOV crop.

=== Compatibility ===
- Canon — All DSLRs need full manual control. With certain adapters, metering and focus confirmation is available.
- Nikon F — All DSLRs need full manual control. Focus confirmation is available, focus to infinity is only possible with adapter with additional lens.
- Nikon Z — All MILCs need full manual control. Focus confirmation is available.
- Four Thirds — All DSLRs need full manual control. Image stabilisation works. With certain adapters, metering and focus confirmation is available.
- Pentax — All DSLRs allow aperture-priority with focus confirmation and infinity focus. Image stabilisation works. With grounding one contact on the camera with foil, focus-trap is also available (on Models which have it).
- Minolta/Sony A-mount — All DSLRs need full manual control. Metering works and lens can focus on infinity. With chipped adapters focus confirmation and image stabilisation are also available. Some SLTs are reported to work fine in aperture-priority mode (A65 confirmed).
- Sigma — SD9 allows auto exposure with aperture-priority mode, infinity focus and focus confirmation. User needs to calibrate camera for each change of aperture on the lens by changing aperture value on the camera.

Lens mount	FFD	Infinity focus	Focus confirmation	Metering	Image stabilization
Canon EF	44.00 mm	yes	adapter	Stop-down Metering	no
Canon EF-M	18.00 mm	yes	manual	Stop-down Metering	no
Canon RF	22.00 mm	yes	manual	Stop-down Metering	depends on specific camera (IBIS)
Nikon F	46.50 mm	optical adapter	yes	no/yes (depending on the model and mode settings)	no
Nikon Z	16 mm	yes	yes	no/yes (depending on the model and mode settings)	depends on specific camera
Olympus Four Thirds	38.58 mm	yes	adapter	yes	yes
Pentax	45.46 mm	yes	yes	yes	yes
Minolta/Sony A-mount	44.50 mm	yes	adapter	yes	adapter
M42	45.46 mm				

== Specifications ==
- Thread: M42 × 1
- Flange focal distance: 45.5 mm (The figure 45.46 mm is also commonly seen, particularly in Pentax literature.)
