= FTL =

FTL may stand for:

== Science and technology ==
- Faster-than-light communication and travel
- Ferritin light chain, encoded by the FTL gene
- Flash Translation Layer
- Foot-lambert ft-L, a measure of luminance
- Olympus FTL, a camera
- FreeMarker template language

== Games ==
- Faster Than Light (software publisher), a British video game publisher
- FTL: Faster Than Light, a video game
- FTL Games, an American video game developer

== Other uses ==
- Fort Lauderdale, Florida, United States
  - Fort Lauderdale station, Amtrak code FTL
- Freedom to Learn, in Michigan, United States
- Fruit of the Loom, an American clothing manufacturer
- Full truck load
