= One-to-One Institute =

One-to-One Institute is a national, non-profit organization that grew out of the Michigan Freedom to Learn (FTL) program. One-to-One Institute helps states and school districts improve student achievement and engagement through one-to-one learning programs.

In October 2005, the Michigan Legislature authorized the FTL program to create an independent institute that could seek public and private funds to promote one-to-one learning across North America. Hewlett-Packard Company is the Institute's founding, platinum sponsor to help expand one-to-one learning to more schools. An announcement about the Institute and fall launch was made at the Florida Educational Technology Conference on March 23, 2006
