= D mount =

Type of lens mount

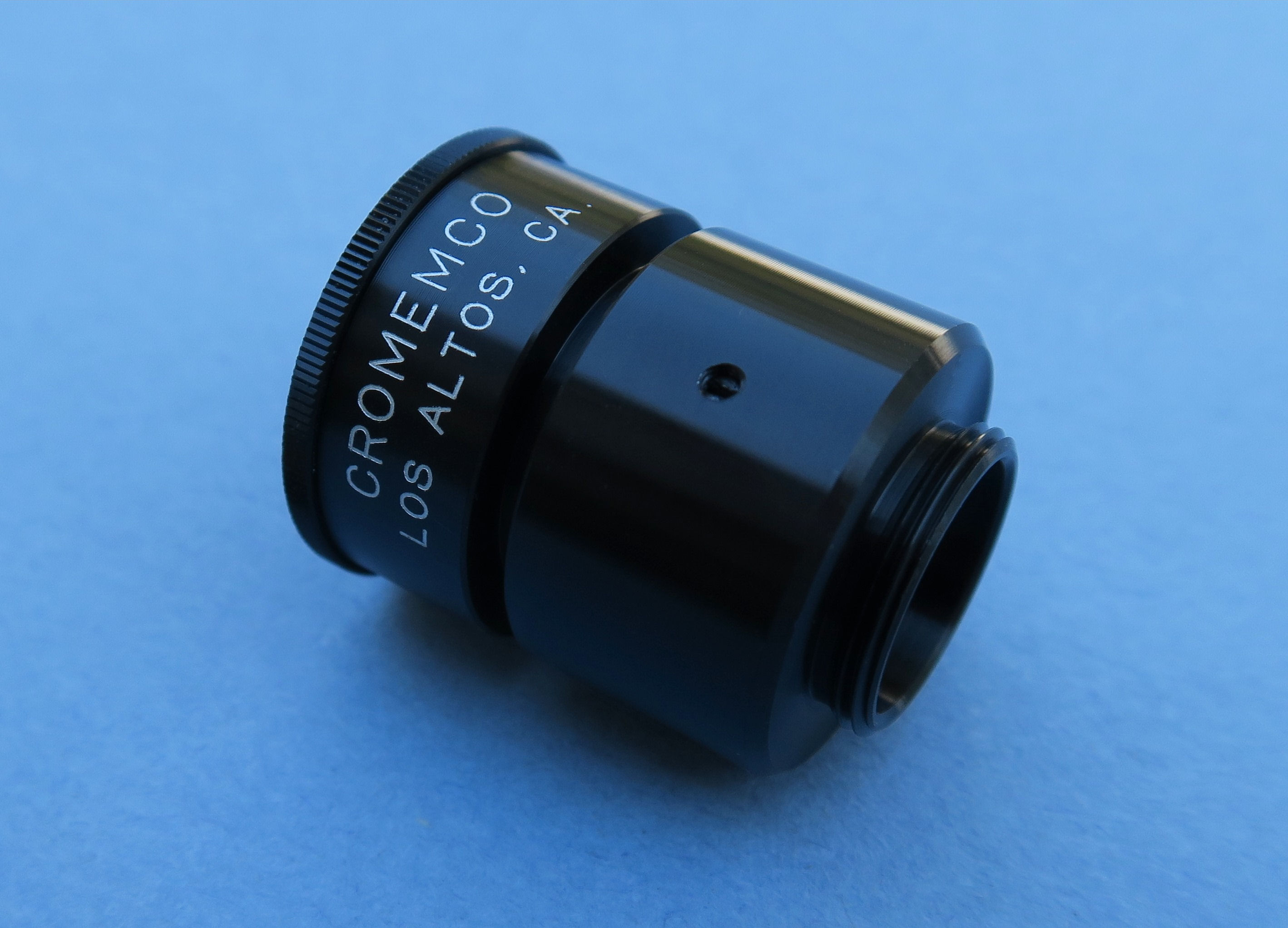
D-Mount Camera Lens used on the Cromemco Cyclops digital camera

A D-mount is a type of lens mount commonly found on 8mm movie cameras.

- Throat or thread diameter 15.88 mm (0.625 inch)
- Mount thread pitch 32 TPI
- Flange focal distance 12.29 mm

D-Mount lenses have found new uses in the Nikon 1 series, Fujifilm X series, Pentax Q series and other modern mirrorless cameras via adapters.

== See also ==
- T-mount
- Lens mount
- Pentax K mount
- C-mount
- PL-mount
