= BNCR mount =

BNCR is a lens mount developed by Mitchell for use with its reflex 35 mm movie cameras. It was an update of the BNC mount (short back-focus; Bausch & Lomb Baltars and equivalents) done to accommodate the reflex viewer in the later cameras. BNC mount lenses cannot be used in reflex Mitchell cameras as their shorter back-focus will hit and damage the reflex viewer, which, in various versions, was a pellicle (partially silvered) mirror or a (100% silvered, first surface) rotating mirror. The initials stand for Blimped Newsreel Camera Reflex, which meant that it is a 35 mm camera originally intended for news reporting but included a blimp housing for sound stage shooting plus a reflex viewer to allow the camera operator to view the action through the lens while filming. The reflex option was only added in 1967, while the blimp option - thereby converting an NC (Newsreel Camera) into a BNC, (Blimped Newsreel Camera) - was available at the camera's introduction in 1934, but only a few BNC examples were made before the onset of WW-II, during which manufacture of "production" cameras was suspended.

The lens mount is not identical across all variants, which means that there is a marked difference between a BNC and BNCR mount, for instance. BNCR is only the current convention, as it was the last version of the camera and in relatively current use until the 1990s. The mount contains four pronged flanges, with only one of which contains a notch towards the center. This notch is used to align the mount to a locating pin located approximately 45 degrees clockwise from the top of the camera's lens mount. This radial indexing is of particular importance when shooting an anamorphic format (CinemaScope or Panavision, or equivalent). The mount is locked into place using a friction locking ring, which, in conjunction with the four prongs of the flange, creates a very strong lens seating. The quality of this design has been a key influence in the design of the Arri PL and Panavision PV mounts, both of which are the main film camera mounts in use today, and both of which have four-pronged flanges oriented based on locating pin-notch combinations. The Arri PL mount, in particular, is very similar in appearance to the BNCR mount, the only immediately apparent difference being the ability to seat any of the four notched prongs against the locating pin; the flange focal distance and diameter also differ.

With the slow obsolescence of the Mitchell cameras, which likely took so long because they were so well regarded in mechanical design aspects, such as their steady intermittent movement registration ("Compensating Link" movement) and strong mounts, the mounts have gradually become less common in the past two decades, but remained an option for third party cameras produced as recently as the 1980s. Many of the cameras are still in usage in fields such as animation. Though the mount is not quite as common today, it is still very well regarded in the field.

== Technical specifications ==
- Flange focal distance: 61.468 mm
- Diameter: 68.00 mm
- Cameras:
  - 35 mm Mitchell NC, Mitchell NCR, Mitchell BNC, Mitchell BNCR, Mitchell S35R, Arri 35BL3, Cinema Products XR35, Cinema Products CP35, Fries 435, IMAGE 300, Moviecam SuperAmerica, Moviecam Compact, PhotoSonics 4ER, PhotoSonics 4ML, Ultracam
  - 65 mm Mitchell FC, Mitchell FCR, Mitchell BFC, Mitchell BFCR
