= T-mount =

Mechanical lens mount for cameras and telescopes

- Type: screw
- External diameter: 42 mm
- Flange: 55 mm
- Connectors: None

The T-mount is a standard lens mount for cameras and other optical assemblies. The usual T-mount is a screw mount using a male 42×0.75 (42 mm diameter, 0.75 mm thread pitch) metric thread on the lens with a flange focal distance of 55 mm and a mating female 42mm thread on a camera adapter or other optical component. This thread form is referred to as T-thread. (This should not be confused with the M42 lens mount which is also 42 mm diameter, but has a 1 mm thread pitch. The T-thread is sometimes described as "M42×0.75," which is the usual manner in which to describe a metric thread.)

The "T" is said to stand for Tamron or Taisei, a Japanese manufacturer that released in 1957 the first of a line of aftermarket camera lenses that fit 35 mm SLR cameras built by various manufacturers using their universal T-mount. On the first model, the mini T-mount used a M37×0.75 thread; Tamron's canonical M42×0.75 T-thread didn't appear on the market until about 1962. The company referred to it variously as a T-mount, T-thread, T-adapter, or a T-400, but not as a T-2, which is simply the name that Soligor used for its version of the T-adapter. The proprietary lens mount of each camera manufacturer was adapted to the T-mount thread with a simple adapter. Thus a retailer could stock a small number of expensive lenses that would fit a large number of camera brands using a selection of inexpensive adapters.

Some T-mount lenses accept a T-adapter that lacks its threaded inner ring, and simply slides onto the T-mount lens. It is secured only by 3 set screws that match a channel on the lens barrel, such that the barrel is not deformed by the set screws and the adapter can therefore be removed with no damage.

As a common mechanical interface, the T-mount allows components of various manufacturers to be interchanged and assembled. The T-mount is a solely mechanical specification. Electrical or mechanical connections (such as for autofocus) are generally not provided, although Sigma's YS Mount featured an automatic diaphragm coupling.

Besides cameras, T-mounts are used in optical breadboard prototyping components as well as telescope and microscope attachments. The T-mount is also a standard way to mount a camera to a microscope to photograph pathological specimen slides or to a 1.25-inch (32 mm) telescope eyepiece.

== Adapters ==
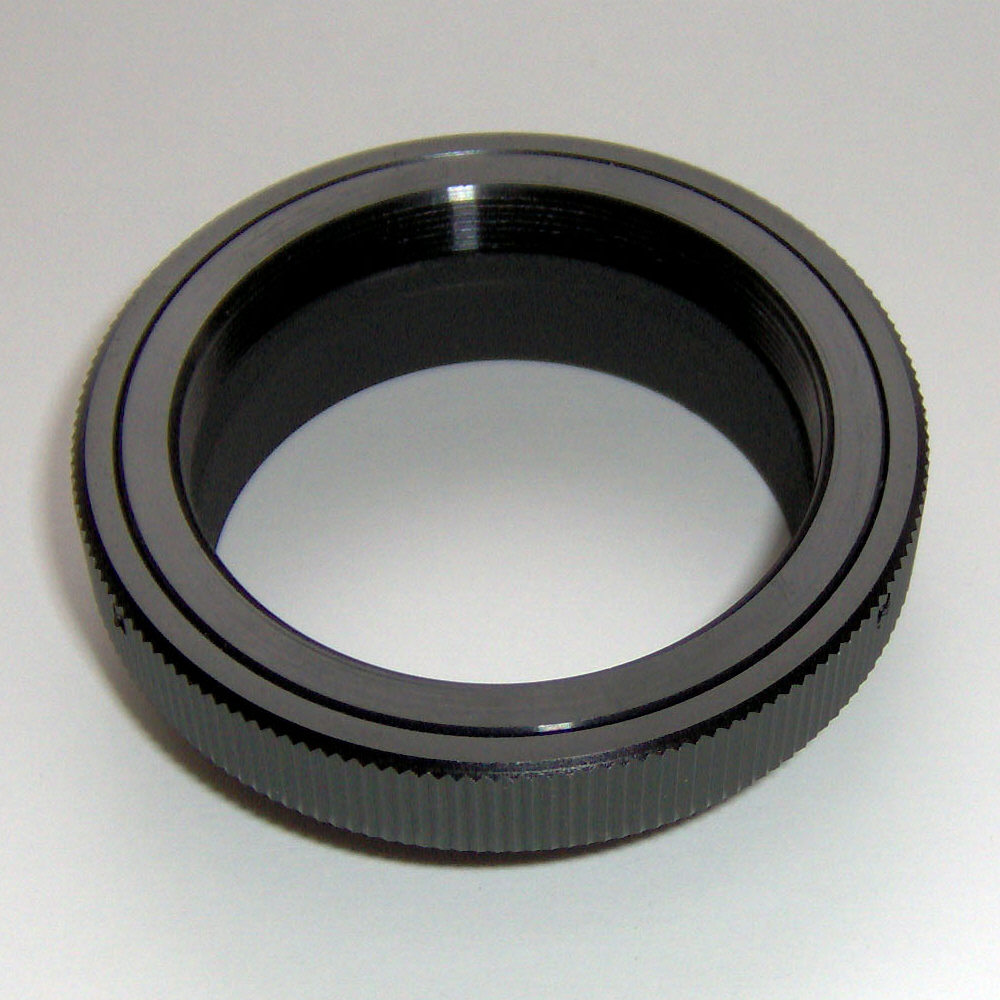
T-mount to M42 mount adapter ring

Because the T-mount lenses have a long flange distance of 55 mm and most 35 mm cameras have shorter flange distances, a simple mechanical adapter called T-Ring is needed to adapt a T-mount lens to any camera body without optical correction to achieve its closest focus distance. An adapter ring has a female M42×0.75 metric thread on one side and a corresponding lens mount of the camera body on the other side. A T-adapter consists of an inner ring with T-mount thread and an external ring with corresponding lens mount. The T-ring and the T-2 ring are identical to each other. Both of them have the inner and outer ring. The two rings (inner and outer) are held together by 3 peripheral screws on the external ring. Loosening these screws allows rotation between the lens and the camera body. This is especially useful when the camera body is attached to telescopes or microscopes.

Standard T-rings usually have the same external diameter of their inner ring because some T-mount lenses have their inner ring built onto the flange, thus the external ring of the T-adapter can be directly attached, as described above.

Since some DSLRs won't meter without electronic lens data, some adapters are now sold fitted with a Dandelion chip which can be programmed to identify the focal length and aperture limits and enable metering and in some cases focal confirmation.

The thickness of the external ring on an adapter is equal to the difference of the flange distance between the T-mount and the corresponding lens mount in order to achieve infinity focus. Other large format camera lenses have a flange distance longer than 55 mm. They can be attached to smaller format cameras with a combination of corresponding lens-to-T-mount-adapter and a T-Ring.

== See also ==
- Tamron
- M42 lens mount
- C mount
- K mount
- ISO metric screw thread
