= Lens mount =

Interface between a camera body and lens

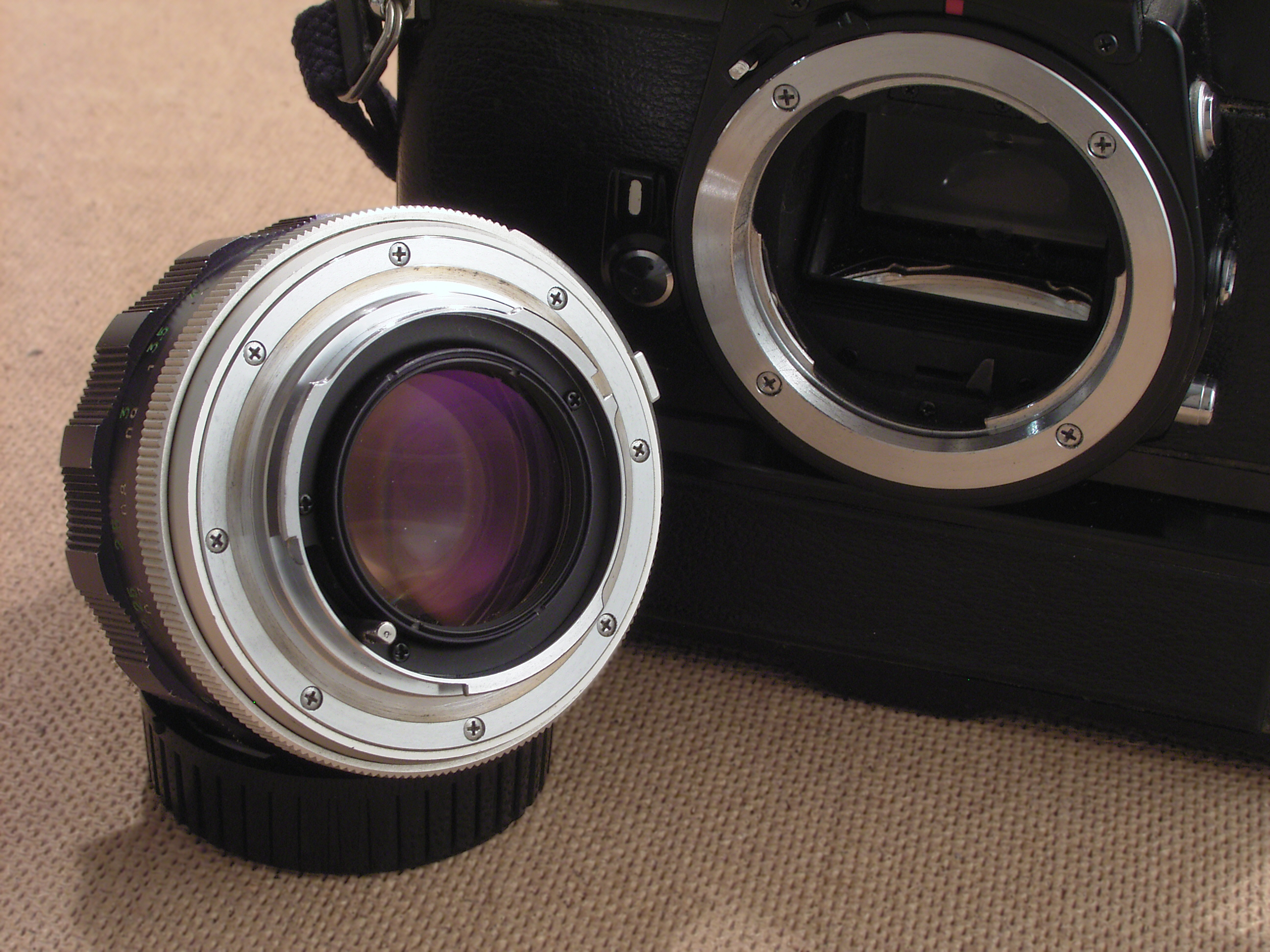
Male mount of Minolta MC-Rokkor 58mm 1:1.4 lens with female lens mount of an Minolta XD-7

Lenses sold per year by mount type

A lens mount is an interface – mechanical and often also electrical – between a photographic camera body and a lens. It is a feature of camera systems where the body allows interchangeable lenses, most usually the rangefinder camera, single lens reflex type, single lens mirrorless camera, or any movie camera of 16 mm or higher gauge. Lens mounts are also used to connect optical components in instrumentation that may not involve a camera, such as the modular components used in optical laboratory prototyping which join via C-mount or T-mount elements.

== Mount types ==
A lens mount may be a screw-threaded type, a bayonet-type, or a breech-lock (friction lock) type. Modern still camera lens mounts are of the bayonet type, because the bayonet mechanism precisely aligns mechanical and electrical features between lens and body. Screw-threaded mounts are fragile and do not align the lens in a reliable rotational position, yet types such as the C-mount interface are still widely in use for other applications like video cameras and optical instrumentation.

Bayonet mounts generally have a number of tabs (usually three or four) around the base of the lens, which fit into appropriately sized recesses in the lens mounting plate on the front of the camera. The tabs are often "keyed" in some way to ensure that the lens is inserted in only one orientation, often by making one tab a different size. Once inserted the lens is fastened by turning it a small amount, either clockwise or counterclockwise, depending on the mount. It is then locked in place by a spring-loaded pin, which can be operated to remove the lens by rotating it in the opposite direction.

Lens mounts of competing manufacturers (Sony, Nikon, Canon, Contax/Yashica, Pentax, etc.) are almost always incompatible. In addition to the mechanical and electrical interface variations, the flange focal distance from the lens mount to the film or sensor can also be different, along with differing throat sizes. Many allege that these incompatibilities are due to the desire of manufacturers to "lock in" consumers to their brand.

In movie cameras, the two most popular mounts in current usage on professional digital cinematography cameras are Arri's PL-mount and Panavision's PV-mount. The PL-Mount is used both on Arri and RED digital cinematography cameras, which as of 2012 are the most used cameras for films shot in digital. The Panavision mounts are exclusively used with Panavision lenses, and thus are only available on Panaflex cameras or third-party cameras "Panavised" by a Panavision rental house, whereas the PL-mount style is favored with most other cameras and cine lens manufacturers. Both of these mounts are held in place with locating pins and friction locking rings. Other mounts which are now largely historical or a minority in relation to current practices are listed below.

== List of lens mounts ==
Mount name	Flange focal distance	Frame size	Throat or thread diameter	Mount thread pitch	Mount type	Primary use	Camera lines
Kinor 16SP	52 mm	16 mm	43 mm		Breech lock	Cinematography	Kinor 16SP, Krasnogorsk-1, -2, -3 16mm movie cameras
Kinor 16SX	52 mm	16 mm	43 mm		Breech lock	Cinematography	Kinor 16SX-1M,-2M 16mm movie camera
OST/OCT-19	68 mm	35 mm	61 mm		Breech lock	Cinematography	Konvas-2M, Kinor-35H 35mm movie cameras
Kiev-16U	31 mm	16 mm	32 mm	0.5 mm	Screw	Cinematography	Kiev-16U/UE 16mm movie cameras
Kiev-16C	17.35 mm	16 mm	27 mm	0.75mm	Screw	Cinematography	Kiev-1C 16mm movie camera
Canon SV	32.00 mm				Bayonet	Photography (Digital)	Canon RC-701 & 760
Argus C3	40.3 mm	35 mm	34 mm	20 TPI	Screw	Photography	Argus C3
Canon EX	20 mm	1/2"			Bayonet	Photography	
Canon FL	42 mm	35 mm	48 mm		Breech lock	Photography	
Canon FD	42 mm	35 mm	48 mm		Breech lock	Photography	Canon F series, A series, and T series SLRs
Canon FDn (a.k.a. "New FD")	42 mm	35 mm	48 mm		Bayonet	Photography	completely interchangeable with earlier FD lenses
Canon EF	44.00 mm	35 mm	54 mm		Bayonet	Photography	Canon EOS 35mm film SLR, Full Frame & APS-H DSLR
Canon EF-S	44.00 mm	APS-C	54 mm		Bayonet	Photography (Digital)	Canon EOS APS-C DSLR
Canon EF-M	18 mm	APS-C	47 mm		Bayonet	Photography (Digital)	Canon EOS M series Mirrorless APS-C Cameras
Canon RF	20 mm	35 mm and APS-C	54 mm		Bayonet	Photography (Digital)	Canon EOS R series full-frame and APS-C mirrorless cameras; lenses designated as RF-S are optimized for APS-C sensors, but will mount on full-frame bodies
Nikon S	34.85 mm	35 mm	34 mm		Bayonet	Photography	Nikon Rangefinder
Nikon F	46.5 mm	35 mm	44 mm		Bayonet	Photography	Nikon F 35mm film SLR, Full Frame & APS-C DSLR
Nikon 1	17 mm	13.2 x 8.8mm	40 mm		Bayonet	Photography (Digital)	Nikon 1 series
Nikon Z	16 mm	35 mm and APS-C	55 mm		Bayonet	Photography (Digital)	Nikon Z - Mirrorless Full Frame, APS-C, & video
Sony Mavica	57 mm				Bayonet	Photography (Digital)	
Sony E | FE	18 mm	35 mm and APS-C	46.1 mm (1.815 inch)		Bayonet	Photography (Digital)	Sony NEX Mirrorless APS-C
Minolta SR	43.50 mm	35 mm	44.97 mm		Bayonet (54°)	Photography	Minolta SR/MC/MD
Minolta V	38.00 mm	APS-H	39.7 mm		Bayonet	Photography	Minolta Vectis
Minolta A	44.50 mm	35 mm and APS-C	49.7 mm (1.939 inch)		Bayonet (54°)	Photography	Minolta DSLR AF/Alpha/Dynax/Maxxum; Sony DSLR Alpha (α) A Mount
Pentax Auto 110	27 mm	110 film	19.5 mm		Bayonet	Photography	Pentax Auto 110 and Auto 110 Super
Pentax Q	9.2 mm	1/2.3", 1/1.7"	31 mm		Bayonet	Photography (Digital)	
Pentax K	45.46 mm	35 mm and APS-C	44 mm		Bayonet	Photography	Used also by Ricoh, Chinon, Agfa, Vivitar and KMZ Zenit cameras
Leitz Visoflex I	91.3 mm	35 mm	M39	26 TPI	Screw	Photography	
Leitz Visoflex II/III	67.8 mm	35 mm	44 mm		Bayonet (Leica M)	Photography	
Leica M	27.80 mm	35 mm	44 mm		Bayonet	Photography	Leica M series Leica CL; Minolta CLE
Leica R	47.00 mm	35 mm	49 mm		Bayonet	Photography	
Leica L	20 mm	35 mm and APS-C	51.6 mm		Bayonet	Photography (Digital)	L-Mount Alliance (Leica, Panasonic, Sigma, DJI and Blackmagic Design cameras)
Contax RF	34.85 mm	35 mm	44 mm		Double bayonet	Photography	Contax I, II, III, IIa, IIIa; Kiev rangefinders
Contax G	29.00 mm	35 mm	44 mm		Breech lock	Photography	
Contax N	48 mm	35 mm	55 mm		Bayonet	Photography	
Contax/Yashica	45.5 mm	35 mm	48 mm		Bayonet	Photography	Yashica/Contax
Yashica MA	~45.8 mm	35 mm			Bayonet	Photography	Kyocera Yashica 230 AF etc.
Fujica X	43.5 mm	35 mm	49 mm		Bayonet	Photography	Fujica-X
Fujifilm X	17.7 mm	APS-C	44 mm		Bayonet	Photography (Digital)	Fujifilm X series mirrorless
Olympus Pen F	28.95 mm	35 mm half-frame			Bayonet	Photography	
Olympus OM	46 mm	35 mm	46 mm		Bayonet	Photography	
Four Thirds	38.67 mm	17.3 mm × 12.98 mm	~44 mm		Bayonet	Photography (Digital)	Olympus E Panasonic Lumix DMC-L; Leica Digilux
Micro Four Thirds	19.25 mm	17.3 mm × 12.98 mm	~38 mm		Bayonet	Photography (Digital)	Olympus Pen & OM-D series Panasonic G, GF, GX & GH Series; Blackmagic Design Cinema Camera
KM	28 mm (27.80 mm?)	35 mm	44 mm		Bayonet	Photography	Konica Hexar RF
Konica F	40.50 mm	35 mm	40 mm		Bayonet	Photography	Konica F
Konica AR	40.50 mm	35 mm	47 mm		Bayonet	Photography	Konica Autoreflex
Samsung NX mini	6.95 mm	1"	38 mm		Bayonet	Photography (Digital)	
Samsung NX	25.5 mm	APS-C	42 mm		Bayonet	Photography (Digital)	
Samsung Kenox	44.5 mm	35 mm			Bayonet	Photography	Manual focus only; there is only one compatible camera - Samsung Kenox GX-1/Samsung SR4000.
DJI DL	16.84 mm	35 mm and APS-C	58 mm		Bayonet	Photography (Digital), Cinematography	For aerial drone and gimbal use; DJI Zenmuse X7, X9 and DJI Ronin 4D X9 cameras.
Icarex BM	48.00 mm	35 mm			Breech lock	Photography	Icarex 35S
D	12.29 mm	8 mm	15.88 mm (0.625 inch)	32 TPI	Screw	Cinematography	
CS	12.526 mm	1/3", 1/2"	25.40 mm (1 inch)	32 TPI	Screw	Cinematography / Industrial	
C	17.526 mm (0.69 inches)	1/2", 16 mm, 2/3", 1"	25.40 mm (1 inch)	32 TPI	Screw	Cinematography / Industrial / Machine Vision	
S (a.k.a. M12)	N/A. Screw mount must be adjusted manually for back focus. Back focal distance from <1mm to 12mm.	1/6" to 1"	12 mm	0.5 mm pitch	Screw	CCTV, PCB	Edmund Optics μ-Video
Bolex Bajonet	23.22 mm	16 mm			Breech lock	Cinematography	effective focal distance 17.526 mm (0.69 inches) due to beam splitter behind mount flange (accepts C-mount lenses with adapter)
1/3" bayonet mount	25 mm	1/3" (5.24x2.94)			Bayonet	Video	JVC professional video cameras
M39 (a.k.a. L-Mount, LTM)	28.80 mm	35 mm	M39	26 TPI	Screw	Photography	Leica M39 screw mount
Narciss	28.8 mm	16 mm	M24	1 mm	Screw	Photography	
1/2" bayonet mount	37.80 mm	1/2" (6.97x3.92)			Bayonet	Video	Non-Sony professional video cameras
Alpa	37.80 mm	35 mm	42 mm		Bayonet	Photography	
Sony 1/2" Video	38 mm	1/2" (6.97x3.92)			Bayonet	Video	Sony professional video cameras
Aaton universal	40 mm	16 mm	50 mm		Breech lock	Cinematography	
Miranda bayonet/M44	41.5 mm	35 mm and APS-C			Bayonet	Photography	Miranda Camera Company
Petriflex	43.5 mm	35 mm			Breech lock	Photography	
Sigma SA	44.00 mm	35 mm	44 mm		Bayonet	Photography	Sigma SA
Paxette	44 mm	35 mm	M39	1 mm	Screw	Photography	
Praktiflex	44 mm	35 mm	M40	1 mm	Screw	Photography	
Praktica	44.40 mm	35 mm	42 mm		Bayonet	Photography	
Exakta	44.7 mm	35 mm	46 mm		Bayonet	Photography	Exakta, Topcon Super
Zenit M39	45.2 mm	35 mm	M39	1 mm	Screw	Photography	
M37	45.46 mm	35 mm	37 mm	1 mm	Screw	Photography	Asahiflex
M42	45.46 mm	35 mm	42 mm	1 mm	Screw	Photography	Praktica, Pentax, Zenit
B4-mount	48 mm	2/3" (9.6x5.4)			Breech lock	Video	Professional and broadcast video cameras
Praktina	50 mm	35 mm	46 mm		Breech lock	Photography	
T-Thread (Very earliest type)	50.7 mm	35 mm	M37	0.75mm	Screw	Photography	Tamron
Adapt-A-Matic	50.7 mm	35 mm	54 mm		Bayonet	Photography	Tamron
Adaptall & Adaptall-2	50.7 mm	35 mm	54 mm		Bayonet	Photography	Tamron
Arri standard	52 mm	35 mm and 16 mm	64 mm		Tab lock	Cinematography	
Arri bayonet	52 mm	35 mm and 16 mm	64 mm		Bayonet	Cinematography	
Arri PL	52 mm	35 mm and 16 mm	54 mm		Breech lock	Cinematography	
Arri LPL	44 mm	Arri LF	62 mm		Breech lock	Cinematography	
Arri Maxi PL	52 mm	70 mm	64 mm			Cinematography	
T	55 mm	35 mm	42 mm	0.75 mm	Screw	Photography	Tamron
YS Auto T-Thread	55 mm	35 mm	42 mm	0.75 mm	Screw	Photography	Sigma Corporation
T-thread	55 mm	35 mm	47 mm	0.75 mm	Screw	Photography	Tokina
H-Mount	55 mm	35 mm	47 mm	0.75 mm	Screw	Photography	Hanimex (rebranding of Tokina M47)
Panavision PV	57.15 mm	35 mm	49.5 mm		Breech lock	Cinematography	
B3-mount	58 mm	2/3"			Reverse bayonet	Video	Ikegami
Mitchell BNCR	61.468 mm	35 mm	68 mm		Breech lock	Cinematography	
Zeiss Panflex 5522/23 for Contax RF	64.50 mm	35 mm			Double bayonet	Photography	
Kowa Six/Super 66	79 mm	6×6			Breech lock	Photography	
Hasselblad	74.9 mm	6×6	69 mm		Bayonet	Photography	
Hasselblad Xpan	34.27 mm	35 mm panoramic	46 mm		Bayonet	Photography	
Bronica ETR	69 mm	6×4.5			Bayonet	Photography	
Bronica RF	43.92 mm	6×4.5			Bayonet	Photography	
Bronica SQA	101.7 mm	6×6	57 mm		Bayonet	Photography	
Bronica GS1	85 mm	6×7	80.5 mm		Bayonet	Photography	
Mamiya 645	63.3 mm	6×4.5	62 mm		Bayonet	Photography	
Mamiya 6	56.2 mm (approx.)	6×6			Bayonet	Photography	
Mamiya 7/7II	59 mm (approx.)	6×7	49 mm		Bayonet	Photography	
Mamiya RZ67	105 mm	6×7	60 mm		Bayonet	Photography	
Mamiya RB67	112 mm	6×7	60 mm		Bayonet	Photography	
Mamiya ZE	45.5 mm	35 mm			Bayonet	Photography	
Mamiya/Sekor E	43.5 mm	35 mm	49 mm		Bayonet	Photography	
Pentax 645	70.87 mm	6×4.5	61.2 mm		Bayonet	Photography	
Pentax 6x7	84.95 mm	6×7	72 mm		Bayonet	Photography	
Pentacon Six	74.1 mm	6×6	60 mm		Breech lock	Photography	
Fujifilm G	26.7 mm	43.8x32.9 mm	65 mm		Bayonet	Photography (Digital)	Fujifilm GFX series
Rolleiflex SL66	102.8 mm	6×6			Bayonet	Photography	
Rolleiflex SL35	44.46 mm	35 mm	46 mm		Bayonet	Photography	
RMS thread, society thread	150/180 mm		0.8", Whitworth	36 tpi	Screw	Microscope	older microscopes
Leica; Nikon Biological	Unknown		M25	0.75 mm	Screw	Microscope	
BD Mount	Unknown		M26	0.7 mm	Screw	Microscope	Mitutoyo; Olympus BD; Nikon BD
Zeiss	Unknown		M27	0.75 mm	Screw	Microscope	
TFL	17.526 mm	28 mm	M35	0.75 mm	Screw	Machine Vision	
TFL II	17.526 mm	35 mm	M48	0.75 mm	Screw	Machine Vision	
Pentax Auto 110	27 mm	110 Film	20.6 mm		Bayonet	Photography	Auto 110

For small camera modules, used in e.g. CCTV systems and machine vision, a range of metric thread mounts exists. The smallest ones can be found also in e.g. cellphones and endoscopes. The most common by far is the M12x0.5, followed by M8x0.5 and M10x0.5.

- M4.2x0.2 (1/7" sensors)
- M4.6x0.25 (1/5", 2.4mm, 3.8mm sensors, industrial endoscopes)
- M5x0.35 (1/6", 1/5" sensors)
- M5.5x0.35 (1.7", 1/5.8", 1/5", 1/4" sensors)
- M6x0.35 (1/4", 5.2mm, 4.85mm sensors)
- M6.4x0.25 (1/3" sensors)
- M7x0.35 (1.8", 1.7", 1/6", 1/5", 1/4", 1/3.6", 1/3.2", 1/2.7", 4.85mm sensors)
- M8x0.35 (1/4", 1/3" sensors)
- M8x0.5 (1/5", 1/4", 1/3" sensors; sometimes occurs in diode laser modules)
- M9x0.5 (1/2.7", 1/3", 1/3.2" sensors; also commonly encountered in diode laser modules)
- M10x0.5 (1/4", 1/3" sensors)
- M12x0.5 (the S-mount, listed in the table)
- M22x0.5 (1/1.2" sensors)

== Focusing lens mount ==
The axial adjustment range for focusing Ultra wide angle lenses and some Wide-angle lenses in large format cameras is usually very small.

So some manufacturers (e.g. Linhof) offered special focusing lens mounts, so-called wide-angle focusing accessories for their cameras. With such a device, the lens could be focused precisely without moving the entire front standard.

== Secondary lens mount ==
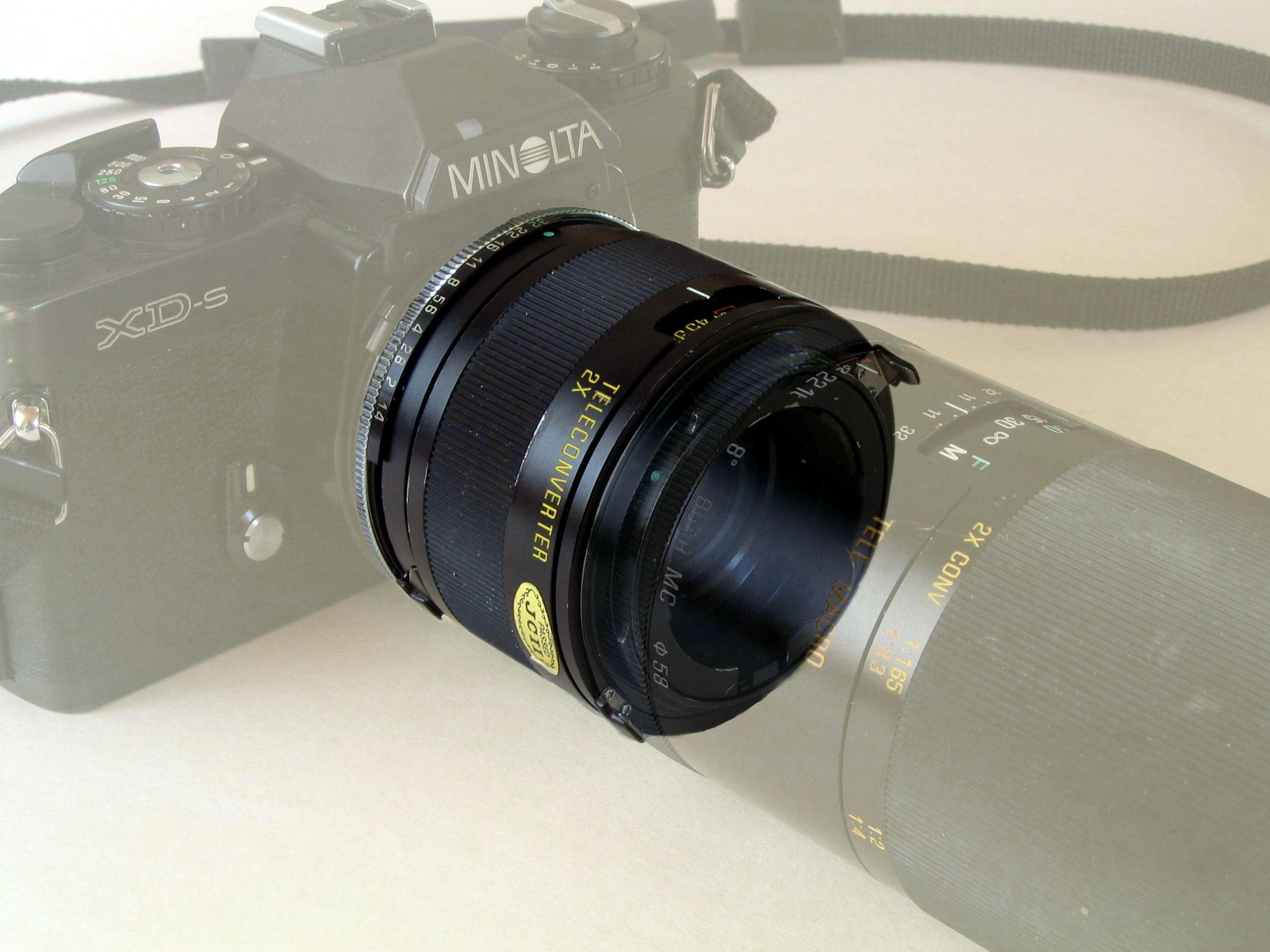
A teleconverter attached between a camera and its objective

Secondary lens refers to a multi-element lens mounted either in front of a camera's primary lens, or in between the camera body and the primary lens.

(D)SLR camera & interchangeable-lens manufacturers offer lens accessories like extension tubes and secondary lenses like teleconverters, which mount in between the camera body and the primary lens, both using and providing a primary lens mount. Various lensmakers also offer optical accessories that mount in front of the lens; these may include wide-angle, telephoto, fisheye, and close-up or macro adapters.

Canon PowerShot A and Canon PowerShot G cameras have a built-in or non-interchangeable primary (zoom) lens, and Canon has "conversion tube" accessories available for some Canon PowerShot camera models which provide either a 52mm or 58mm "accessory/filter" screw thread. Canon's close-up, wide- (WC-DC), and tele-conversion (TC-DC) lenses have 2, 3, and 4-element lenses respectively, so they are multi-element lenses and not diopter "filters".

== Lens mount adapters ==
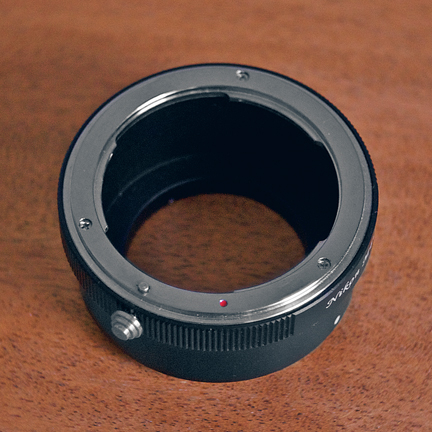
This lens adapter is a passive adapter designed for mounting a Nikon F mount lens to a Micro Four Thirds camera.

Lens mount adapters are designed to attach a lens to a camera body with non-matching mounts. Generally, a lens can be easily adapted to a camera body with a smaller flange focal distance by simply adding space between the camera and the lens. When attempting to adapt a lens to a camera body with a larger flange focal distance, the adapter must include a secondary lens in order to compensate. This has the side effect of decreasing the amount of light that reaches the sensor, as well as adding a crop factor to the lens. Without the secondary lens, these adapters will function as an extension tube and will not be able to focus to infinity.

In addition, active lens adapters will include electronic connections, enabling communication between the lens and the camera.

== See also ==
- ISO metric screw thread
- Lens board

== Notes ==
A: The authoritative normative source for 4/3 standards information is Four-Thirds.Org and not 3rd-party reviews.

4/3's published facts:

- "Size of the 4/3-type Sensor: The standard diagonal length of the sensor is 21.63 millimetres (0.852 in). It is half that of 35-mm film format (36 millimetres (1.4 in) x 24 millimetres (0.94 in) = 43.27 millimetres (1.704 in)) The image circle of the interchangeable lens is specified based on this diagonal length. The focal length is about a half that of a 135 film camera lens assuming the same angle of view."
- "The foundation for the high picture quality of the Four Thirds system is the lens mount, which is about twice the diameter of the image circle."
- "Differences between Four Thirds System mount and Micro Four Thirds System mount: Mount diameter reduction; As a result of research aimed at facilitating the design of compact, lightweight lenses while maintaining the current strength, the outer diameter of the lens mount has been reduced by approx. 6 millimetres (0.24 in). ... the Micro Four Thirds System ... specifies the optimum flange back length required to reduce camera size and thickness, assuming the omission of the mirror box. The flange back length has been reduced to about 1/2 that of the Four Thirds System."

So:

- 21.63mm * 2 = 43.26 millimetres (1.703 in) or ~44mm
- 43.26mm – 6mm = 37.26 millimetres (1.467 in) or ~38mm
- $\mathrm{(21.63\ mm)^2 = 17.3\ mm ^ 2 + 12.98\ mm ^ 2}$; See: Pythagorean theorem ($5^2 = 4^2 + 3^2$)

NOTE: Some published reviews of 4/3 instead cite the (female) "outside diameter" of the lens or mount as ~50mm (and micro-4/3 as ~44mm), and not the appropriate major diameter (D) ~44mm which is the camera body's female mount inside-diameter and the lens's male mount outside-diameter (micro-4/3 ~38mm).
