= S-mount (CCTV lens) =

Lens mount used in some CCTV cameras and webcams

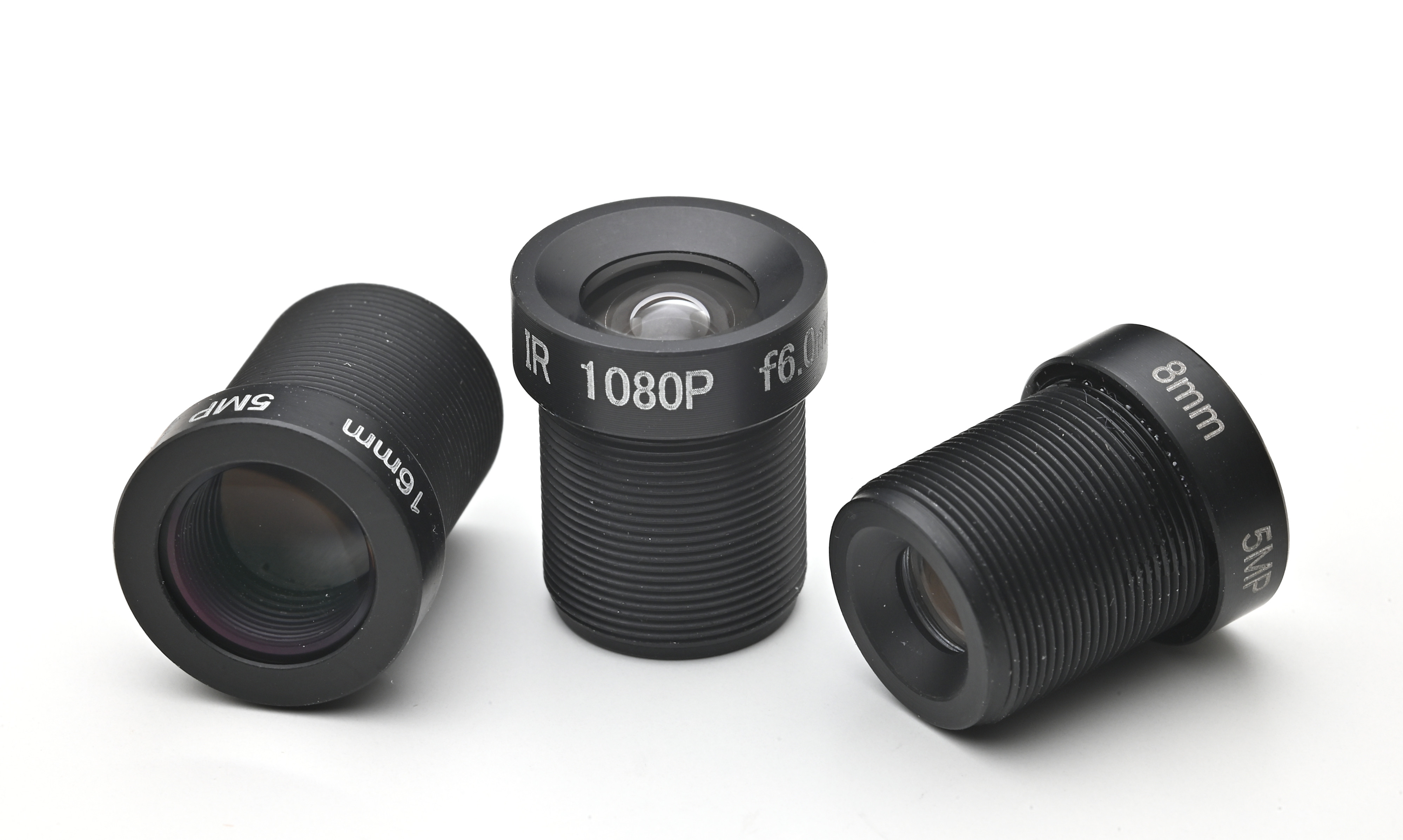
Three S-mount lenses with different focal lengths (left to right: 16 mm, 6 mm and 8 mm)

The S-mount is a standard lens mount used in various surveillance CCTV cameras and webcams. It uses a male metric M12 thread with 0.5 mm pitch on the lens and a corresponding female thread on the lens mount. S-mount lenses are often called "M12 lenses" due to the ISO metric screw thread designation of the lens's thread, M12 × 0.5. Because the lens mounts are usually attached directly to the PCB of the sensor, they are often called "board lenses". The supported sensor formats range from smaller than 1/6-inch type up to 1 inch having, a 16 mm diagonal sensor. The lenses lack an iris control. S-mount lenses do not have a flange and therefore there is no fixed lens to sensor distance and they must be adjusted to focus. Due to the small size of the lens barrel, performance is somewhat limited compared to larger lenses and most S-mount lenses are relatively slow (f/1.6 and slower). High-end CCTV cameras generally use C- or CS-mount lenses, where much faster apertures like f/1.0 are common.

== See also ==
- List of lens mounts
