= C mount =

Type of camera lens mount

C-mount
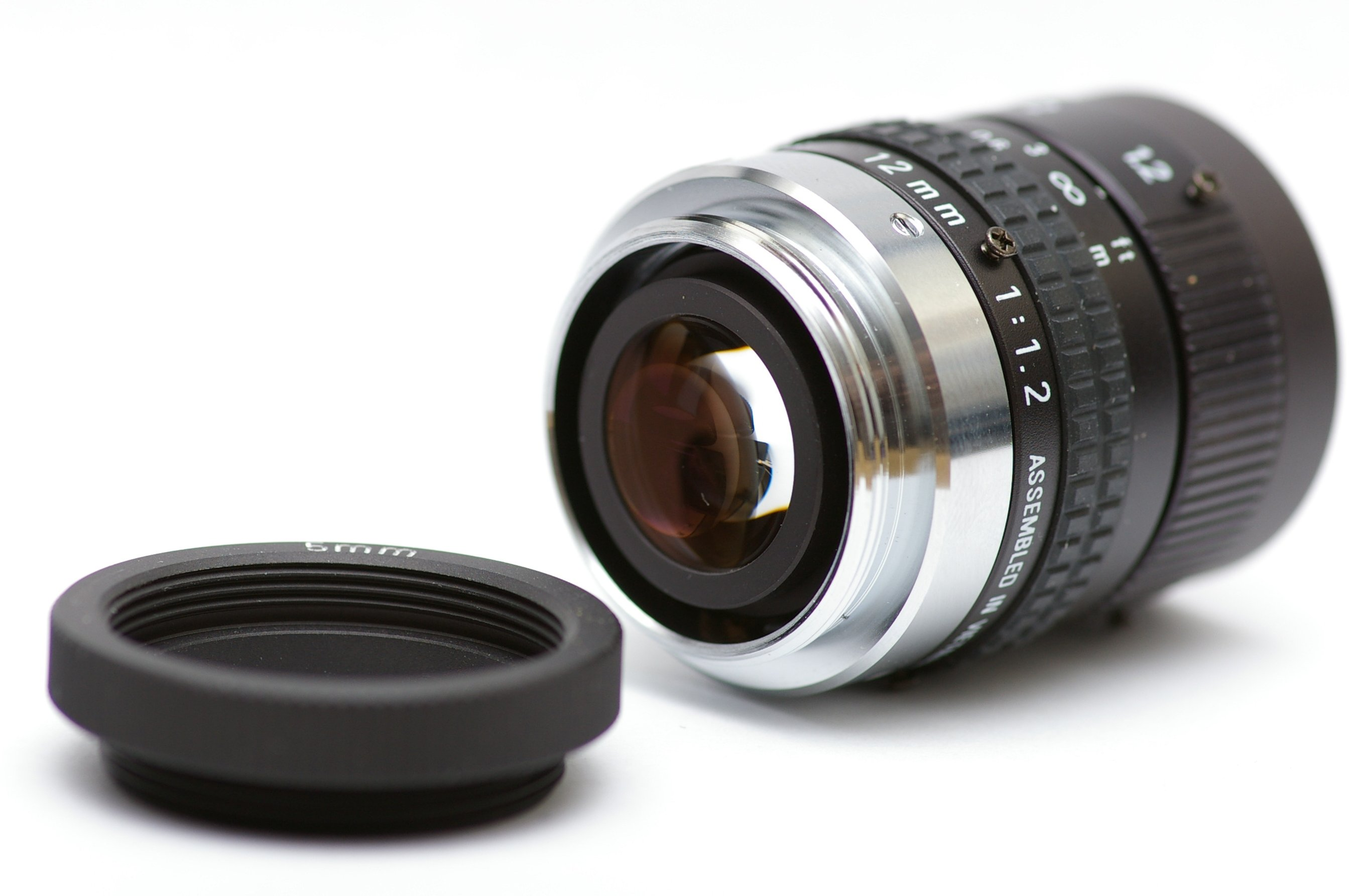
- 12 mm f/1.2 C-mount lens with a C-mount–to–CS-mount adapter
- Type: Screw
- Flange: 17.526 millimetres (0.6900 in)

A C mount is a type of lens mount commonly found on 16 mm movie cameras, closed-circuit television cameras, machine vision cameras and microscope phototubes.

C-mount lenses provide a male thread, which mates with a female thread on the camera. The thread is nominally 1 inch (25.4 mm) in diameter, with 32 threads per inch (0.794 mm pitch), designated as "1-32 UN 2A" in the ANSI B1.1 standard for unified screw threads. The flange focal distance is 17.526 millimetres (0.6900 in) for a C mount.

Merely to say that a lens is "C-mount" says very little about the lens's intended use. C-mount lenses have been made for many different formats. C-mount lenses are built for the 8 mm and 16 mm film formats and the 1/3", 1/2", 2/3", 1", and 4/3" video formats, which corresponds to a range of image circles approximately from 5 to 22 mm in diameter.

Depending on the format, the design of the lens and its performance will differ considerably. For example, for the 4/3 format, a 12 mm lens is a wide-angle lens and will have a retrofocus design. For the 2/3-inch format, a 12 mm lens is "normal" and can have a simple and fast double Gauss layout. For the 1/3-inch format, a 12 mm lens is long and can have a telephoto design.

Some TV lenses lack provision to focus or vary the aperture, so may not operate properly with film cameras. Also, some TV lenses may have bits that protrude behind the mount far enough to interfere with the shutter or reflex finder mechanisms of a film camera.

Although C-mount lenses have a back focal distance far too short to be used with 35 mm film SLRs or any existing digital SLR, they can be mounted on interchangeable-lens mirrorless digital cameras such as the Micro Four Thirds used by Olympus and Panasonic. However, the vast majority of C-mount lenses produce an image circle too small to effectively cover the entire sensor which has approximately 22 mm diagonal, this produces vignetting. The Nikon 1 series and the Pentax Q series can use C-mount lenses without vignetting.

C mount was created by Bell & Howell for their Filmo 70 cine cameras. The earliest Filmos had slightly different mounts, known as A mount, and B mount. C mount was found on Filmo 70 cameras with serial numbers 54090 and higher, probably from about 1926. Soon after, other camera manufacturers adopted the same mount, and it became a de facto standard for 16 mm cine cameras.

== CS mount ==
CS-mount has a flange focal distance of 12.526 millimetres (0.4931 in), compared to 17.526 millimetres (0.6900 in) for a C mount, but is otherwise the same as C-mount, including the fact that lenses for many different formats are made for it. CS-mount lenses are built for the smaller formats, 1/2 inch and down.

Combinations: C, CS and extension adapter
Camera body	Extension tube adapter	Lens	Net effect	Focus	View angle	Zoom	Exposure
C		C		Normal	Normal	Normal	Normal
C		CS	+5 mm	Near-sighted	Narrower	Larger	Darker
C	5.0 mm (0.20 in)	C	+5 mm	Near-sighted	Narrower	Larger	Darker
C	5.0 mm (0.20 in)	CS	+10 mm	Most near-sighted	Narrowest	Largest	Darkest
CS		C	−5 mm	Far-sighted	Wider	Smaller	Brighter
CS		CS		Normal	Normal	Normal	Normal
CS	5.0 mm (0.20 in)	C		Normal	Normal	Normal	Normal
CS	5.0 mm (0.20 in)	CS	+5 mm	Near-sighted	Narrower	Larger	Darker

== See also ==
- T-mount
- Lens mount
- Pentax K-mount
- D-mount
- PL-mount
- S-mount
