= Start (Soviet camera) =

Soviet 35mm camera

Start (Старт)
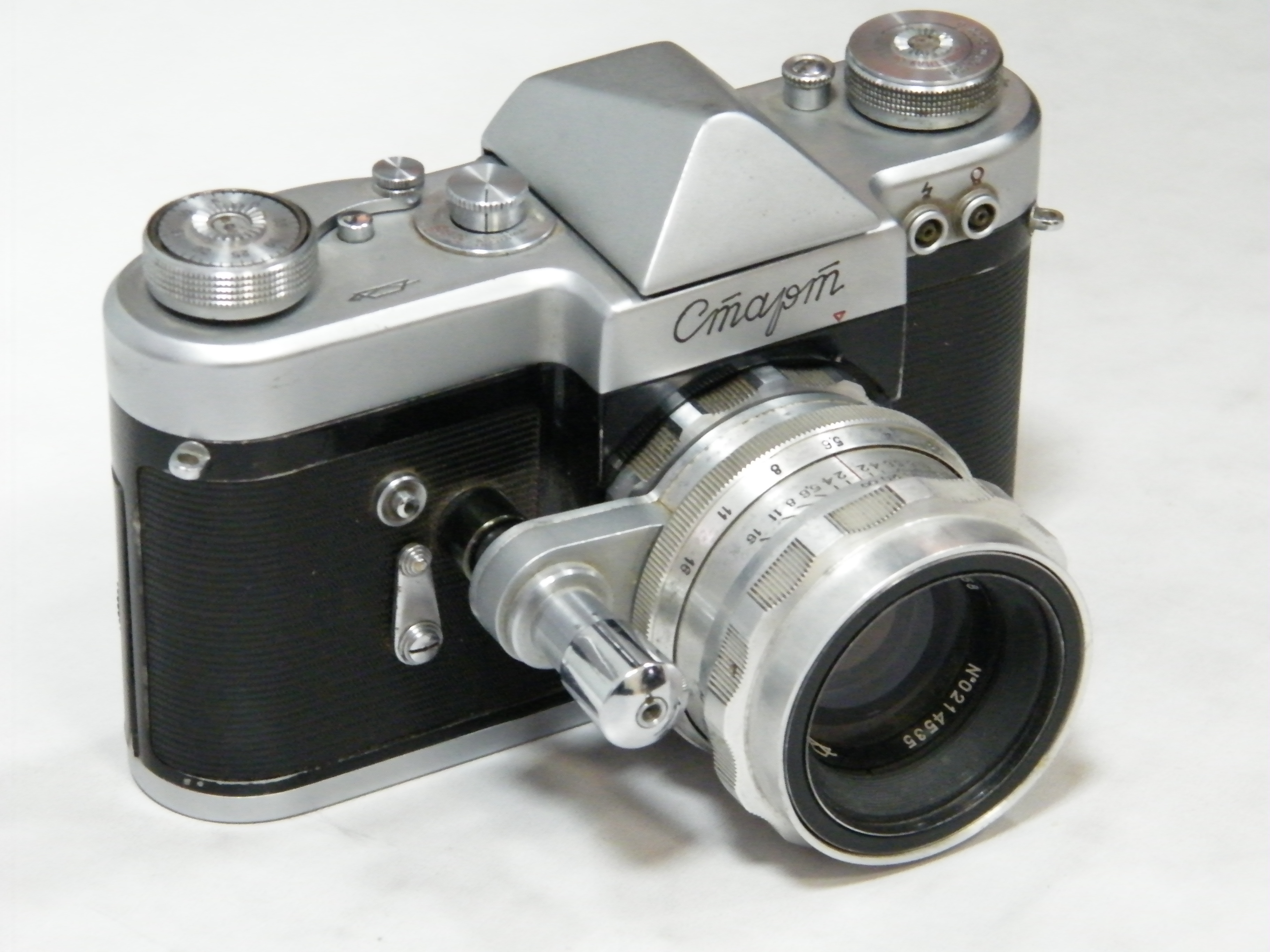

Overview
- Maker: Mechanical Factory of Krasnogorsk (KMZ)
- Type: Single-lens reflex
- Production: 1958–1964

Lens
- Lens mount: Proprietary (breech-locking bayonet)
- Lens: 44-58mm f/2.0 Helios-44
- F-numbers: 2.0

Sensor/medium
- Film format: 35mm
- Film size: 24×36 mm
- Recording medium: Film

Focusing
- Focus: Manual

Flash
- Flash synchronization: 1/25 s, 1/30 s

Shutter
- Shutter speed range: 1 s to 1/1000 s
- Shutter speeds: B, 500, 200, 100, 50, 25

Viewfinder
- Viewfinder: Pentaprism
- Optional viewfinders: Waist-level

General
- Body features: Iron
- Dimensions: 14.4 cm × 10.1 cm × 9.8 cm
- Weight: 1,300 g
- Made in: Soviet Union

Chronology
- Successor: Start-2

Start (Russian: Старт) was a Soviet 35 mm single-lens reflex camera produced by the Mechanical Factory of Krasnogorsk (KMZ) from 1958 through 1964. The camera was inspired by the Exakta camera. The Start used bayonet-mounted lenses and had an Exakta-style shutter release arm, a KMZ Helios 44-58 mm f/2 lens, and a cloth focal-plane shutter.

An improved version, the Start-2, was produced ca. 1963–1964, featuring an automatic diaphragm and a metered prism.
