= Olympus FTL =

The Olympus FTL was a 35mm single-lens reflex camera (SLR) sold by Olympus between 1971 and 1972. It was a transition model between the Pen F half-frame SLR and full-frame OM-1. The FTL was a very traditional SLR with 42mm screw lenses.

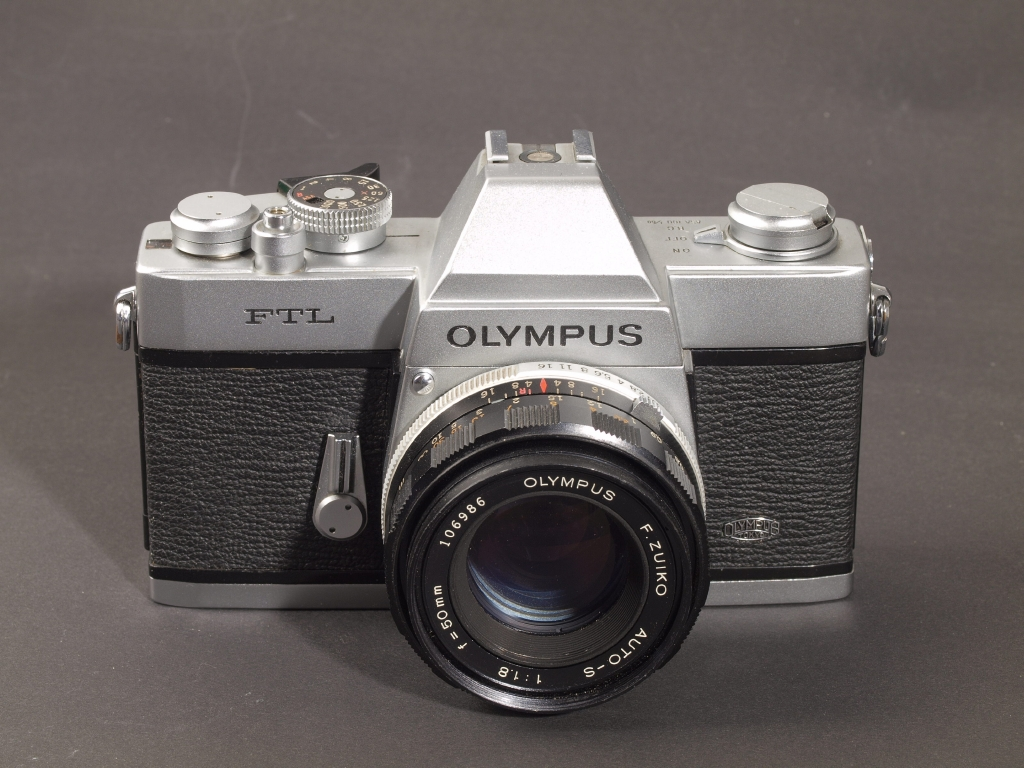
Olympus FTL

== Lenses ==
=== Wide Angle Lenses ===
- 28mm f3.5
- 35mm f2.8

=== Standard Lenses ===
- 50mm f1.8
- 50mm f1.4

=== Telephoto Lenses ===
- 135mm f3.5
- 200mm f4

== Accessories ==
Despite the relatively short product life cycle, there was still a full range of accessories available for the FTL.

- Set of three extension rings
- Macro bellows
- Focusing rail
- Slide copier
- Microscope adapter
- Close-up lenses, two models
- Repro stand
- Electronic flash unit
- Filters
- Lens hoods

== See also ==
- List of Olympus products
