= Camera lens throat =

Inner diameter of a camera lens mount

A lens throat is the inner diameter of a camera lens mount. It is the width of the opening, measured between two non-obstructed points, i.e., not including the mounting tabs on a bayonet mount.

Canon stated, "Throat size is crucial for determining the angle of incidence and provides us with a more realistic picture of the mount's capabilities."

In an interchangeable lens camera, the combination of the throat diameter and the flange distance affect the angle of incidence. A larger throat and a smaller flange distance make for a larger angle of incidence, allowing for more flexibility in lens design, without requiring retrofocus designs for wider angle lenses.

The elements of a lens can have wider diameters with a larger throat diameter, meaning that surface curvature can be less drastic. And with a well-designed lens with lessened surface curvature you get less chromatic aberration. The larger throat more easily allows lenses which reduce the corner shading while being less complex in design.

A disadvantage of a larger throat diameter is that a lens must be thicker at the mounting point of the lens, possibly leading to increased weight. Although as noted previously, a less complex design can mean fewer lens elements in the design.

== See also ==
- Camera
- Geometrical optics
- Lens adapter
