= B4-mount =

1992 standard for camera mounts

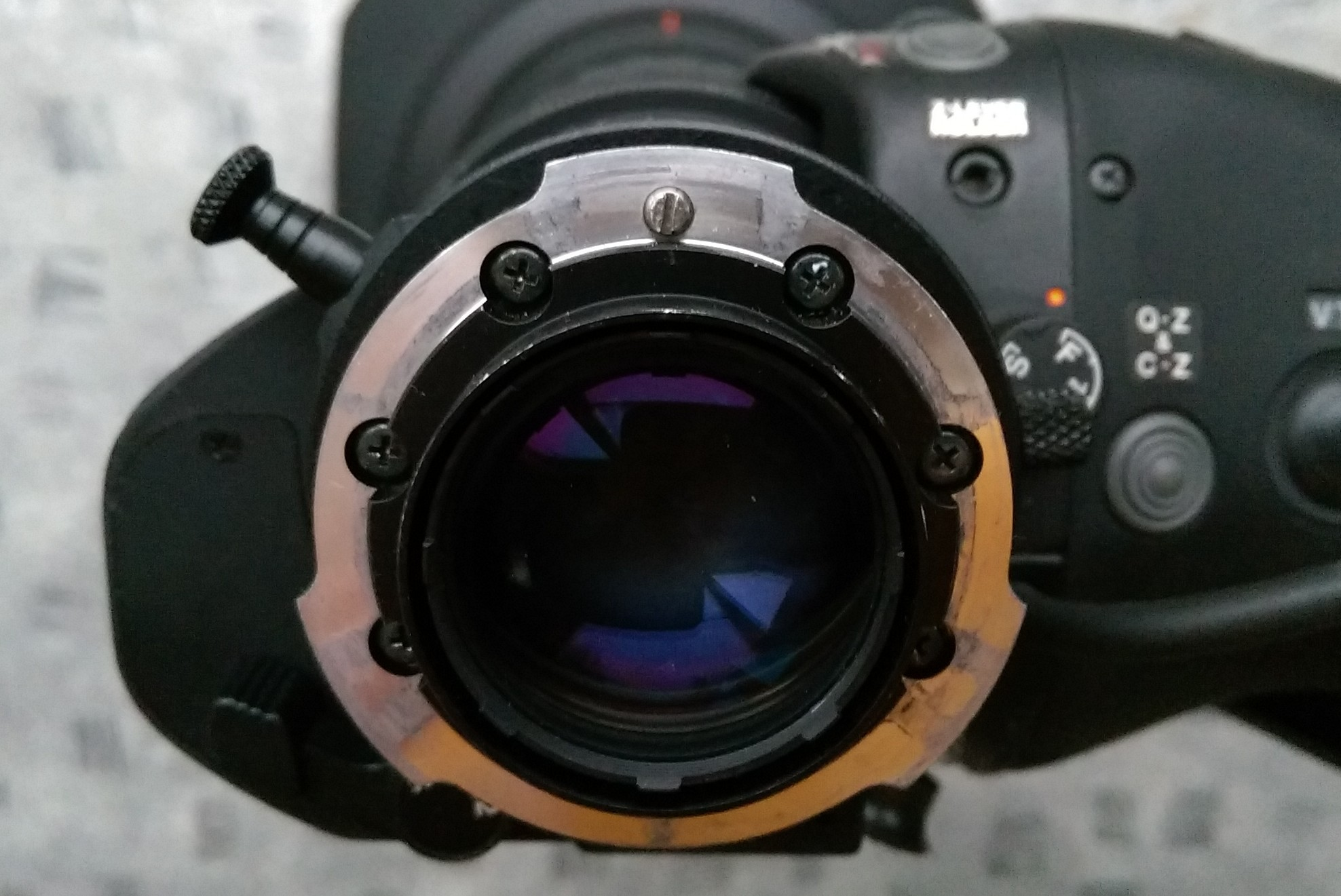
B4-mount of Fujinon A13x4.5 lens

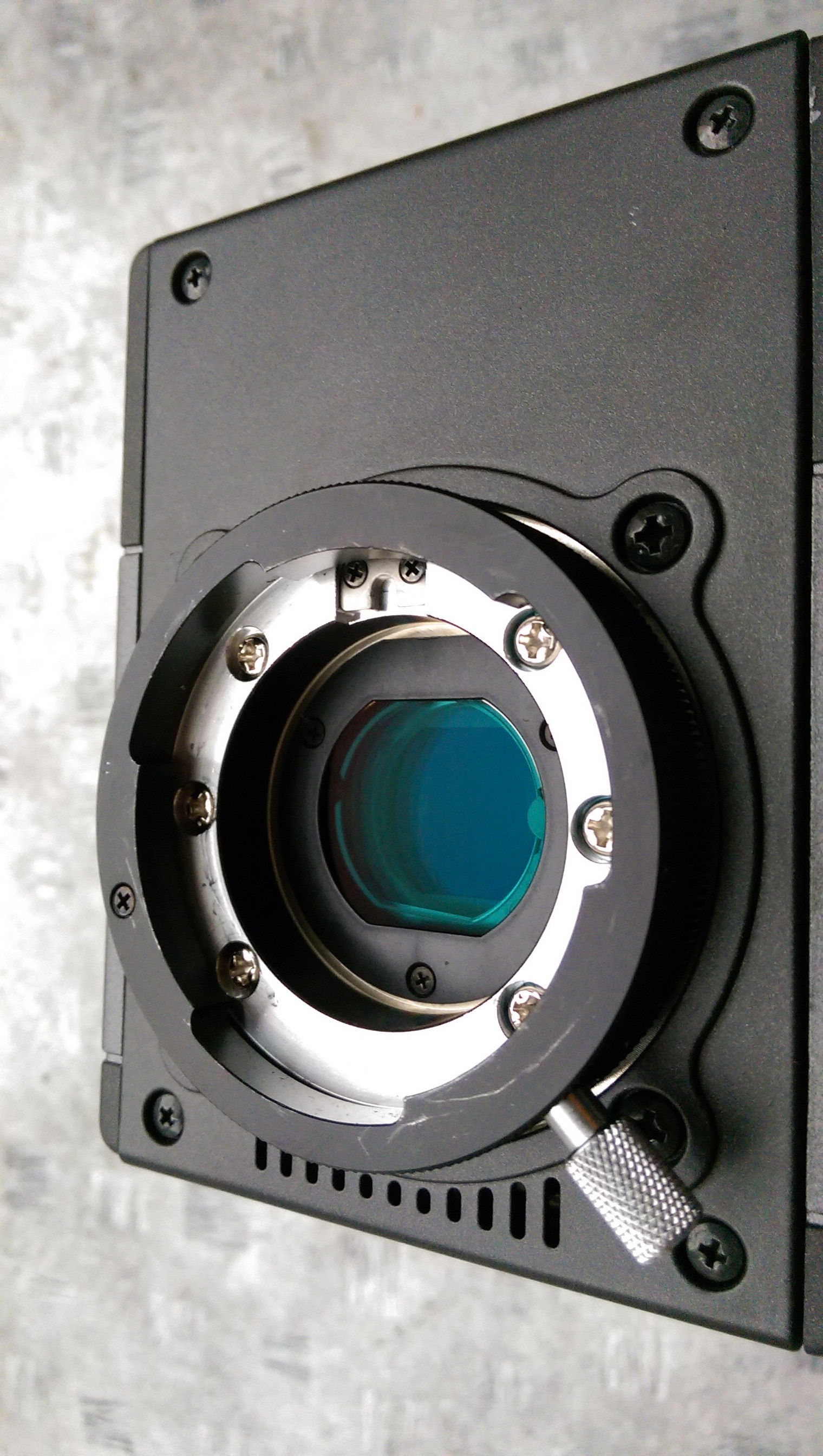
B4-mount of Panasonic AK-HC1500G camera

The B4 lens mount was standardized in 1992 by the Broadcasting Technology Association (BTA) and is defined in BTA S-1005. This standard defines the physical mount, but also optical properties and some electrical connections. The B4 mount defines the sensor to have a diagonal size of 11 mm (a so-called 2/3" size sensor). The B4-mount is used by practically all 2/3" broadcast lenses and cameras (as of 2019).

Although the standard was set in 1992, the B4 mount already existed before 1980. The Sony BVP-300, produced from 1978, was possibly the first camera with a B4 mount. Further, all Sony Betacam cameras had a B4 mount.

The BTA was formed by Japanese broadcaster NHK and included members from Canon, Fuji, Hitachi, Ikegami, JVC, Matsushita (Panasonic), Nikon, Sony and Toshiba. It was formed in the mid-1980s and set various standards for television. It is now part of ARIB, Association of Radio Industries and Businesses.

== Mechanical ==
The flange of the mount defines the positioning of the lens relative to the image sensor. A ring is present around the opening on the camera which, when rotated, tightly locks the flange of the lens against the camera. A pin on the top side of the lens flange and a hole in the camera mount make sure the lens cannot be mounted at an angle.

== Optical ==
The B4-mount has its image projected at 48 mm behind the lens mount flange (in air). The standard defines that a prism splits the light to form separate images planes for the colours red, green and blue. A correction for chromatic aberration is also part of the standard: the red sensor should be 10 μm further, and the blue one 5 μm further than 48 mm. This fitted well with established TV-camera technology using 3 tubes, and also with 3CCD, a technology in development at the time of the definition of the standard.

The standard defines that the diagonal size of the projected image should be 11 mm, but does not define a resolution to be used. In the past standard definition was captured at 4:3 aspect ratio. Nowadays, cameras with the same mount capture HD with 16:9 aspect ratio, or even 4K video, thanks to improved lenses.

== Electrical ==
The lens mount is accompanied by a connector for the electrical connections. It powers the lens motors, controls the iris and allows a few buttons on the lens handle to control camera functions. The connectors are made by Hirose. On the camera is a HR10-10R-12S receptacle, and on the lens a cable with a HR10-10P-12P plug.

Pin	Function	Direction	Description
1	RET SW	lens to camera	Connected to RET button on lens; GND when pressed, otherwise open
2	VTR SW	lens to camera	Connected to VTR or REC button on lens; GND when pressed, otherwise open
3	GND	camera to lens	Ground
4	IRIS ENF AUTO	camera to lens	Momentary auto iris, off: 0V, on: 5V
5	IRIS CONT	camera to lens	Voltage indicative of requested iris position, f/2.8: 6.2V, f/16: 3.4V
6	+12V	camera to lens	Power supply
7	IRIS FOLLOW	lens to camera	Voltage indicative of current iris position, f/2.8: 6.2V, f/16: 3.4V
8	IRIS A/R	camera to lens	Iris auto: 0V, remote: 5V
9	EXT ANS	lens to camera	Connected to GND when extender is engaged, otherwise open
10	ZOOM FOLLOW	lens to camera	Voltage indicative of current zoom position, Wide: 2V, Tele: 7V
11	RxD	lens to camera	Receive serial data (sometimes instead used for focus follow)
12	TxD	camera to lens	Transmit serial data

== Digital protocol ==
The digital communication on pins 11 and 12 of the Hirose Connector is based on the Fujinon L10 Protocol, which was originally developed for external control of their Digipower line of lenses, as well as their CCTV Line (called C10 there). The communication is based around inverted UART at 0v-5v TTL levels. However, the protocol got expanded quite a bit since the last publicly available revision V1.4. Known differences between the L10 protocol, and the protocol actually used between lens and camera include:

- Autobauding: The lens has to be capable of automatically detecting the baudrate of the camera, since different cameras use different baudrates. The Blackmagic Design Ursa line uses 78400Boud for example.
- Undocumented features like request for the Lenses Serial number, more "Switch" Position feedbacks and additional set and request commands for Analog values.
- The request for multiple feedback values at once got expanded to 3 commands with up to four values each per request (five values according to reverse engineering)
