= Dandelion chip =

An autofocus confirmation chip or dandelion chip is an electronic device, installed on the bayonet mount of a non-electronic camera lens or adapter, which enables electronic interoperation with certain cameras. The device consists of an integrated circuit connected to a series of exposed electrical contacts, in a curved package which matches the lens mount. It is designed to be affixed in a particular position on the mount, in order to mate with matching contacts on the camera body. The contacts on both sides of the mount are commonly known as CPU contacts.

Camera functions enabled by the chip may include exposure metering, aperture display and/or control, focus confirmation and fine-tuning, and Exif metadata recording. Most chips can be configured by the user through a rudimentary interface only requiring the use of a camera.

== Background ==
The Nikon F-mount was introduced in 1959 with the Nikon F; at the time, lenses and cameras interfaced in a purely mechanical fashion, with the camera either holding the aperture fully open or letting it stop down to the selected value, and the lens indicating the selected relative position to an optional meter.

This mechanical interface was then progressively developed, with one evolution being termed AI (Automatic Indexing) providing not only the selected aperture relative to the lens's maximum but also its absolute maximum aperture and its successor AI-s adding an AI-s conformity tab, a long lens indication tab, and making the aperture lever linear, explicitly allowing for camera-controlled partial closing of the iris.

With the launch of autofocus lenses, most of these mechanical elements were superseded by an electronic interface termed by Nikon "CPU", although the mechanical interface was kept for backwards compatibility, and later a limited range of manual focus AI-P lenses also containing a CPU was introduced. While the first Nikon autofocus camera using the CPU interface (the F-501 of 1985) retained full backward compatibility with AI and AI-s lenses, lower end consumer models – including the very next F-401 – removed all mechanical lens-to-camera interfaces introduced with AI and AI-s, except for the detection of the aperture ring being fully closed; even higher end cameras only kept the relative aperture sensor, allowing for only basic metering.

The launch of digital SLRs largely did not affect this two-tiered system, except for introducing in the D2H and newer AI-compatible models the ability to manually input the focal length and maximum aperture, therefore obtaining access to Matrix metering and display of the selected aperture: mass-market models still require CPU lenses to meter at all. Conversely, all Canon EF-mount cameras support stop-down metering even with lenses lacking the electronic interface, but require it for electronic focusing aids.

In both latter cases, the CPU-equipped lens has more functionality, prompting third parties to develop CPU retrofits.

== Naming ==
The name Dandelion (Russian: одуванчики, romanized: oduvanchik, lit. 'dandelion') originated from Viktor Lushnikov, the inventor of such chips, and became a de facto genericized trademark. Other manufacturers have since then been manufacturing comparable products; a commonly used generic name for these devices is autofocus confirmation chip.

== Limitations ==
Retrofit chips can only meaningfully provide static data to the camera as they lack encoder inputs, i.e. they cannot provide the currently focused distance or, for zoom lenses, the selected focal length.

In the Nikon system, any CPU lens is assumed to have a linearly actuated aperture lever: exposure inaccuracies can result if a pre-AI-s lens is converted and the camera is used to set the aperture.
