= Kiev 16U 16mm cine camera =

Soviet film camera series

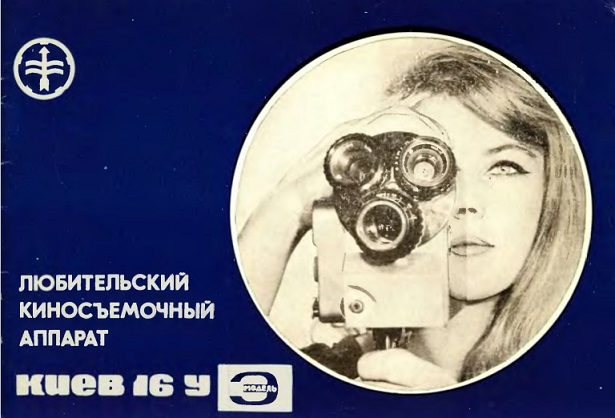
Kiev 16Ucine manual

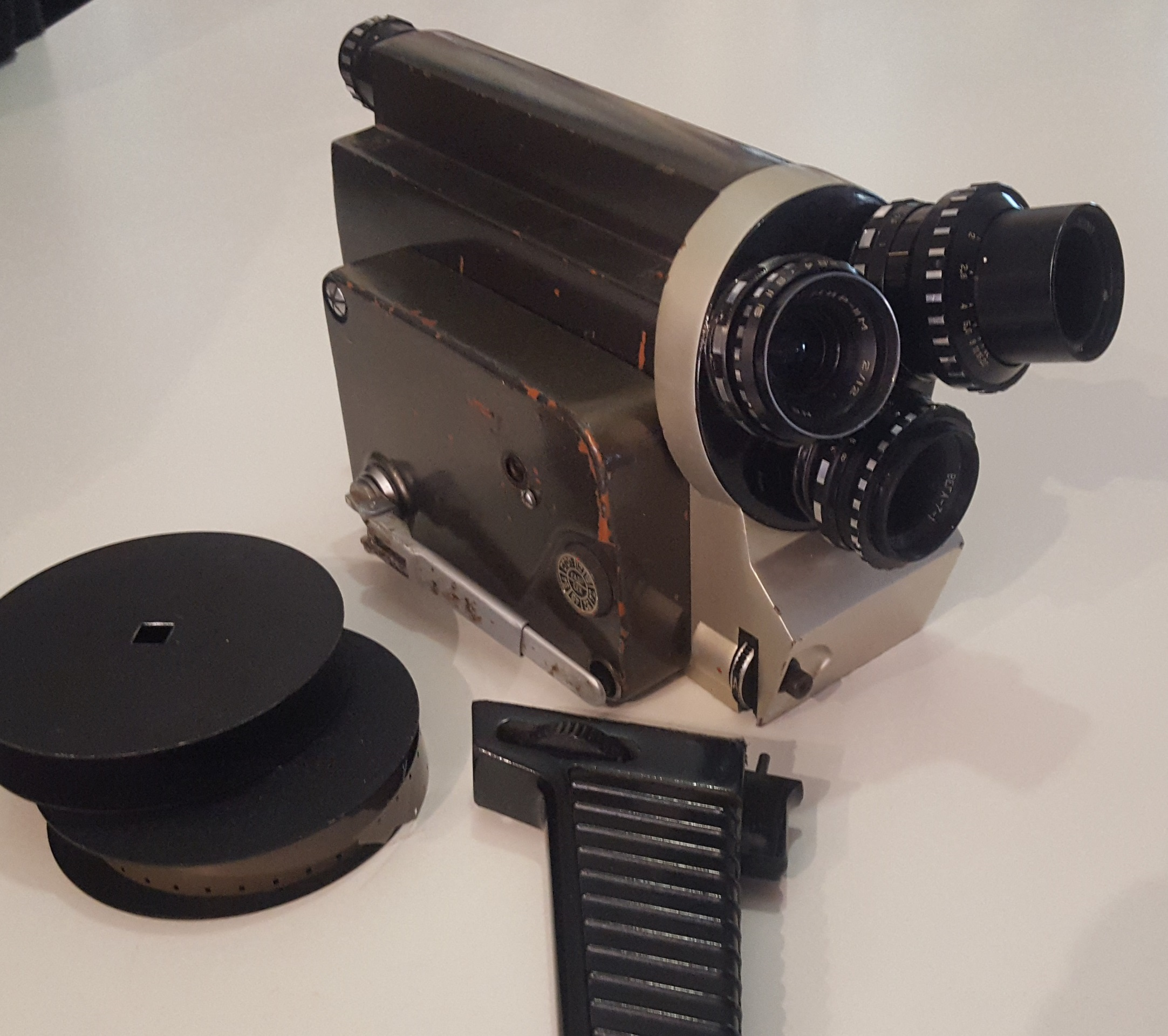
Kiev 16Ucine camera body

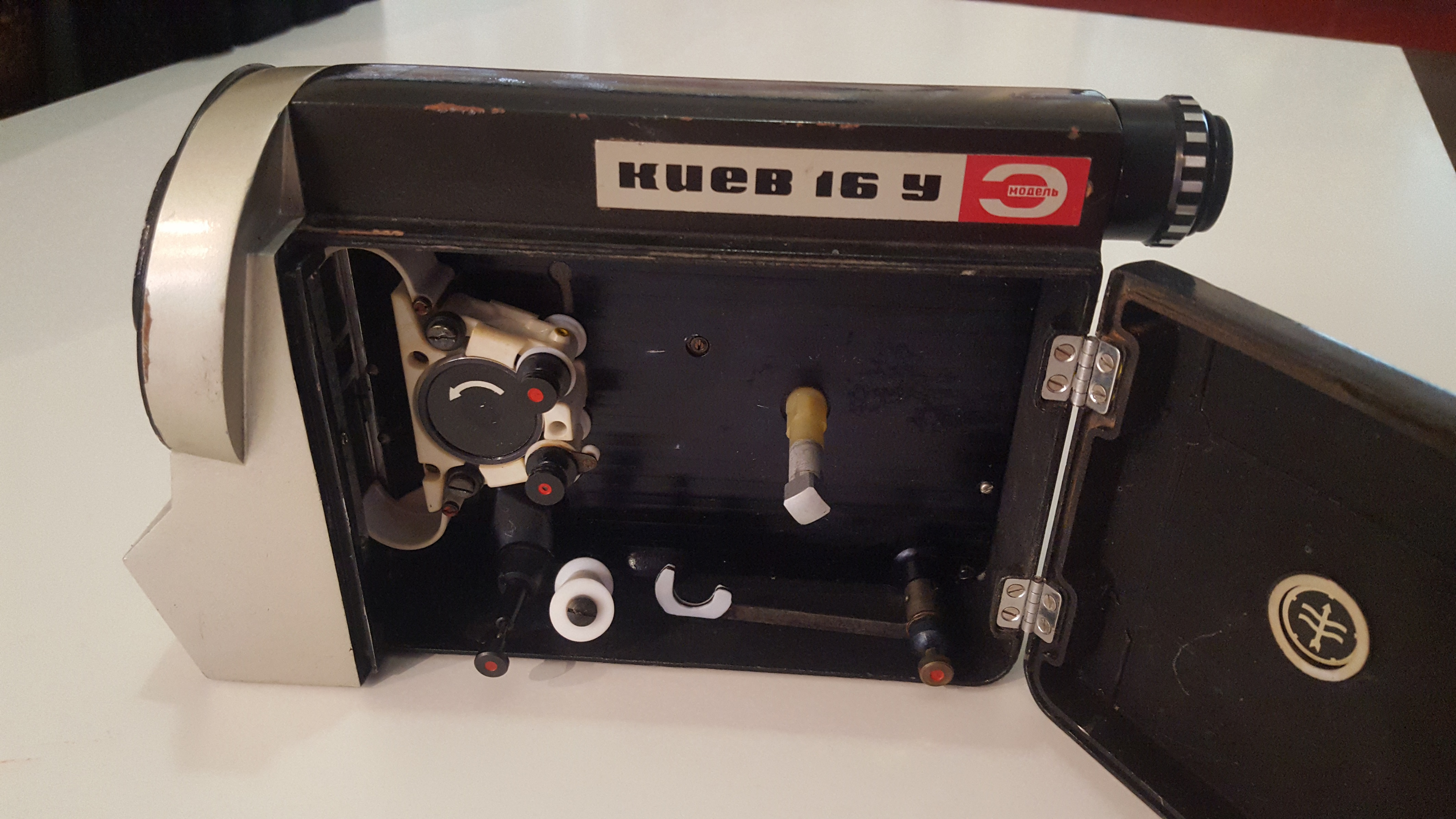
Detail of Kiev 16Ucine lens mount

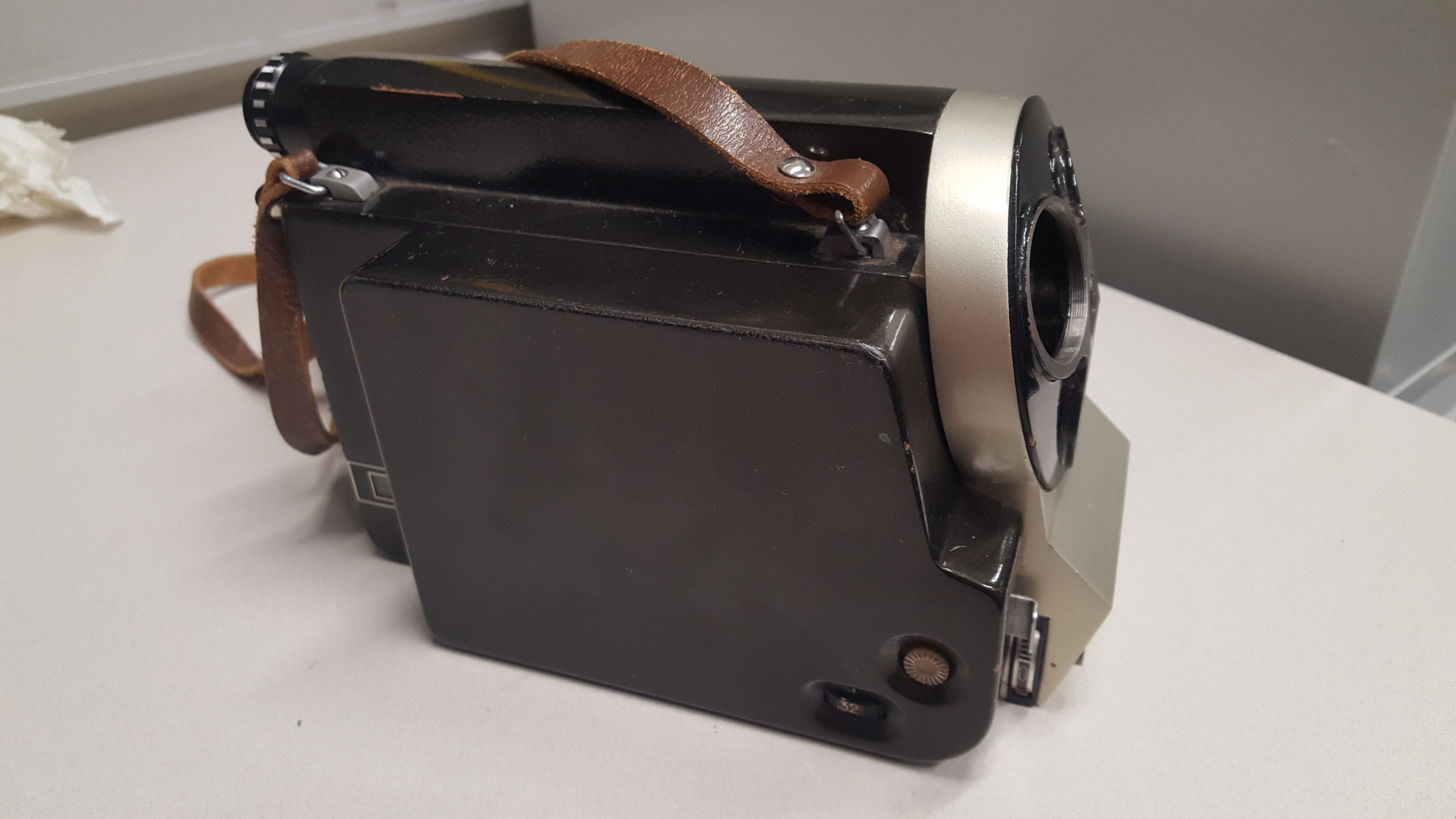
Kiev 16Ucine with electric drive

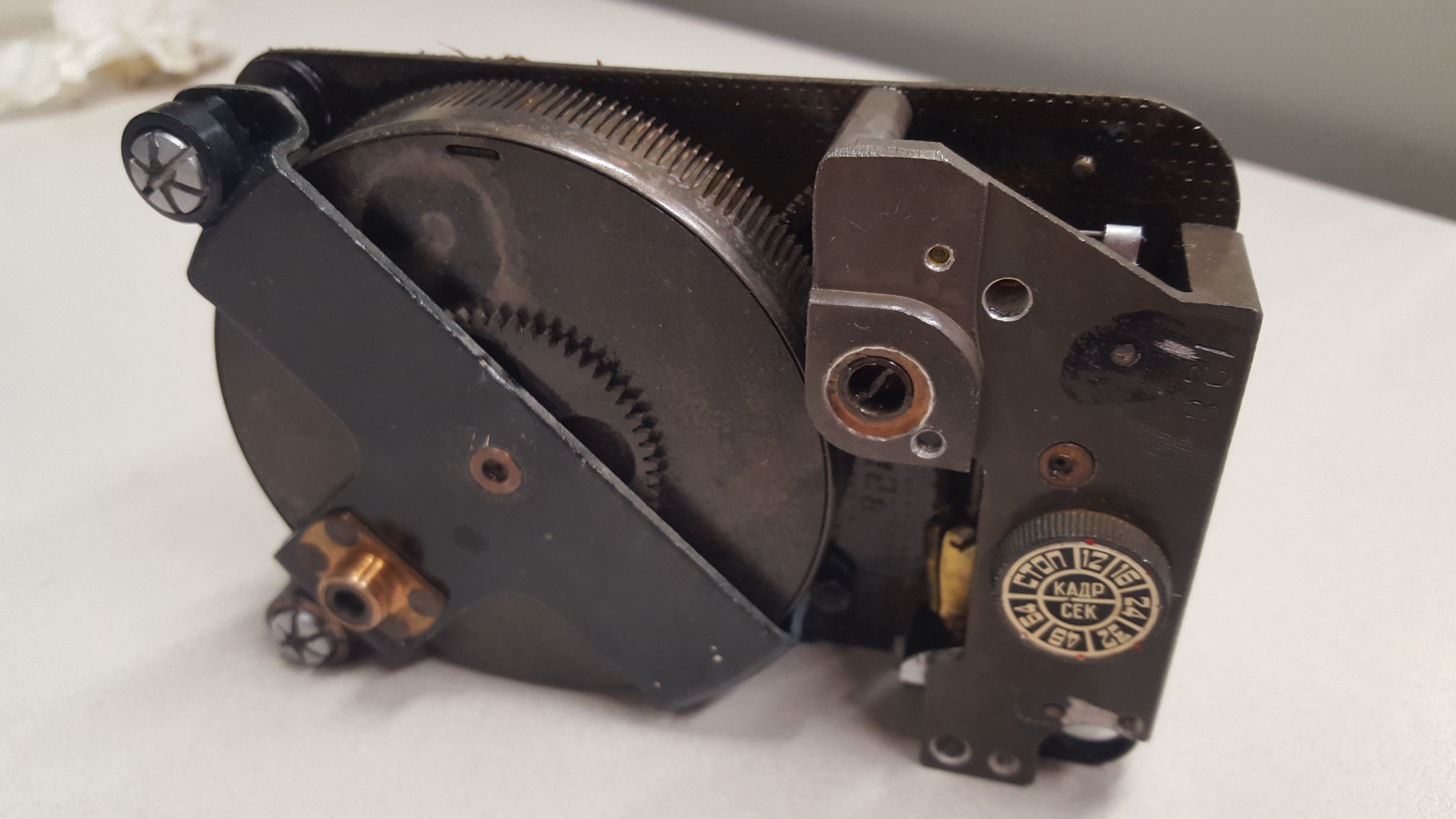
Internal mechanisms of the Kiev 16Ucine

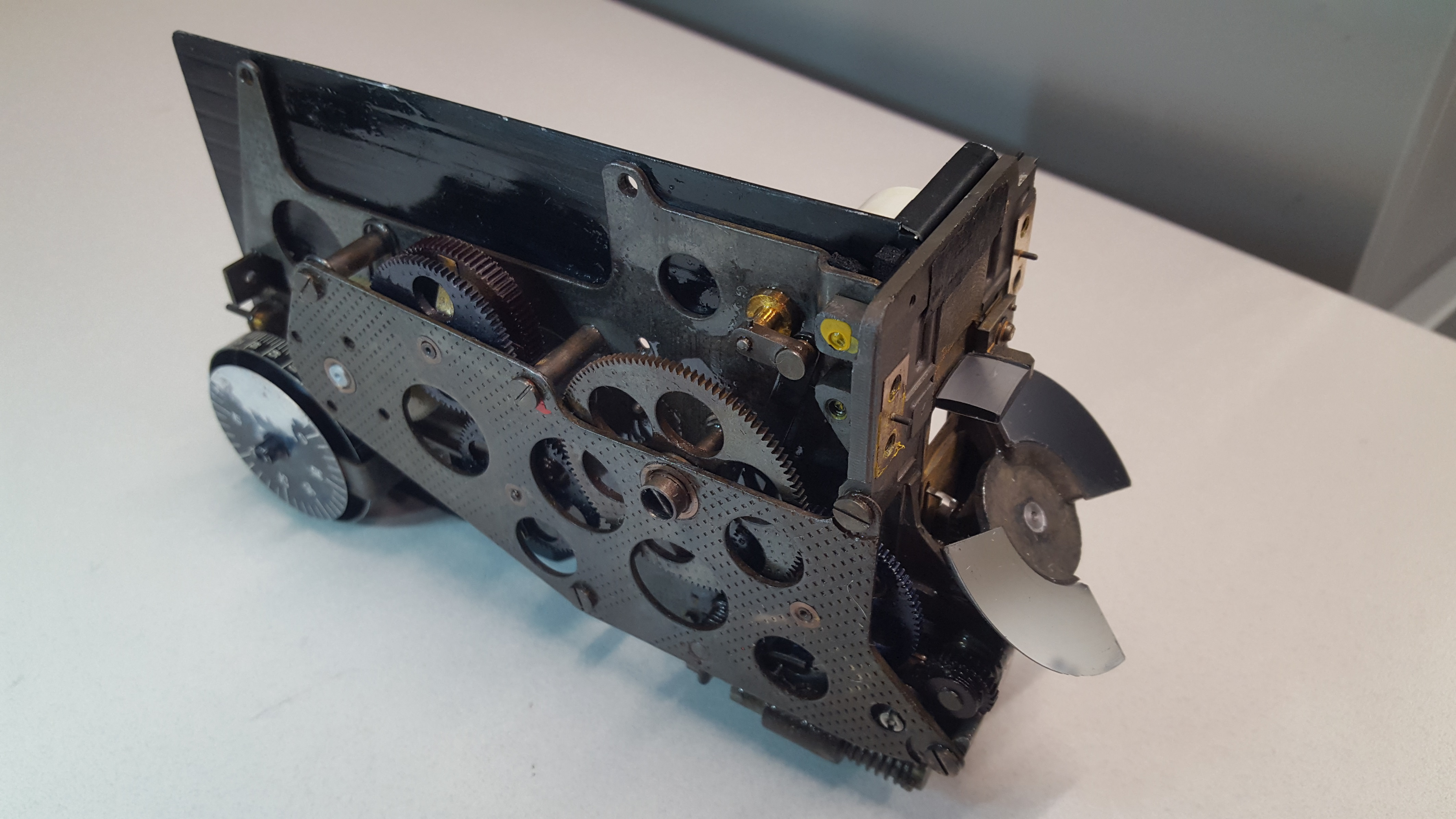
Oiled gears of the Kiev 16Ucine

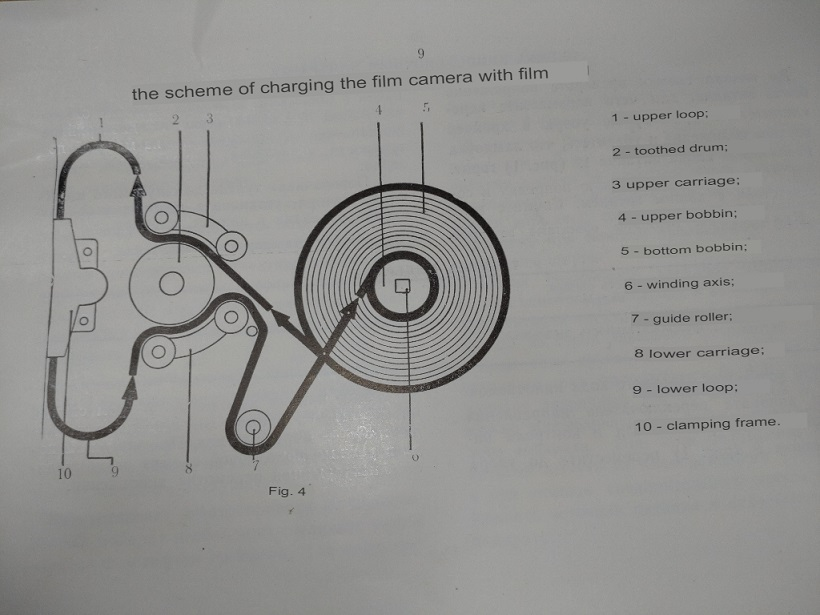
Kiev 16Ucine camera in operation

The Kiev 16U and 16UE series cine cameras are Soviet cameras made by Kiev that were made at the Automation Plant named after G.I. Petrovsky. In some instances, the manufacturer was designated as the Tochpribor factory. From the mid-1950s to the 1980s, the plant produced these 16mm film cameras mainly for professional use. The filming apparatus “Kiev-16U” was designed for filming a variety of subjects and in diverse conditions.

== Design ==
Constructed to work with 16mm film with either one-sided or two-sided perforation wound on a reel, the camera's reel capacity was designed to handle 30m or 100ft of film. The camera is equipped with a three-lens rotary turret which allowed for quick and easy switching between lenses.

== Specifications ==
The two main variants of the camera produced were the Kiev 16U and the Kiev 16UE. The main difference was their power source: the 16U was spring-wound with a detachable motor, while the 16UE was battery-powered with the same type of detachable motor. Both models feature a reflex viewfinder, allowing the operator to see the exact image that the film would capture.

Lenses provided with the camera included the Vega-7 (2/20mm), the Mir-11 (2 / 12.5mm), and the Tair-41 (2/50mm). The camera had a M32x0.5 thread for lens attachment.

Shooting speeds could be varied between 12, 16, 24, 32, 48, and 64 frames per second. The camera had a single-frame capability.

The camera was equipped with tripod screws and a pistol grip could be used for handheld shooting.

== Popularity ==
Though the Kiev 16mm cine cameras were not widely used outside of Russia and Eastern Europe, their lenses have been highly sought after since the early 2000s. The lenses are renowned for their unique optical characteristics that are attractive to both still photographers and filmmakers. In particular, they are known for their sharpness, colour rendition, and unique bokeh. The Kiev 16mm cine camera is a capable movie camera. The camera can produce high-quality film by modern standards.
