= Freedom to Learn =

Educational program

Freedom to Learn (FTL) is an education program in Michigan that helps schools create high performing, student-centered learning environments by providing each student and teacher with direct, consistent access to 21st century learning tools.

In 2002 the Michigan Legislature and governor dedicated state and federal (Title II, D) funds to a Demonstration Phase education project. Seeing the positive early results, the state expanded the program in 2004. Michigan allocated over $30 million to include over 23,000 students in 100 school districts and 191 buildings - primarily middle schools.

- Freedom to learn is also "the freedom of the learning generation." Leo Tolstoy wrote:

Don't be afraid ! There will be Latin and rhetoric, and they will exist in another hundred years, simply because the medicine is bought, so we must drink it (as a patient said). I doubt whether the thoughts which I have expressed perhaps indistinctly, awkwardly, inconclusively, will become generally accepted in another hundred years; it is not likely that within a hundred years all those ready-made institutions-schools, gymnasia, and universities -- will die, and that within that time there will grow freely formed institutions, having for their basis the freedom of the learning generation.

— "Education and Instruction," Leo Tolstoy, 1860.

== FTL goals ==
- Enhance student learning and achievement in core academic subjects with an emphasis on developing the knowledge and skills requisite to the establishment of a 21st-century workforce in Michigan.
- Provide greater access to equal educational opportunities statewide through ubiquitous access to technology.
- Foster effective use of the wireless technology through systematic professional development for teachers, administrators and staff.
- Empower parents and caregivers with the tools to become more involved in their child's education.
- Support innovative structural changes in participating schools and sharing of best practices among Program participants.

FTL provides training and resources to schools, utilizing a comprehensive evaluation to gauge program impact.

=== Education in a free society ===
- The ability to function in a free, democratic society as full participants in community affairs; a society where every citizen, regardless of age, color, religion, or belief, shows full respect for everyone else, treating all people as equals in all matters
- The ability to think creatively and meet new challenges
- Develop children into a responsible adult
- Help children to become flexible thinkers, to be confident in their ability to make decisions and to take responsibility for their own lives as well as for their communities.

== See also ==
- Sudbury Model of democratic schools
