= Infinity focus =

State in optics

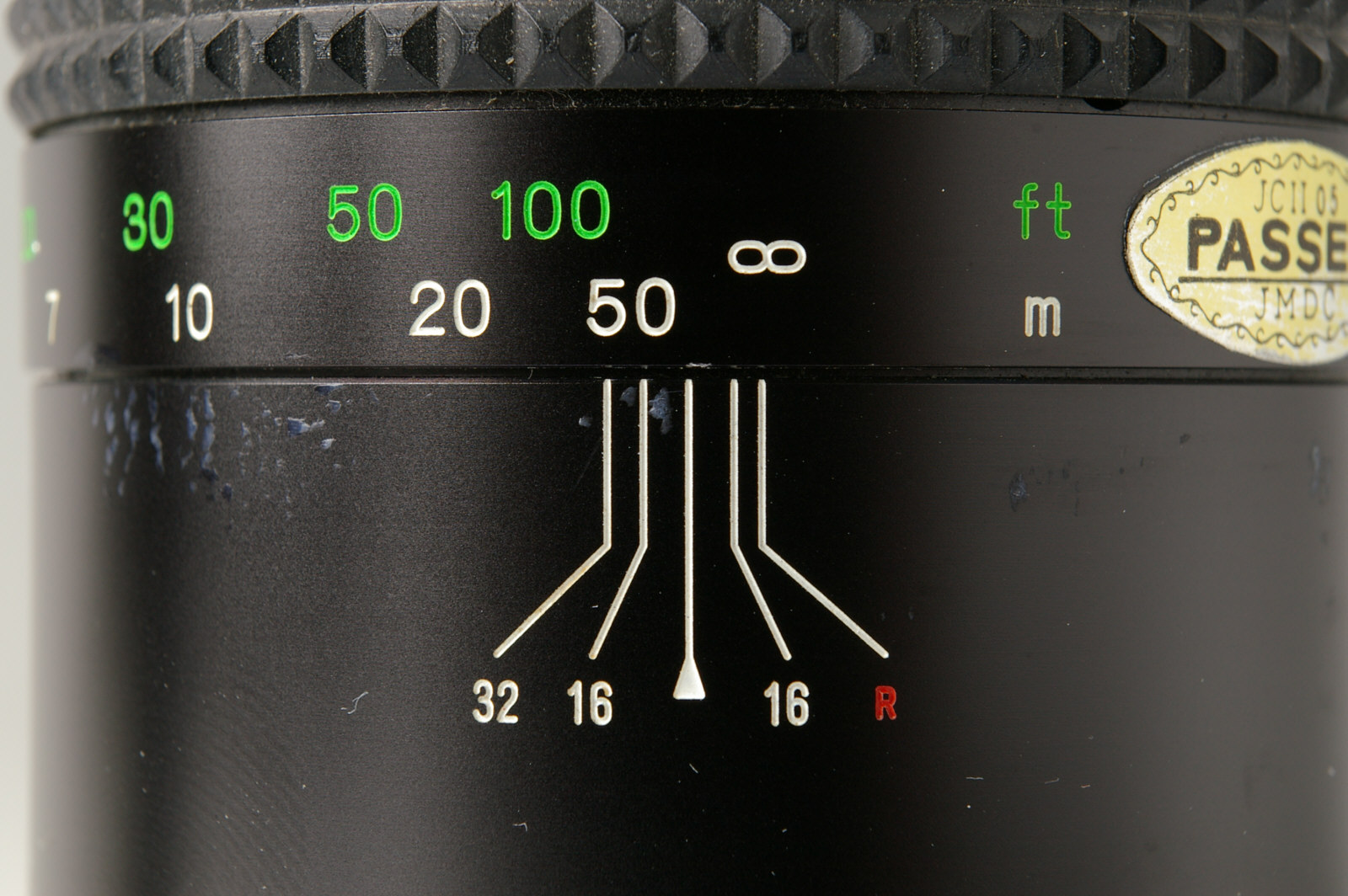
The infinity focus marked as ∞ on a Minolta lens

In optics and photography, infinity focus is the state where a lens or other optical system forms an image of an object an infinite distance away. This corresponds to the point of focus for parallel rays. The image is formed at the focal point of the lens.

In simple two lens systems such as a refractor telescope, the object at infinity forms an image at the focal point of the objective lens, which is subsequently magnified by the eyepiece. The magnification is equal to the focal length of the objective lens divided by the focal length of the eyepiece.

In practice, not all photographic lenses are capable of achieving infinity focus by design. A lens used with an adapter for close-up focusing, for example, may not be able to focus to infinity. Failure of the human eye to achieve infinity focus is diagnosed as myopia.

All optics are subject to manufacturing tolerances; even with perfect manufacture, optical trains experience thermal expansion. Focus mechanisms must accommodate part variations; even custom-built systems may have some means of adjustment. For example, telescopes such as the Mars Orbiter Camera, which are nominally set to infinity, have thermal controls. Deviations from its operating temperature are actively compensated to prevent shifts of focus.

== See also ==
- Hyperfocal distance
