= Beier (Beirette) =

German camera manufacturer

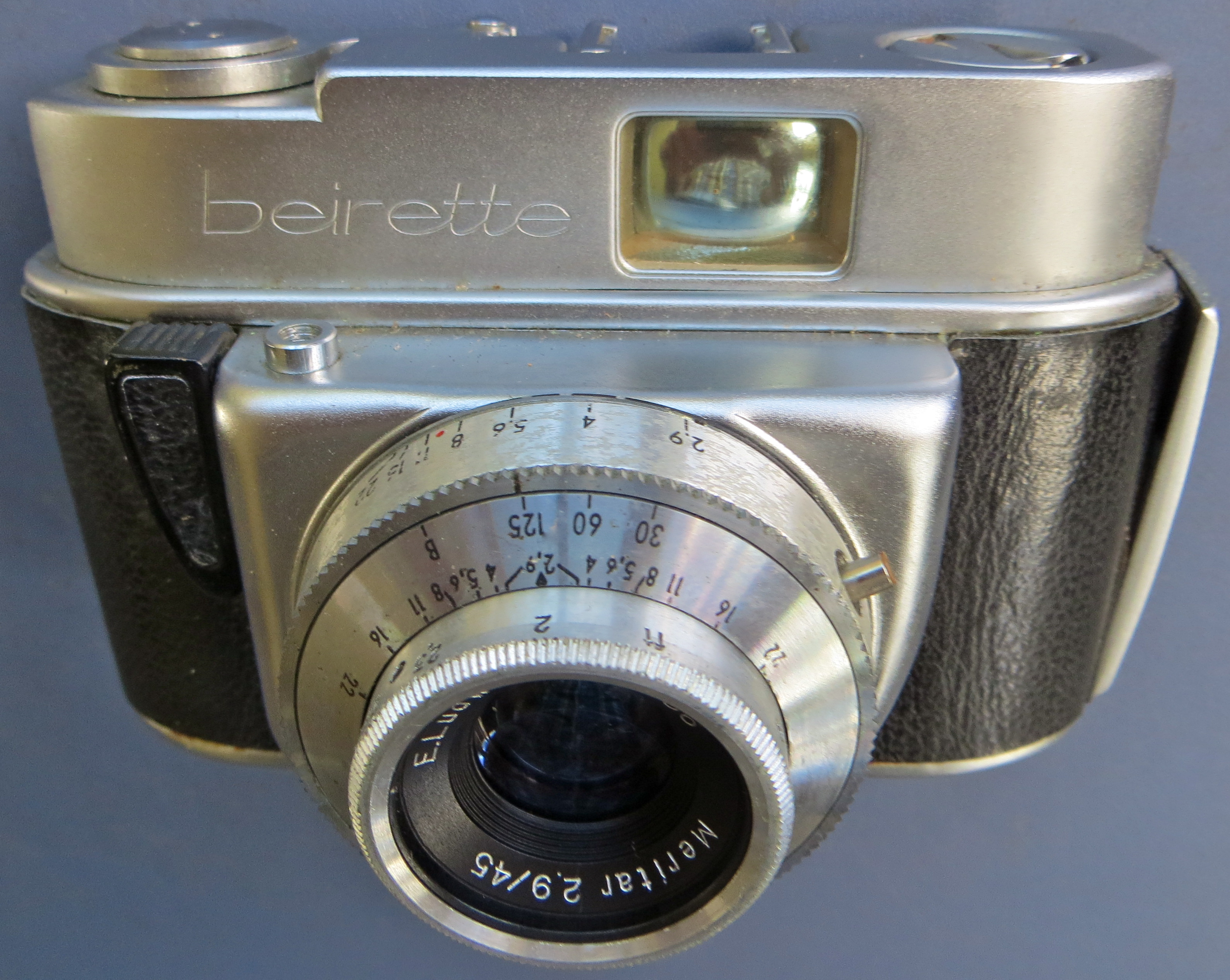
Boots Beirette 35mm camera 1964

Freitaler Kameraindustrie Beier & Co was an East German camera manufacturer from 1923 to 1989. Woldemar Beier (1886-1957) opened a camera factory in Freital on 1 April 1923, initially producing plate cameras of wood, then aluminium from 1929, 35mm cameras from 1932 and single lens reflex from 1938. In 1941 the factory converted to production of parts for bombers and submarines. In 1945, the machinery was moved to Ulyanovsk, but production resumed in Freital with a variety of small items such as potato peelers, pots and cigarette rolling machines. Camera production resumed in 1949. The company was part nationalised in 1959 and fully nationalised in 1972, when it was renamed VEB (citizens' own company). Beirette compact cameras were produced from 1958 to the 1989, when production became part of the Praktica range. Several versions were sold as the Boots Beirette.
