= Praktica IV =

Digital camera model

The Praktica IV is a 35mm SLR with M42 thread mount that was launched by Kamera-Werkstätten (KW) in 1959. The Praktica IV was based on the Praktina FX, and was actually the first Praktica to have a fixed pentaprism. It was the last model marketed by KW, before the company was bought by Pentacon.
