= EE2 =

EE2 may refer to:

- Empire Earth II, a 2005 video game
- Enemy Engaged 2, a 2007 video game
- Ethinylestradiol, a steroid hormone, also known as EE2
- Praktica EE 2, a camera
