= Praktiflex =

35mm SLR camera

Praktiflex, 1939
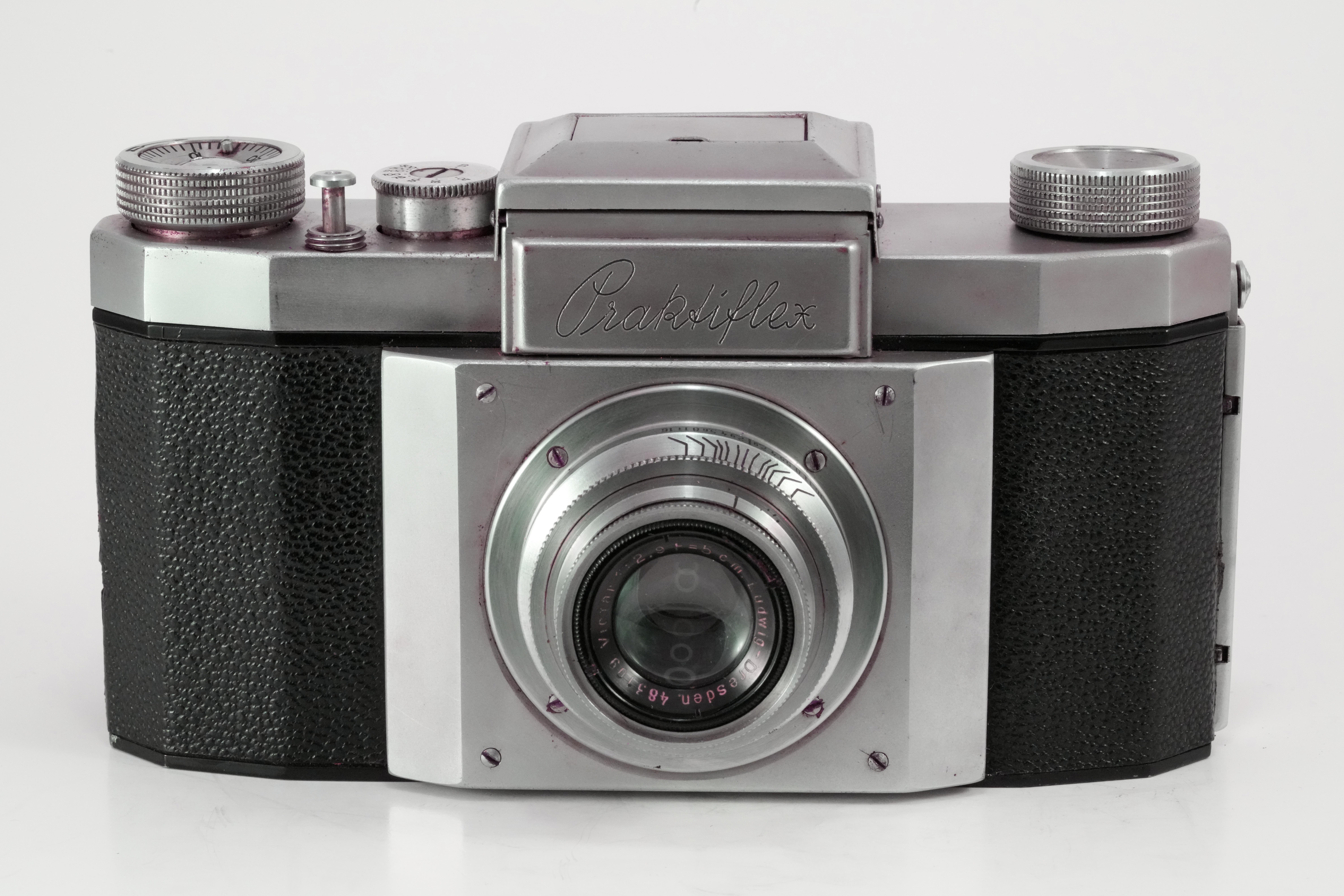

Overview
- Maker: Kamera-Werkstätten
- Type: 35mm SLR camera

Lens
- Lens mount: 40×1 mm thread

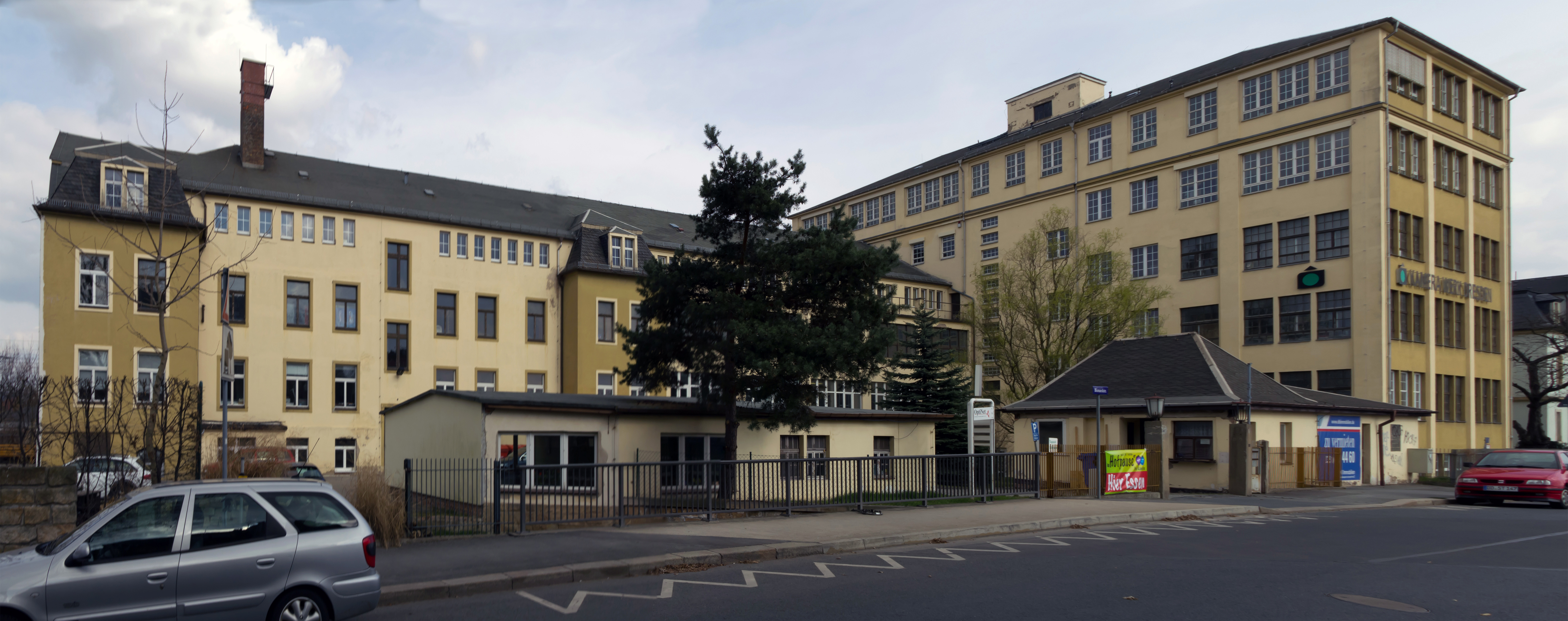
Kamera-Werke Niedersedlitz in 2011

Praktiflex was a 35 mm SLR camera produced by Kamera-Werkstätten Guthe & Thorsch (K.W.) in Dresden from 1939 to 1951.

KW was established 1919 in Dresden by Paul Guthe and Benno Thorsch, starting out manufacturing the Patent Etui plate camera. Ten years later came the roll film TLR Pilot Reflex and in 1936, the 6×6 SLR Pilot range. By that time, Benno Thorsch, the surviving partner from 1919, decided to immigrate to the United States and arranged with the US citizen Charles Noble to swap enterprises. Noble came to Germany and moved the factory to Niedersedlitz on the outskirts of Dresden, while Benno Thorsch in Detroit ran the acquired photo finishing business that was one of the largest in the USA. The new Kamera-Werkstätten AG, Niedersedlitz prospered, and in 1939 launched the 35mm SLR camera. The concept proved successful, and through continuous development, the Praktica name became one of the most popular 35mm SLR brands for several decades, beginning in the 1950s.

Praktiflex c. 1940
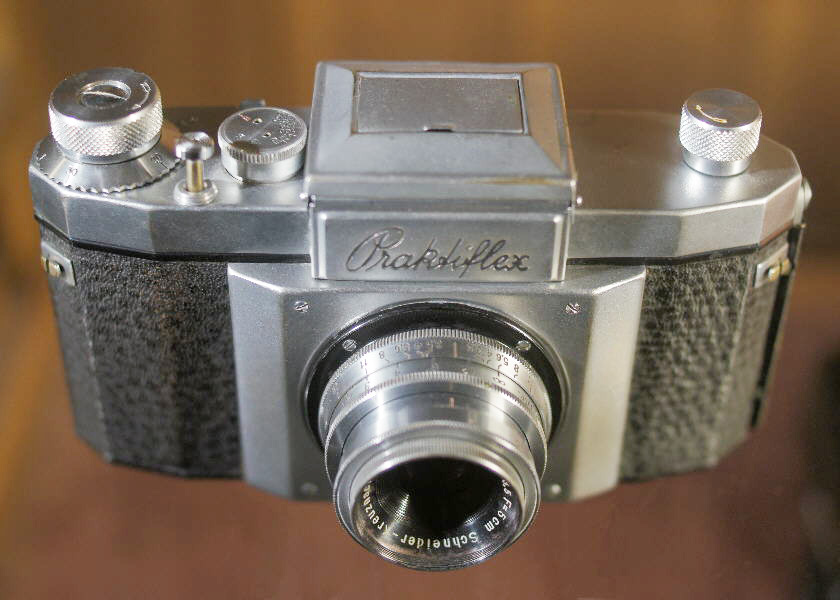

Overview
- Maker: Kamera-Werkstätten
- Type: 35mm SLR camera

Lens
- Lens mount: 40×1 mm thread

Praktiflex 1st generation
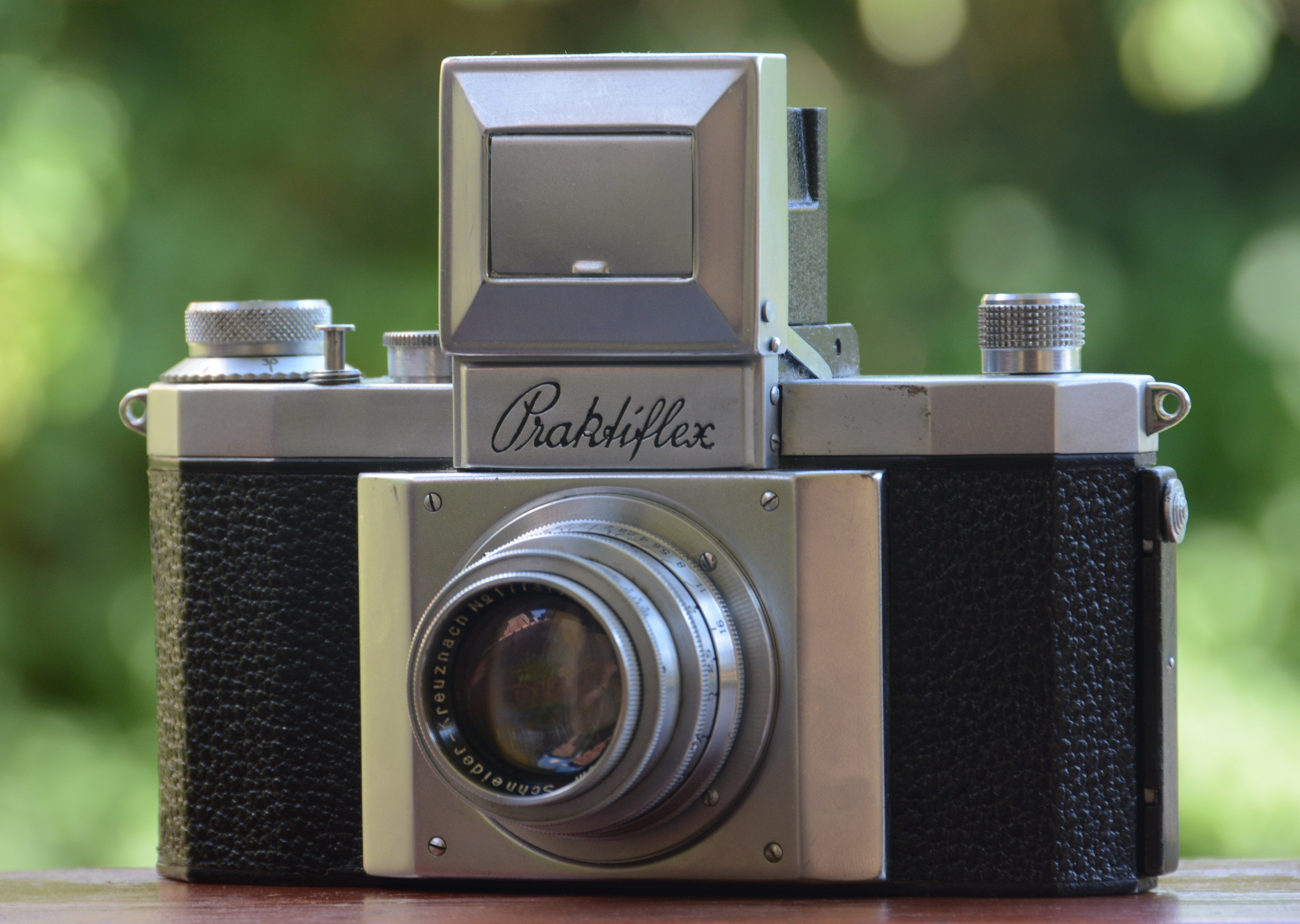

Overview
- Maker: Kamera-Werkstätten
- Type: 35mm SLR camera

Lens
- Lens mount: 40×1 mm thread

== The camera ==
The Praktiflex 35mm SLR film camera was launched in 1939 by the Kamera-Werkstätten AG, Dresden-Niedersedlitz. Despite being quite crude, the design constitutes the pattern along which virtually every subsequent 35mm SLR camera is built, regardless of place of origin. The highly regarded 35mm SLR Kine Exakta, by Ihagee in Dresden, that preceded it by some three years, is extremely complicated by comparison, and although it provides the same functions, is quite differently built. The Praktiflex has a 40mm screw lens mount, while the later Praktica models, after World War II when the factory was part of the VEB Pentacon, uses the 42mm screw mount. The Praktiflex has one feature inherited from the large format plate SLR cameras that otherwise was unsolved in the 35mm SLR cameras until 1954; the instant return mirror is lifted by the power of the finger depressing the shutter release, and it returns when the finger pressure is released. The button, with a rather long travel, is placed at the right-hand camera top plate. The slanted script is embossed in the name plate in front of the collapsible waist-level finder. The principal designers were presumably Benno Thorsch and Charles A. Noble.

== Variants ==
Several finishes and improvements were implemented in the course of the production period of the Praktiflex, which was from 1939 to 1949, but probably disrupted at times between 1941 and 1946. Some variations concern the colour schemes while others the mechanical details:

- The early 1939 cameras have no strap lugs, and large knobs with a frame counter on top of the wind-on knob. Soon the frame counter was placed under wind-on knob. The name on the front plate was at first in a Gothic style, while all later cameras have the characteristic slanted script name plate.
- In 1940 the rewind knob becomes smaller - Ø21 mm, while the wind-on knob is Ø27 mm. Cameras with brown, dark brown, red and possibly dark green leather covering are alternatives to the black leather, some have grey or black metal finish. Flat patent carrying strap fixtures are introduced.
- In 1941 ordinary strap lugs on either side of the body.
- In 1946 only black leather and black metal finish with name filled in white enamel.
- In 1947 black and chrome camera with large wind on knob with frame counter on the top.

Praktiflex 2nd generation
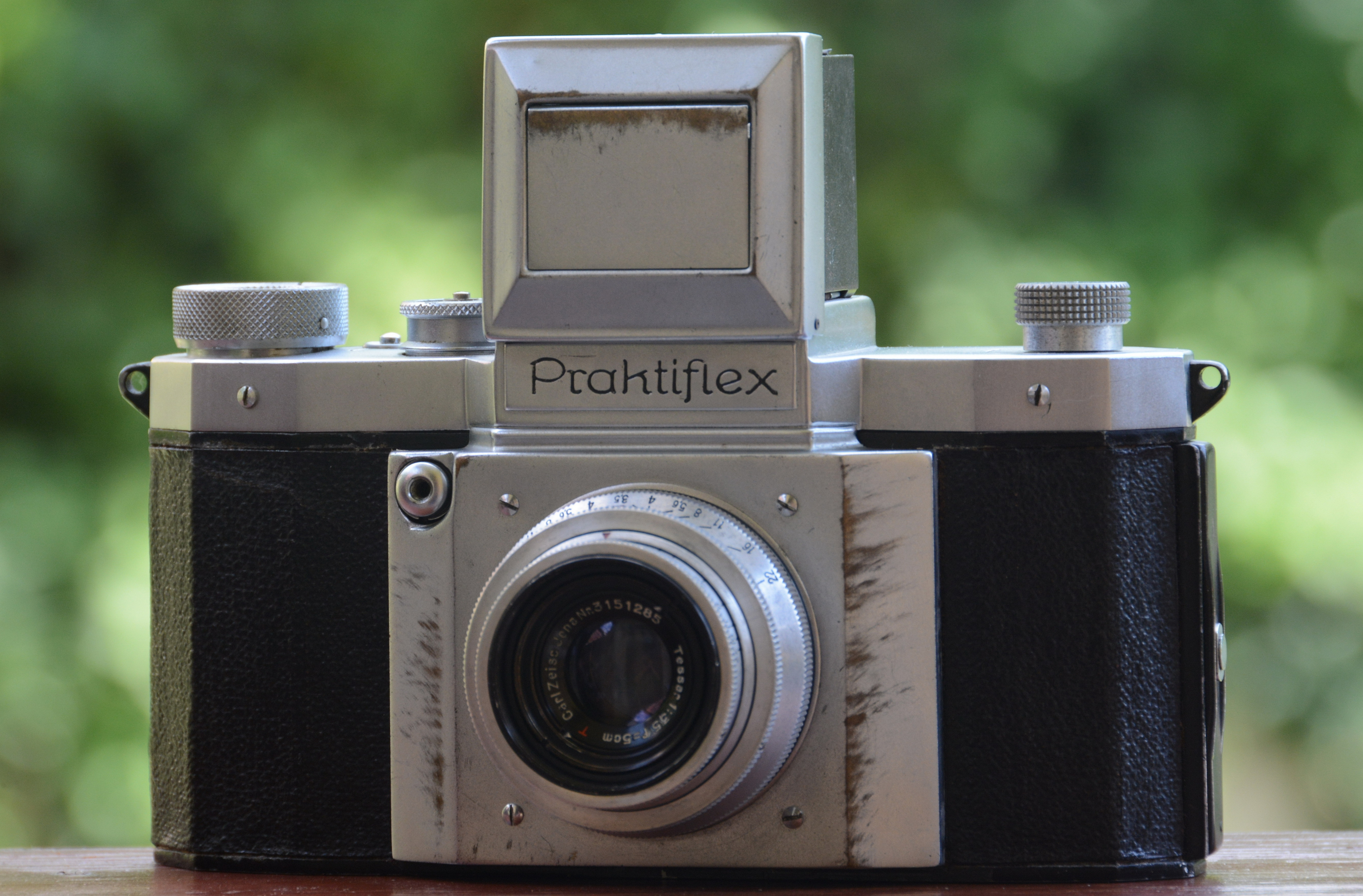

Overview
- Maker: Kamera-Werkstätten
- Type: 35mm SLR camera

Lens
- Lens mount: 40×1 mm thread

== Later models ==
In 1947 an improved Praktiflex version was launched with a new internal mechanism and a shutter release at the front that releases a spring-loaded mirror, which does not return until the camera is wound-on for the next frame. The name is embossed in gothic letters, otherwise the external body features is quite similar to those of the original model. This version is known as the Praktiflex II by collectors. The lens mount is at first the 40mm screw, but later cameras have the new 42mm lens mount, first used on the Contax S and the Praktica of 1949, since production lasted until 1951.

== Lenses ==
Only a small selection of standard lenses became available, e.g.:

- Schneider-Kreuznach Xenar f:3.5 F = 5 cm
- Schneider-Kreuznach Xenar f:2.8 F = 5 cm
- Schneider-Kreuznach Xenon f:2 F = 5 cm
- > Victar < 1:2.9 F = 5 cm *Anastigmatic
- Carl Zeiss Tessar 1:3.5 f = 5 cm
- Carl Zeiss Tessar 1:2.8 f = 5 cm
- Carl Zeiss Biotar 1:2 f = 5 cm
- SOM Berthiot Flor 1:1,5 f = 55 mm
