= Helios (lens) =

Brand of camera lenses

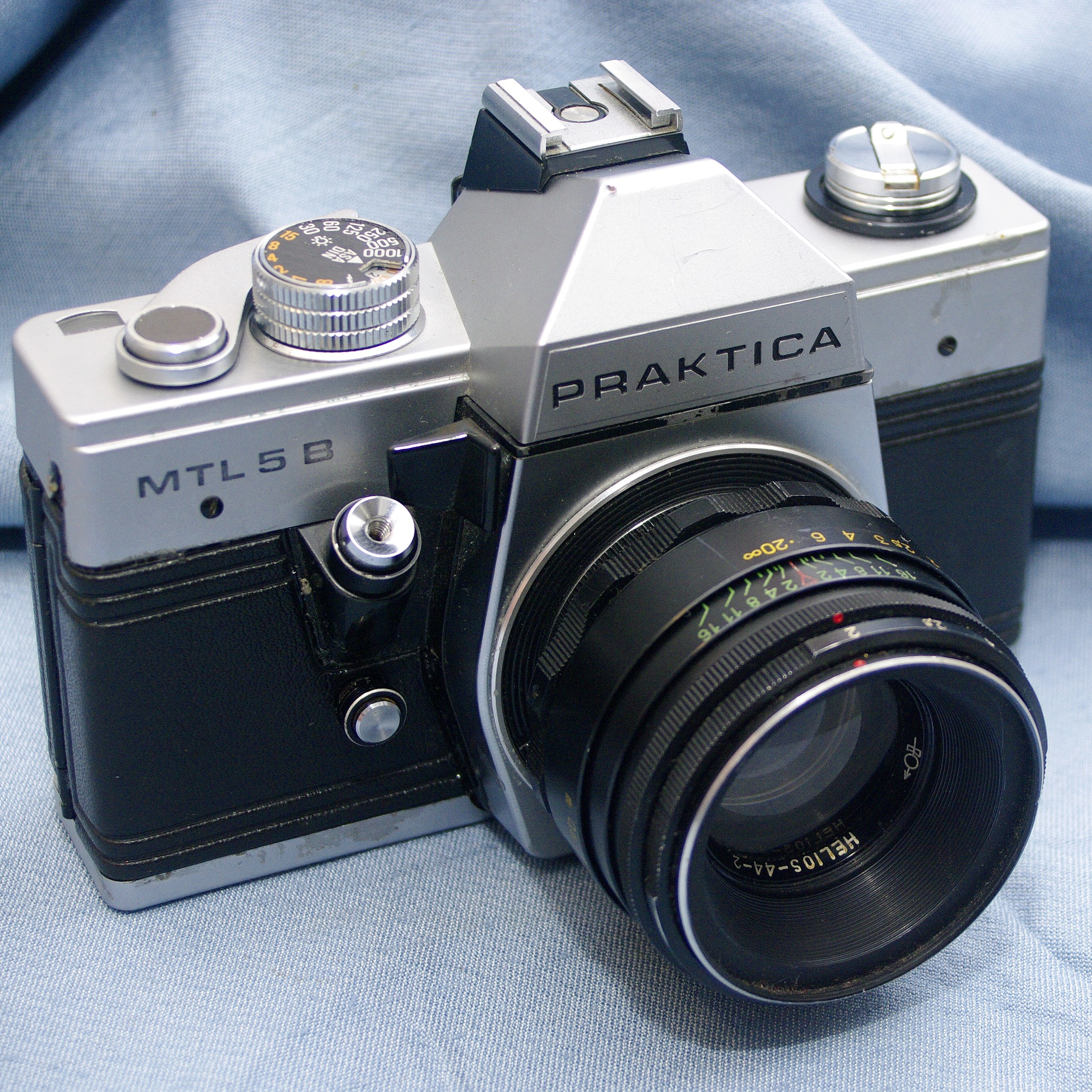
Helios-44-2 lens mounted on a Praktica MTL 5B

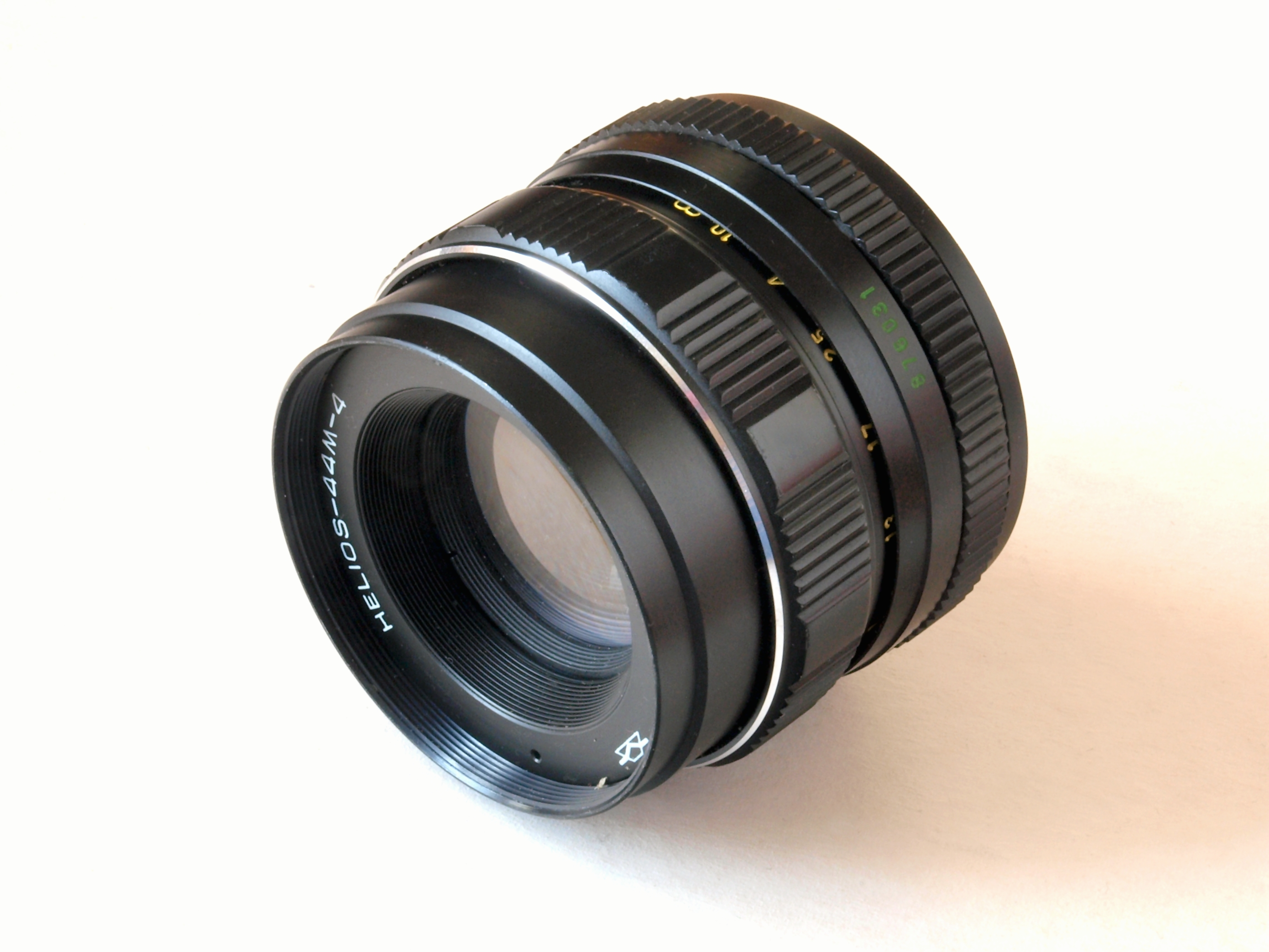
Helios-44M-4 lens, 58mm f/2, in M42 screw mount

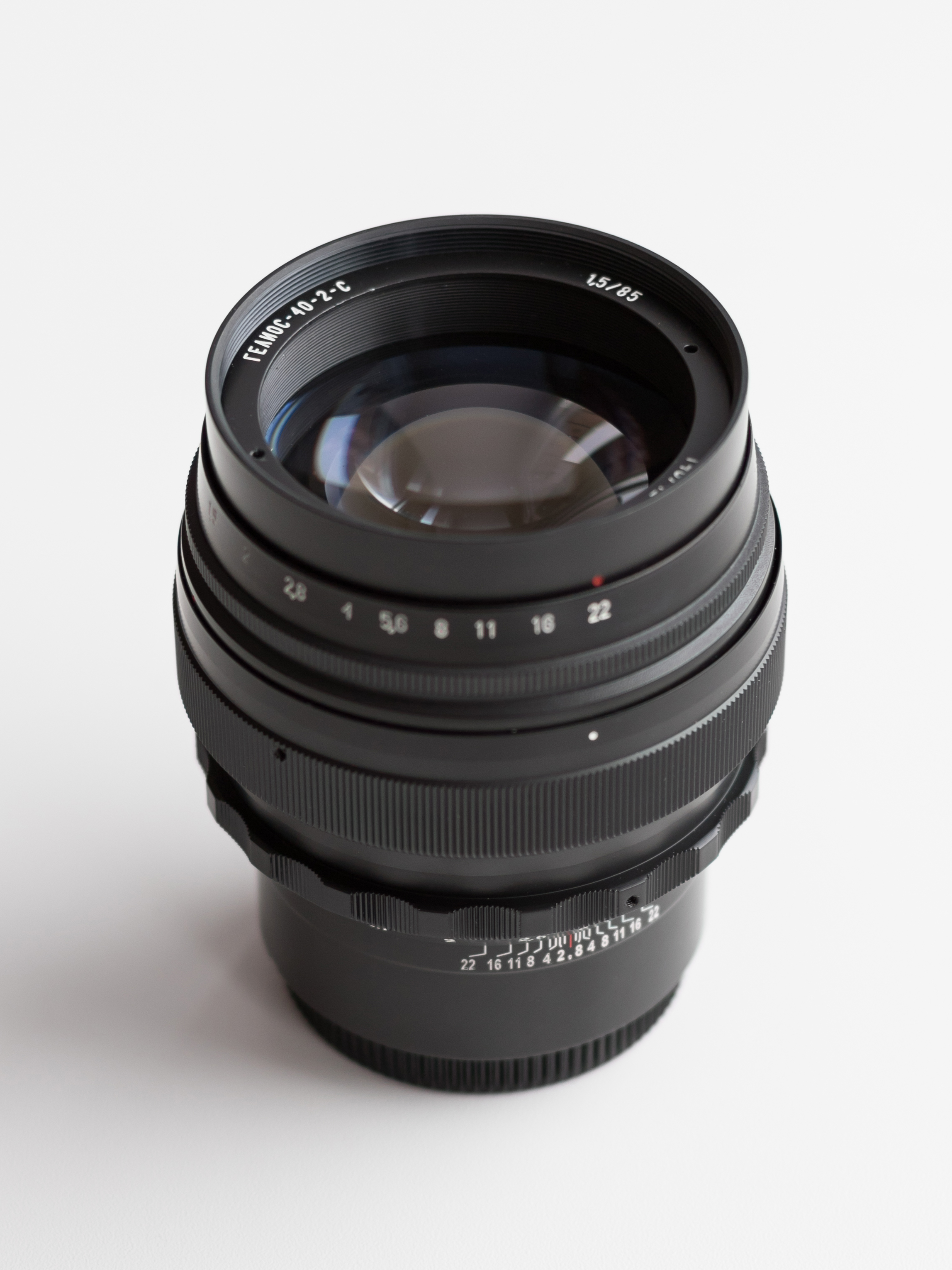
Helios-40-2

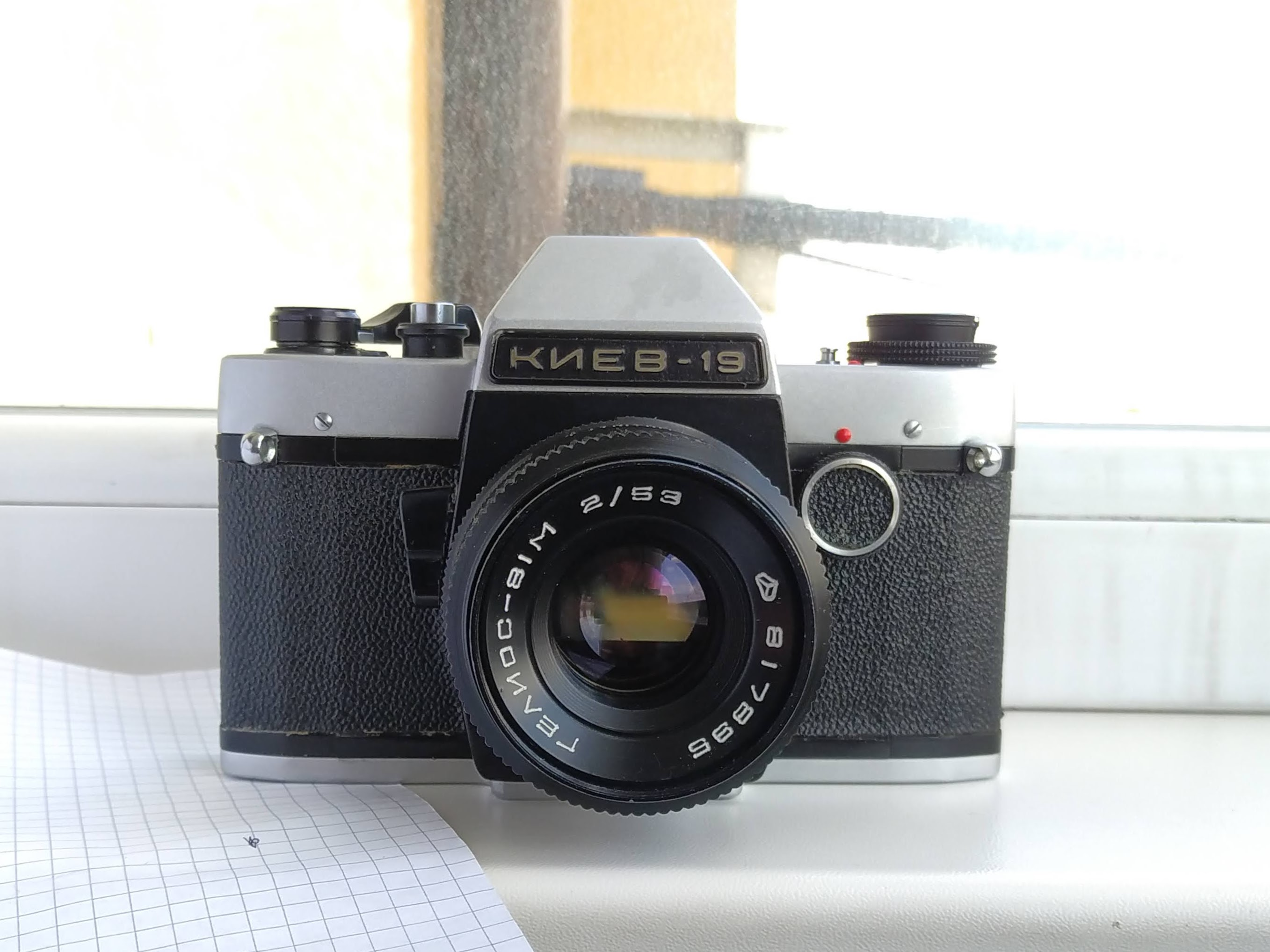
Helios-81M 53mm f/2 lens mounted on Kiev 19

Helios (Russian: Ге́лиос) was a type of camera lenses, made in the USSR. They were usually supplied with Zenit cameras and thus usable with other M42 lens mount cameras such as the Pentax Spotmatic. Some later Helios models were built also for the Pentax K mount.

== History ==
The Helios-44 and Helios-40 are derivatives of the Carl Zeiss Biotar optical formula. As all lenses based on the Biotar formula, the Helios-44 and Helios-40 produce an unusual "swirly" bokeh effect to the out-of-focus background. The bokeh "circles" become more elliptical in shape as you move away from the center of the photo. This optical phenomenon gives images rendered by these vintage lenses a distinct character, which has created a cult following among fine art photographers. The first Helios-44 was equipped with a Start reflex camera, starting in 1958. The lens had a unique bayonet mount optics, "jumping" diaphragm and 13 aperture blades. The aperture control ring was placed on the back of the lens and switched in steps. The workmanship was of a very high standard. The second Helios-44 served as a standard lens for Zenit-3 SLR cameras in 1960-62. It already had a threaded mount for M39 optics and a classic layout of controls. It is often called White Helios. The third Helios-44 completely repeats the previous one, but the number of aperture blades was changed - they were reduced to 9. These lenses were equipped with Zenit-3M cameras in 1962-70. In the same 1962, the Helios-44 lens for the Start camera also reduced the number of petals to nine. In the late 60s, Helios-44 (m39) continued to be produced in Belarus at the BelOMO production association. At the same time, the chemical composition of the optics coating changed from violet to golden yellow. Interestingly, the lens was black and there are chrome stripes on the focus ring - by analogy with the German Carl Zeiss Jena. Therefore, these lenses are often called Helios-44 "Zebra". They completed Zenith-3M of the last years of production. The next step in the modernization was the transition from the M39 to M42 threaded mount due to the transition of SLR cameras to the M42 × 1 threaded connection with a working length of 45.5 mm, which corresponded to the threaded connection common in the world. The lens received a new name Helios-44-2, and the body became completely black. Production began in 1967 - this year Zenit-E switched to a threaded mount on the m42. Externally, the serial number began to be applied to the ring with the name.

In 1969, Helios-44-2 was mastered in Valdai. In design and appearance, the lens repeated the previous KMZ sample, but there was a decrease in build quality.

In 1972, the director of KMZ issued an order to increase the production of Helios-44-2 lenses in Valdai. The lens received a slightly modified lens block, the rear set of lenses was no longer twisted by the block and the lenses simply poured. The serial number was transferred to the lens body. In this form, the lens was assembled until the early 90s. In the early 80s, BelOMO began assembling Helios-44-2, it completely repeats the 1967 model - the rear group of lenses is unscrewed by a block. The blackening of the petals was done with a bluish paint. In 1980, multilayer MC coating was applied and the production of MC Helios-44M lenses began. It became the basis for the further release of the Helios-44-3 MS, which you will learn about a little further.

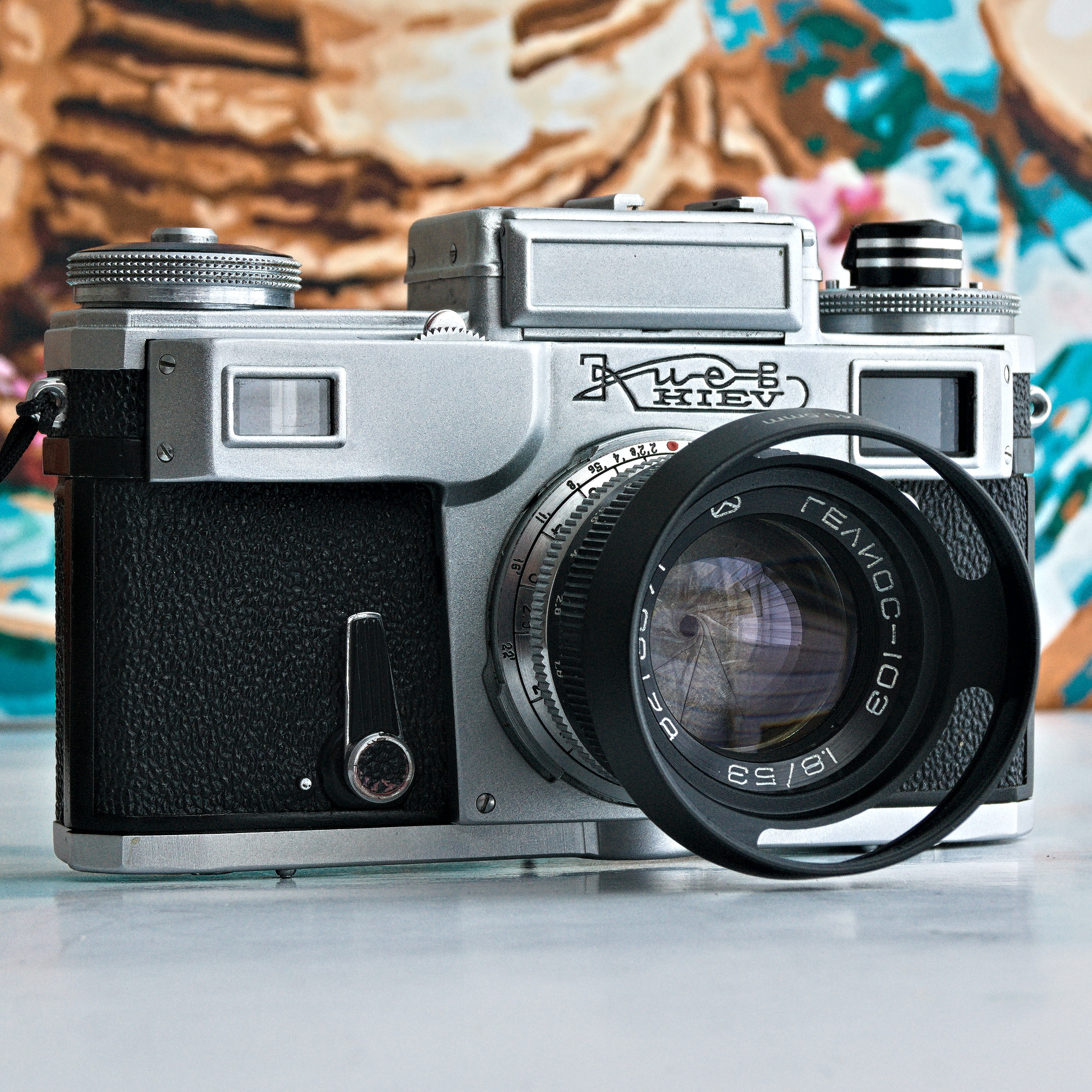
Helios-103 53 mm f/1.8 with lens hood mounted on Kiev 4M

In the early 80s the design of the jumping diaphragm mechanism has been upgraded to improve its reliability. Now the aperture control mode switch has disappeared from the lens barrel, which did not arouse the delight of amateur photographers. This innovation eliminated the use of a series of lenses with cameras without a diaphragm control mechanism (for example, ZENIT-E), in addition, shooting with simple extension rings became impossible, since the diaphragm did not work in manual mode. These lenses in the title received the digital index "4" - "Helios-44M-4". In 1992-93, the Belarusians released Helios-44-2 in a new building. The lens received the index MS Helios-44-3. The lens designed for the Zenit-7 camera was marked Helios-44-7. Due to the special aperture drive system (similar to Nikon SLR film cameras), it could only be installed on these cameras, it had a single-layer coating and an M42 × 1 mount. Helios-44D served as standard for the Zenit-D camera and had a bayonet mount to the camera. Helios-44M lenses have been produced at KMZ since 1971, and the main differences from the base model Helios-44 concern only the aperture control method, the number of aperture blades and the resolution of the lens: - Helios-44M has an 8-blade diaphragm; - Helios-44M has a jumping diaphragm device, unlike Helios-44, which has only manual control of the diaphragm with a preset ring; - Helios-44M has a M / A aperture control mode switch, the same as that of Zenitar-M 50 1.7; - the lenses have a different diameter of the front filter - 49mm versus 52mm for 44M. The Helios-44M-× line was transferred at the end of the 1980s to the Jupiter Valdai Plant, where lenses later began to be divided by resolution with the assignment of different indexes in ascending order: MC Helios-44M-4, MC Helios-44M-5, MC Helios-44M-6 and MC Helios-44M-7. Lenses have been recalculated to use multi-coated coatings, which improve the light transmission and color reproduction of the lens. The light transmission coefficient for versions 44M-4 and 44M-5 is 0.85, and for versions 44M-6 and 44M-7 it is 0.90.

== List of Helios lenses ==
Helios Lenses from KMZ (Note: Zenit Lens Catalog (in Russian))
Model	Mount	Focal Length	Maximum Aperture	Minimum Aperture
Helios-1		50mm	ƒ/2.0	
Helios-2	M42	45mm	ƒ/2.0	ƒ/16
Helios-3		100mm	ƒ/2.0	
Helios-23		35mm	ƒ/2.0	
Helios-27		135mm	ƒ/2.0	
Helios-29		25mm	ƒ/1.5	
Helios-31		40mm	ƒ/1.4	
Helios-32		15mm	ƒ/2.0	
Helios-33	M28	35mm	ƒ/2.0	ƒ/16
Helios-34		15mm	ƒ/4.0	
Helios-35		15mm	ƒ/1.5	
Helios-39		25mm	ƒ/4.0	
Helios-40	M39	85mm	ƒ/1.5	ƒ/22
Helios-40-2 (Note: The 40-2 is not truly a different optical formula, however its filter diameter was increased from 66mm to 67mm, and its tripod collar was made rotatable. This allows for easier mounting on some cameras. Reflective coatings have also been changed.)	M42	85mm	ƒ/1.5	ƒ/22
Helios-41		150mm	ƒ/2.0	
Helios-42		27mm	ƒ/2.8	
Helios-43		19mm	ƒ/1.5	
Helios-44 (Note: There have been many variants of the Helios-44 produced since its inception.)	M42, K	58mm	ƒ/2.0	ƒ/16
Helios-49		75mm	ƒ/1.5	
Helios-50		100mm	ƒ/1.5	
Helios-51		200mm	ƒ/1.5	
Helios-52		150mm	ƒ/1.5	
Helios-53	M42	200mm	ƒ/2.5	ƒ/16
Helios-54		135mm	ƒ/2.0	
Helios-55		200mm	ƒ/2.5	
Helios-57		9mm	ƒ/3.5	
Helios-58		10mm	ƒ/1.6	
Helios-61		80mm	ƒ/2.5	
Helios-62		29mm	ƒ/1.8	
Helios-64		44mm	ƒ/1.8	
Helios-65	M42	52mm	ƒ/2.0	ƒ/22
Helios-66		10mm	ƒ/3.5	
Helios-67		200mm	ƒ/1.5	
Helios-68		200mm	ƒ/1.5	
Helios-70	M42, K	52mm	ƒ/1.9	ƒ/16
Helios-76		35mm	ƒ/2.0	
Helios-77		75mm	ƒ/2.0	
Helios-77M	M42, K	52mm	ƒ/1.8	ƒ/16
Helios-77M-4	M42, K	50mm	ƒ/1.8	ƒ/16
Helios-79		45mm	ƒ/2.0	
Helios-81	F	52mm	ƒ/2.0	ƒ/16
Helios-85	M42	85mm	ƒ/2.0	ƒ/16
Helios-88	M42	50mm	ƒ/1.9	ƒ/16
Helios-89		30mm	ƒ/1.9	ƒ/16
Helios-94	Contax-Kiev (external bayonet)	50mm	ƒ/1.8	ƒ/16
Helios-97	M42	52mm	ƒ/2.0	ƒ/16
Helios-98	M42	28mm	ƒ/2.8	ƒ/16
Helios-101	M42	52mm	ƒ/1.8	ƒ/16
Helios-103	Contax-Kiev	53mm	ƒ/1.8	ƒ/22
Helios-107	M42	65mm	ƒ/2.8	ƒ/22
Helios-113	M	40mm	ƒ/1.8	
Helios-123		50mm	ƒ/1.4	

Additionally, some lenses were made by Japanese manufacturers and badged as Helios for import to Britain and the Netherlands. They were sold by TOE, the main importer of Russian photographic equipment, if there was no exact equivalent currently available from Russian sources. The most common examples are 28mm f2.8 and 135mm f2.8 auto-stopdown M42 lens, probably manufactured by Chinon.
