= Praktica =

Brand of camera by Pentacon

PRAKTICA
- Website: praktica.com

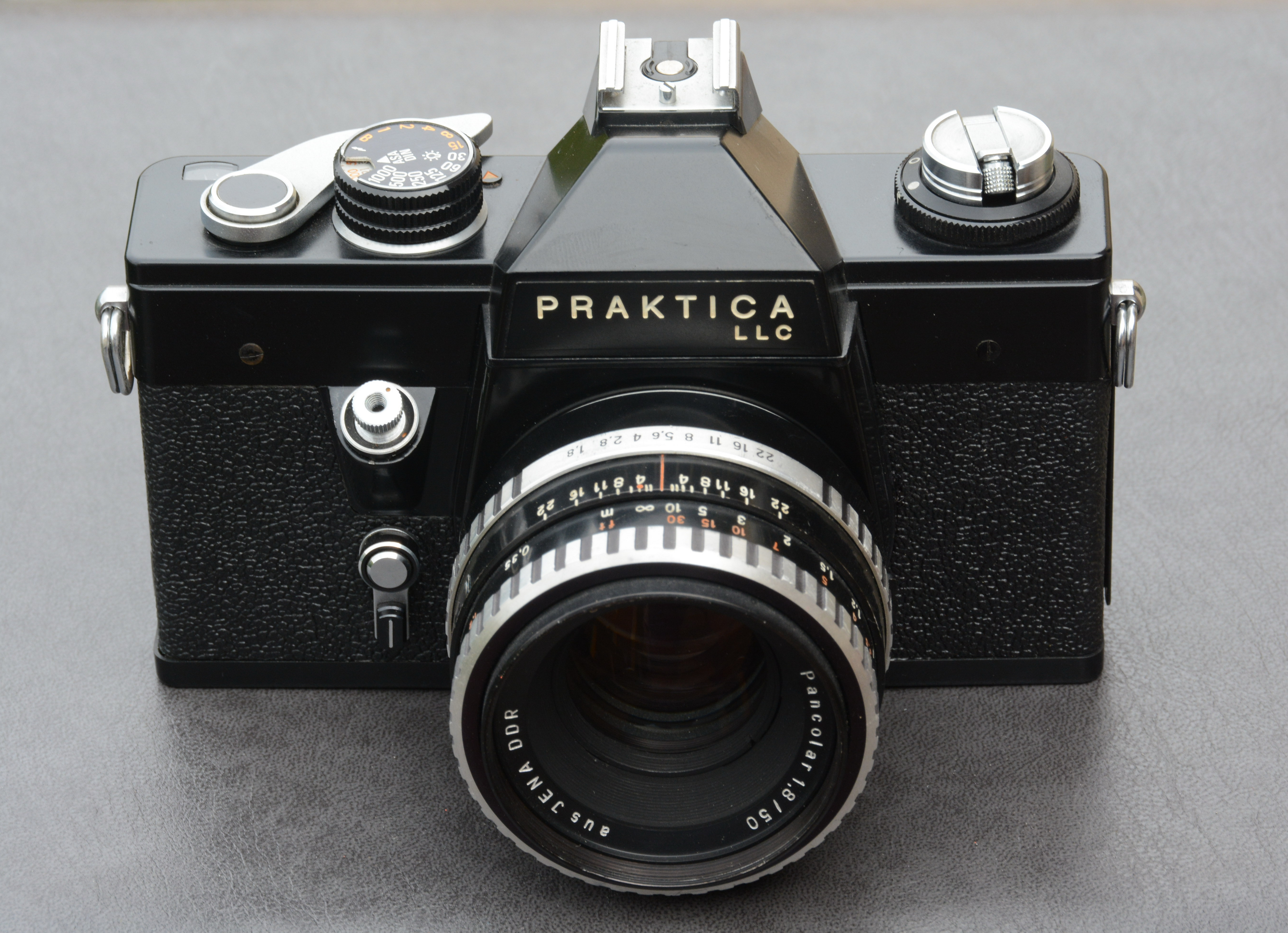
Praktica LLC with Pancolar 1.8/50 lens, the first 35 mm single-lens reflex camera with electrical diaphragm simulation between interchangeable lenses and camera body (1969)

Praktica was a brand of camera manufactured by Pentacon in Dresden in eastern Germany, within the GDR between 1949 and the German reunification in 1990. The firm Pentacon was divided in mainly two parts and sold after German reunification. Schneider Kreuznach and Noble bought parts of it.

Pentacon is a Dresden-based company in the optical and precision engineering industry, which was at times a major manufacturer of photo cameras. The name Pentacon is derived on the one hand from the Contax brand of the Dresden Zeiss Ikon Kamerawerke and Pentagon (Greek for pentagon), because a pentaprism for SLR cameras developed for the first time in Dresden has this shape in cross section.

Today's PENTACON GmbH Foto- und Feinwerktechnik is still based in Dresden. It is part of the Schneider Group, Bad Kreuznach. Pentacon is the modern-day successor to Dresden camera firms such as Zeiss Ikon; for many years Dresden was the world's largest producer of cameras. Previous brands of the predecessor firms included Praktica, Exa, Pentacon, Zeiss Ikon, Contax (now owned by the Carl Zeiss company), Ica, Ernemann, Exakta, Praktiflex, and many more.

Among the innovative legacies of the predecessor firms are the roll film SLR camera in 1933, the 35mm SLR in 1936, and the pentaprism SLR in 1949. After WWII the company's products were best known in the Eastern Bloc countries, though some were exported to the west. They currently produce both budget lenses (mostly small, not very durable, and having manual focus, but good in optical quality) and higher priced products. They also produce optical equipment for the space programs of the US, Western Europe, and Russia.

In 2001, the production of Praktica Analogue SLR cameras was discontinued with the focus shifting to a range of Praktica digital compact cameras and camcorders together with an extensive range of binoculars, spotting scopes, accessories and other optical imaging products.

Praktica today produces many products under various brands such as auto industry products, 3D LCD screens, and still cameras and lenses under their own Praktica brand and also more known international brands. Since September 2015, the owner of the Praktica brand has been Praktica Ltd, a UK limited company.

== Older company history ==
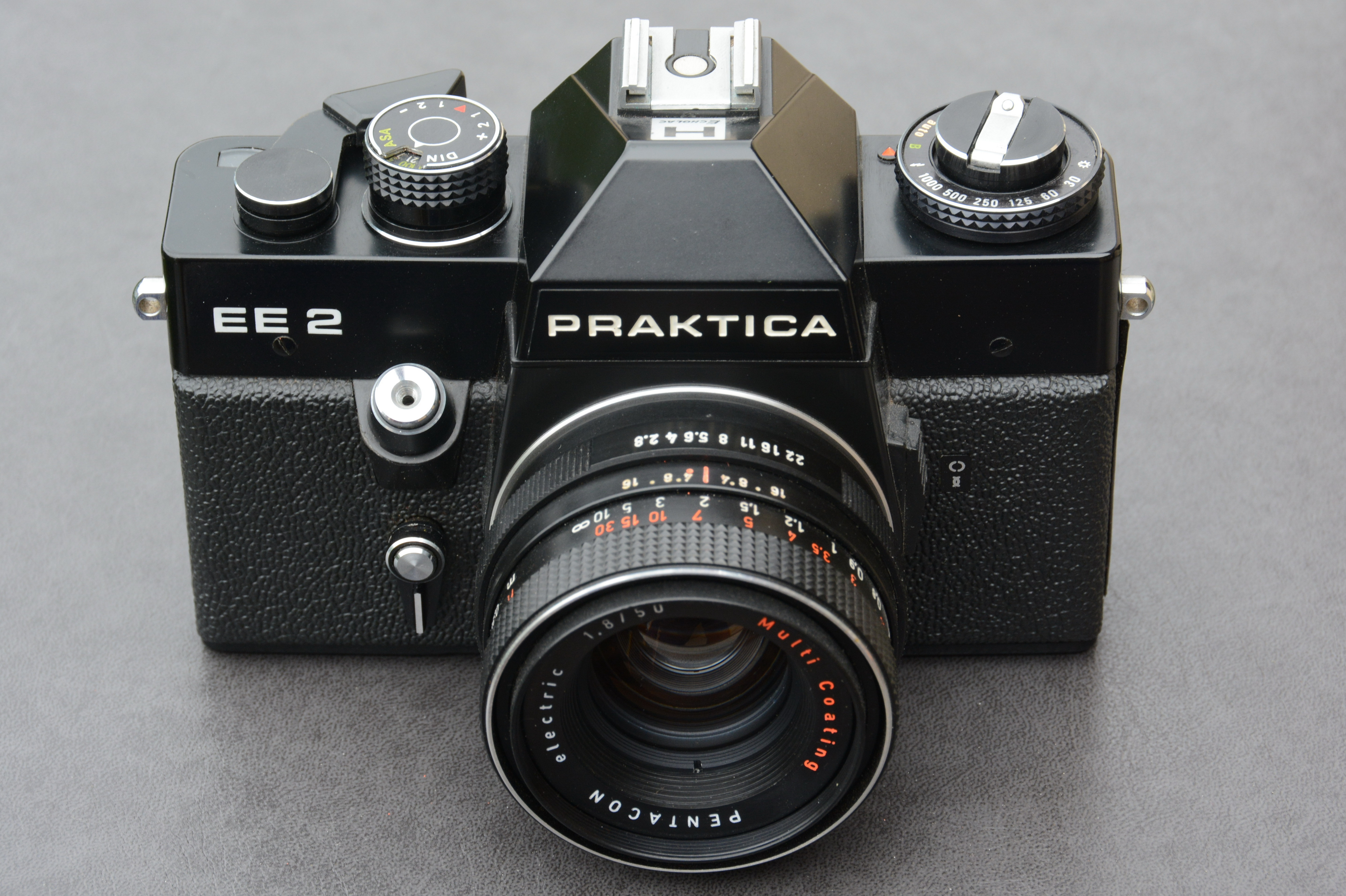
Praktica EE2 SLR from 1977

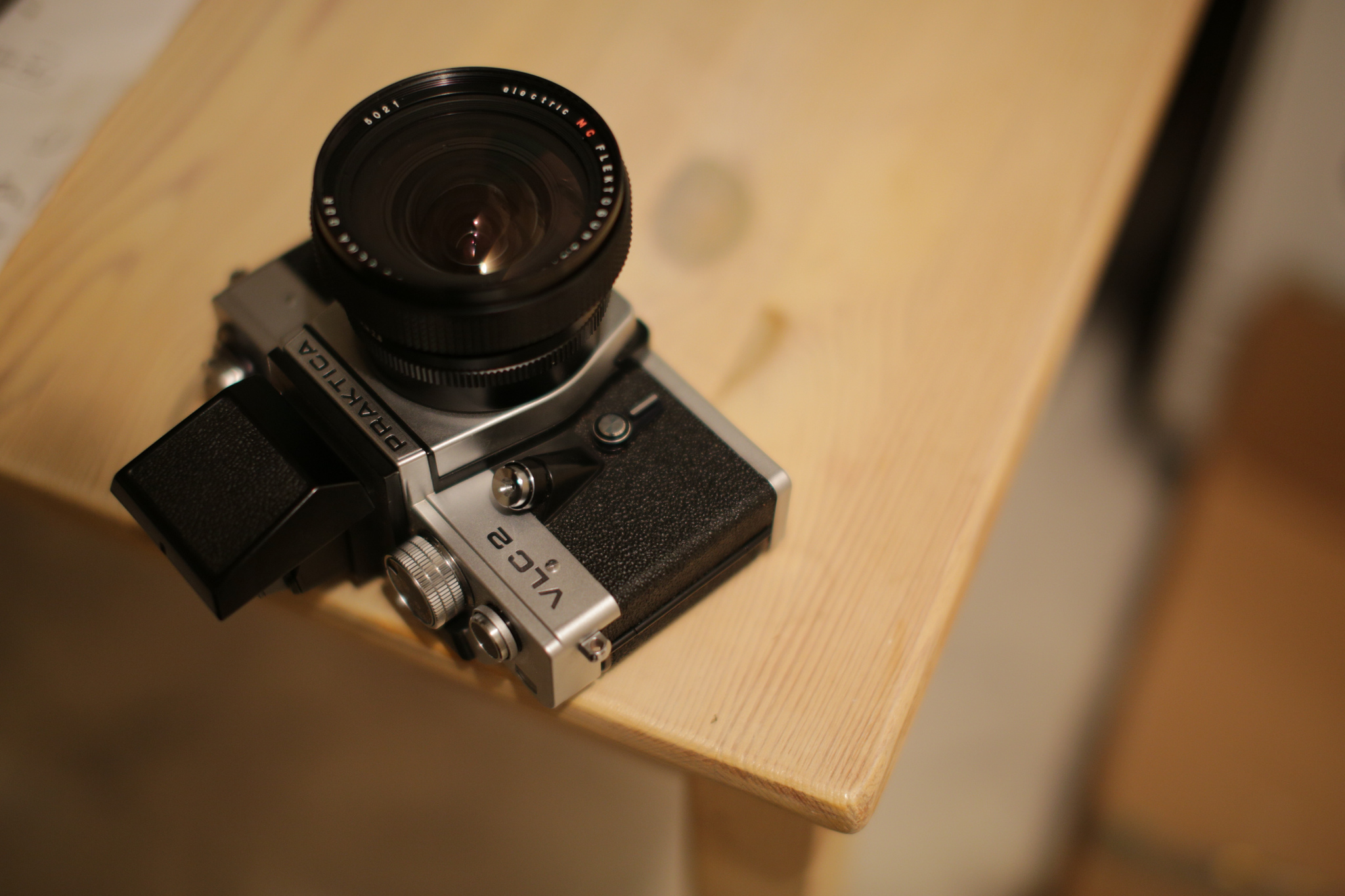
Pentacon Praktica VLC2 with Carl Zeiss Jena Flektogon 20/2.8 mounted

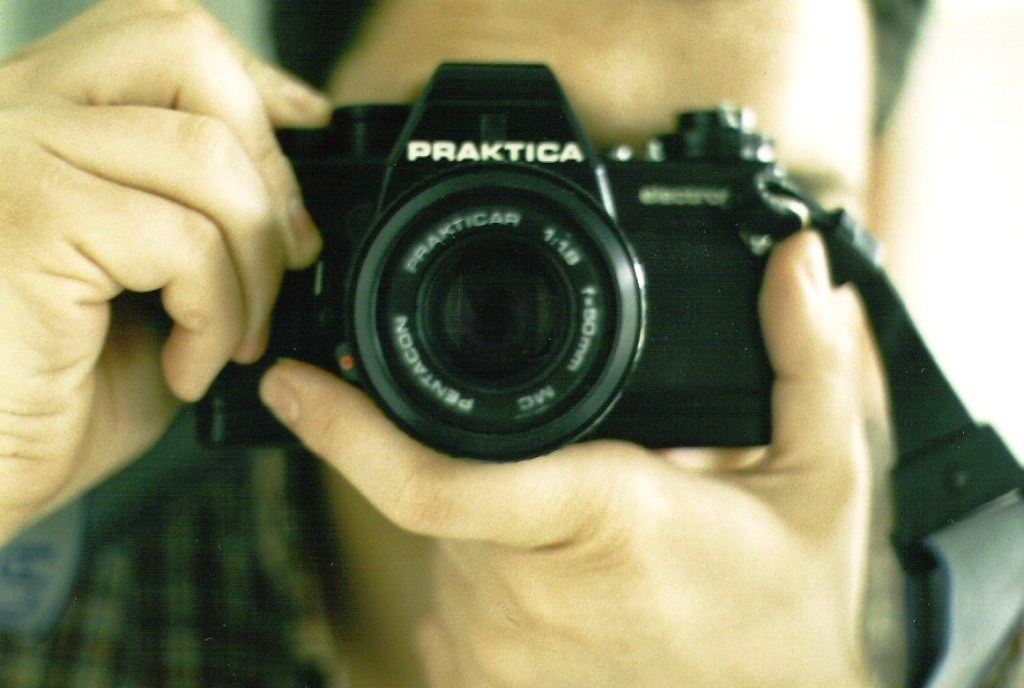
Praktica BC1 from the early 1980s

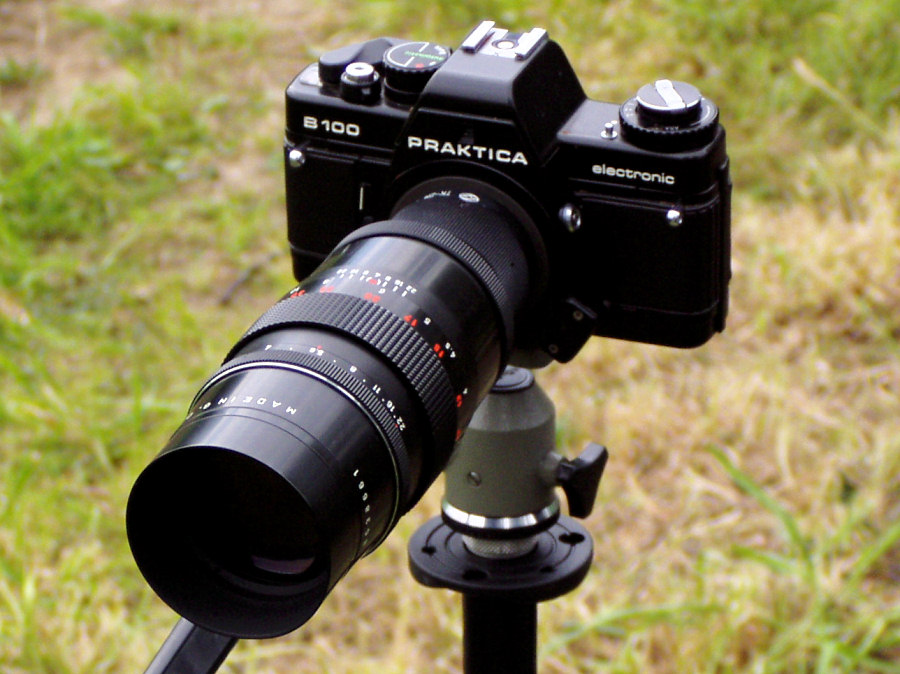
Praktica B100 electronic

- 1887 Richard Hüttig founded the first camera manufacturing company in Dresden.
- 1896 Zeus-mirror reflex camera with plate magazine as first single-lens reflex camera from Dresden by the company Richard Hüttig & Sohn.
- 1897-98 Foundation of the Aktiengesellschaft für Camera-Fabrikation Heinrich Ernemann in Dresden; Foundation of the Aktiengesellschaft für photographische Industrie Emil Wünsche in Dresden.
- 1903 Bosco mirror camera for 9×9 roll films by the Wünsche AG.
- 1903 The Ernemann-Kino movie camera uses 17.5 mm One-hole filmstrips for taking and displaying movies. The word Kino (cinema) had been born.
- 1906 Hüttig-AG becomes the biggest camera manufacturer in Europe with more than 800 employees.
- 1912 Foundation of the Industrie- und Handelsgesellschaft m.b. H., named Ihagee Kamerawerk GmbH since 1914.
- 1919 Foundation of the camera shop of Benno Thorsch and Paul Guthe.
- 1923 Inauguration of the 48 m high tower building of the Ernemann AG (see photography on the Pentacon GmbH page).
- 1924 The high-speed Ernostar lens designed by Ludwig Bertele of Ernemann AG, was first made in f/2, then in f/1.8 maximum aperture. Its unprecedented speed made available-light photography possible for the first time. While it was supplied to a number of other cameras, it was best known on Ernemann's own Er-Nox (later called Ermanox) cameras.
- 1926 With the help of the Carl Zeiss Stiftung, four German camera manufacturers - Contessa-Nettel (Stuttgart), Ernemann and ICA (both Dresden), and C.P. Goerz (Berlin) were merged to form Zeiss-Ikon AG, and became the largest camera manufacturer in Europe with 3400 employees.
- 1933 EXAKTA 4×6.5, a small roll-film single-lens reflex camera using 127 film, was introduced by Ihagee Kamerawerk Steenbergen & Co.
- 1935 Contaflex: first 35 mm twin-lens reflex camera with interchangeable lens and the first camera with built-in exposure meter was introduced by Zeiss-Ikon AG.
- 1936 Kine Exakta: first 35 mm single-lens reflex camera introduced by Ihagee Kamerawerk Steenbergen & Co.
- 1939 Praktiflex introduced by K.W. AG, Dresden-Niedersedlitz
- 1945 Heavy destruction of the 'Dresdner Kamerabetriebe' (Camera Manufacturing of Dresden) through aerial bombing on February, 13th-14th 1945
- 1949 Contax S: first 35 mm single-lens reflex camera with built-in pentaprism viewfinder (world novelty), offering an unreversed viewfinder image, introduced by MECHANIK Zeiss Ikon VEB, at that time a 'state-owned' company. It also introduced the M42 screw lens mount for interchangeable lenses.
- 1949 Praktica single-lens reflex camera with M42 lens mount
- 1950 EXAKTA Varex by Ihagee Kamerawerk AG is the first single-lens reflex camera with interchangeable view-finders

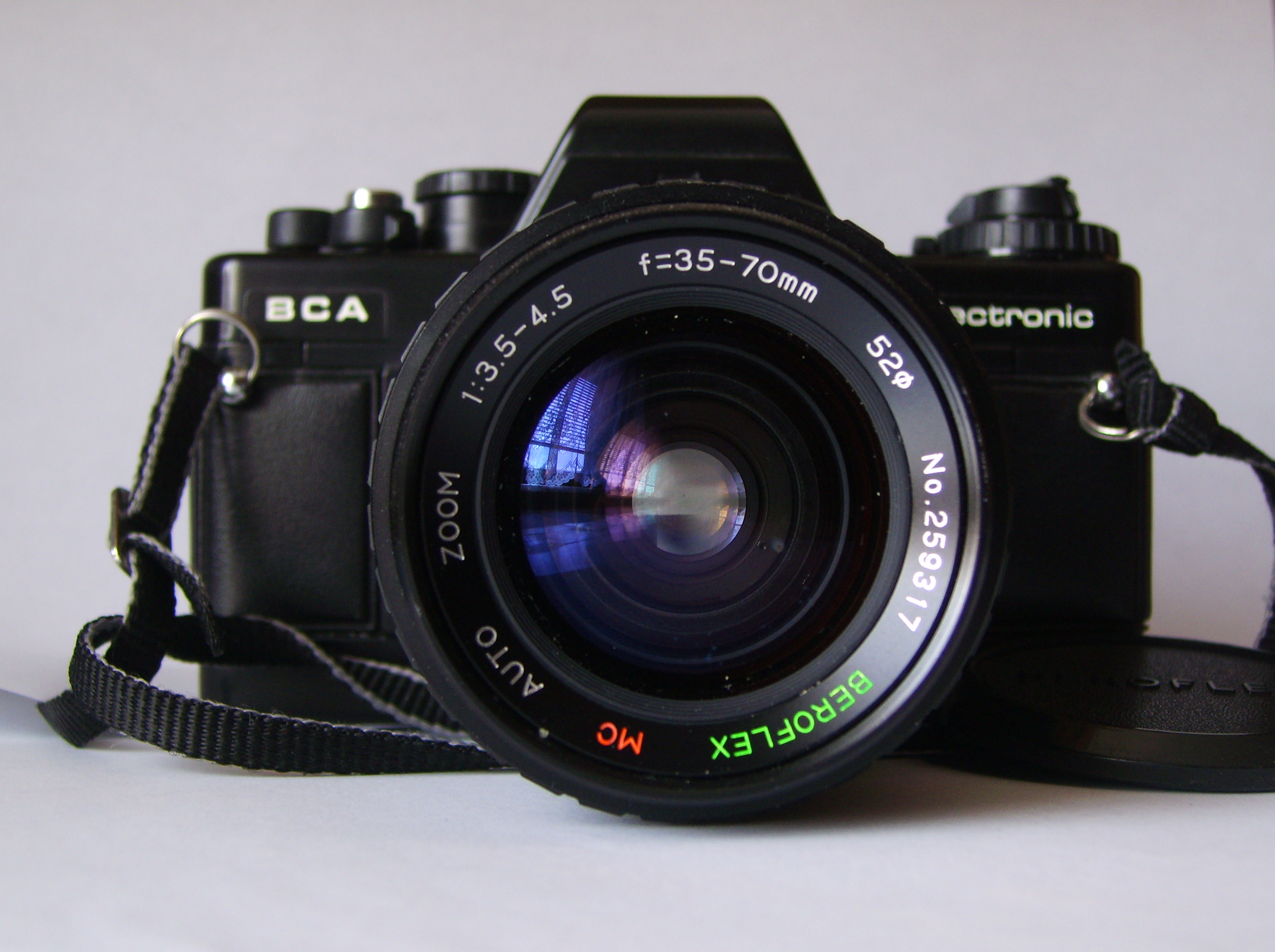
Praktica BCA from the late 1980s

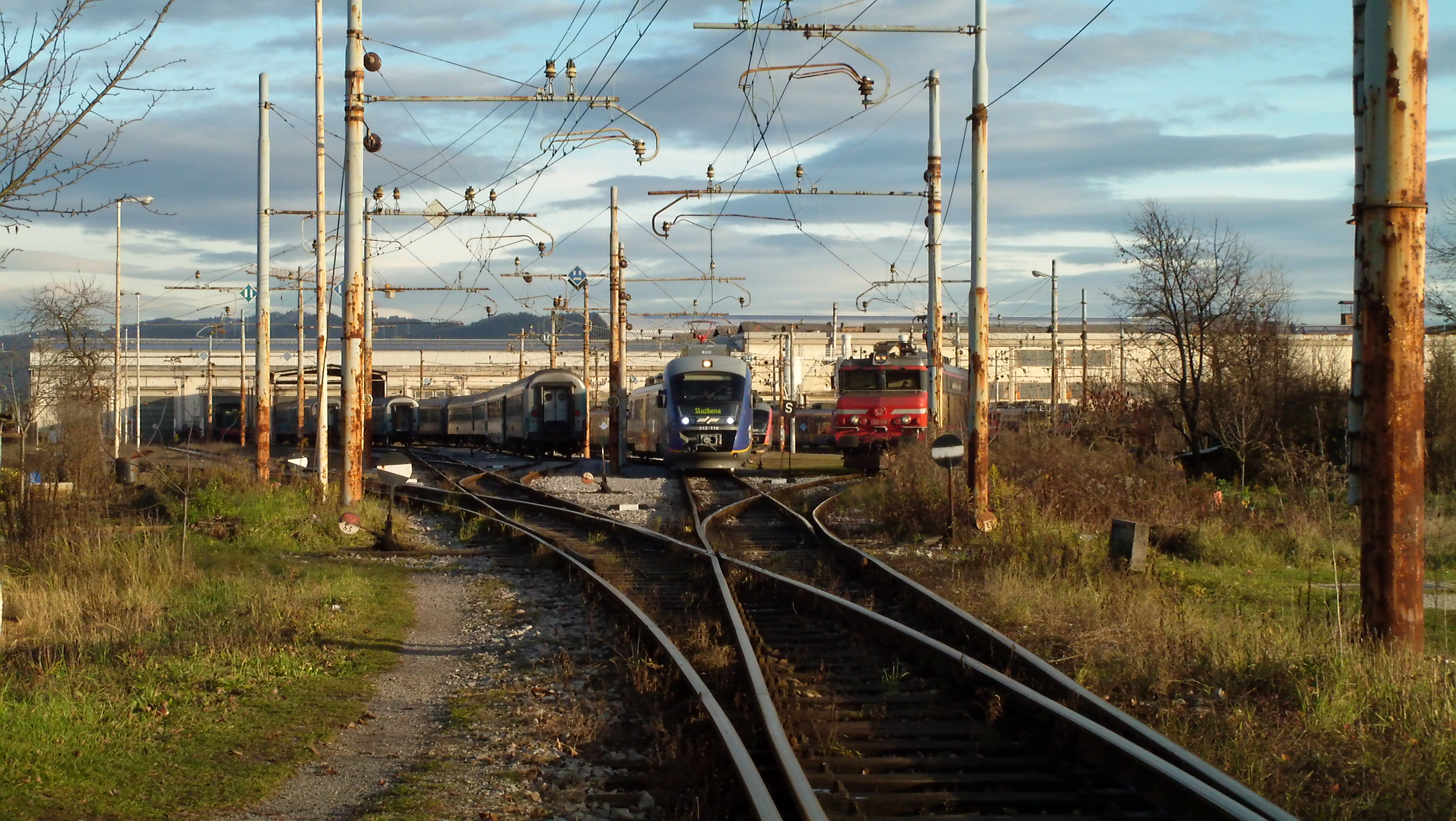
Sample picture made by Praktica camcorder DVC 10.1 HDMI in LW resolution.

- 1956 Praktica FX2 by VEB Kamera-Werke Dresden-Niedersedlitz is the first 35 mm single-lens reflex camera with diaphragm stop-down actuation mechanism built inside the lens mount
- 1959 Merger of the 'Dresdner Kamerabetriebe' (Camera Manufacturing of Dresden) to 'VEB Kamera- und Kinowerke Dresden' (VEB Pentacon Dresden since 1964).
- 1965 Praktica mat by VEB Pentacon Dresden is the first 35 mm single-lens reflex camera with TTL exposure measurement in Europe.
- 1969 Praktica LLC is the first 35 mm single-lens reflex camera with electrical diaphragm simulation between interchangeable lenses and camera body by the VEB Pentacon (Dresden).

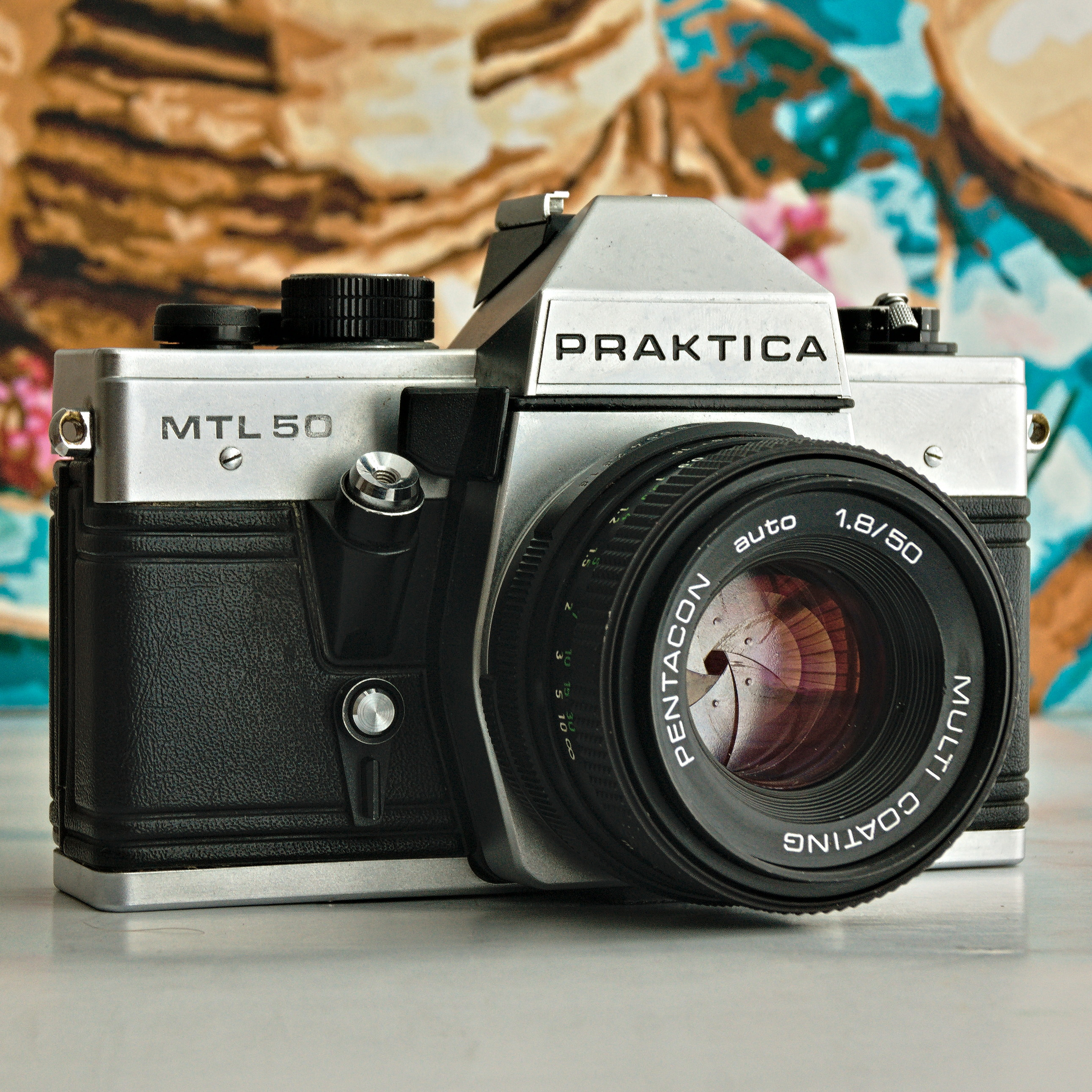
Praktica MTL 50 with Pentacon 50 mm f/1.8

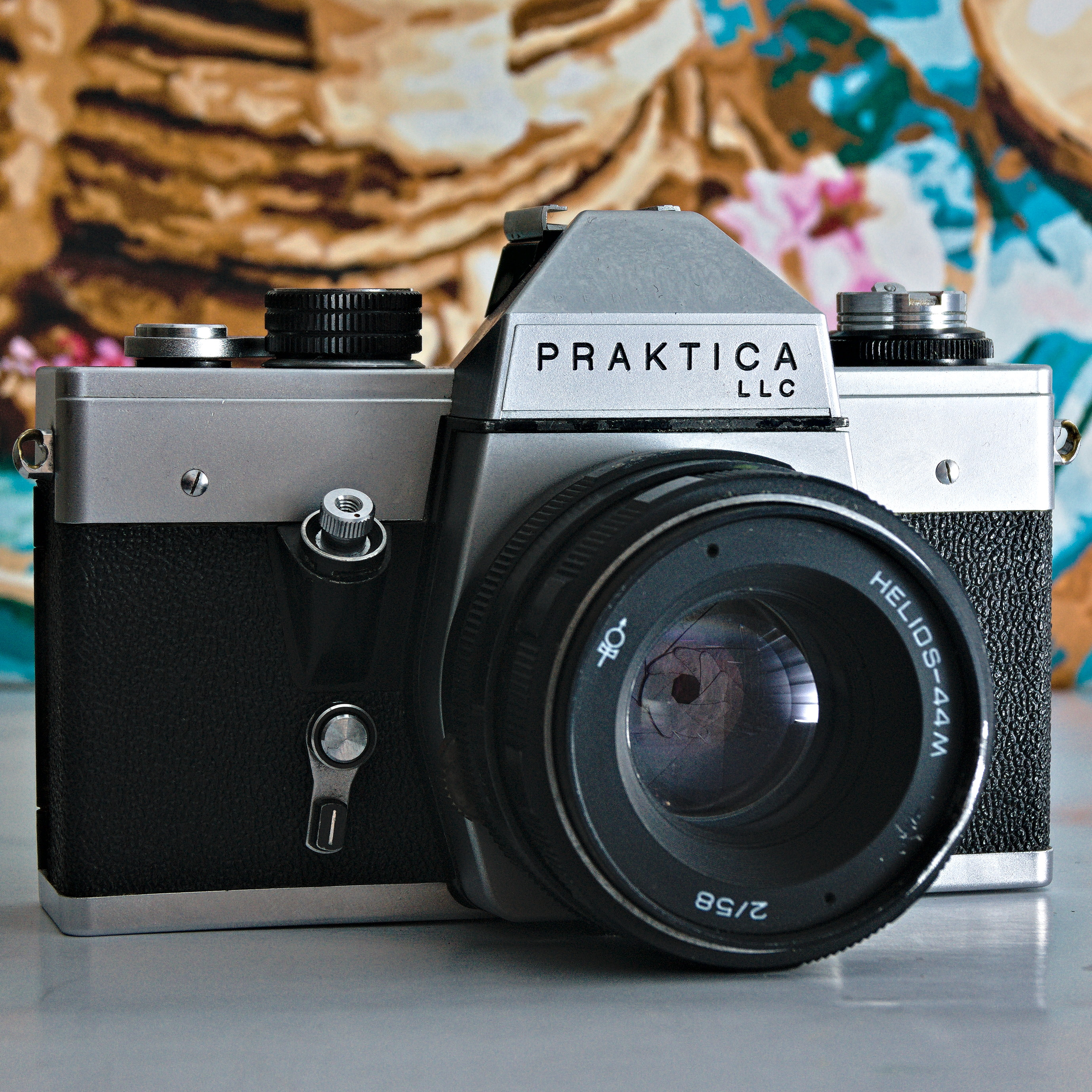
Praktica LLC with Helios 44M 58 mm f 2

The MTL series was successful and is not mentioned. So is the electronic SLRs of the B series.

== Praktica SLR cameras ==
Original Praktica

- Praktica - 1949 to 1952
- Praktica FX - 1952 to 1955
- Praktica MX - 1952 to 1954
- Praktica Modell III - 1955 to 1956
- Praktica FX 2 - 1955 to 1959
- Praktica FX 3 - 1956 to 1958

Praktica IV / V

- Praktica IV - 1959 to 1966
- Praktica IV B
- Praktica IV M
- Praktica IV BM
- Praktica IV F
- Praktica IV FB
- Praktica V F
- Praktica V FB

Praktica nova / mat

- Praktica nova - 1964 to 1967
- Praktica nova B - 1965 to 1967
- Praktica mat - 1965 to 1969

Praktica PL-series

- Praktica PL nova I - 1967 to 1972
- Praktica PL nova I B - 1967 to 1975
- Praktica Super TL - 1968 to 1976
- Praktica PL electronic - 1968 to 1969

=== L series ===
1st generation L-series

- Praktica L - 1969 to 1975
- Praktica LLC - 1969 to 1975
- Praktica LTL - 1970 to 1975
- Praktica LB - 1972 to 1976
- Praktica VLC - 1974 to 1975
- Praktica LTL 2 - 1975 to 1978
- Praktica TL - 1976
- Praktica Super TL 2 - 1977 to 1978

2nd generation L-series

- Praktica L2 - 1975 to 1980
- Praktica LTL 3 - 1975 to 1978
- Praktica PLC 2 - 1975 to 1978
- Praktica L3 ENDO - 1975 to 1980
- Praktica LB 2 - 1976 to 1977
- Praktica VLC 2 - 1976 to 1978
- Praktica EE 2 - 1977 to 1979
- Praktica DTL 2 - 1978 to 1979

3rd generation L-series

- Praktica Super TL 3 - 1978 to 1980
- Praktica MTL 3 - 1978 to 1984
- Praktica VLC 3 - 1978 to 1981
- Praktica PLC 3 - 1978 to 1983
- Praktica DTL 3 - 1979 to 1982
- Praktica EE 3 - 1979 to 1980

4th generation L-series

- Praktica Super TL 1000 - 1980 to 1986
- Praktica Super TL 500 - 1981
- Praktica MTL 5 - 1983 to 1985
- Praktica MTL 5B - 1985 to 1989
- Praktica MTL 50 - 1987 to 1989

=== B-series ===
- Praktica B 200 - 1979 to 1984
- Praktica B 100 - 1981 to 1986
- Praktica BC 1 - 1984 to 1988
- Praktica BCA - 1986 to 1990
- Praktica BCC - 1989 to 1990
- Praktica BCS - 1989 to 1990
- Praktica BM - 1989 to 1990
- Praktica BMS - 1989 to 1992

=== BX-series ===
- Praktica BX 20 - 1987 to 1993
- Praktica BX 10 DX - 1989 to 1990
- Praktica BX 21 DX - 1990
- Praktica BX 20 S - 1990 to 2001

== See also ==
- John H. Noble
- Zeiss Ikon
