= Praktica EE2 =

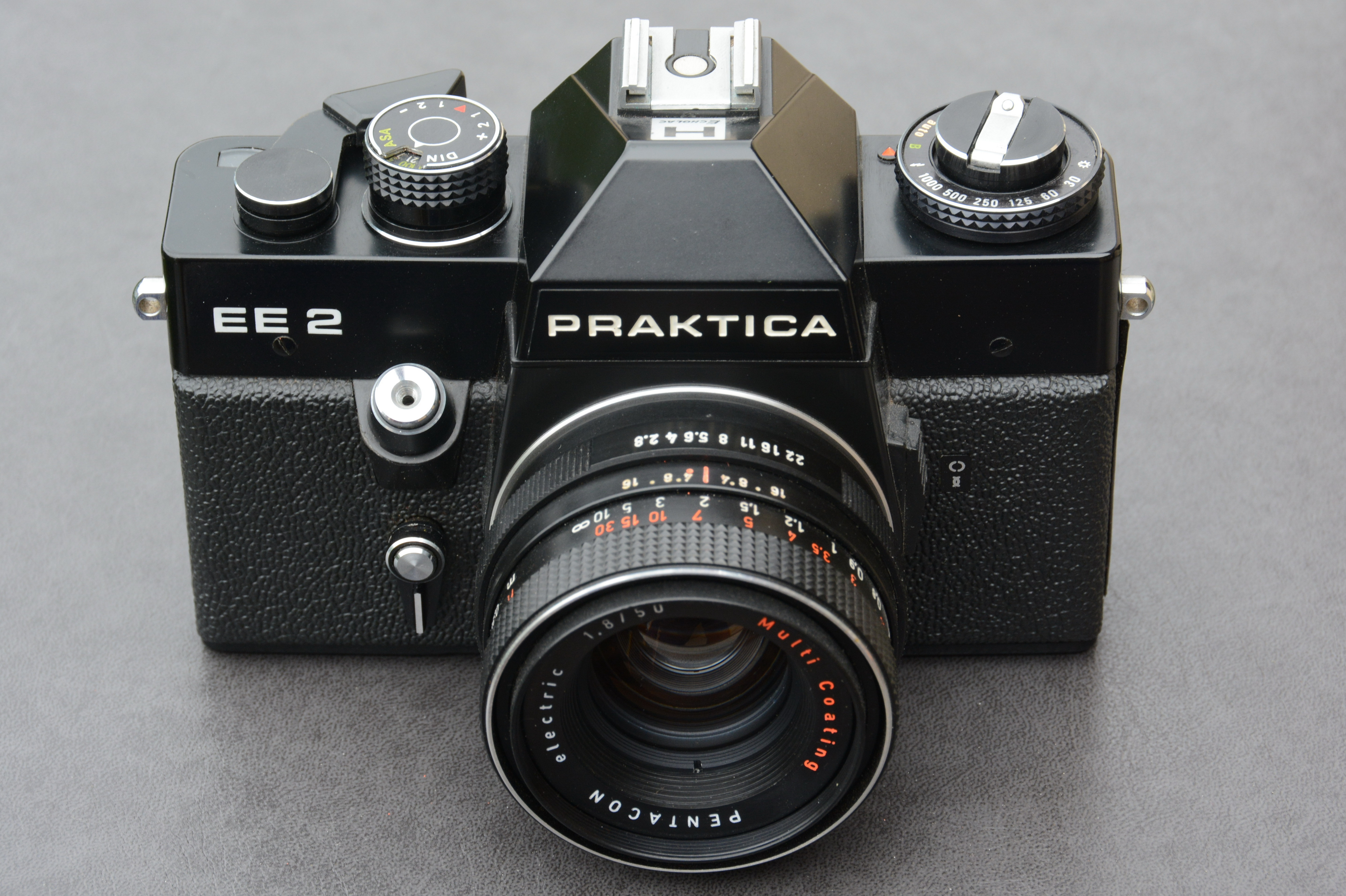
Praktica EE2 SLR black

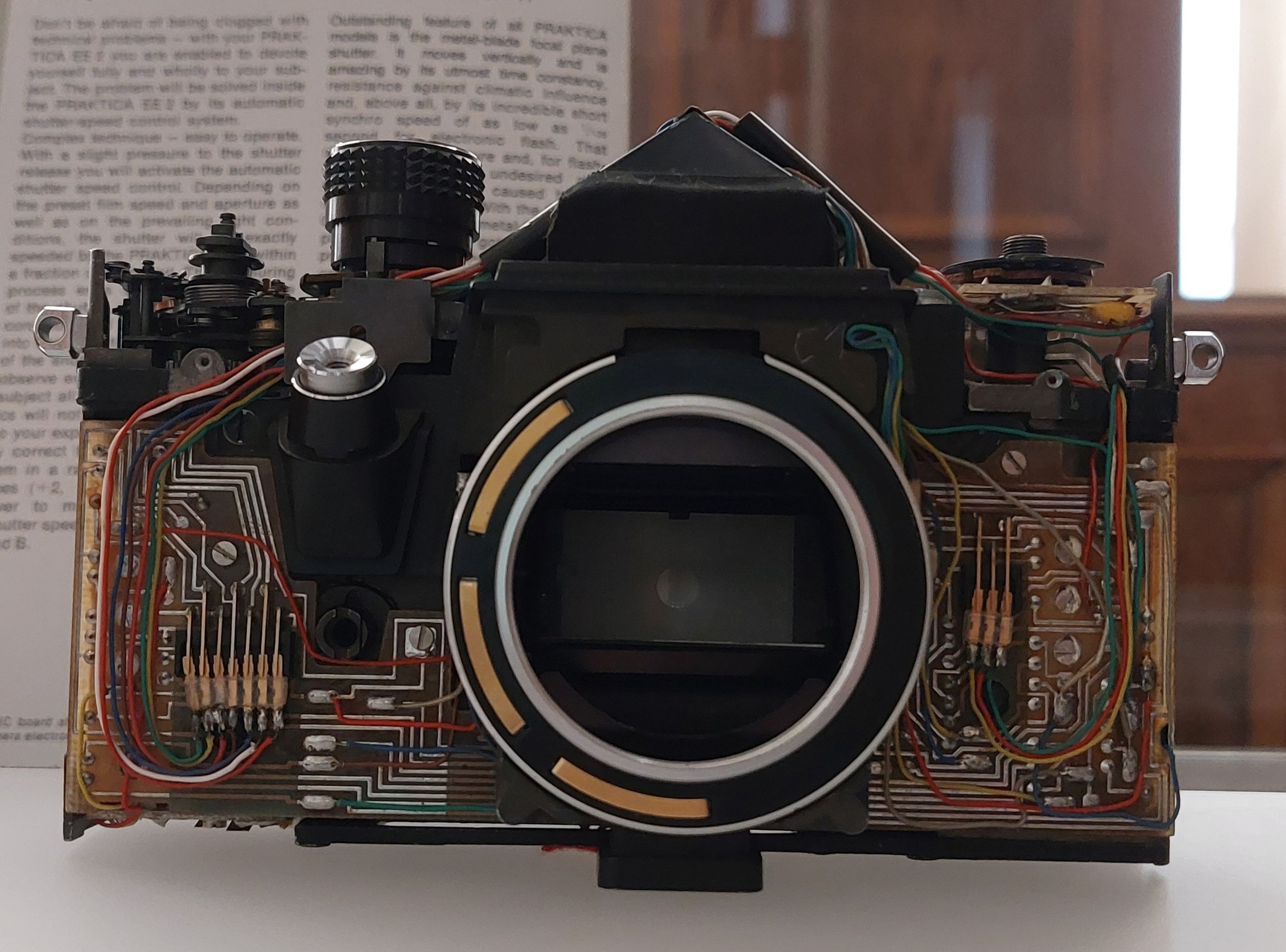
Electronics of the Praktica EE2

The Praktica EE2 was an important innovation of the 2-L generation. It was a camera with "fully electronic, full aperture TTL metering SLR" or "camera-computer". This camera had an electronic time control between 1 sec and 1/1000s and an electronic aperture simulation. Praktica EE2 cameras were used in space on board Salyut 6 in September 1978 by Bykowsky (USSR) and Jähn (GDR).
