= Kamera-Werkstätten =

Kamera-Werkstätten Guthe & Thorsch was a photographic equipment manufacturer based in Dresden.

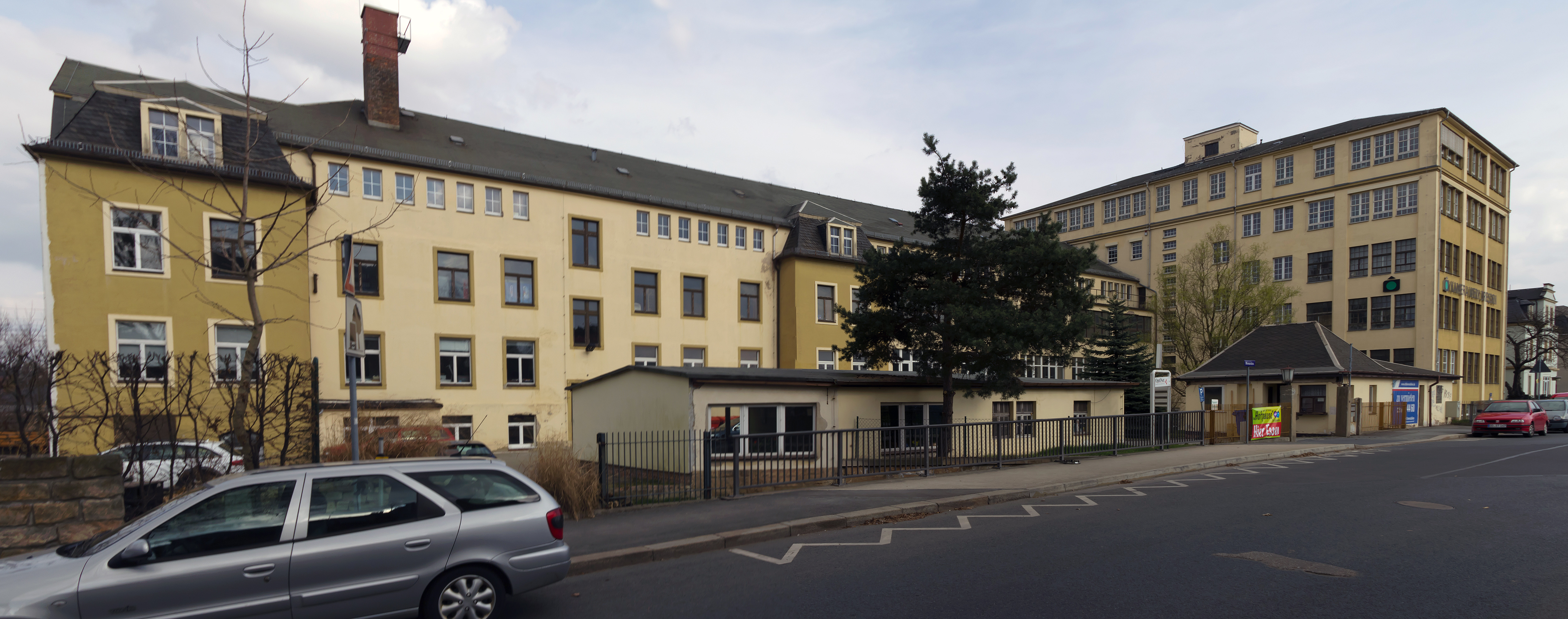
Kamera-Werkstätten

== Kamera-Werkstätten Guthe & Thorsch ==
By the beginning of the twentieth century the photographic industry prospered using new manufacturing methods, building smaller, lighter and more reliable equipment, and using better materials like aluminium and steel rather than wood, brass and leather. After World War I, the camera industry in Dresden surely had the most specialized workforce in that field, comprising several respected brands. It was at this time the Kamera-Werkstätten, K.W. was established in Dresden, Germany.

Kamera-Werkstätten Guthe & Thorsch, K.W. for short, was established in 1919 in Dresden, by Paul Guthe and Benno Thorsch to manufacture cameras and associated products. The first was the Patent Etui 6×9 plate camera previously designed by Guthe. The 3×4 TLR Pilot Reflex 3×4 medium format roll-film camera range began in 1931, which by 1935 evolved into the 6×6 120 film SLR Pilot 6 that surely is among the earliest examples of compact SLR roll film cameras, which together with the Kochmann Reflex Korelle lead the way to the 1948 6×6 Hasselblad SLR cameras. At the time, the 35mm miniature SLR camera was the latest development in Dresden, and in 1939, K.W. brought out the Praktiflex. It was the first 35mm SLR to challenge the 1936 Kine Exakta, manufactured by IHAGEE elsewhere in Dresden. However, the uncomplicated and seemingly insignificant Praktiflex has had considerable impact on the development of future 35mm SLR cameras. Even before this, dark skies over Europe had made Benno Thorsch, the surviving partner from 1919, determined to immigrate to the United States, and consequently placed an advertisement to that effect. Charles A. Noble, who ran a successful photo-finishing company in Detroit, Michigan, answered while visiting Dresden, and they agreed to exchange their interests in their respective enterprises. (ref. The Washington Post Nov. 17, 2007: Post Mortem)

== Kamera-Werkstätten AG, Niedersedlitz ==
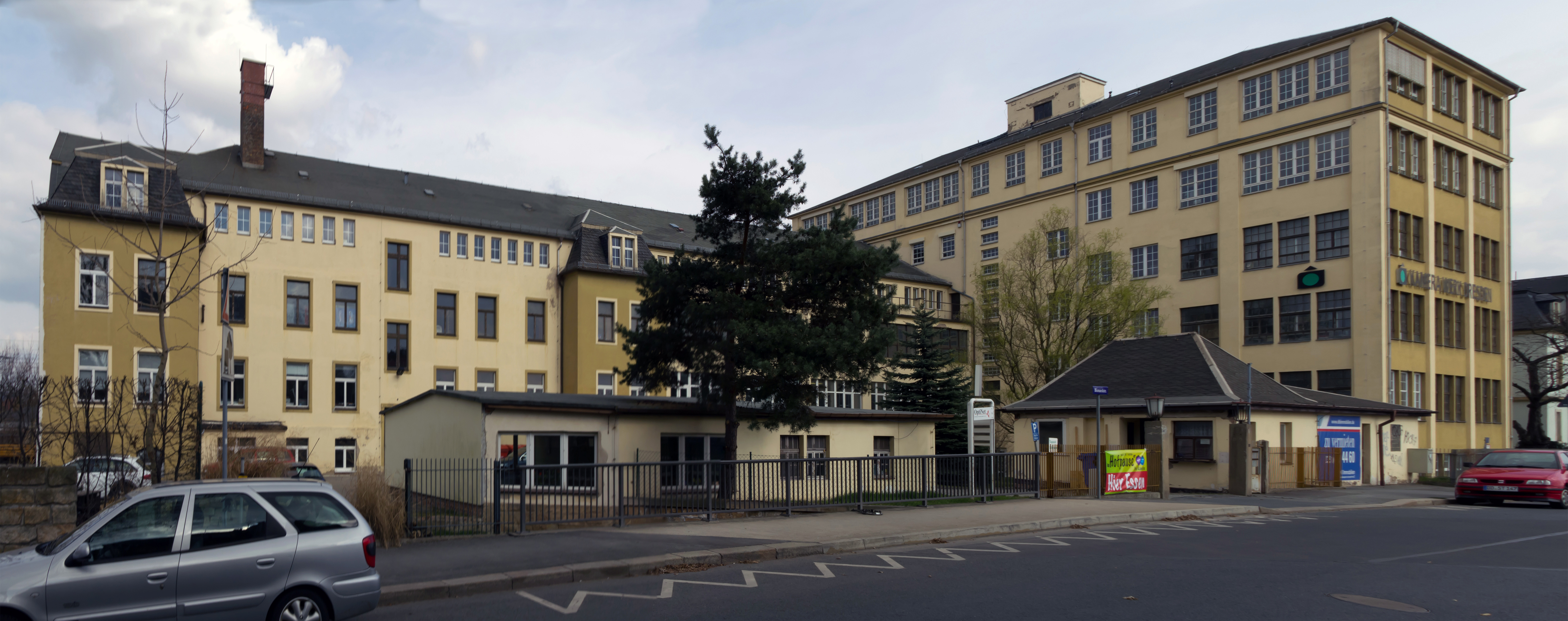
Kamera-Werke Niedersedlitz in 2011

Benno Thorsch and his family settled in Detroit, while Charles A. Noble brought his family to Dresden in the spring 1938, where he moved the factory to the southernmost part of Dresden, and changed its name to Kamera-Werkstätten AG, Dresden-Niedersedlitz. The factory was allowed to manufacture cameras throughout the WW II, but in the summer of 1945 Charles A. Noble and his son, John were arrested on unsupported spy charges by the Soviet occupying forces, and the factory nationalised, (ref.: John H. Noble) becoming part of the VEB Pentacon organisation, which evidently absorbed every photographic enterprise in East Germany. Both were imprisoned in labour camps and kept until Charles Noble was released in 1952, and his son in 1955 by intervention of President Dwight D. Eisenhower. Both returned to the US where the family now lived. (ref.: John H. Noble) After the reunification of Germany in 1990, the Noble family was able to reclaim their home and factory in Dresden, and to continue the enterprise.

== After World War II ==
In 1946 the camera works at Niedersedlitz became nationalised and was renamed accordingly the VEB Kamerawerkstätten, Dresden-Niedersedlitz. Production of the Praktiflex camera resumed with a minimum of parts supply, but development of new and improved models soon resulted in the Praktiflex II.
