= Helios-44 =

Soviet brand of photographic lens

Zeiss Biotar optical formula

Helios-44 is a Soviet copy of the Carl Zeiss Biotar 58mm ƒ/2 lens produced under the Helios lens brand. The lens was made in the Soviet Union and Russia, primarily for the M42 lens mount.

== Specifications ==
- Distance scale: 0.5 m to ∞
- Aperture: f/2 - f/16
- Focal Length: 58 mm
- Mount: M39, M42, Pentax-K, Zenit-D
- Filter thread: M52 x 0.75 for Helios-44X-X, M49 x 0.75 for other
- Weight: 230 g
- Resolution: 50/30 lines per millimeter (for Helios-44M-7)

== Gallery ==
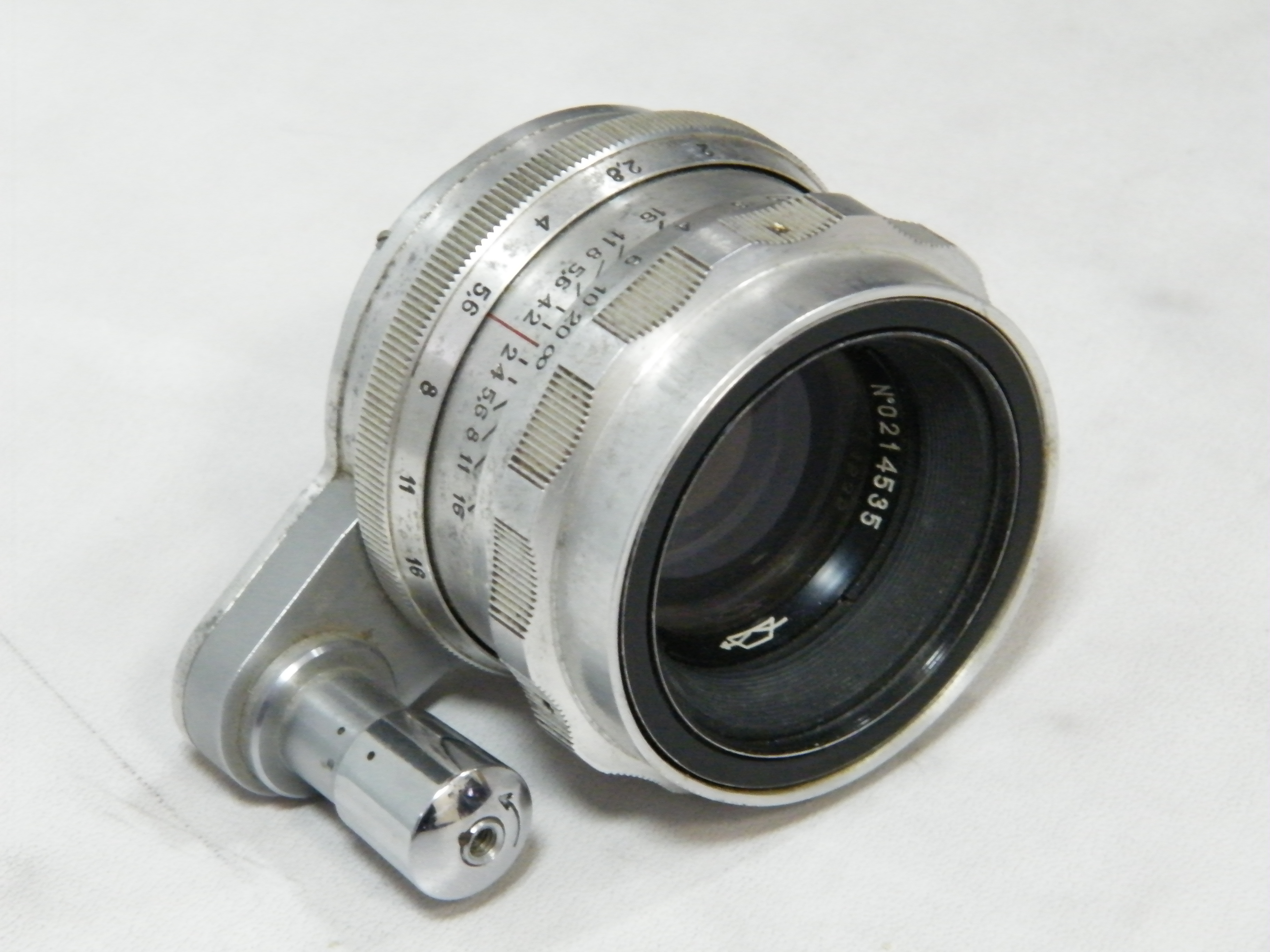
Helios-44 START

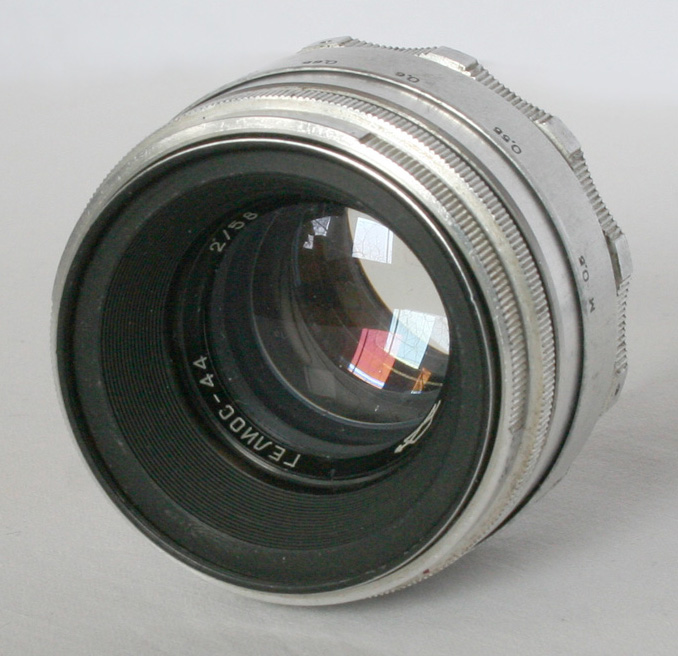
Helios-44

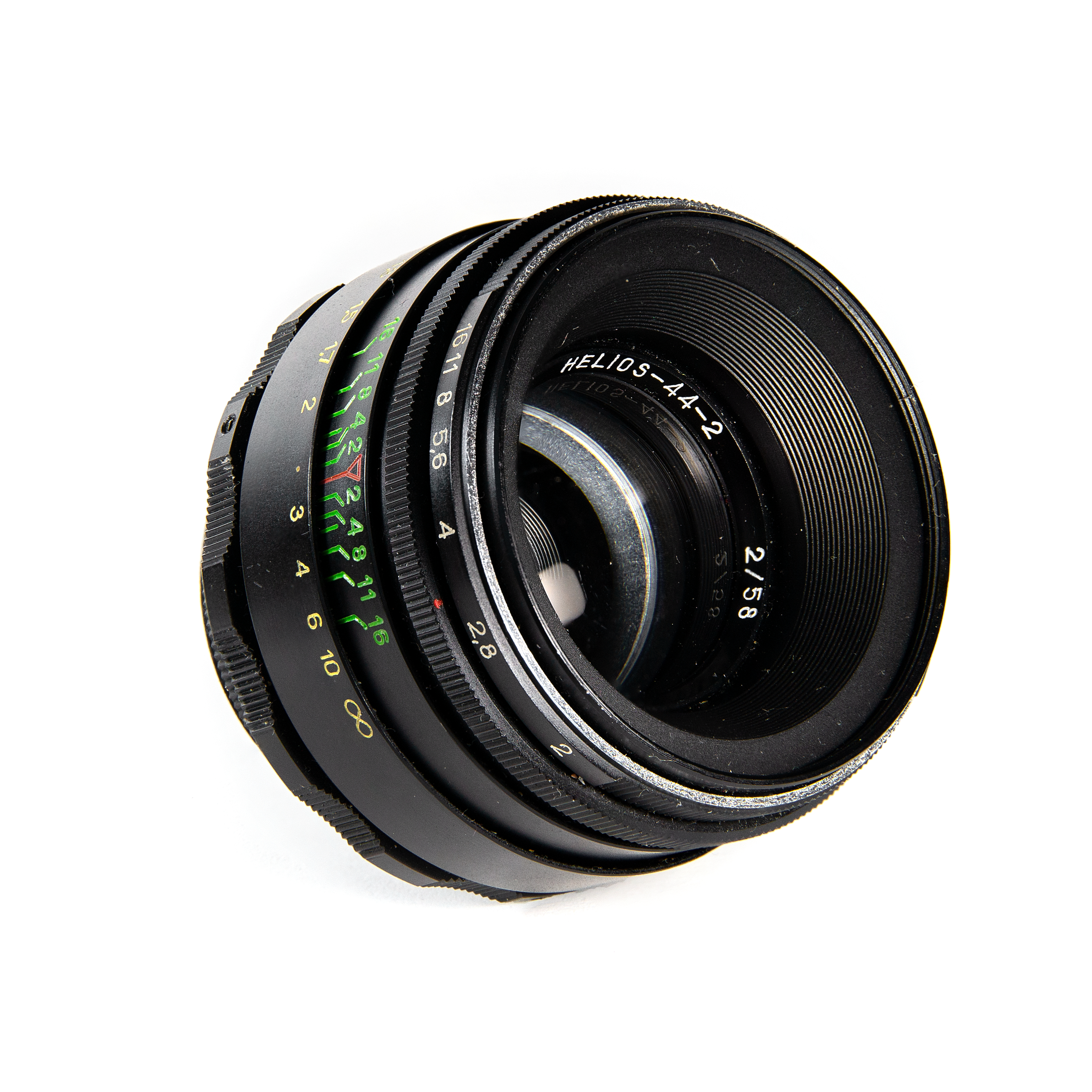
Helios-44-2

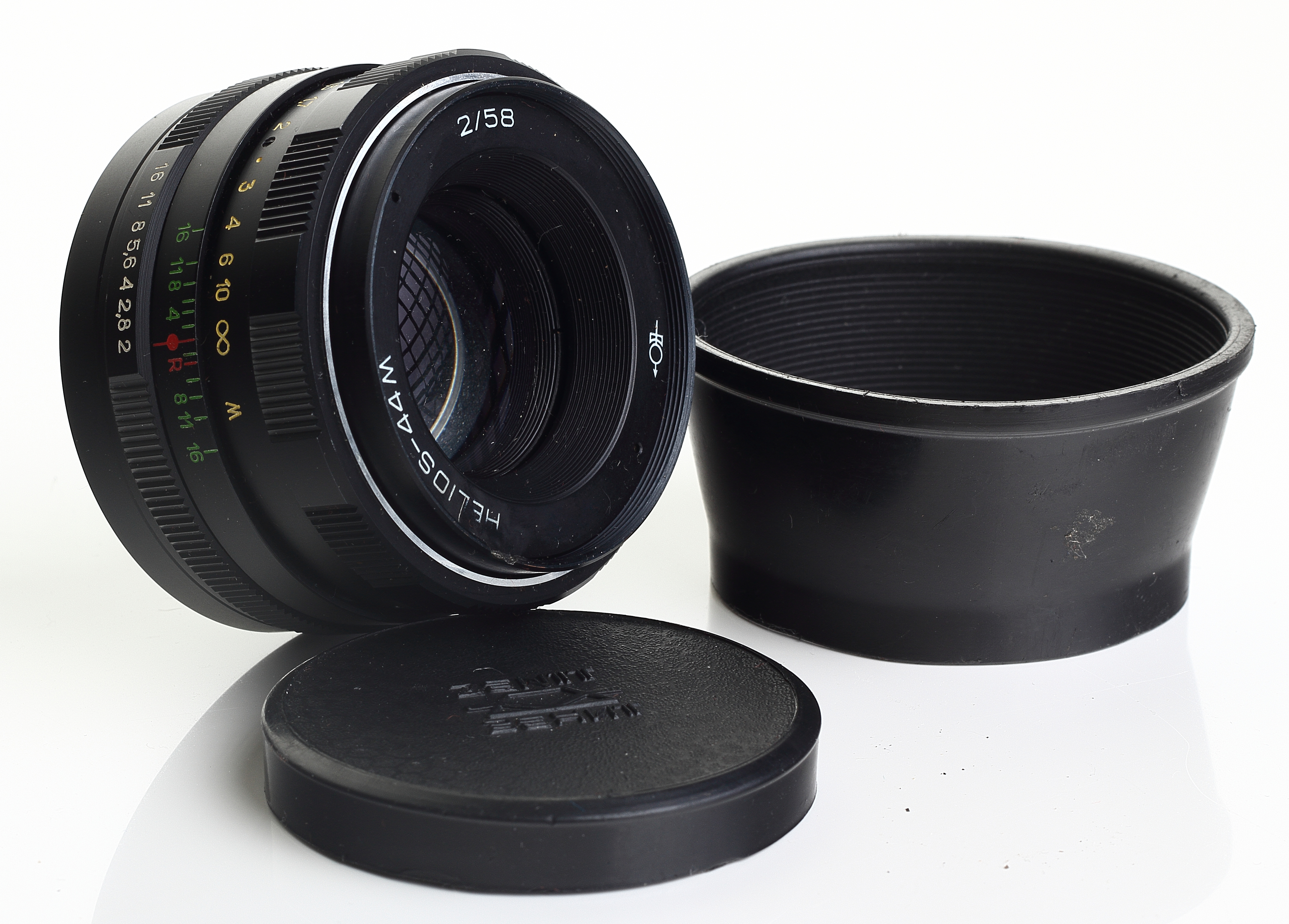
Helios-44M

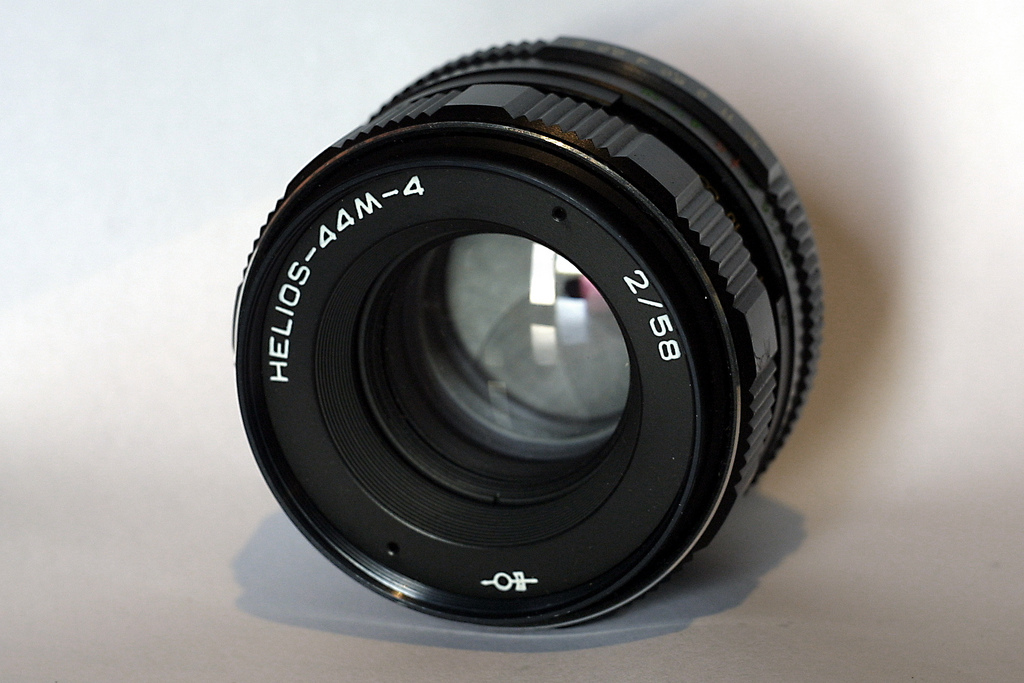
MC Helios-44M-4

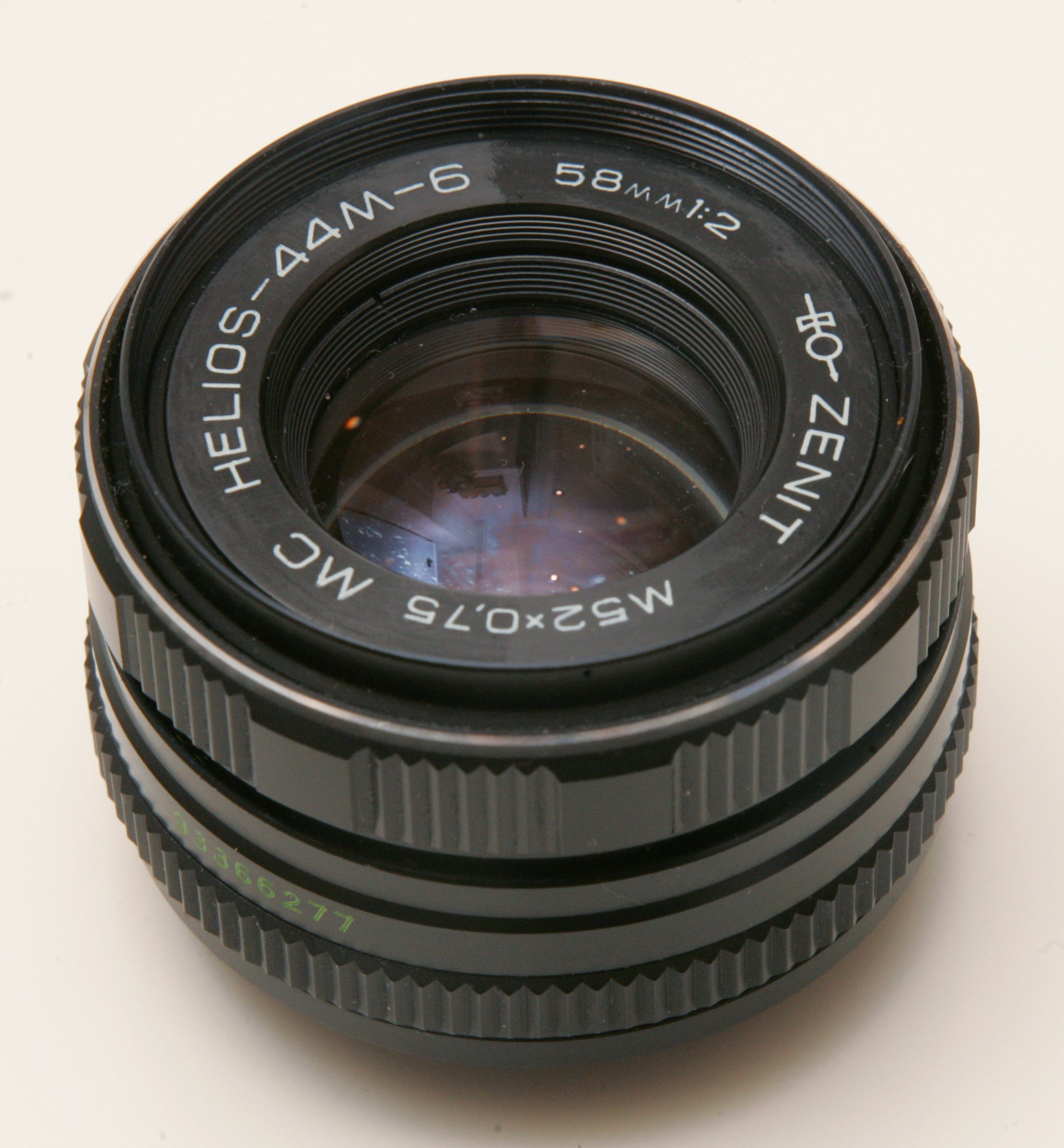
MC Helios-44M-6
