= Dash for Cash =

2021 event in Sioux Falls, South Dakota

Dash for Cash was an American event held on December 11, 2021 at the intermission of a Sioux Falls Stampede game in Sioux Falls, South Dakota. The event involved ten pre-approved teachers who each attempted to grab as many one-dollar bills as possible out of a $5,000 total. The event was widely criticized for being dehumanizing towards teachers.

== Background and planning ==
The event was planned by the Sioux Falls Stampede, a junior ice hockey team based in Sioux Falls, South Dakota. The president of the team, Jim Olander, promoted the event as a chance for teachers to acquire funds for classroom projects. Ten teachers were picked from high schools in the Sioux Falls metropolitan area, selected randomly from a group of 31 teachers who applied to participate. The teachers also sold tickets for the game; their school received $5 for every ticket they sold. The event was sponsored by CU Mortgage Direct, which provided the money used; in a joint statement, the company and the Sioux Falls Stampede later stated that their "intent was to provide a positive and fun experience for teachers".

Commenters on the event noted that teachers in South Dakota are among the worst-paid in the United States, according to a report on the 2019–2020 academic year by the National Education Association, which also ranked the state 38th out of 50 for per-student spending in the same year.

== Event ==
During the intermission of a Sioux Falls Stampede game on December 11, 2021, $5,000 in one-dollar bills was placed on a carpet in the middle of the ice hockey rink. The ten teachers, wearing hockey helmets, entered the pile of money and stuffed it into their shirts until it had all been taken. Local high school teacher Barry Longden received $616, more than any other teacher involved; every teacher received at least $378.

Argus Leader reporter Annie Todd, who was present at the event, posted video footage on Twitter, where it went viral.

== Responses ==
Randi Weingarten
(@rweingarten)
tweeted:

This just feels demeaning .. teachers shouldn’t have to dash for dollars for classroom supplies… No doubt people probably intended it to be fun, but from the outside it feels terrible

December 12, 2021

The Argus Leader reported that the teachers involved were grateful for the money they received, and planned to purchase flexible seating or document cameras.

Video footage of the event went viral on social media, and was described as being dehumanizing towards teachers as well as "dystopian" and "humiliating", drawing comparisons to scenes from The Hunger Games or Squid Game. One clip of the event, shared in a tweet, received more than 7.7 million views within two days. Bill Weir described the event as "just a few sharpened sticks away from public education 'Squid Game.'" On the Facebook page for CU Mortgage Direct, users left comments that described the event as "disgusting" and "shameful".

Randi Weingarten, president of the American Federation of Teachers, described the event as demeaning in a tweet. Tim Eckart, president of the Sioux Falls Education Association, told the Argus Leader that the event was emblematic of the "broken" education system "not only in the Sioux Falls region but across the state," stating that it was "time for us to realign our priorities by focusing on putting the money back into our students' education." Loren Paul, president of the South Dakota Education Association, said that "we shouldn’t be forcing teachers to crawl around on an ice rink to get the money they need to fund their classrooms." Reynold Nesiba, a South Dakota senator who represents a portion of Sioux Falls and additionally works as a professor of economics at Augustana University, told The Washington Post that teachers "should never have to go through something like this to be able to get the resources they need to meet the basic educational needs of our students" and urged his followers on Twitter to donate to the Sioux Falls Public Schools Education Foundation. The foundation supports school activities which are not paid for by state taxes.

The spread of stories about the event prompted additional donations to South Dakota teachers.

=== Apology ===
After a widespread negative response to the event, CU Mortgage Direct and the Sioux Falls Stampede released a joint apology. The two groups stated that they had intended to create a "positive and fun experience" for the teachers involved, but that they understood why the event was seen as "degrading and insulting towards the participating teachers and the teaching profession as a whole." They announced plans to donate an additional $15,500 to teachers in the area, with $500 more going to each of the ten participating teachers as well as each of the 21 other teachers who applied to participate in the event but were not selected.
