= S8mm =

S8mm may refer to:

- Super 8 film
- Single-8 film
