= 8 mm =

8 mm may refer to:

== Films ==
- 8mm (film), a 1999 American crime thriller
- 8mm 2, a 2005 direct-to-video thriller film
- Super 8 (2011 film), a 2011 American science fiction film

== Film technology ==
- 8 mm film, a motion picture film format
  - Super 8 film
  - Single-8 film
- 8 mm video format, three related videocassette formats

== Firearms ==
- 8 mm caliber, firearm cartridges
  - 7.92×57mm Mauser, designated 8 mm Mauser

== Music ==
- 8mm (band), a rock band from Los Angeles, California
