= X-mount =

X-mount may refer to:

- Fujica X-mount, a bayonet lens mount used on manual-focus Fujica 35mm film SLR cameras in the 1970s and 1980s
- Fujifilm X-mount, a fully electronic bayonet lens mount used on Fujifilm mirrorless APS-C digital cameras and XF lenses since 2012

== See also ==
- Samsung NX-mount
