= Fujica =

Line of Fujifilm cameras

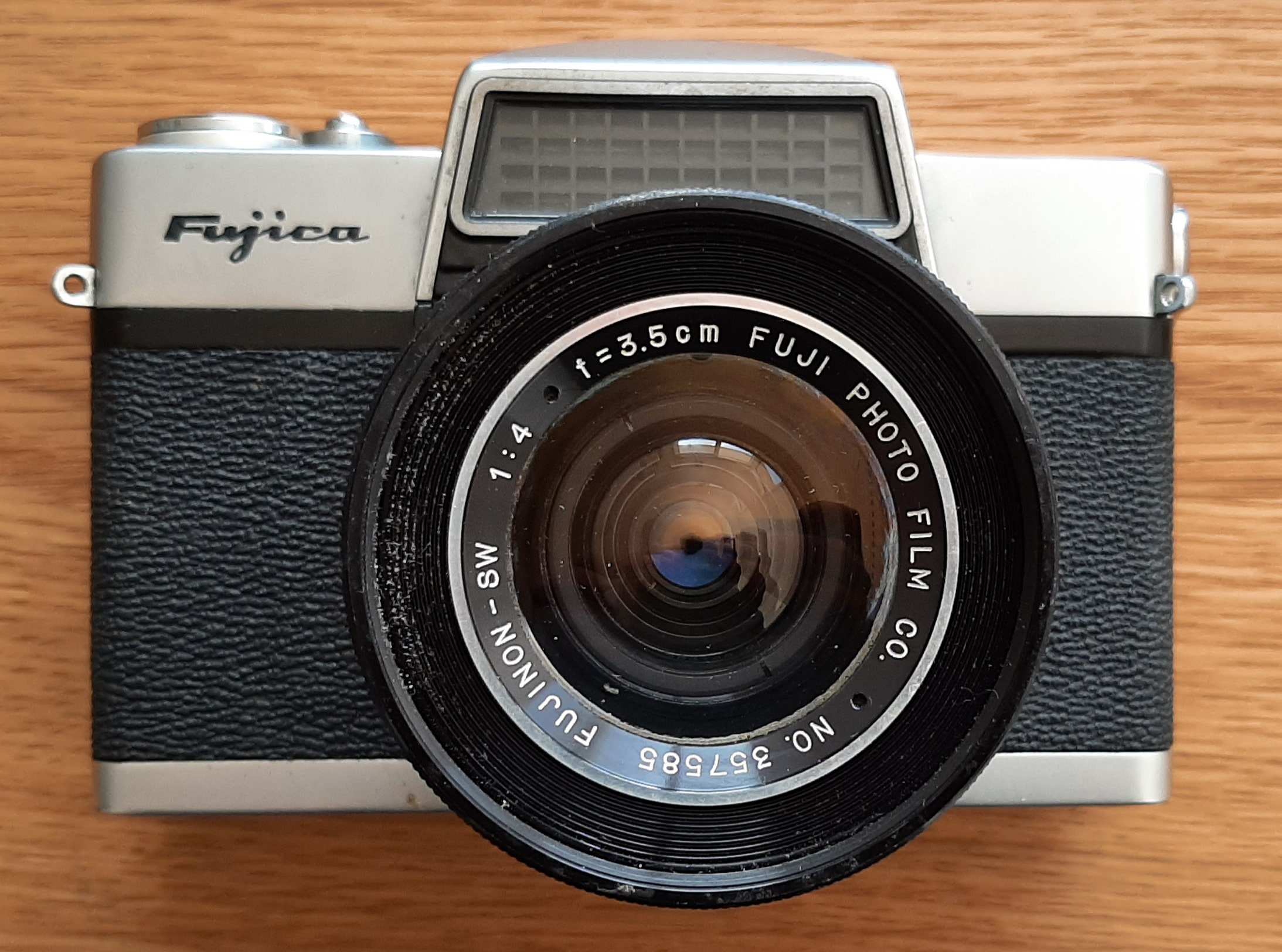
The Fujica brand is clearly seen on this 1963 Fujicarex II

Fujica is the name given by Fujifilm of Japan to its line of still-photography and motion picture cameras.

== History ==
The company was founded on January 20, 1934, as Fuji Shashin Film K.K. (富士写真フィルム㈱, later translated as Fuji Photo Film Co., Ltd.), producing several sorts of film. It was an offshoot of Dai-Nippon Celluloid K.K. (大日本セルロイド㈱), founded in 1919. The company's first CEO was Asano Shūichi (浅野修一). The plants were located in the village of Minami-Ashigara (南足柄村, now a city) in the prefecture of Kanagawa (神奈川県), at the foot of Mt. Hakone (箱根山). It is said that the name "Fuji" (富士) was chosen by Asano Shūichi because of Mt. Fuji (富士山), situated not far from Mt. Hakone, but was already registered by a third party, to which the rights were bought for ¥8,000, a large sum at the time.

The company started to produce optical glass during the early 1940s for military use. The dependent company Fuji Shashin Kōki K.K. (富士写真光機㈱, meaning "Fuji Photo Optical Co., Ltd.") was founded in 1944, from the assets of Enomoto Kōgaku Seiki Seisakusho (榎本光学精機製作所), but this was absorbed back into Fuji Shashin Film after 1945. Many other Fuji companies were created after the war, all of them dependent of the main Fuji Shashin Film company and eventually of the Fujifilm Group (富士フィルムグループ). Fuji began producing cameras in 1948 with the Fujica Six. Until the late 1970s, many cameras made by Fuji were called Fujica, a contraction of Fuji and camera (cf Leica, Yashica etc.).

Fujifilm started producing digital cameras in 1988. Fujifilm was the most agile among film makers in adapting to digital imaging. Today they make digital APS-C and medium format mirrorless interchangeable-lens cameras and fixed lens compact cameras as well, all under the Fujifilm name.

== Camera models ==
Here is a list of all the Fujica branded still photo cameras that were produced and their date of introduction. Single-8 motion film cameras are not listed.

Fujica 35mm SLR cameras
Name	Img	Year	Mount	Shutter	Meter	Modes	Dims.	Wgt.	Notes / Refs.
AX-Multi Program		1985	FX	1/2–1/1000	EV 2–18	P	135×87×54 mm (5.3×3.4×2.1 in)	460 g (16 oz)	
STX-2		1985	FX	B+1/2–1/1000	Si / EV 2–18	M	133×87×88 mm (5.2×3.4×3.5 in) (Note: Includes normal lens)	625 g (22.0 oz)	
AX-5		1980	FX	B+2–1/1000	Si / EV 0–18	P, A, S, M	135×86×54 mm (5.3×3.4×2.1 in)	525 g (18.5 oz)	
AX-3		1980	FX	B+2–1/1000	Si / EV 0–18	A, M	135×86×54 mm (5.3×3.4×2.1 in)	520 g (18 oz)	
AX-1		1980	FX	B+1/2–1/1000	Si / EV 2–18	A	135×86×54 mm (5.3×3.4×2.1 in)	500 g (18 oz)	Limited manual shutter speed selection
STX-1		1979	FX	B+1/2–1/700	Si / EV 2–17 2/3	M	133×86×48.5 mm (5.2×3.4×1.9 in)	550 g (19 oz)	Updated ST605N with X bayonet mount Followed by STX-1N with LED light meter and redesigned battery hatch.
AZ-1		1978	M42	B+1/2–1/1000	Si / EV 2–18	A, M	133×89×50.3 mm (5.2×3.5×2.0 in)	575 g (20.3 oz)	
ST-705		1977	M42	B+1–1/1500	Si / EV 1–18	M	133×86×88 mm (5 15/64×3 25/64×3 15/32 in)	580 g (20.3 oz)	
ST-605		1976	M42	B+1/2–1/700	Si / EV 3–18	M	133×86×84 mm (5 15/64×3 25/64×3 5/16 in)	560 g (19.9 oz)	
ST-901		1974	M42	B+20–1/1000	Si / EV -3–18	A, M	133×90×91 mm (5 1/4×3 9/16×3 7/12 in)	620 g (22 oz)	
ST-801		1973	M42	B+1–1/2000	Si / EV 1–19	M	133×90×89 mm (5 1/4×3 9/16×3 1/2 in)	640 g (22.4 oz)	
ST-701		1971	M42	B+1–1/1000	Si / EV 1–18	M	135×93×89 mm (5 1/3×3 2/3×3 1/2 in)	574 g (20.25 oz)	

Fujica 35mm fixed lens cameras
Name	Img	Year	Lens	Shutter	Meter / Battery	Modes	Dims.	Wgt.	Notes / Refs.
Compact Deluxe		1967	Fujinon 45 mm f/1.8–22	B, 1–1/500	CdS / MS76	P, M	135|*|87|*|54|mm|in|1}}-->style="background: var(--background-color-interactive, #EEE); color: var(--color-base, black); vertical-align: middle; text-align: center; " class="table-Unknown" | ?	640 g (23 oz)	
V-2		1964	Fujinon 45 mm f/1.8–22	B, 1–1/500	CdS / ?	P, M	135|*|87|*|54|mm|in|1}}-->style="background: var(--background-color-interactive, #EEE); color: var(--color-base, black); vertical-align: middle; text-align: center; " class="table-Unknown" | ?	?	
35 Auto-M		1962	Fujinar 47 mm f/2.8–16	B, 1/30–1/500	?	S, M	135|*|87|*|54|mm|in|1}}-->style="background: var(--background-color-interactive, #EEE); color: var(--color-base, black); vertical-align: middle; text-align: center; " class="table-Unknown" | ?	460|g|oz}}-->style="background: var(--background-color-interactive, #EEE); color: var(--color-base, black); vertical-align: middle; text-align: center; " class="table-Unknown" | ?	
Compact 35		196x	Fujinon 38 mm f/2.8–16	B, 1/30–1/500	?	?	135|*|87|*|54|mm|in|1}}-->style="background: var(--background-color-interactive, #EEE); color: var(--color-base, black); vertical-align: middle; text-align: center; " class="table-Unknown" | ?	460|g|oz}}-->style="background: var(--background-color-interactive, #EEE); color: var(--color-base, black); vertical-align: middle; text-align: center; " class="table-Unknown" | ?	

Notes

- Fujica AX-Multi Program 1985
- Fujica STX-2 1985
- Fujica AX-1N 1984
- Fujica STX-1N 1983

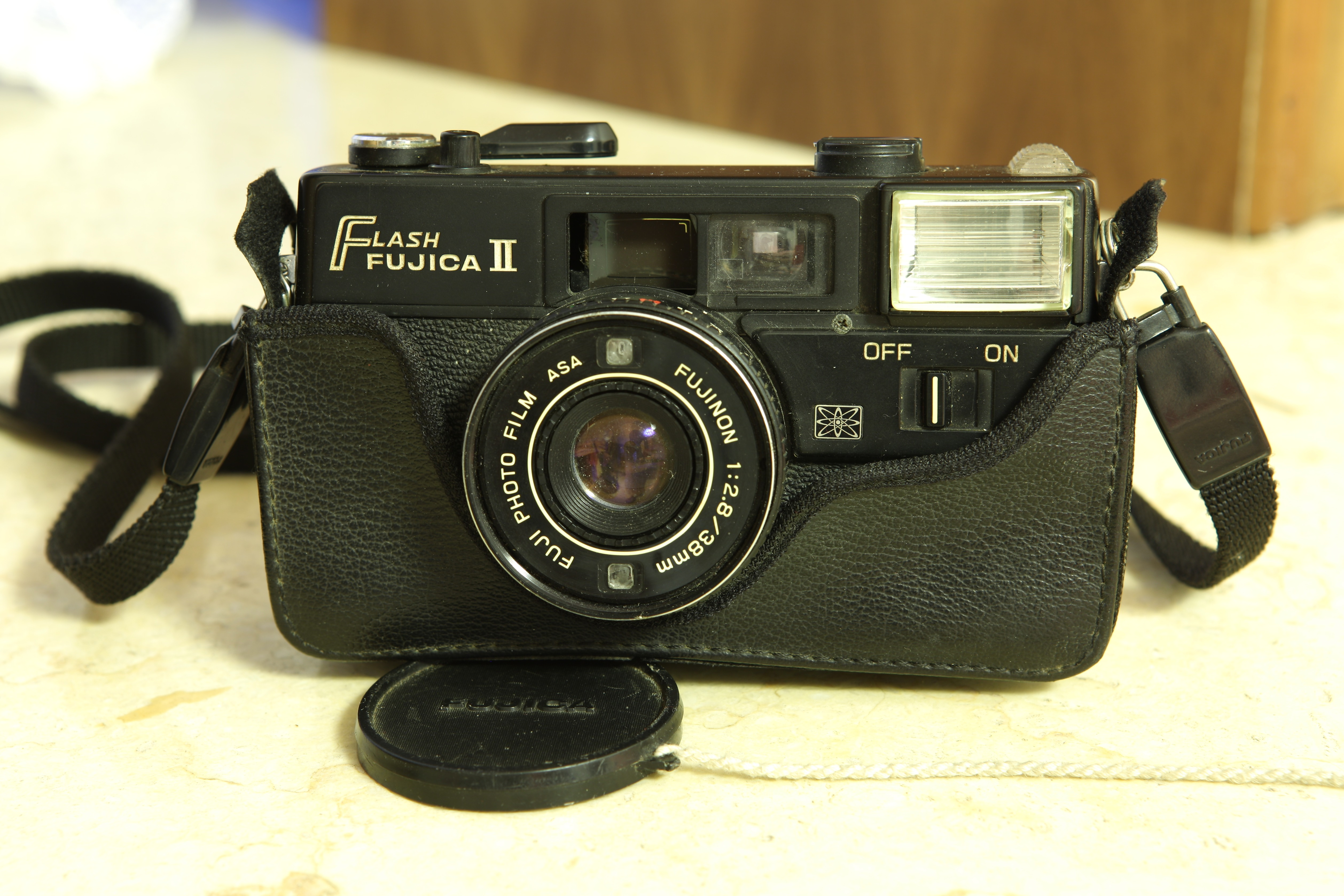
Flash Fujica II with a FUJINON 38mm/F2.8 lens

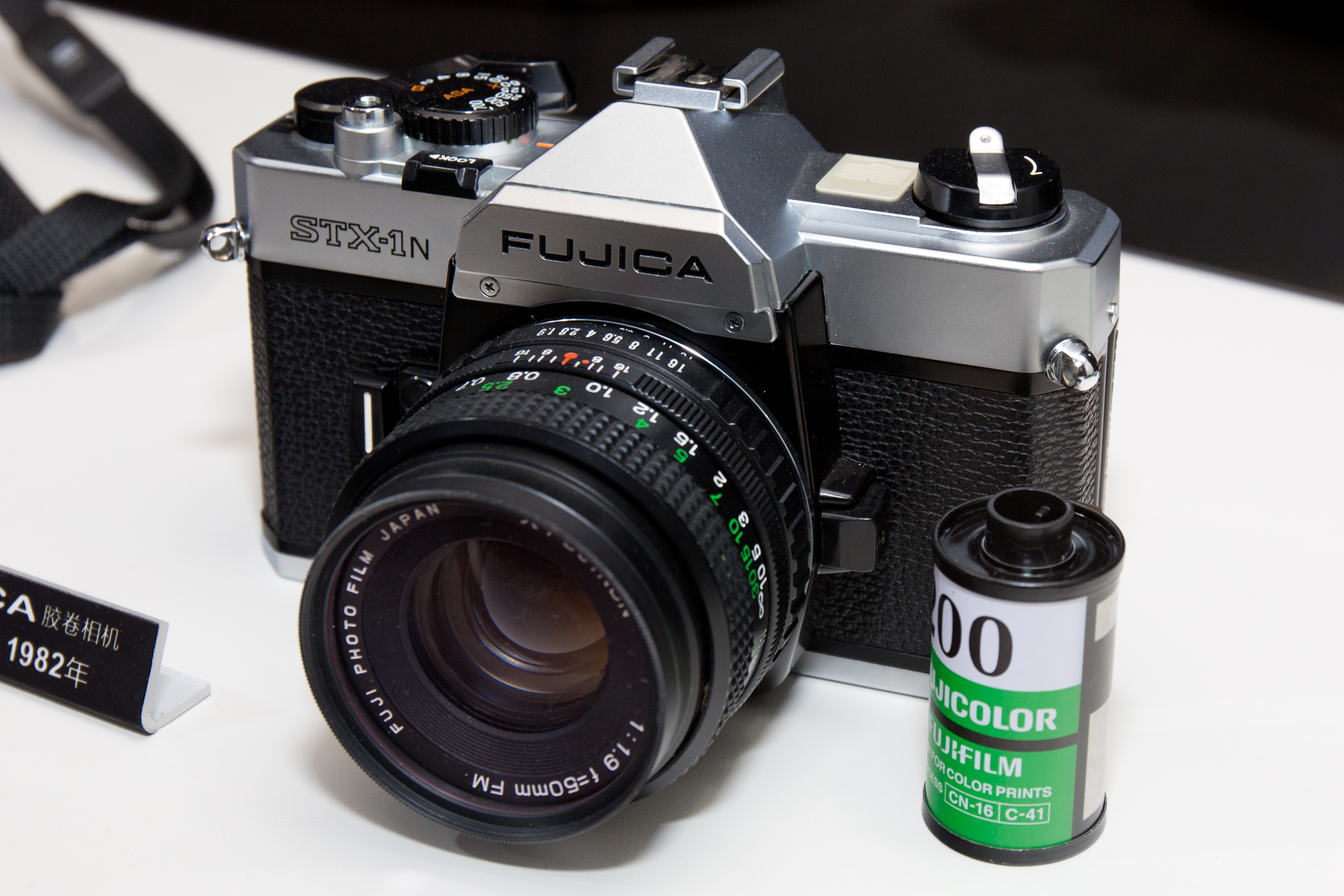
Fujica STX-1N

- Fujica AX-1 1980
- Fujica AX-3 1980
- Fujica AX-5 1980
- Fujica STX-1 1979
- Flash Fujica II 1978
- Fujica AZ-1 1978

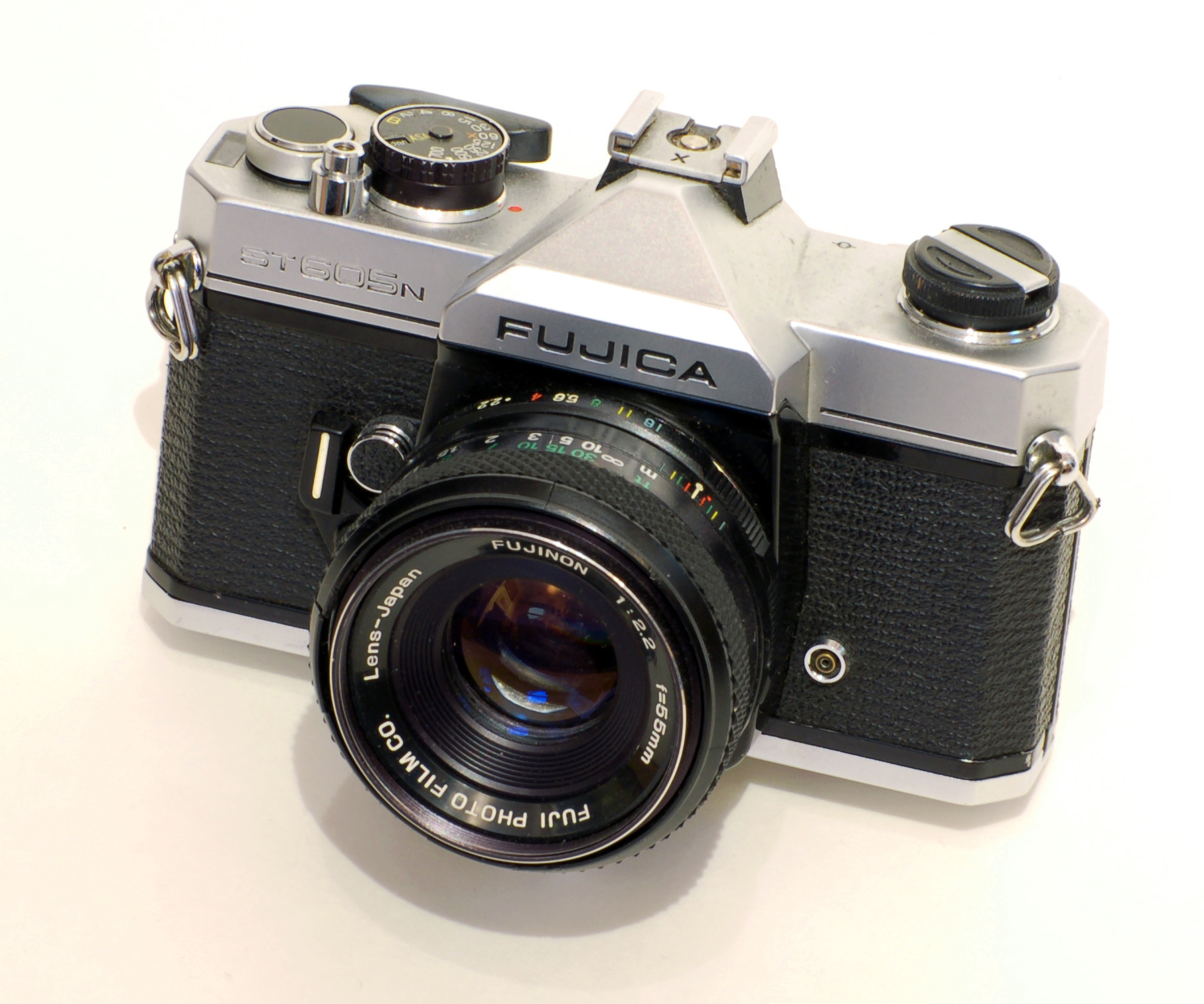
Fujica ST 605N

- Fujica ST 605N 1978
- Fujica ST 705W 1978
- Fujica ST 705 1977
- Fujica ST 601 1976
- Fujica ST 605 1976
- Fujica ST-F1975
- Fujica GEr 1974
- Fujica ST 901 1974
- Fujica ST 801 1973

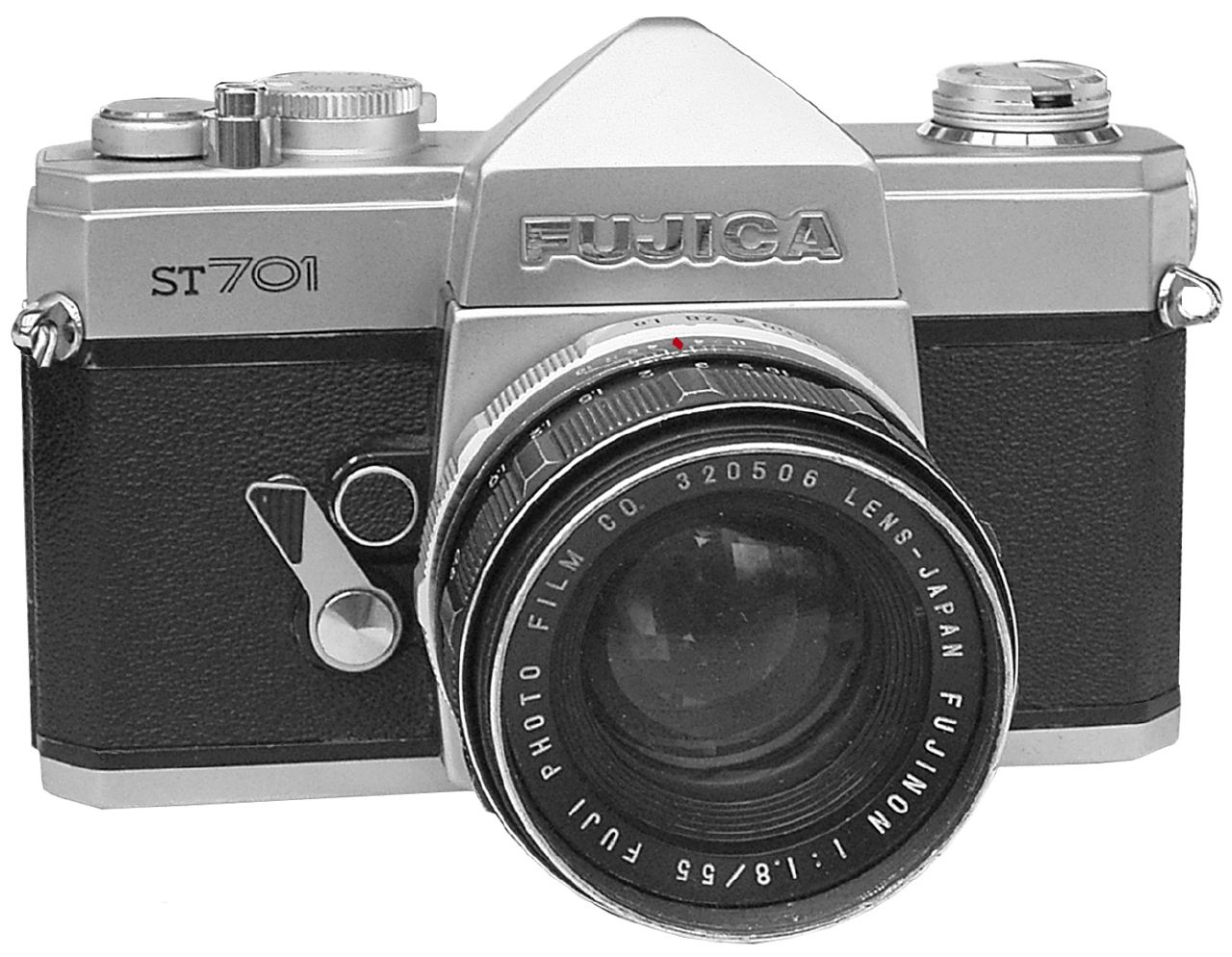
Fujica ST701

- Fujica ST 701 1971
- Fujica Compact Deluxe 1967
- Fujica Drive 1964
- Fujica Mini 1964
- Fujica V 2 1964
- Fujicarex II 1963
- Fujica 35 Auto-M 1962
- Fujicarex 1962
- Fujica 35 EE 1961

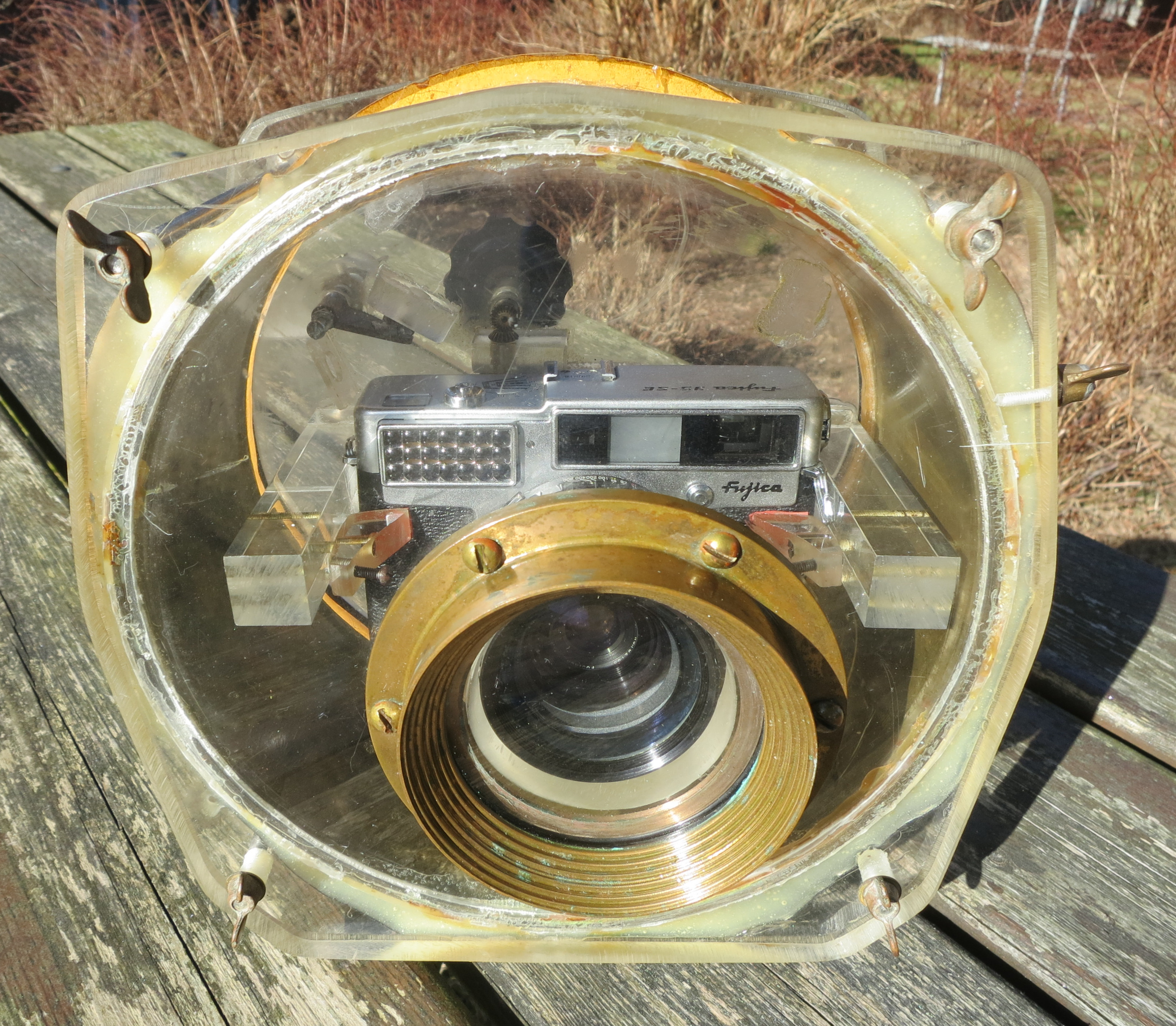
Fujica 35-SE in bespoke underwater housing

- Fujica 35 SE 1960
- Fujica 35 ML 1958
- Fujica 35 M 1957
- Fujicaflex 1954
- Fujica Six II BS 1950
- Fujica Six I BS 1948

== Lenses ==
=== Interchangeable lenses for 35mm cameras ===
- Fuji Photo Film X-FUJINON (F2.2/55mm)
- Fuji lenses for Leica and Nikon

== See also ==
- Fuji GX680
