= Planetary scanner =

A planetary scanner (also called an orbital scanner) is a type of image scanner for making scans of rare books and other easily damaged documents. In essence, such a scanner is a mounted camera taking photos of a well-lit environment. Originally, such scanners were expensive and could only be found in archives and museums, but with the availability of cheap, high-resolution digital cameras, DIY planetary scanners have become affordable, and for instance are being used by volunteer scan providers for Project Gutenberg.

Flatbed scanners often come in contact with at least part of the object to be scanned. They also require books to be fully opened most of the time (there are some exceptions where the scanning surface ends at the edge of the flatbed scanner, so that a book can be opened partially). Both practices can damage rare books; For example, opening a book 180 degrees can be damaging to its spine. These scanners are also implemented to scan other fragile documents such as old maps. However, planetary scanners that allow the book to open to a full 180 degrees have special features that protect the book binding from being damaged. Many of those scanners are equipped with self-balancing book cradles, gaps for the binding to be placed in, and pressure-sensitive glass controls. It is argued that by opening the book to a full 180 degrees and using scan glass, the scanner is able to capture further into the binding than those using a V cradle.

Planetary scanners tend to touch fewer parts of a book, and provide an option of only opening a book partially.

== See also ==
- Document camera
