= WolfVision =

WolfVision GmbH
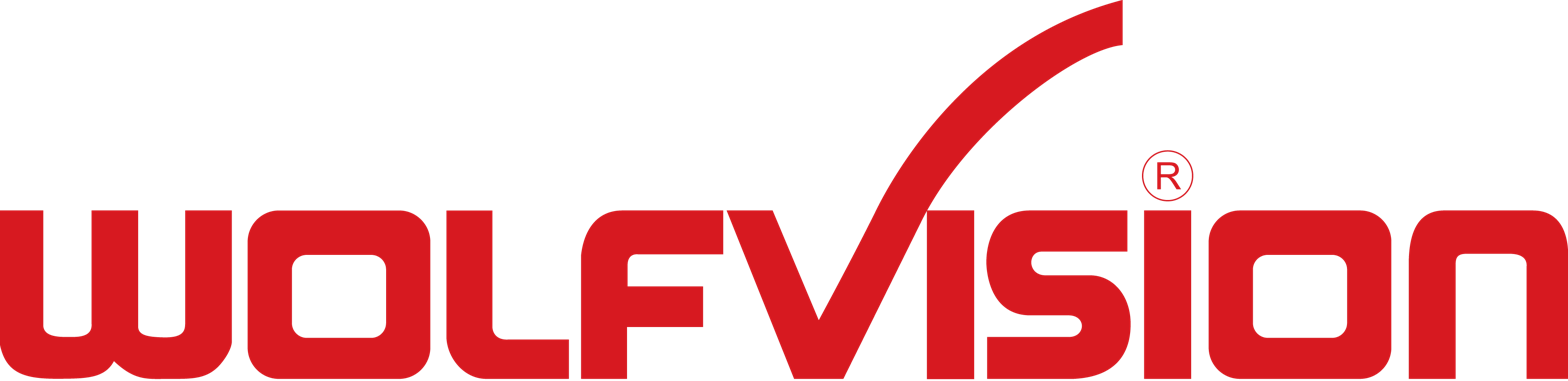

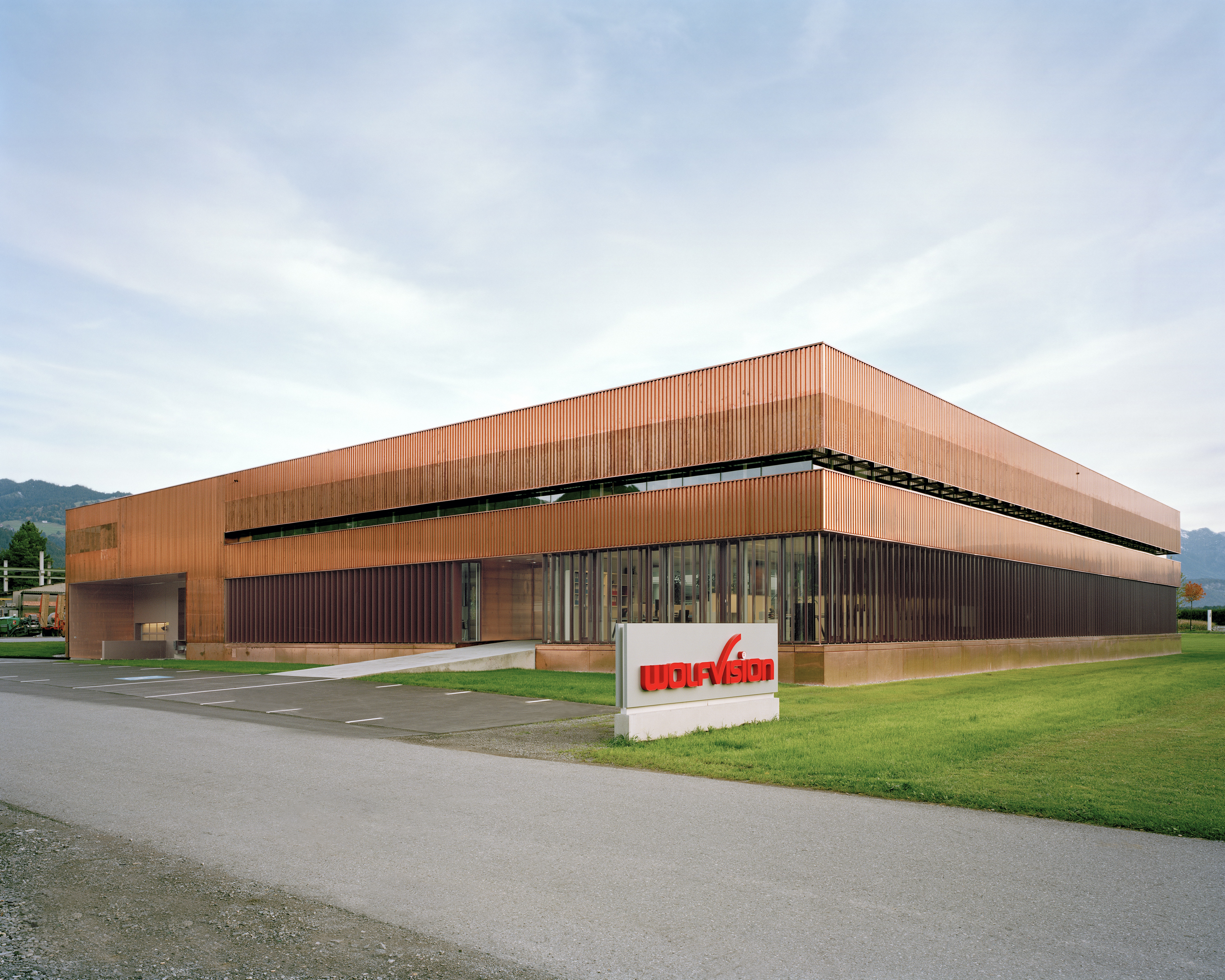
- WolfVision headquarter in Klaus
- Company type: Limited liability company (Gesellschaft mit beschränkter Haftung)
- Industry: Audiovisual
- Founded: 1966; 60 years ago
- Founder: Josef Wolf
- Headquarters: Klaus, Vorarlberg, Austria
- Area served: Worldwide
- Products: Visualizers (document cameras), Cynap solutions
- Website: www.wolfvision.com

WolfVision is an Austrian company that develops and manufactures presentation, collaboration, and knowledge sharing systems and solutions based in the Vorarlberg region of Austria. WolfVision Visualizer systems (also known as document cameras) are special optoelectronic devices designed to pick up images of 3-dimensional objects, documents, books, photos and other items from a non-reflective working surface, providing a high resolution output signal for video/data projectors, monitors, interactive whiteboards or videoconferencing systems.

Visualizer systems are used for making presentations in conferences, meetings, and training sessions. They are also used for displaying material in detail during videoconferencing and applications. In higher education environments, WolfVision's Visualizer products are used as a means of displaying lesson content materials on-screen during lectures and collaborative learning sessions. They are also used for lecture capture, for the recording of material for use in flipped classroom and blended learning situations.

== History ==
- 1966 – Josef Wolf founded "Wolf Audio-Visuals" which was one of the first companies operating in "the AV market".
- 1974 – Josef Wolf introduced an early version of the document camera. At this time all units were custom-made to order.
- 1978 – In cooperation with Carl Zeiss, Josef Wolf developed a video camera that could be connected to a microscope for microsurgery. This device made the first ever colour video recording of an eye operation on a live human patient.
- 1988 – Josef Wolf introduced the WolfVision Visualizer system. This was the world's first serial production Visualizer. It was first shown at the photokina Trade Fair in 1988.
- 1994 – Josef Wolf's sons, Georg Wolf and Martin Wolf set up WolfVision GmbH and concentrated 100% on the production of Visualizers.
- 2002/2007 – WolfVision GmbH Austria split into 3 separate companies, with WolfVision Holding AG, WolfVision GmbH Austria and WolfVision Innovation GmbH Austria.
- 2008 – WolfVision relocated to new company headquarters building in Klaus, Vorarlberg, Austria.
- 2013 – Launch of the VZ-C3D, the world's first stereoscopic 3D Visualizer.
- 2014 – WolfVision owners Georg and Martin Wolf take a step back from day-to-day company operations and join the Supervisory Board.
- 2015 – Launch of Cynap wireless presentation and collaboration system.
- 2016 – WolfVision GmbH and WolfVision Innovation GmbH merge to form a single company (WolfVision GmbH).

== Visualizer Systems ==
WolfVision manufactures Desktop and Ceiling Visualizer systems, and a Live Image Camera system called the EYE-14.

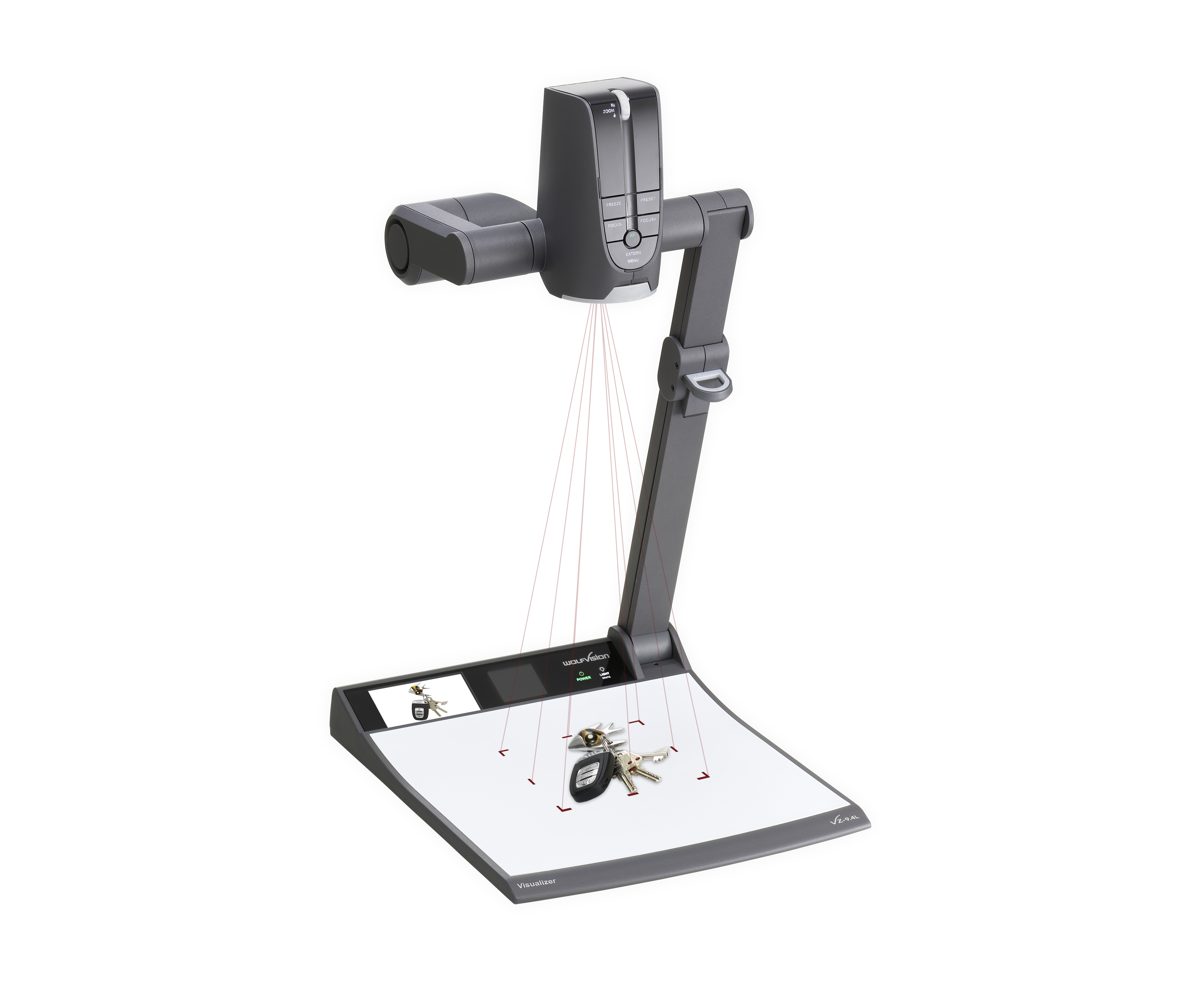
WolfVision VZ-9.4 Desktop Visualizer system

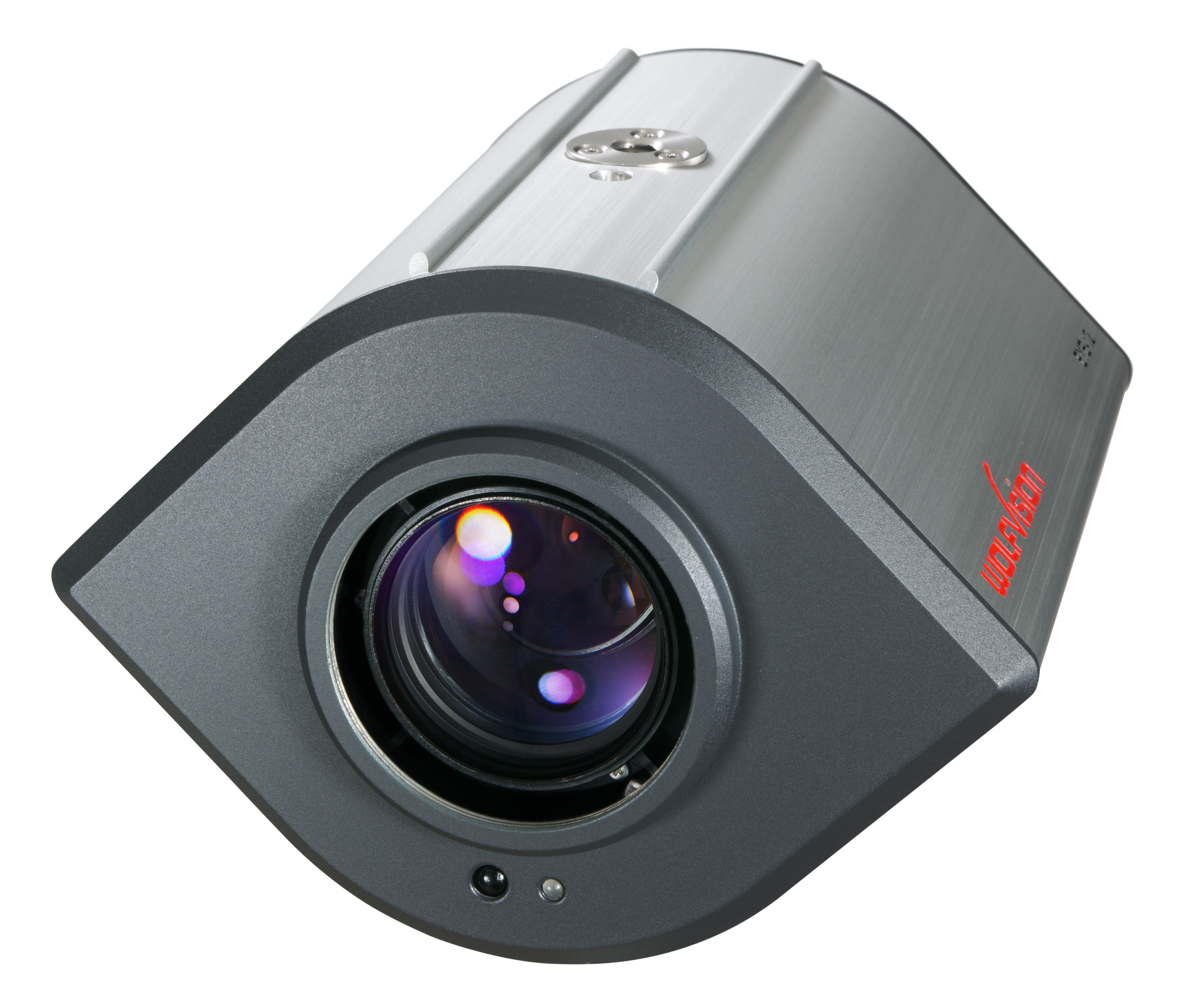
WolfVision EYE-14 Live Image Camera system

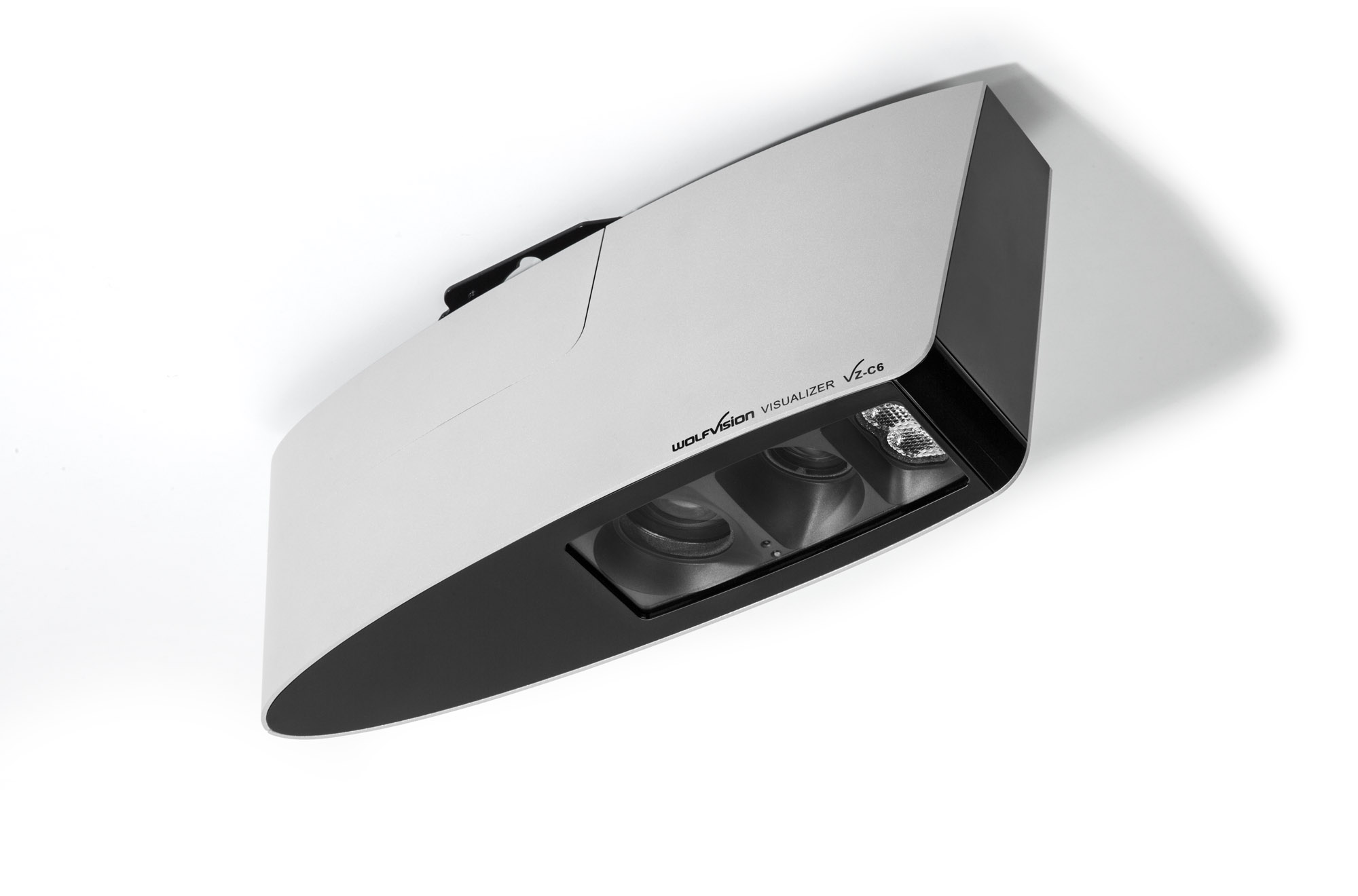
WolfVision VZ-C6 Ceiling Visualizer system

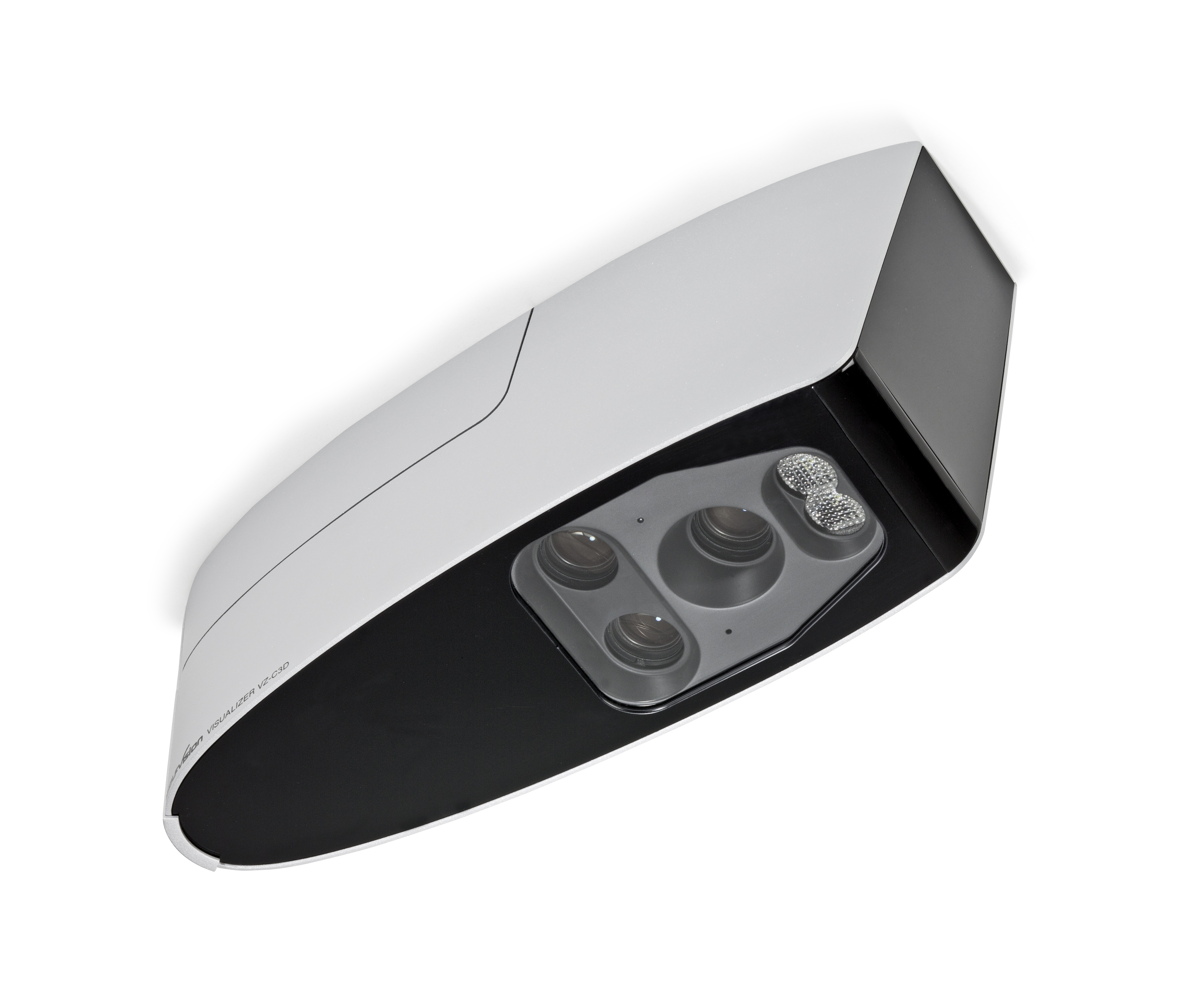
WolfVision VZ-C3D stereoscopic 3D Visualizer system

== Wireless Presentation and Collaboration Systems ==
WolfVision manufactures a range of Cynap solutions which allow digital content materials from laptops, smartphones and tablet PCs to be shown on a display screen or monitor. On-screen content can be streamed to remote locations, or recorded. The system is used either alone or in combination with a Visualizer during presentations, lectures, and collaborative learning sessions.

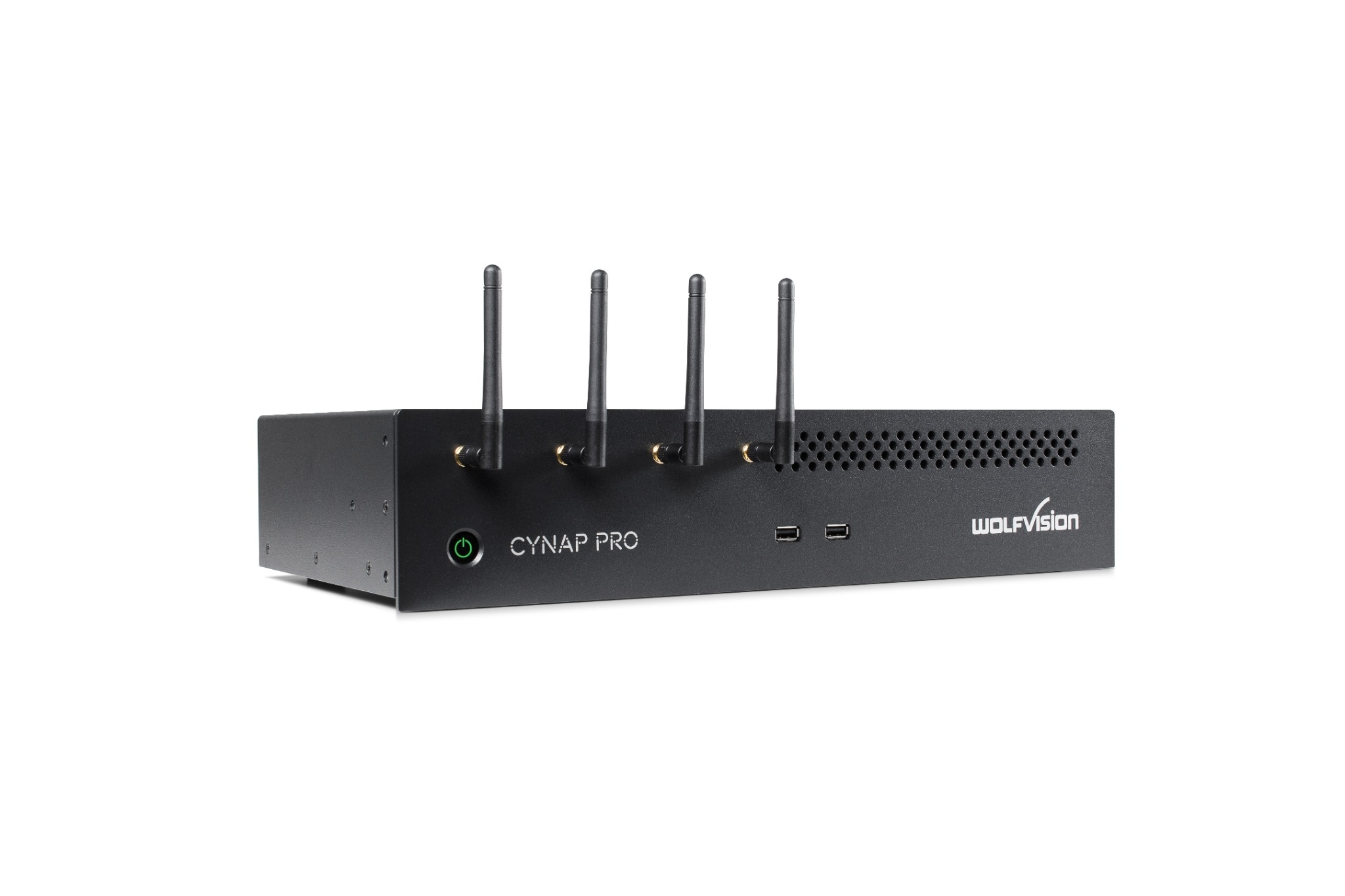
WolfVision Cynap Pro

== Awards ==
- 2010 – BTV-Bauherrenpreis for the new company headquarters building
- 2010 – Red dot design award: best of the best (for VZ-9plus³ Visualizer)
- 2010 – AV Award 2010 - Green/environmental activity of the year
- 2011 – InfoComm Green AV Award - for the implementation of environmentally sustainable practices in the workplace
