= Elmo (company) =

Japanese electronics and optics company

ELMO Co., Ltd.
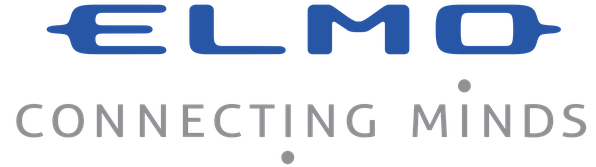
- Native name: 株式会社エルモ社
- Industry: Computer technology Computer software
- Founded: 1921; 105 years ago in Tokyo, Japan
- Founder: Hidenobu Sakaki
- Headquarters: Tokyo
- Area served: Worldwide
- Products: Interactive whiteboards Visualizers; Projectors; Audiovisuals
- Parent: Techno Horizon Group
- Website: www.elmousa.com (USA) elmoeurope.com (EUR) www.elmo.co.jp (JPN)

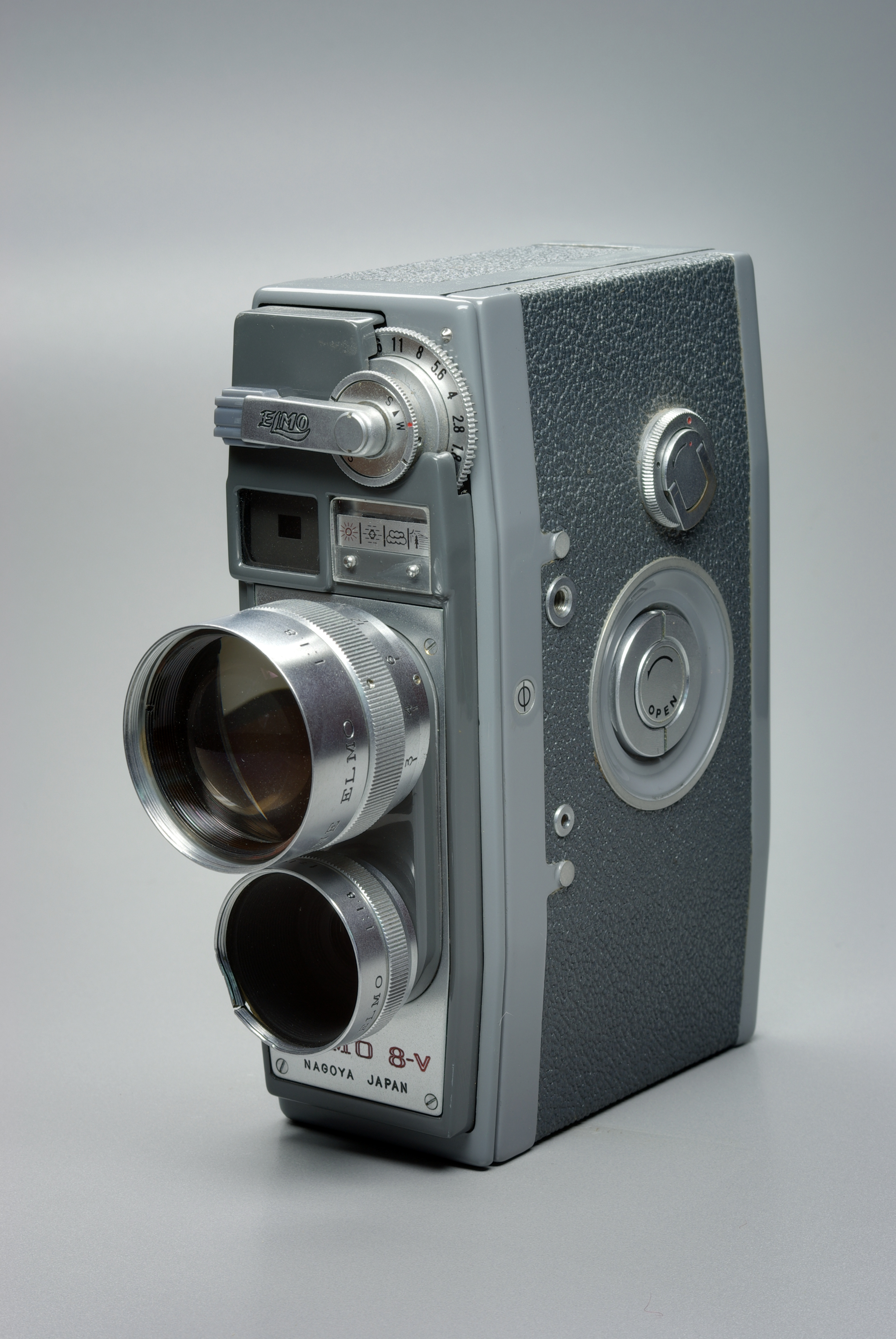
Elmo 8V (ca 1960)

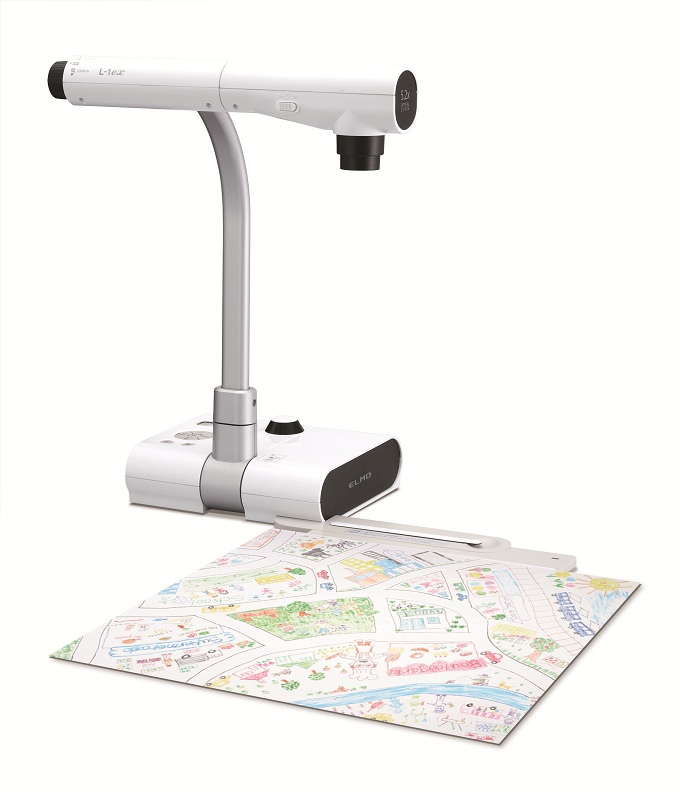
Elmo document camera

Elmo (Japanese: エルモ社) is a Japanese electronics and optics company that produces CCTV equipment (including CCD cameras), projectors, and other presentation devices. They are also well known for their series of high-end Super 8mm cameras and projectors during the 1970s.

== History ==
The company was founded in 1921 as Sakaki Shōkai (榊商会) by Hidenobu Sakaki. The company released its first 16mm projector (model A) in 1927, the first such device manufactured in Japan.

The company was renamed G.K. Elmo-sha (エルモ社, "Elmo & Co.") in 1933, an abbreviation for "Electricity Light Machine Organization". The first 8mm projector (model Hayabusa) was released three years later, in 1936, and the Elmoflex series of 6×6 TLR cameras was introduced in the early 1940s. However, production was quickly halted due to World War II.

Production resumed quickly after the war ended, and in January 1946, the Elmo company was one of the 17 founding members of the Optical and Precision Instruments Manufacturers' Association (光学精機工業協会, Kōgaku Seiki Kōgyō Kyōkai). The company was incorporated as K.K. Elmo-sha (エルモ社, "Elmo Co., Ltd.") in 1949. It continued making the Elmoflex until the second half of the 1950s, then dropped the production of still cameras. ELMO then continued producing 8mm products, introducing new Super 8 projectors and cameras to meet the then-new format. It was however not until the 1970s that the company would release its most famous products, namely their ST and GS-series of Super 8 projectors, including the GS-800, GS-1200 and ST-1200HD, the three of which often are regarded as the company's crown jewels in terms of projectors. As home video took its toll on the Super 8 scene, ELMO ceased production of their projectors, with the final models being the GS-1200 P Xenon and P Com in 1983. Following this, the company began making CCD cameras in 1984, introduced the EV-308 document camera in 1988, and in the late 90s moved into educational technical equipment.

In 2010, The Elmo Company merged with Tietech to establish Techno Horizon Group, Ltd. The Company has since managed subsidiaries engaging in development, manufacturing, and distribution of telecommunication, factory automation and image information equipment.

As of 2021, the company still produces educational equipment for teachers and schools, with separate departments in USA, Japan and Europe.
