= Fujica X-mount =

Camera lens mount

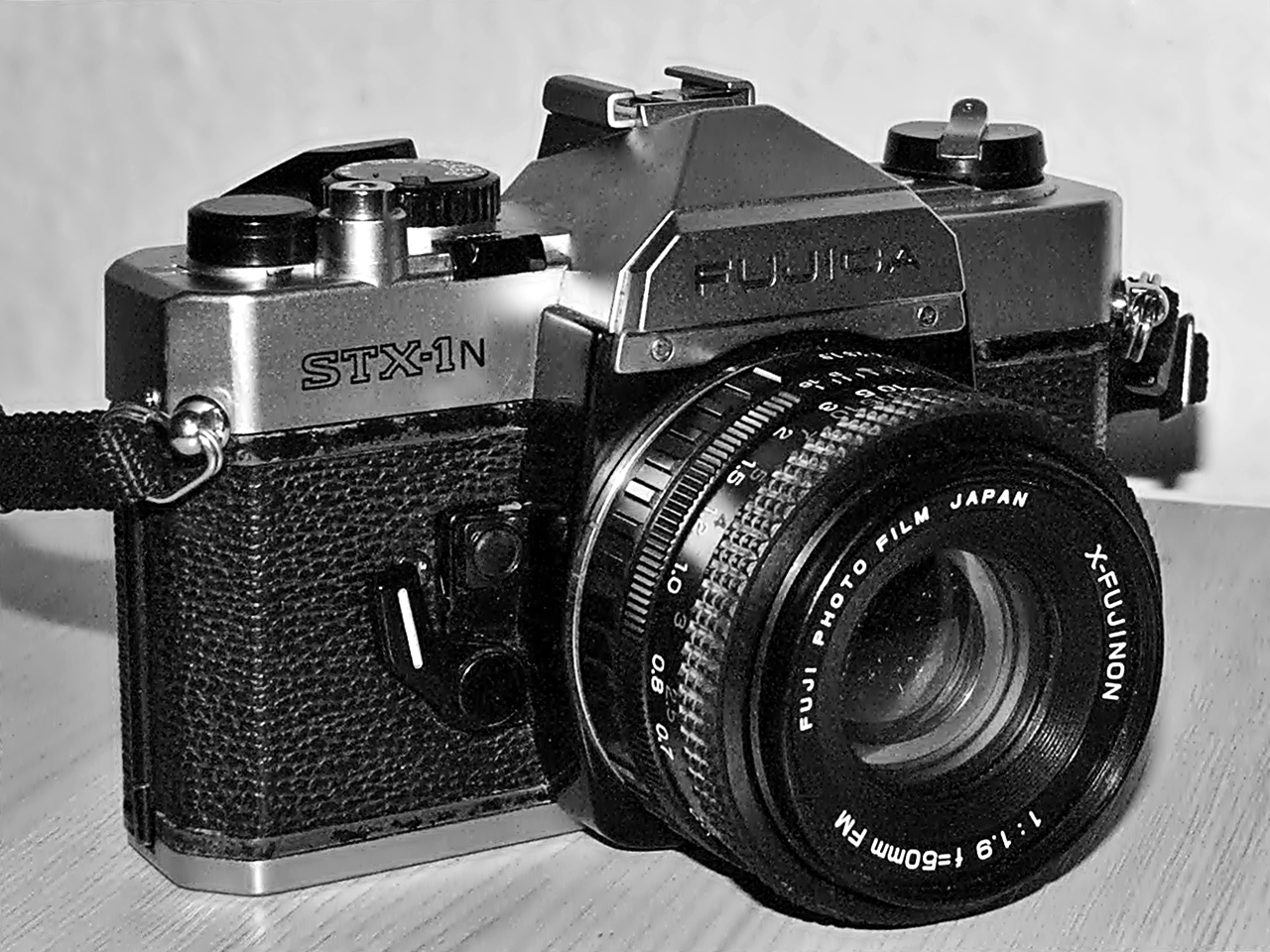
Fujica X-mount

The Fujica X-mount was a lens mount created by Fujifilm in the late 1970s and early 1980s for the new Fujica SLR lineup: AX-1, AX-3, AX-5, AX Multi, STX-1, STX-1N, STX-2, MPF105X, MPF105XN. It replaced the M42 screw mount used on their earlier SLRs.

The mount is a bayonet type, with a 65° clockwise lock, and a flange focal distance of 43.5 mm.

With the advent of autofocus, the Fujica series of 35 mm SLR cameras was discontinued in 1985, rendering this mount obsolete. Fuji would return to the SLR market in 2000 with a series of digital SLR cameras starting with the FinePix S1 Pro, but these were based on Nikon designs and used the autofocus version of the Nikon F-mount.

== Fujifilm X-Fujinon lenses ==
Fujifilm introduced a line of twenty-seven X-Fujinon lenses with this mount as well as three X-Fujinar lenses, as listed in the following table. In the lens names, EBC indicates a multi-layer Electron Beam Coating.

X-Fujinon and X-Fujinar lenses for Fujica X-mount cameras
Name	Img	FL (mm)	Ap	Const. (grp/ele)	Angle	Min. focus	Dims. (Φ×L)	Wgt.	Filter (mm)	Notes & refs.
Ultra wide and fisheye lenses
EBC X-Fujinon·F 16mm f/2.8 DM		16	f/2.8–16	8/12	180°	0.2 m (0.7 ft)	74×56 mm (2.9×2.2 in)	408 g (14.4 oz)	(built-in)	Full-frame fisheye
EBC X-Fujinon·SW 19mm f/3.5 DM		19	f/3.5–16	8/11	96°	0.25 m (0.8 ft)	75×51 mm (3.0×2.0 in)	265 g (9.3 oz)	72	
Wide-angle lenses
EBC X-Fujinon·W 24mm f/2.8 DM		24	f/2.8–16	8/9	84°	0.25 m (0.8 ft)	61.5×45.5 mm (2.4×1.8 in)	195 g (6.9 oz)	49	
EBC X-Fujinon·W 28mm f/1.9 DM		28	1.9|22}}-->style="background: var(--background-color-interactive, #EEE); color: var(--color-base, black); vertical-align: middle; text-align: center; " class="table-Unknown" | ?	?	74°	0.3|m|ft|1}}-->style="background: var(--background-color-interactive, #EEE); color: var(--color-base, black); vertical-align: middle; text-align: center; " class="table-Unknown" | ?	62|*|41|mm|in|1}}-->style="background: var(--background-color-interactive, #EEE); color: var(--color-base, black); vertical-align: middle; text-align: center; " class="table-Unknown" | ?	160|g|oz}}-->style="background: var(--background-color-interactive, #EEE); color: var(--color-base, black); vertical-align: middle; text-align: center; " class="table-Unknown" | ?	?	
X-Fujinar·W 28mm f/2.8 DM		28	2.8|22}}-->style="background: var(--background-color-interactive, #EEE); color: var(--color-base, black); vertical-align: middle; text-align: center; " class="table-Unknown" | ?	?	74°	0.3|m|ft|1}}-->style="background: var(--background-color-interactive, #EEE); color: var(--color-base, black); vertical-align: middle; text-align: center; " class="table-Unknown" | ?	62|*|41|mm|in|1}}-->style="background: var(--background-color-interactive, #EEE); color: var(--color-base, black); vertical-align: middle; text-align: center; " class="table-Unknown" | ?	160|g|oz}}-->style="background: var(--background-color-interactive, #EEE); color: var(--color-base, black); vertical-align: middle; text-align: center; " class="table-Unknown" | ?	?	
EBC X-Fujinon·W 28mm f/3.5 DM		28	f/3.5–16	5/5	74°	0.3 m (1.0 ft)	61.5×41.0 mm (2.4×1.6 in)	160 g (5.6 oz)	49	
X-Fujinon·Z 29–47mm f/3.5~4.2 DM		29–47	f/3.5~4.2–22	8/8	74–50°	0.6 m (2.0 ft)	64.5×52.0 mm (2.5×2.0 in)	285 g (10.1 oz)	55	
EBC X-Fujinon·W 35mm f/1.9 DM		35	1.9|22}}-->style="background: var(--background-color-interactive, #EEE); color: var(--color-base, black); vertical-align: middle; text-align: center; " class="table-Unknown" | ?	?	63°	0.3|m|ft|1}}-->style="background: var(--background-color-interactive, #EEE); color: var(--color-base, black); vertical-align: middle; text-align: center; " class="table-Unknown" | ?	62|*|41|mm|in|1}}-->style="background: var(--background-color-interactive, #EEE); color: var(--color-base, black); vertical-align: middle; text-align: center; " class="table-Unknown" | ?	160|g|oz}}-->style="background: var(--background-color-interactive, #EEE); color: var(--color-base, black); vertical-align: middle; text-align: center; " class="table-Unknown" | ?	?	
EBC X-Fujinon·W 35mm f/2.8 DM		35	f/2.8–16	6/7	63°	0.35 m (1.1 ft)	61.5×46.0 mm (2.4×1.8 in)	190 g (6.7 oz)	49	
Normal lenses
EBC X-Fujinon·Z 35–70mm f/2.8~3.7 DM		35–70	2.8~3.7|22}}-->style="background: var(--background-color-interactive, #EEE); color: var(--color-base, black); vertical-align: middle; text-align: center; " class="table-Unknown" | ?	?	63–35°	0.3|m|ft|1}}-->style="background: var(--background-color-interactive, #EEE); color: var(--color-base, black); vertical-align: middle; text-align: center; " class="table-Unknown" | ?	62|*|41|mm|in|1}}-->style="background: var(--background-color-interactive, #EEE); color: var(--color-base, black); vertical-align: middle; text-align: center; " class="table-Unknown" | ?	160|g|oz}}-->style="background: var(--background-color-interactive, #EEE); color: var(--color-base, black); vertical-align: middle; text-align: center; " class="table-Unknown" | ?	?	with Macro
X-Fujinon·Z 43–75mm f/3.5~4.5 DM		43–75	f/3.5~4.5–22	7/7	54–32°	1.2 m (3.9 ft)	64.0×62.5 mm (2.5×2.5 in)	310 g (11 oz)	49	
EBC X-Fujinon 50mm f/1.2 DM		50	f/1.2–16	7/7	45°	0.45 m (1.5 ft)	66×50 mm (2.6×2.0 in)	300 g (11 oz)	55	
X-Fujinon 50mm f/1.6 DM		50	f/1.6–16	6/6	48°	0.6 m (2.0 ft)	61.5×36.5 mm (2.4×1.4 in)	175 g (6.2 oz)	49	
EBC X-Fujinon 50mm f/1.6 DM		50	f/1.6–16	6/6	48°	0.6 m (2.0 ft)	61.5×36.5 mm (2.4×1.4 in)	175 g (6.2 oz)	49	
X-Fujinon 50mm f/1.9 DM		50	1.9|22}}-->style="background: var(--background-color-interactive, #EEE); color: var(--color-base, black); vertical-align: middle; text-align: center; " class="table-Unknown" | ?	?	48°	0.3|m|ft|1}}-->style="background: var(--background-color-interactive, #EEE); color: var(--color-base, black); vertical-align: middle; text-align: center; " class="table-Unknown" | ?	62|*|41|mm|in|1}}-->style="background: var(--background-color-interactive, #EEE); color: var(--color-base, black); vertical-align: middle; text-align: center; " class="table-Unknown" | ?	160|g|oz}}-->style="background: var(--background-color-interactive, #EEE); color: var(--color-base, black); vertical-align: middle; text-align: center; " class="table-Unknown" | ?	?	
X-Fujinon 50mm f/1.9 FM		50	1.9|22}}-->style="background: var(--background-color-interactive, #EEE); color: var(--color-base, black); vertical-align: middle; text-align: center; " class="table-Unknown" | ?	?	48°	0.3|m|ft|1}}-->style="background: var(--background-color-interactive, #EEE); color: var(--color-base, black); vertical-align: middle; text-align: center; " class="table-Unknown" | ?	62|*|41|mm|in|1}}-->style="background: var(--background-color-interactive, #EEE); color: var(--color-base, black); vertical-align: middle; text-align: center; " class="table-Unknown" | ?	160|g|oz}}-->style="background: var(--background-color-interactive, #EEE); color: var(--color-base, black); vertical-align: middle; text-align: center; " class="table-Unknown" | ?	?	
X-Fujinon 55mm f/1.6 DM		55	f/1.6–16	4/5	43°	0.45 m (1.5 ft)	61.5×51.0 mm (2.4×2.0 in)	275 g (9.7 oz)	49	
EBC X-Fujinon 55mm f/1.6 DM		55	f/1.6–16	4/5	43°	0.45 m (1.5 ft)	61.5×51.0 mm (2.4×2.0 in)	275 g (9.7 oz)	49	
X-Fujinon 55mm f/2.2		55	f/2.2–16	4/4	43°	0.6 m (2.0 ft)	61.5×37.0 mm (2.4×1.5 in)	130 g (4.6 oz)	49	
EBC X-Fujinon·M 55mm f/3.5 DM		55	f/3.5–22	4/5	43°	0.24 m (0.8 ft)	61.5×53.5 mm (2.4×2.1 in)	202 g (7.1 oz)	49	Macro
Portrait lenses
EBC X-Fujinon·Z 70–140mm f/4~4.5 DM		70–140	4~4.5|22}}-->style="background: var(--background-color-interactive, #EEE); color: var(--color-base, black); vertical-align: middle; text-align: center; " class="table-Unknown" | ?	?	35–18°	0.3|m|ft|1}}-->style="background: var(--background-color-interactive, #EEE); color: var(--color-base, black); vertical-align: middle; text-align: center; " class="table-Unknown" | ?	62|*|41|mm|in|1}}-->style="background: var(--background-color-interactive, #EEE); color: var(--color-base, black); vertical-align: middle; text-align: center; " class="table-Unknown" | ?	160|g|oz}}-->style="background: var(--background-color-interactive, #EEE); color: var(--color-base, black); vertical-align: middle; text-align: center; " class="table-Unknown" | ?	?	with Macro
EBC X-Fujinon·Z 75–150mm f/4.5 DM		75–150	f/4.5–22	9/12	33–16°	1.8 m (5.9 ft)	69.5×144.5 mm (2.7×5.7 in)	715 g (25.2 oz)	62	
X-Fujinar·Z 80–200mm f/3.8 DM		80–200	3.8|22}}-->style="background: var(--background-color-interactive, #EEE); color: var(--color-base, black); vertical-align: middle; text-align: center; " class="table-Unknown" | ?	?	?	0.3|m|ft|1}}-->style="background: var(--background-color-interactive, #EEE); color: var(--color-base, black); vertical-align: middle; text-align: center; " class="table-Unknown" | ?	62|*|41|mm|in|1}}-->style="background: var(--background-color-interactive, #EEE); color: var(--color-base, black); vertical-align: middle; text-align: center; " class="table-Unknown" | ?	160|g|oz}}-->style="background: var(--background-color-interactive, #EEE); color: var(--color-base, black); vertical-align: middle; text-align: center; " class="table-Unknown" | ?	?	
EBC X-Fujinon·Z 85–225mm f/4.5 DM		85–225	f/4.5–22	9/12	28–11°	1.6 m (5.2 ft)	71×155 mm (2.8×6.1 in)	720 g (25 oz)	55	
EBC X-Fujinon·T 100mm f/2.8 DM		100	f/2.8–22	4/5	24°	1.0 m (3.3 ft)	61.5×61.5 mm (2.4×2.4 in)	245 g (8.6 oz)	49	
EBC X-Fujinon·T 135mm f/2.5 DM		135	f/2.5–22	4/5	18°	1.5 m (4.9 ft)	67×83 mm (2.6×3.3 in)	425 g (15.0 oz)	58	
X-Fujinar·T 135mm f/2.8 DM		135	2.8|22}}-->style="background: var(--background-color-interactive, #EEE); color: var(--color-base, black); vertical-align: middle; text-align: center; " class="table-Unknown" | ?	?	18°	0.3|m|ft|1}}-->style="background: var(--background-color-interactive, #EEE); color: var(--color-base, black); vertical-align: middle; text-align: center; " class="table-Unknown" | ?	62|*|41|mm|in|1}}-->style="background: var(--background-color-interactive, #EEE); color: var(--color-base, black); vertical-align: middle; text-align: center; " class="table-Unknown" | ?	160|g|oz}}-->style="background: var(--background-color-interactive, #EEE); color: var(--color-base, black); vertical-align: middle; text-align: center; " class="table-Unknown" | ?	?	
EBC X-Fujinon·T 135mm f/3.5 DM		135	f/3.5–22	4/4	18°	1.5 m (4.9 ft)	61.5×79.0 mm (2.4×3.1 in)	290 g (10 oz)	49	
Telephoto lenses
EBC X-Fujinon·T 200mm f/4.5 DM		200	f/4.5–22	5/5	12°	2.5 m (8.2 ft)	64.5×134.0 mm (2.5×5.3 in)	490 g (17 oz)	49	
EBC X-Fujinon·T 400mm f/4.5		400	f/4.5–45	4/5	6°	8 m (26 ft)	101.0×291.5 mm (4.0×11.5 in)	1,940 g (4.3 lb)	49	Manual diaphragm

Not on that list are the following lenses:

- EBC X-Fujinon SW 28mm 1:1.9 DM
- EBC X-Fujinon W 35mm 1:1.9 DM
- X-Fujinon 50mm 1:1.9 DM
- EBC X-Fujinon 55mm 1:1.6 DM
- X-Fujinon 55mm 1:1.6 DM
- EBC X-Fujinon Z 35-70mm 1:2.8-3.7 DM
- EBC X-Fujinon Z 70-140mm 1:4-4.5 DM

The Fujinar lenses are:

- X-Fujinar W 28mm 1:2.8 DM
- X-Fujinar T 135mm 1:2.8 DM
- X-Fujinar Z 80-200mm 1:3.8 DM

The lens without a "DM" suffix are limited to aperture priority and manual exposure modes with the AX-5 SLR; program and shutter priority exposure modes are not available.

== Accessories ==
There were some accessories that complied with Fujica X-mount:

- The "mount adapter X-S and X-D" for M42 lenses.
- Two extension tubes : X25 (25 mm) and X50 (50 mm).
- The "auto bellows X" used with a 50 mm lens can provide 1 to 3× magnification. It can also be used with the "focusing rail X". The Fujica "slide copier X" mounted on the "focusing rail X" simplifies the copying of 135 film pictures.
- The "macro cine copy X" is a macro lens with specific windows to take copies from 8 mm and 16 mm films.
- The "microscope adapter X" to adapt the camera body to a microscope.
- A "reverse adapter X", that can be mounted with an extension tube.
- A classic "teleconverter 2X".
- Fuji Photo Recorder back. This data back was interchangeable with the standard camera back and was equipped with a hand-writing pen that is inter-linked with a "light pen" for printing in data (up to 80 characters) in the bottom-left corner of the image. The back can be easily detached by pushing down on the hinge pin.

== See also ==
- Fujifilm X-mount
