= Single-8 =

Motion picture film format

Single-8 film cartridges

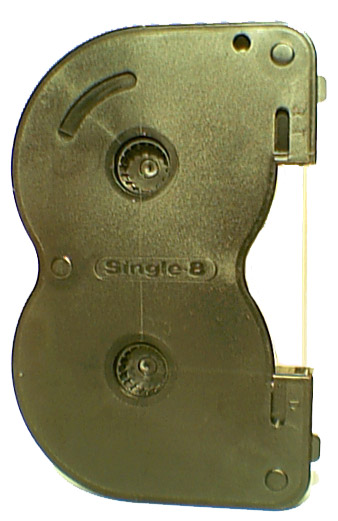
Rear side (facing camera)

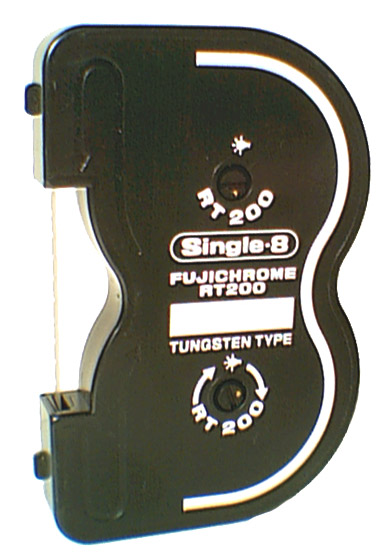
Front side (facing film door)

Single-8, also known as 8 mm Type S, Model II, is a motion picture film format introduced by Fujifilm of Japan in 1965 as an alternative to the Kodak Super 8 format. Single-8 and Super 8 use mutually incompatible cartridges, but the 8 mm film within each cartridge shares the same frame and perforation size and arrangement, so developed Single-8 and Super 8 films can be shown using the same projection equipment.

Although never as popular internationally as Super 8, the format continued to live in parallel. Fuji discontinued the manufacture of Single-8 film by 2012. The two final Single-8 film cartridge types produced by Fuji were Fujichrome R25N, discontinued in 2012, and Fujichrome RT200N, discontinued in 2010.

== History ==
Both Single-8 and Super 8 were launched in 1965. The company Konan, also known for developing the Konan-16 subminiature camera, claims in its history page to have developed the Single-8 system in 1959. Single-8 proved to be quite successful in Japan, capturing 80–85% of the domestic market for home movies until 1973, but in the United States and other parts of the world, the Super 8 was the dominant format, in part due to Kodak's influence. At least one camera was made which accepted both Single-8 and Super 8: the Honeywell Elmo Tri-Filmatic Super 100, manufactured in Japan by Elmo and sold in different countries as the Elmo C300, which uses interchangeable magazines for Regular (Double) 8, Super 8, Single-8, and 100-ft reels of Double Super 8.

Fuji announced it would cease production of 8 mm film in 2006, but reversed that decision in 2007. At the time, Fuji was manufacturing two versions of Single-8 film: Fujichrome R25N, a daylight-balanced (5500 K) filmstock, and Fujichrome RT200N, a tungsten-balanced (3400 K) for indoor filming. The Sound Film brand is no longer made, although a magnetic sound stripe could be added to the film after processing. This option was chosen whenever sending the exposed film to Fuji in Japan for processing. Fuji discontinued sales of Single-8 film in March 2012 and stopped processing exposed film in 2013.

In addition to the Fuji color films, black and white film is available from Japanese company Retro Enterprises. This Single-8 black & white reversal film, named Retro X, is film speed 200 and is manufactured in Germany.

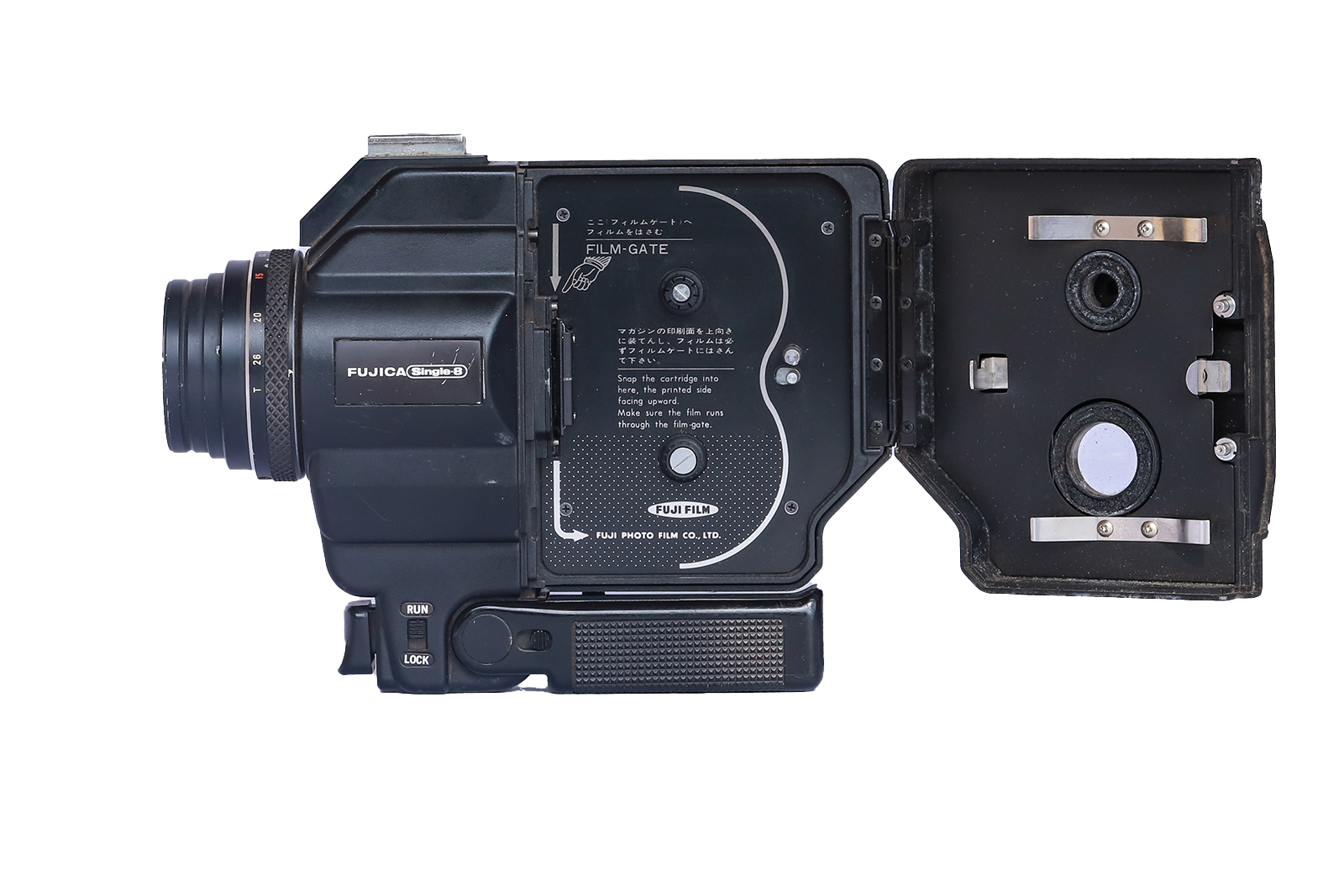
Fujica ZX250 Single-8 movie camera, with film chamber open

Although Fujifilm stopped exportation of Single-8 Film to other countries, individual companies in the United States and Europe import the filmstock independently. Single-8 is readily available in its home country of Japan where even used cameras can reach high prices in online auctions on Yahoo! Japan. For example, a used Fujica ZC1000, the top-of-the-line Single-8 camera, can fetch prices upwards to 250,000 Japanese yen (approx $2900).

Daicon Film of Japan (now Gainax) produced a series of well-known tokusatsu films in the 1980s using Single-8 film, some of which are now available on DVD.

== Details ==
Single-8 film uses a polyester base, which is 2/3 the thickness of tri-acetate Super 8, but the films within the incompatible cartridge systems are otherwise identical, incorporating the same dimensions for sprocket holes and image size, which means developed Single-8 can be projected in Super 8 projectors and vice versa. While the Single-8 film is more resistant to breakage, it tends to stretch if the film transport jams. Due to the difference in film base thickness, splicing the two formats together in a finished film may require adjustment of the projector's focus at the join.

Like Super 8, unexposed Single-8 film comes pre-loaded in plastic cartridges; the B-shaped Single-8 cartridge uses two separate, coplanar spools for supply and take-up, unlike Super 8, in which the spools are coaxial. As a result, Single-8 film offered unlimited rewind, whereas Super 8 rewind was limited to several seconds, as there is no external connection to turn the supply spool; Super 8 cameras with rewind rely on having sufficient empty space within the cartridge for the rewound film to pile up inside, but in general, they are limited to approximately 100 frames of rewind in total. Rewinding enables in-camera special effects, including dissolves, multiple exposures, and title sequences. The Super 8 cartridge is not designed to be reloaded, but the Single-8 cartridge can be reloaded; Single-8 film is extracted by unpeeling two pieces of tape to separate the cartridge halves.

The Single 8 cartridge was designed with an open section for the film, allowing it to be fed between the pressure pad and film gate, both part of the camera, during exposure. This contrasts with the Kodak system which had a plastic pressure plate built into the cartridge. It was believed that Single-8 offered superior film positioning, but the reality was that Super 8's plastic pressure plate could be moulded with far smaller tolerance than Single 8's metal version could be machined.

Fuji offered on-film optical sound recording rather than a magnetic stripe; this system required the user to draw additional film out of the cassette.

=== Mechanical ===
Single-8 cartridges are nominally 66 mm (2.60 in) wide, 102 mm (4.02 in) high, and 13 mm (0.512 in) thick, according to the governing ISO standard. There are three round mounting bosses on one surface to help locate the cartridge within the camera. In addition, like the notches on Super 8 cartridges, the Single-8 cartridge has several tabs, slots, and holes to automatically set film speed and type.

Single-8 cartridge with relevant indicators: s1: Film speed indication tab; position relative to surface (T* dimension) varies with film speed.; s2: Film speed indication grooves; length of groove (J* or θ*) varies with film speed.; ID1: Film type / filter indication hole; ID2: Film type / filter indication tab

Single-8 cartridge film speed indicators
Film speed		Dimensions		
DIN	ASA	θ*	J*	T*
13	16	22°	51.0 mm (2.01 in)	11.6 mm (0.457 in)
14	20	26°	50.5 mm (1.99 in)	10.85 mm (0.427 in)
15	25	30°	50.0 mm (1.97 in)	10.10 mm (0.398 in)
16	32	34°	49.5 mm (1.95 in)	9.35 mm (0.368 in)
17	40	38°	49.0 mm (1.93 in)	8.60 mm (0.339 in)
18	50	42°	48.5 mm (1.91 in)	7.85 mm (0.309 in)
19	64	46°	48.0 mm (1.89 in)	7.10 mm (0.280 in)
20	80	50°	47.5 mm (1.87 in)	6.35 mm (0.250 in)
21	100	54°	47.0 mm (1.85 in)	5.60 mm (0.220 in)
22	125	58°	46.5 mm (1.83 in)	4.85 mm (0.191 in)
23	160	62°	46.0 mm (1.81 in)	4.10 mm (0.161 in)
24	200	66°	45.5 mm (1.79 in)	3.35 mm (0.132 in)
25	250	70°	45.0 mm (1.77 in)	2.60 mm (0.102 in)
26	320	74°	44.5 mm (1.75 in)	1.85 mm (0.073 in)
27	400	78°	44.0 mm (1.73 in)	1.10 mm (0.043 in)

=== Processing Single-8 Film ===
Fuji's Single-8 developing process is not the same as Process EM-26, but is similar. There is more involved in the removal of the remjet antihalation backing than the now long discontinued Kodak Ektachrome Process EM-26 films. The color chemistry, while close, is slightly different, particularly the color development.

It was often recommended to send Fuji Single-8 film to Fujifilm in Japan for processing, however processing ended in 2013.

== See also ==
- List of film formats
