= Document camera =

Real-time image capture devices for displaying an object to a large audience

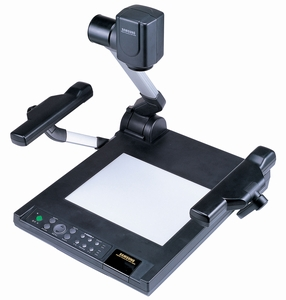
Samsung SDP-6500DX Document Camera

A document camera, also known as a visual presenter, visualizer, digital overhead, docu-cam, or simply a doc-cam, is a high-resolution image capturing device used to display objects in real-time to a large audience, such as in a classroom or lecture hall. It can also function as an alternative to a traditional image scanner for digitizing documents for archival or digital storage.

The camera is typically mounted on an adjustable arm, allowing it to be positioned over a document or an object. It connects to a projector or a similar video display system, enabling the presenter to display text, images, or objects to the audience. Larger objects can be placed in front of the camera, which can then be rotated as needed.

== Use cases ==
Document cameras are used in various settings, including:

- Lecture halls and classrooms.
- Presentations at conferences, meetings, and training sessions.
- Videoconferencing and telepresence.
- Presentation of evidence in courtrooms.
- Medical applications (telemedicine, telepathology, display of radiology images).

Document cameras have replaced overhead projectors in many applications. A document camera can enlarge small print and project a printed page. Unlike many overhead projectors, which typically require dimmed lighting, document cameras can often be used effectively in well-lit rooms. Most document cameras can also send a video signal to a computer.

== History ==
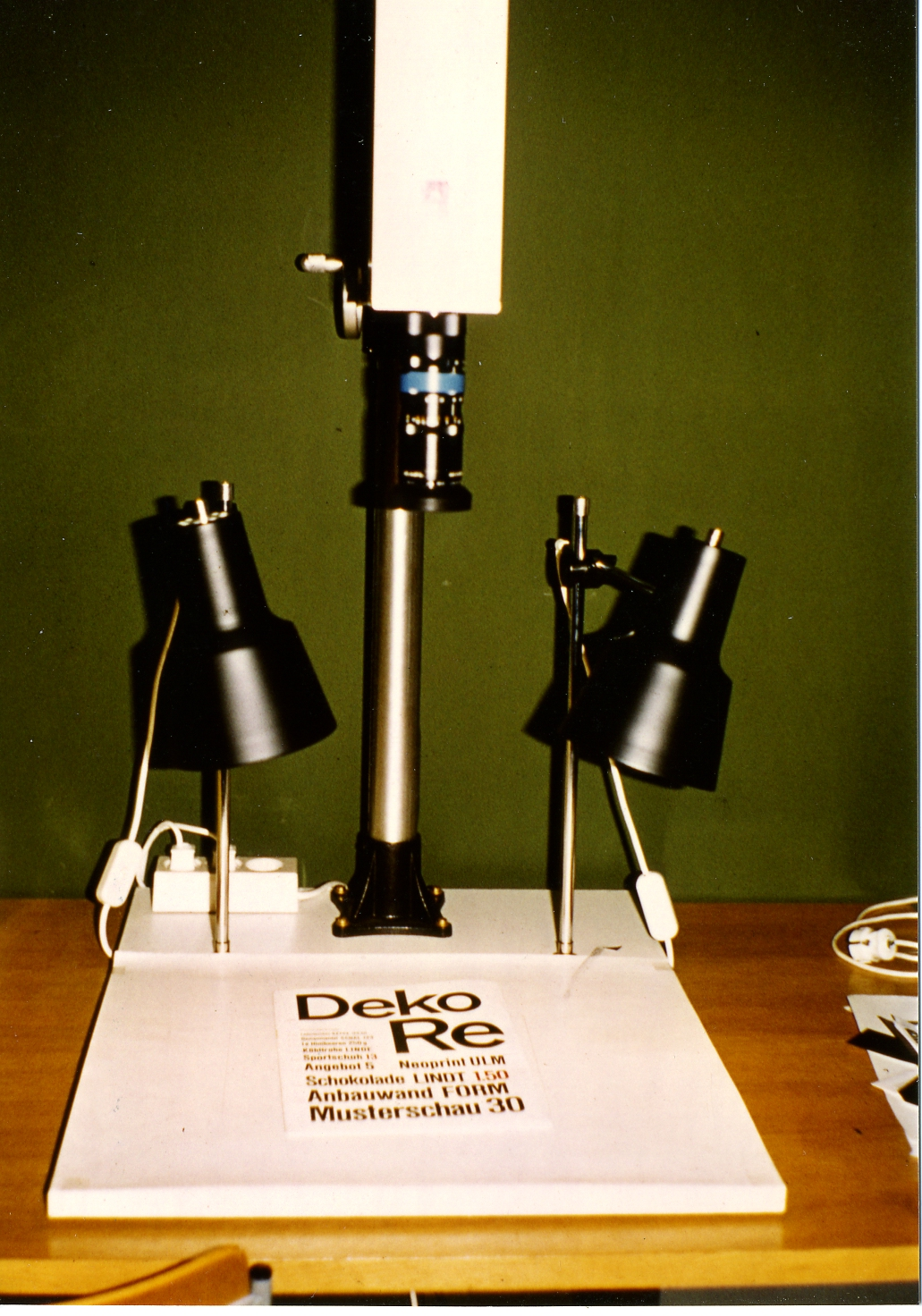
Video Lupe 1974, manufactured by Wolf Audio Visuals - document camera prototype model

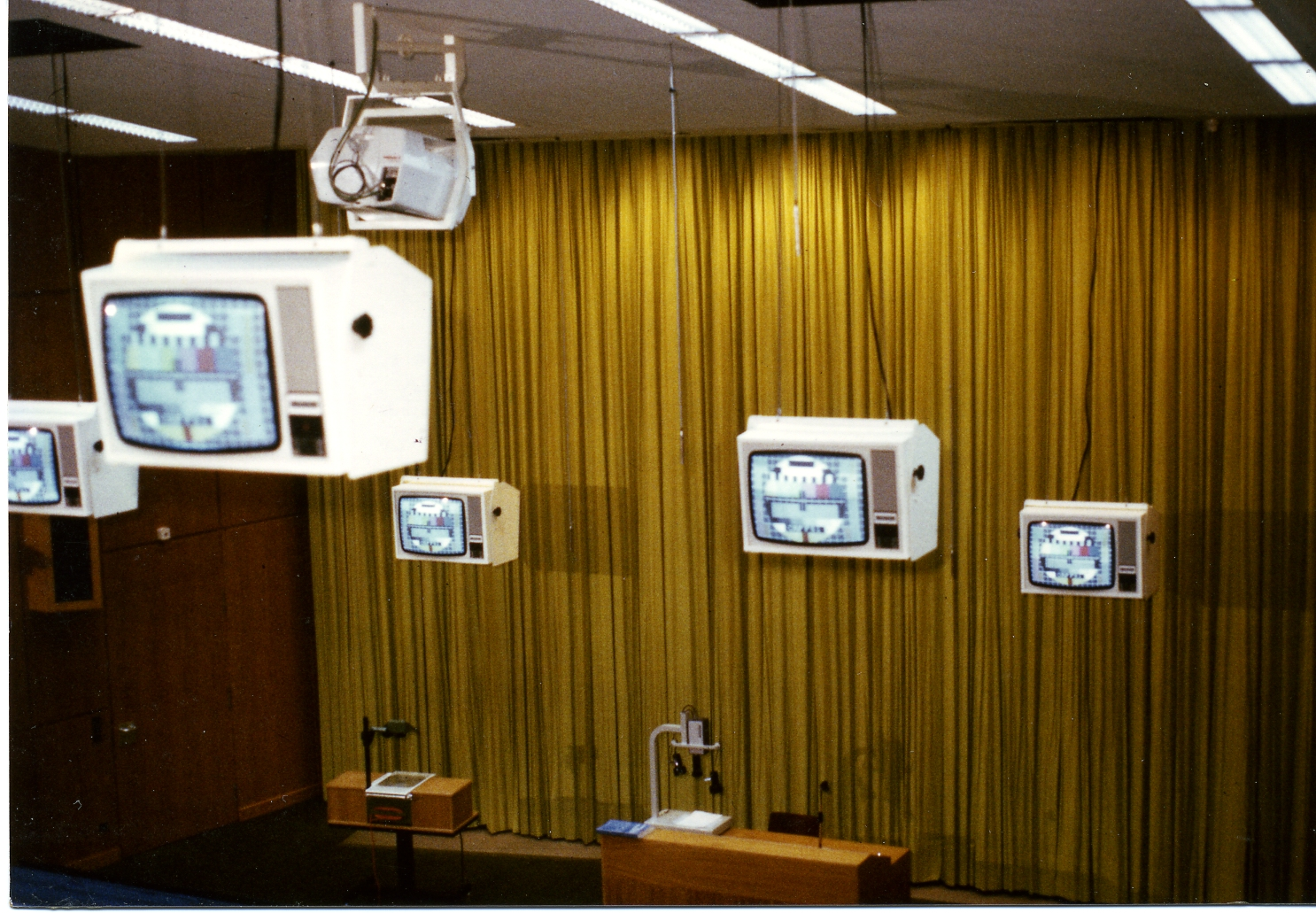
A Video Lupe AV installation (1975) prototype document camera

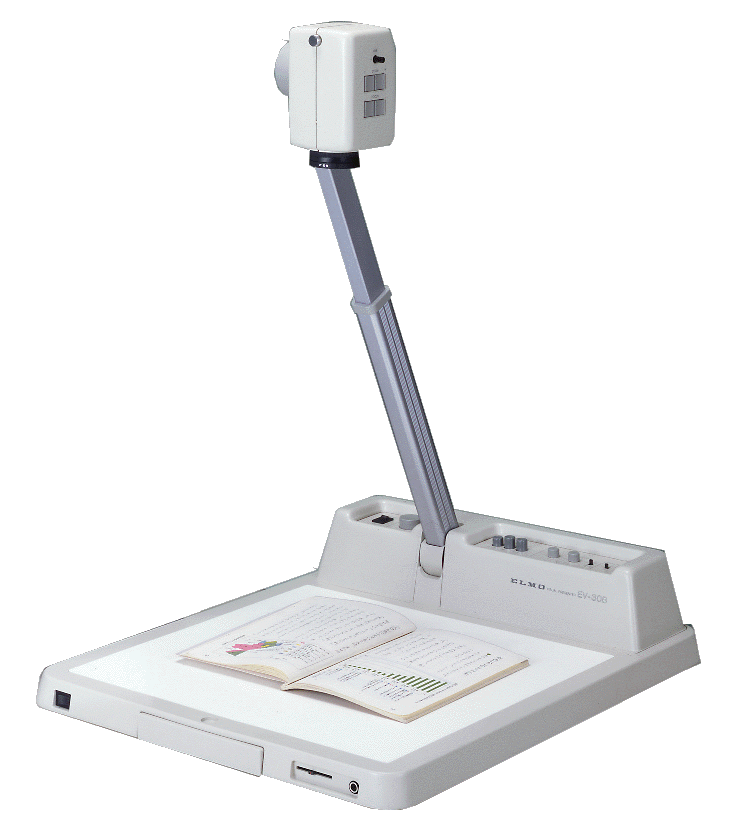
Elmo releases its first Visualizer EV-308

Early prototypes of document cameras consisted of simple video cameras mounted on copy stands. They began to be assembled and equipped with additional lighting for consistent image quality beginning in at least the 1970s, allowing effective use in dimly lit environments.

Document cameras were developed to address the need for direct projection of original documents, plans, drawings, and objects without prior preparation. The first document camera, known as a visualizer, was reportedly developed by WolfVision and Elmo and introduced at the Photokina trade fair in 1988. Progressive scan cameras were introduced toward the end of the 1990s. Most modern visualizers are capable of outputting at least 30 frames per second.

== Technology ==
The design of a document camera incorporates several different technologies. Image quality depends on primary components: the optics, camera, lighting, and the motherboard and associated firmware. Manufacturers produce various designs for the finished product. Some document cameras offer HDMI output, audio/video recording, and Wi-Fi connectivity.

=== Optics ===
Optics vary based on the device's cost and complexity. The iris, or aperture, controls the amount of light that passes through the camera lens onto the image sensor. The lens focuses on a point of the object, projecting it onto the sensor. The area in front of and behind the point of focus is called the depth of field and affects how much of the image appears in focus. Depth of field depends on the aperture size; a smaller aperture typically results in a greater depth of field.

=== Camera ===
Progressive scan cameras use either CCD or CMOS sensors. Progressive scanning generally offers higher resolution compared to the interlaced method. A progressive scan camera captures scan lines sequentially, whereas an interlaced camera uses alternating sets of lines.

Image sensors typically provide monochrome images. With a 1-chip camera, color information is obtained through the use of color filters over each pixel. The Bayer filter is commonly used, arranging red, green, and blue filters in a pattern where green pixels are twice as numerous as blue or red pixels. Different algorithms are then used to interpolate the missing color information and produce a color image.

A 3CCD camera module is another method for producing color images. A prism splits white light into its red, green, and blue components, and a separate sensor is used for each color. This technology can achieve color accuracy at higher resolutions, but is more costly due to the use of three CCD sensors.

Modern camera systems used in document cameras can provide high-resolution color images at 30 frames per second. In a 3-chip camera, the measured resolution can be up to 1,500 lines. The image can be adapted to fit common display aspect ratios of 4:3, 16:9, and 16:10.

=== Lighting system ===
Uniform lighting is important for accurate color rendition in document cameras.

- Sufficient lighting can allow the document camera to produce clear images regardless of ambient light conditions.
- Lighting systems can enable the use of smaller apertures, which may increase the depth of field.
- An increase in the quality of the light source can allow more light to reach the camera sensor, potentially resulting in less noticeable noise and reducing image degradation.

Some document camera models integrate additional functionality into the light system, such as a synchronized light field or laser markers that indicate the size and position of the imaging area, adjusting simultaneously as the lens zoom.

=== Motherboard and firmware ===
The motherboard plays a role in image processing and influences the quality of the final image. Higher resolutions and higher refresh rates generate larger amounts of data that must be processed in real time, therefore requiring faster processing.

Document cameras may be equipped with automated systems designed to enhance ease of use and improve functionality and image quality. For instance, permanent auto-focus detection automatically adjusts focus settings whenever a new object is displayed, reducing the need for manual adjustments. Other examples of automated features include automatic iris adjustment, auto exposure, white balance, and automatic gain control.

Motherboards often include a variety of connections to ensure flexibility of use. In addition to HDMI, DVI, and VGA ports for connecting to displays (projectors, monitors, and video conferencing systems), several interfaces are provided to facilitate connection to a computer or interactive whiteboard. These interfaces are most commonly USB, network (LAN), and serial. An external PC or laptop may also be connected to the document camera to allow switching between a PowerPoint presentation and a live demonstration. Some models can also handle external storage devices, playing files directly from a USB flash drive or saving images taken during the presentation onto it.

Some document camera manufacturers also provide regular firmware upgrades.

== Document camera types ==
Document cameras are generally divided into three groups based on form factor:

- Wireless: Connected to a laptop, iPad, or desktop is required.
- Portable: Smaller and lightweight, and foldable models.
- Desktop: Larger, sturdier, and more stable units.
- Visualizers: Ceiling-mounted above a tabletop or podium.

=== Portable and desktop models ===
Portable and desktop models provide a working environment similar to an overhead projector. They offer flexibility regarding the variety of objects that can be displayed to an audience. Portable devices can be used in multiple locations without requiring prior installation.

=== Ceiling models ===
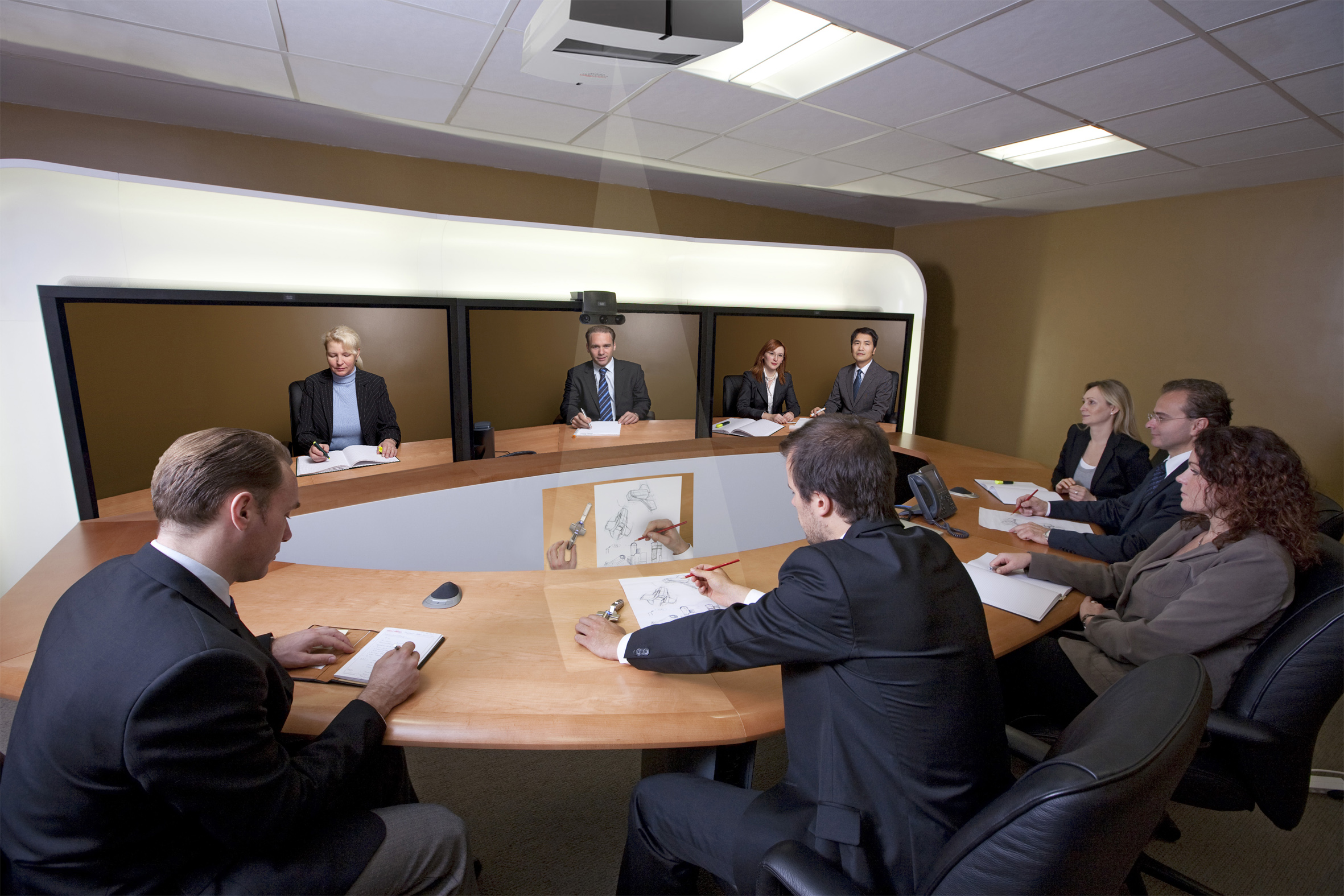
Ceiling visualizer in use in a typical telepresence installation

Ceiling-mounted visualizers are a variation of traditional desktop models and allow for larger objects to be displayed. Since the equipment is installed in the ceiling, there is no desktop equipment to obstruct the views of the speaker or audience. Ceiling models are often used to support videoconferencing or telepresence systems.

=== Document camera scanners ===
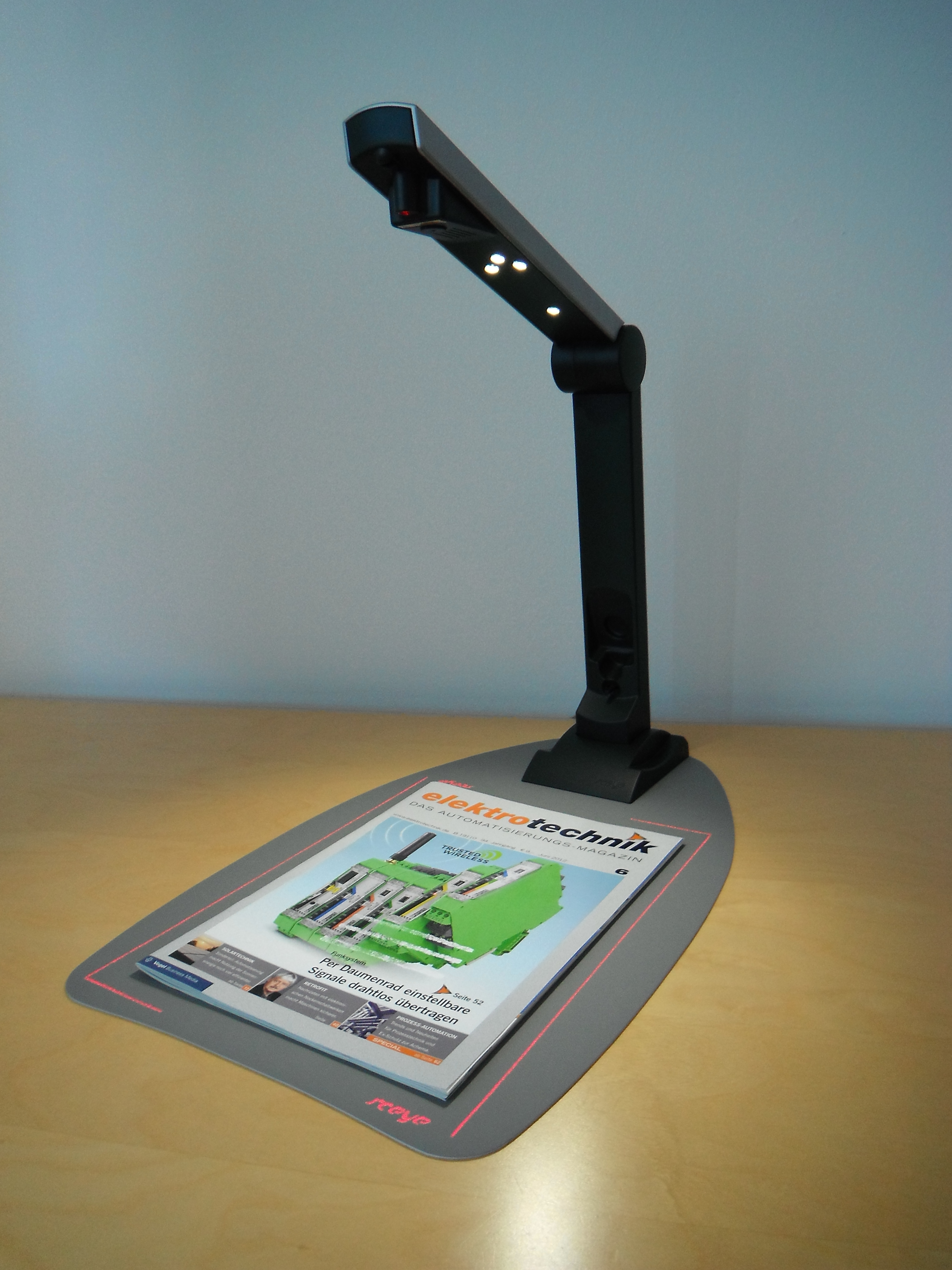
Document camera

Document cameras have been used as replacements for image scanners. Capturing images with document cameras differs from using flatbed and automatic document feeder (ADF) scanners as there are no moving parts required for the scan. In conventional scanners, either the illumination/reflector rod inside the scanner must move over the document (flatbed) or the document must pass over the rod (feeder scanners) to produce a scan of a whole image. Document cameras capture the entire document or object in one step, often instantly. Typically, documents are placed on a flat surface underneath the camera's capture area. This method of capturing the whole surface at once can reduce the time required for the scanning workflow. After capture, images are usually processed through software that may enhance the image and perform tasks such as automatic rotation, cropping, and straightening.

Documents or objects being scanned are not required to make contact with the document camera, increasing flexibility in the types of documents that can be scanned. Objects that have previously been difficult to scan on conventional scanners can potentially be scanned with a document camera. This includes documents such as stapled documents, documents in folders, or bent or crumpled items, which may jam in a feed scanner.

Reduced reaction time during scanning can also offer benefits in context-scanning applications. While ADF scanners are generally more efficient for large batches of standard documents, document cameras can be integrated directly into a workflow or process, for example, at a bank teller station. The document is scanned directly in the context of the customer interaction where it is to be placed or used. Reaction time can be an advantage in these situations. Document cameras usually require a small amount of space and are often portable.

However, when scanning large batches of unstapled documents, ADF scanners may be more efficient compared to document cameras. Document cameras may face challenges with certain environmental conditions, such as poor lighting, which can decrease the quality of scanned documents.

== See also ==
- Planetary scanner
- Overhead projector
