= Flexible seating classrooms =

A flexible seating classroom is one in which traditional seating charts are replaced with seating arrangements that allow the students to sit where they choose. One of its principal objectives is to reduce the number/duration of sedentary periods of time, which research has identified as a danger to health. A number of articles have recently reported that students' learning is benefited by physical movement rather than traditional seating. The Albemarle County Public School system in Virginia and many others have adopted this approach with reported success. Also, taken into consideration in Europe: more in detail, a Flexible seating classrooms could improve an inclusive education.

== Health impacts ==
Studies have found that extended sitting affects the development of the musculoskeletal system, leading to health disorders such as cardiovascular problems, poor posture, back pain and neck pain.

Researchers report that students perform better, are more attentive, focused, and are less disruptive in the classroom when they are allowed to move naturally. One reason is that flexible seating offers more choices and differentiation for students learning. This can increase motivation and achievement levels in the classroom. Others even have discovered Flexible seating can benefit students' physical and mental health. Students took around 2000 extra steps a day compared to in traditional desk. As well as exhibited less atypicality, social stress, anxiety, and depression. They appeared to have a better locus of control and a lower sense of inadequacy.

According to Dieter Breithecker at Germany's Federal Institute for Posture and Mobilization Support, brain activity slows down when the body becomes stationary, for example when sitting in a traditional classroom. Breithecker recommended flexible seating arrangements to remedy these dangers.

Flexible seating classroom designs include:

- stools
- couches
- beanbag chairs
- chairs
- beds
- mats
- inflatable balls
- standing
- laying on the floor
- pillows
- benches
- hanging chairs
