= Rollei =

German optical equipment manufacturer

- Founded: 1 February 1920 as Werkstatt für Feinmechanik und Optik, Franke & Heidecke; Rollei GmbH & Co. KG owns the rights to the "Rollei" brand since 1 January 2015
- Founder: Paul Franke and Reinhold Heidecke
- Headquarters: Hamburg, Germany formerly Braunschweig
- Products: cameras and other optical equipment
- Website: www.rollei.com

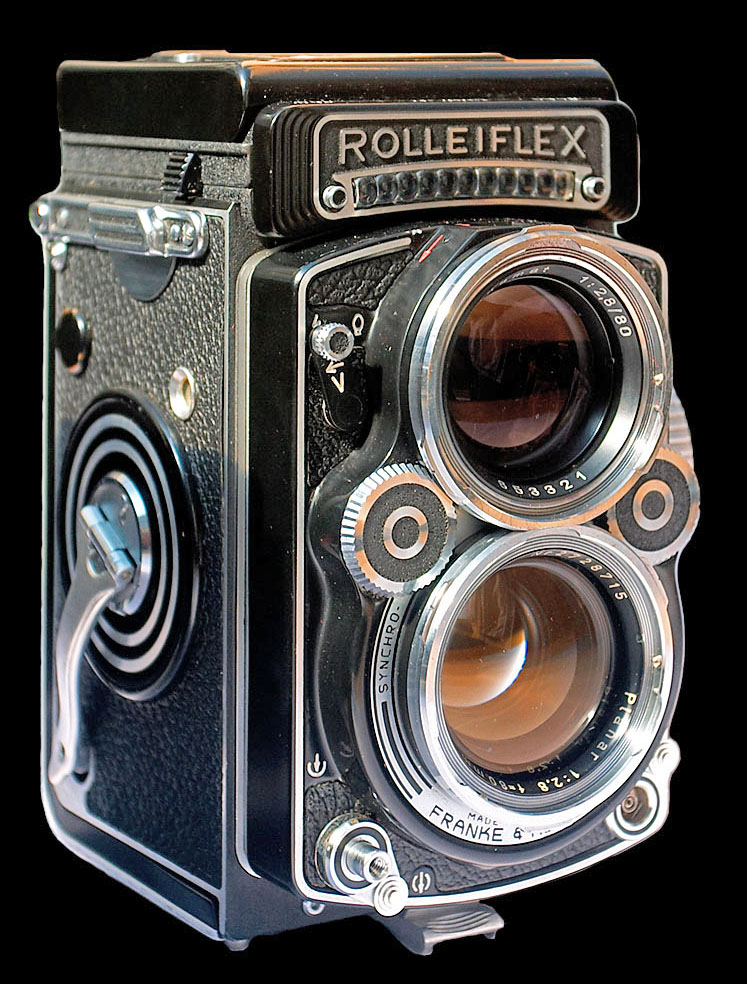
Rolleiflex medium format camera.

Rollei (German pronunciation: [ˈʁɔlaɪ]) is a German manufacturer of optical instruments founded in 1920 by Paul Franke and Reinhold Heidecke in Braunschweig, (Note: The German city of Braunschweig is known as Brunswick in English, but the German spelling will be used in this article.) Lower Saxony, and maker of the Rolleiflex and Rolleicord series of cameras. Later products included speciality and nostalgic type films for the photo hobbyist market.

Originally named Werkstatt für Feinmechanik und Optik, Franke & Heidecke, the company renamed into Rollei-Werke Franke & Heidecke GmbH in 1962, Rollei-Werke Franke & Heidecke GmbH & Co. KG, in 1979, and Rollei Fototechnic GmbH & Co. KG in 1981.

After being purchased in 1995 by Samsung Techwin, part of the South Korean Samsung Group, it was sold back to its internal management in 1999. In 2002, it was bought by a Danish investment group, and renamed Rollei GmbH in 2004.

In 2005/2006, the company headquarters moved to Berlin and the company was split into two different companies: Rollei GmbH in Berlin, owner of the Rollei brand and selling various OEM equipment, and Rollei Produktion GmbH in Braunschweig, an equipment factory which became Franke & Heidecke GmbH, Feinmechanik und Optik.

Following another restructuring in 2007, Rollei was split into three companies. Franke & Heidecke GmbH, Feinmechanik und Optik focused on the production of professional medium format cameras and slide projectors, while RCP-Technik GmbH & Co. KG in Hamburg was responsible for Rollei consumer products like re-branded compact digital cameras in the European market, and with the RCP Technik Verwaltungs GmbH owning the rights to the "Rollei" and "Rolleiflex" brands. Finally, Rollei Metric GmbH took over the photogrammetry business.

In early 2009, Franke & Heidecke GmbH, Feinmechanik und Optik declared itself insolvent. Since 2009 Rolleiflex medium format cameras, Rollei 35 and Rolleivision slide projectors were being produced by the DHW Fototechnik GmbH—a company founded by Rolf Daus, Hans Hartje and Frank Will, former Franke & Heidecke employees. DHW Fototechnik presented two new Rolleiflex cameras and a new electronic shutter at photokina 2012. DHW itself filed for insolvency on 15 August 2014 and was dissolved in April 2015, thereby temporarily ending any further production of cameras, lenses and accessories. A new, smaller company called DW Photo was formed with reduced staffing, and more or less the same people leading the business; the manufacturing and sale of projectors and twin-lens reflex cameras, as well as that of the series 6000, was stopped, to concentrate on the Hy6 and accessories. A new battery and charger for owners of the 6000 series were however released to the market in 2019, as the original NiCd batteries could age prematurely.

As of 2015 the brands "Rollei" and "Rolleiflex" continue to be owned by the RCP Technik Verwaltungs GmbH. On 1 January 2015, the RCP-Technik GmbH & Co. KG refirmed as Rollei GmbH & Co. KG to market digital consumer cameras and accessories under the "Rollei" label in Europe.

== Overview ==
Rollei was a German company that established a worldwide reputation with the Rolleiflex, a twin-lens reflex camera.

Rollei was founded in 1920 as the Werkstatt für Feinmechanik und Optik, Franke & Heidecke in order to make a twin-lens reflex camera. The company changed its name and legal form many times: to Rollei-Werke Franke & Heidecke in 1962, to Rollei-Werke Franke & Heidecke GmbH & Co. KG in 1979, to Rollei Fototechnic GmbH & Co. KG in 1981, and finally to Rollei GmbH in 2004. In 2006, the headquarters of Rollei GmbH were moved to Berlin while production was transferred to Rollei Produktion GmbH, currently Franke & Heidecke GmbH, in Braunschweig. The company underwent more radical restructuring in 2007/2008.

The frequent name-changes are an indication of a turbulent history: After the popularity of the twin lens reflex cameras declined, the Rolleiflex was supplemented with a variety of models. The company expanded its production facilities and product range at the end of the 1960s beyond what a small company like Rollei could manage. Rollei's decision to start manufacturing in Singapore in 1970 was regarded as a pioneering achievement by the photographic industry. Unfortunately, it also damaged the company's reputation as a German precision manufacturer. In 1982, after many failed attempts at restructuring, the company finally achieved success by focusing on medium format cameras along with a few other products. Surveying systems were added to the product range in 1986, and modern digital and compact cameras were included from 1991.

Over the years, many great photographers have used Rollei cameras: David Bailey and Diane Arbus (Rolleiflex 3.5F TLR with 75 mm f/3.5 Planar), Brett Weston (Rolleiflex SL66 and SL66E SLR), and Helmut Newton (Rolleiflex 2.8GX), amongst others.

Rollei cameras typically used Carl Zeiss or Schneider Kreuznach lenses, as well as lenses manufactured by Rollei based on designs by Zeiss, and occasionally lenses made by Japanese manufacturers.

== Historical development ==
=== 1920 to 1928 ===
==== Company foundation ====
While Reinhold Heidecke was working as a production manager at Voigtländer in Braunschweig around 1916, he got the idea to manufacture a new type of roll-film camera. However, the company rejected his proposal because they thought there would be problems keeping the film perfectly flat. Besides, their current camera range, which used conventional photographic plates, was selling well. Heidecke tried unsuccessfully to secure financing to start his own company, so, at the insistence of his wife, he presented his concept to Paul Franke, a salesman and former colleague at Voigtländer. Franke was so enthusiastic he put up 75,000 M of his own money and went looking for more capital. After he secured additional funding of 200,000 M, they resolved to go into business together. In November 1919, they filed an application to register the company "Franke & Heidecke", which was entered into the German Trade Register on 1 February 1920.

In need of factory space, they rented several rooms in a house at Viewegstraße 32, which became the company's first headquarters. The house survived World War II intact and stands to this day. Other rooms in the house were used by a dancing school, who had to abandon their dancing lessons because of noise from the factory. Within a year, Franke and Heidecke had taken over the entire building. By 1922, business was so good that they were able to take out a loan to purchase the property outright.

==== Stereo Heidoscop ====
To get the company going, Franke and Heidecke decided to manufacture a stereo camera in the short term. Cameras of this type were popular, and Reinhold Heidecke was very familiar with them. As they were also in Voigtländer's product range, however, Franke and Heidecke did not want to look as if they were simply copying theirs. They purchased several Voigtländer units, and from what they learned by dismantling these, constructed the Stereo Heidoscop. It included two Carl Zeiss Tessar lenses (f/4.5, 55 mm) and, mounted between them, a Carl Zeiss Super Triplet (f/3.2) viewfinder. At that time, Tessar lenses were widely regarded as the best available; they were often used in the United States, even though locally produced alternatives were available. Zeiss had an excellent reputation world-wide, which Franke & Heidecke leveraged for their own products. More importantly, they differentiated themselves from cheaper alternatives. The camera projected an image onto glass plates of dimensions 45 mm × 107 mm. The name Heidoscop was chosen in part to remind the management at Voigtländer that they had restricted Heidecke in his work there.

The Heidoscop was a great success, exceeding all expectations. In 1923, the company introduced a Heidoscop for 117 format (B1) roll-film. It was from this product, the "'Roll-film Heidoscop"', that the name Rollei was derived, which later became the name of company.

==== Hyperinflation in Germany ====
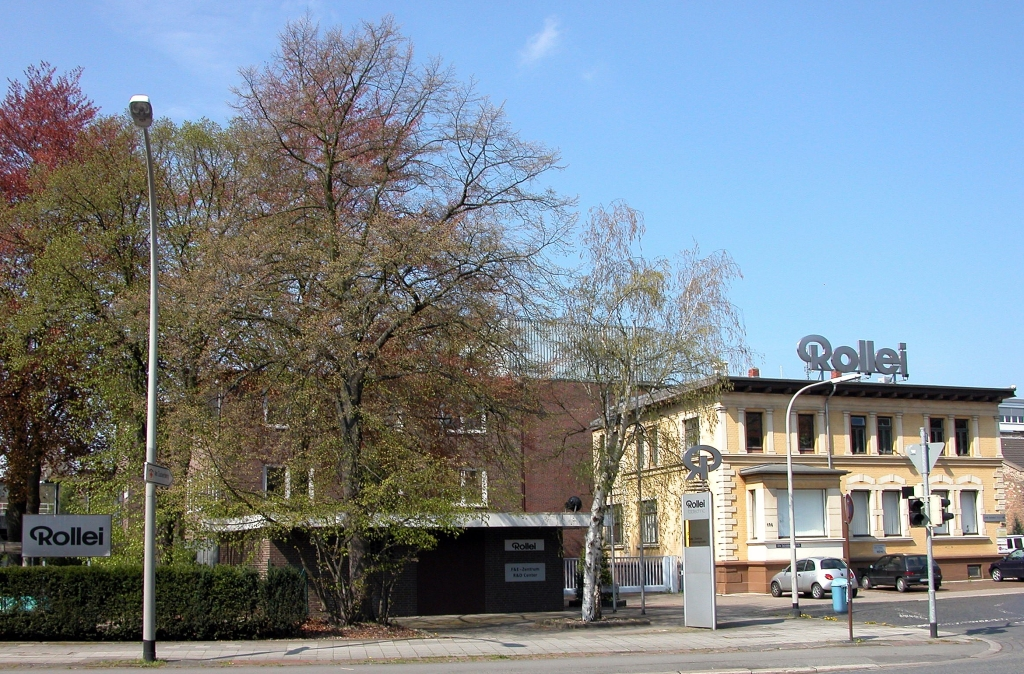
Rollei in Braunschweig (Salzdahlumer Straße)

Between 1914 and 1923, the period of hyperinflation in Germany, Paul Franke lived up to his reputation as a savvy financier: he invested the income from exports (in foreign currency) so astutely that the company came through this difficult period unscathed – a rather unlikely outcome if Heidecke, alone, had made these decisions.

During this period the company acquired new premises. The City Council in Braunschweig did not really want a noisy factory operating within a residential area and pressured the company to move its factory elsewhere. Accordingly, on 10 January 1923 the company purchased a 60,000 m^{2} (15 acres) plot of land on Salzdahlumer Straße, which at that time lay just beyond the city limits. Hyperinflation had devalued the currency so much that the land purchase cost practically nothing. Once the new factory had been built, much was expected of the new camera. However, Paul Franke proposed a temporary suspension of further development work because of the catastrophic economic situation. Heidecke concurred, believing that better times lay ahead.

==== Rolleiflex ====
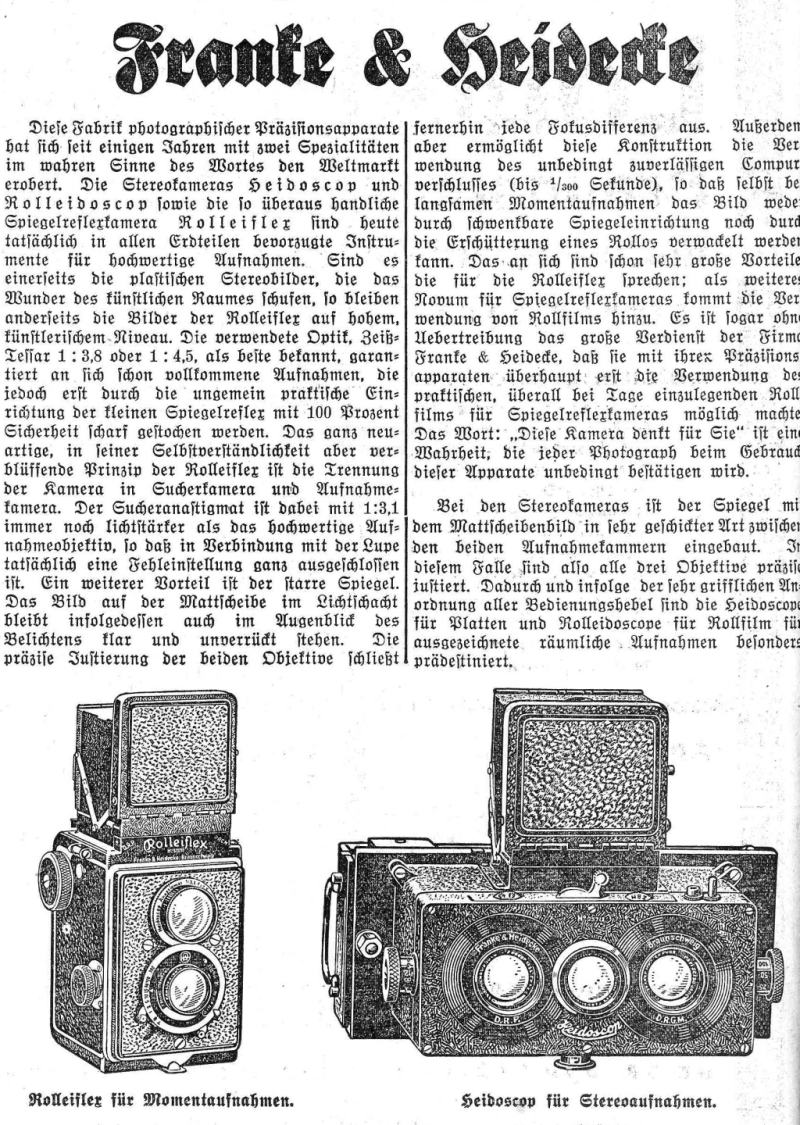
Advertisement from 1920s

The first prototype of the new camera, named the Rolleiflex, was finally completed in 1927; it was built for absolute reliability and featured a rigid, injection-moulded housing made of aluminium. Heidecke wanted to avoid conventional leather bellows for focusing the lens because of an earlier, bad experience: around 1916, he conducted an experiment with a Kodak camera; he left it in a cellar, and when he later retrieved it, he found that rats had eaten the bellows. This convinced him that a camera designed for photojournalism and operation in the tropics had to work perfectly, which excluded components that might rot. He ruled out a cloth shutter curtain for the same reason, choosing instead a Compur mechanical shutter.

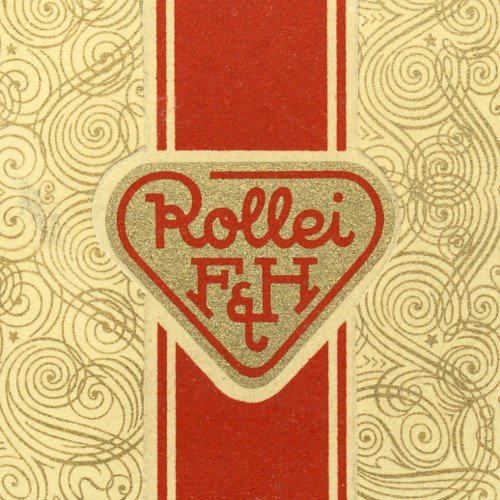

Focusing in the "Rolleiflex" was achieved by moving the carriage that held both the viewfinder and the imaging lens, i.e. the camera had so-called "metallic bellows"; that is, the plate enclosed the sides of the case. It was crucial that the plate remained parallel as it moved during focusing; to achieve this, Heidecke developed an ingenious design which proved to be highly successful. Behind the imaging lens and surrounding the opening for the optical path was a large cogwheel which drove four smaller cogs located top left and right, and bottom left and right. Each of the four small cogs drove rack and pinions (toothed rails) attached to the lens assembly. This system functioned perfectly, and, thanks to high-quality components, also for many years of service. Only the viewfinder and back of the camera, both made of aluminium, had to be handled with care, which remained the case until the camera went into production.

One more prototype was produced in 1928, and then the big moment finally arrived: on 10 August, the first camera went into series production. Altogether, 14 units were made that year. Then, at 11am on Monday, 11 December, selected journalists were invited to a press conference in the festively decorated production area. Paul Franke put together press packs for the occasion, which led one magazine to publish a test report without ever actually handling the camera. Although Franke had forgotten to prepare sample photographs to distribute to the press, he neatly avoided this oversight by distributing empty, labelled cartons around the building, just for show.

=== 1929 to 1950 ===
==== New premises ====
Demand for the new camera exceeded production capacity by a wide margin. Even though it was quite an expensive product, orders for 800 cameras were received in the first month alone. A Rolleiflex fitted with a f/4.5 lens cost 198 ℛ︁ℳ︁, with a f/3.8 lens it cost 225 ℛ︁ℳ︁. This success made it possible to obtain credit to buy a new factory and thrive in the midst of the Great Depression. In the old factory, a further 23,720 cameras were produced up until 1932. In 1930, the company moved into the new factory on Salzdahlumer Straße. It comprised two floors with a total area of 2,000 square metres (1/2 acre), sufficient space to manufacture 20,000 cameras annually. Although the site was well served by public transport, it lay some distance from the city centre, so the company built a canteen and shop for its workforce, which now numbered 309 employees.

==== Babyflex ====
Wilhelmine Heidecke, Reinhold Heidecke's wife, suggested building a "ladies camera" – a Rolleiflex that used 35 mm film. This was the first Rolleiflex to come on the market that used a crank handle to advance the film, a popular feature that emerged on the 6×6 model shortly thereafter. The Rolleiflex 4×4 – known as the Babyflex outside of Germany – used 127 format film and came in two versions with either a f/3.5 and a f/2.8 Tessar lens with a focal length of 60 mm. Unfortunately, sales were disappointing, so production never resumed after the war. The company management believed that many Rollei photographers only made contact prints from their negatives because they had no access to enlargers. However, this was not practical in the case of the Babyflex as the negatives were simply too small. As a result, it was not until 1957 that a new version came onto the market priced at 355 DM, firstly in grey, and later (from 1963) in black. By the time production ceased in 1968, over 67,000 units had been made. By this time few amateur photographers made contact prints any more, preferring instead to take 35 mm transparencies (slides), which could be viewed on a slide projector.

==== Studio camera ====
In 1932, Salomon Kahn, the owner of the renowned Fotostudios Kardas in Berlin, approached Rollei, asking if they could build him a large Rolleiflex for the 9 cm × 9 cm film format. Kahn explained as a pretext, that his customers liked to keep the negatives because they had doubts about the durability of prints. Moreover, roll film was much easier to archive than glass plates.

In fact, Kahn had concealed the real rationale behind his request because Franke & Heidecke supported the Nazi Party in order to get the workers they needed. Fearing the consequences of leasing to a Jew, the owner of his studio had already shut off his water supply. This meant that Kahn had to develop his negatives at home, whereby roll film was easier to transport than plates. A roll film camera would also facilitate house calls.

Having built a small Rolleiflex, the obvious next step was to make a larger version. Indeed, the slogan "you see what you get" had already been envisaged for it. Such a camera would make studio work more straightforward; at that time, the photographer had to stoop under a black cloth to adjust the camera, and then address the subject from this awkward position. Nevertheless, after the failure of the Babyflex, the company proceeded with caution by initially building some prototypes. One was delivered to Kahn, and the others were shipped abroad in pairs – one to be retained by the importer as a demonstration unit, the other to be delivered to a reputable studio. The project was eventually abandoned after Salomon Kahn was arrested and nobody else showed any interest in the studio camera. Of the 14 prototypes that were built, one still exists: it currently belongs to the Municipal Museum of Braunschweig.

==== Rolleicord ====
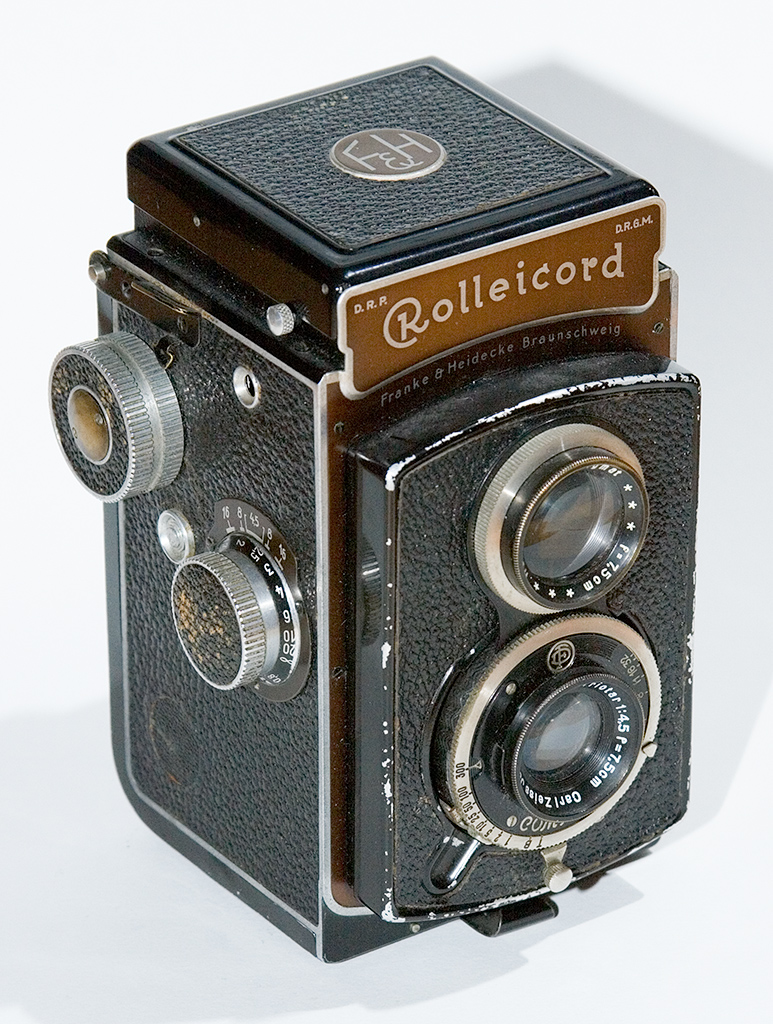
Rolleicord

In 1933, the Rolleicord, a cheaper version of the Rolleiflex, came onto the market. It had simpler Zeiss Triotar Lens, a steel back-plate, and a knob instead of a handle for winding on the film. The Rolleicord 1 cost 105 ℛ︁ℳ︁; altogether 2,699,505 Rolleicords were manufactured until production ceased in 1976. The later models (III - VB) uses Schneider Xenar lenses that have better optics.

==== Rolleiflex Automat ====
The release of the Rolleiflex Automat in the middle of June 1937 marked another significant milestone for Franke & Heidecke. Prior to this, after taking a picture, two separate steps were required to advance the film and cock the shutter. The Rolleiflex Automat combined the two, whereby advancing the film automatically cocked the shutter. Not only did this innovation speed up the whole process, it also eliminated accidental double exposures resulting from inadvertently forgetting to wind on the film. It also had a film-feeler mechanism that automatically started the counter, so no red window was needed.

The Rolleiflex Automat won the Grand Prix award at the Paris World's Fair in 1937, which generated a lot of interest. The company founders we so taken with their new creation that they immediately commissioned the construction of a second factory. The new factory, comprising three floors with a combined production area of 3,000 square metres (3/4 acre), provided sufficient space to house a further 700 workers. It was completed in 1938, and by the end of that year the 300,000th camera had come off the production line. In retrospect, Reinhold Heidecke regarded the Rolleiflex Automat as his favourite camera.

==== World War II ====
During World War II, the company was required by the Nazis to support the war economy. As a result, Rollei was unable to develop any new models from 1940, and production of its stereo camera finally came to an end. Rollei also suffered massive losses resulting from its inability to collect monies owed by debtors from "enemy states". Furthermore, bureaucratic formalities and controls hindered exports to neutral countries. This situation, combined with the collapse in overseas trade, forced Paul Franke to reduce the workforce to 600 people.

===== Armaments production =====
Alongside its renowned cameras, Rollei – like its neighbour Voigtländer – was now engaged in the manufacture of equipment deemed important to the German war effort: precision optics for binoculars, periscopes, telescopic sights (for sniper rifles, for example), and theodolites for directing artillery. Although these products consumed the bulk of the companies resources, some regular product development was still possible, and work on tempered glass lenses as well as flash synchronization continued, albeit on a small scale. The cameras were used inter alia in military reconnaissance.

As Braunschweig was one of the centres of the German armaments industry, it was subjected to frequent, sometimes heavy aerial bombardment, which seriously damaged the city. On 1 and 15 January 1944, and again on 13 August, Rollei too suffered air raid damage to its factories. By the time the war ended on 12 April 1945, almost 65% of its plant and machinery had been destroyed.

==== The post-war period ====
After the war, Braunschweig ended up in the British occupation zone. The allied occupying forces wanted Rollei to survive as a company, even helping it procure lenses from Zeiss, which had ended up in the Soviet occupation zone. Franke & Heidecke started over with 72 workers, and by Christmas 1945 the workforce had grown to 172 employees. Everything the company made in 1945 was delivered to the British Ministry of Defence. The difficult supply situation forced Rollei into using lenses from the West German manufacturer Schneider as well. However, this was not a problem as Schneider's quality control was equal to that of Zeiss.

Paul Franke's untimely death in the spring of 1950 had serious consequences for the company though. Not only did his passing mark the end of an era for Rollei, the loss of his business acumen also led the company to the edge of ruin on more than one occasion.

=== 1950 to 1963 – Horst Franke era ===
==== The golden era ====
After Paul Franke's death, his son Horst Franke succeeded him. Overall, he proved to be less effective as a manager than his father. In particular, he lacked the flexibility required to adapt to changing circumstances; for example, he failed to reduce the workforce in difficult times, whereas Paul Franke had done so immediately at the onset of the war.

To begin with, Rollei had no real competition, which yielded ever increasing sales of its cameras. In the 1950s, almost every press photographer owned a Rolleiflex, and quite a few amateurs did as well. The camera was so popular that it bred over 500 imitations, more than half of them from Japan. The factory grew rapidly; by 1956 – the year the millionth camera was sold – the workforce numbered 1600, and by 1957 the workforce had grown to 2000 employees.

==== Development of the Rolleiflex ====
Hans Hass, the underwater diving pioneer, approached Franke & Heidecke to see if they could make him a special housing suitable for underwater photography. As a result, Rollei developed the Rolleimarin, an ingenious underwater camera housing rated for depths up to 100 m. It was made from two cast metal parts. The top part contained a glass prism that was attached to the camera's focusing screen. There were also knobs on top of the housing for adjusting the exposure and aperture settings. On the bottom, left-hand side of the housing was the focusing knob, and on the right-hand side, the winding handle and a frame counter. There was also a filter turret. A special flash bulb could be attached for flash photography, in which case a battery pack had to be installed inside the housing. Of course, a viewfinder frame could also be screwed onto the housing.

Although there were many imitators, none could match the quality of the original Rolleiflex – that is, until the Mamiya C-Series from Japan appeared in 1956. Mamiya initially offered three sets of interchangeable double lenses for it: normal, telephoto and wide-angle. Later on, additional double lenses with focal lengths of 55 mm and 250 mm were introduced; one even had a dimmable viewfinder lens, which enabled depth of field adjustment through the viewfinder. By comparison, the Rolleiflex only had a single, fixed normal lens, although the Rollei Magnar tele-converter lens with 4× magnification was available as an accessory. This could be attached to the front of the primary lens while a mask (which did not magnify the image) was placed over the focusing screen. In addition, Zeiss offered two double lens converters which attached to the viewfinder filter bayonet and the primary lens bayonet. The 5-element Mutar tele-converter magnified 1.5×, weighed 327 g and could render an image accurately in the viewfinder up to a distance of 4m from the object. The 4-element Mutar wide-angle converter magnified 0.7×, weighed 437 g and could render an object accurately from a distance of 1 meter. In all cases, for the best image quality, closing down the aperture two stops was recommended. This explains why conversion lenses of this type were only regarded as a makeshift solution in comparison to fully interchangeable lenses.

In response to the challenge from Mamiya, Rollei created a camera comparable to the C Series and gave it to photojournalists to test. Although they were enthusiastic, Rollei did not believe – much to the astonishment of industry experts – that it could manufacture removable lenses with the required precision. Instead, as a compromise, the company introduced in 1959 the Tele-Rolleiflex with a Zeiss Sonnar f/4, 135 mm lens. This camera was particularly well-suited to portrait photography. Meanwhile, plans for another model with a 150 mm lens were abandoned. The Wide Angle Rolleiflex (also known as the Rolleiwide) with an f/4, 55 mm lens followed in 1961. It only remained in production until 1967, which today makes it one of the rarest Rolleiflex cameras – excluding special editions. Its main advantage lay in its ability to photograph large crowds at heavily attended events.

Reinhold Heidecke kept on making new cameras right up until his death in 1960, although no one bothered to admonish him over the development costs any more. One of his projects was the Magic, which required several expensive machine tools to be built – expenditure that could not be justified relative to the small number that were produced. In contrast, Agfa preferred the opposite approach, of always developing as many models as possible from an existing camera housing.

The Magic, although intended for amateur photographers, was relatively expensive at 435 DM. It featured an automatic exposure control system driven by a coupled selenium light meter which could select shutter speeds from 1/30 sec to 1/300 sec and apertures from f/3.5 to f/22. There were only two manual controls: one for focusing, the other for selecting either a shutter speed of 1/30 sec (for flash photography), or Brief (for long-exposure night photography). Its successor, the Magic II, cost 498 DM and also featured manual exposure control.

===== TLR accessories =====
Some accessories manufactured for Rollei TLRs:

- Rolleinar: A set of close-up lenses, in three magnifications (Rolleinar 1, Rolleinar 2, and Rolleinar 3). A pair of Rolleinar lenses are placed on both the viewing and taking lenses.
- Rolleisoft: A soft focus lens for the taking lens only available in two grades, "0" and "1", which softens the definition and produce striking halo effects, particularly when used with back lighting. The Rolleisoft lens has concentric circles ground in groves and is used principally for portraiture.
- Rolleifix: Instead of screwing the camera body to a tripod, this tripod head clamps down on the TLR.
- Rolleipol: Rollei's polarizing filter.
- Rolleikin: Allows the use of 35 mm film.
- Rollei panorama head: Attaches the camera to a tripod, and enables the photographer to take a series of aligned pictures to create a panoramic photo in an arc up to 360°.
- Rollei pistol grip
- Rolleimarin: underwater housing.

==== The situation around 1960 ====
By the end of 1950s, the market for twin-lens medium format cameras had gradually become saturated. More and more amateur photographers and photojournalists were using 35 mm format cameras, while studio photographers preferred single-lens medium format cameras. Although they were more expensive, single-lens cameras offered film holders, which could quickly be swapped (an assistant loaded the film), as well as interchangeable lenses.

Hasselblad was the market leader in this segment. The Swedish company introduced their first camera, the Hasselblad 1600F, in 1948. However, this model was regarded as being technically inferior because its shutter was unreliable. To solve this problem, the 1000F was released in 1952 with a reduced shutter speed range, but the focal-plane shutter was still prone to failure. While it was no threat to the fully developed Rolleiflex to begin with, that situation changed when the legendary Hasselblad 500C featuring a Compur leaf shutter appeared in 1957. The management of Rollei under Horst Franke were caught napping, having failed to produce a camera that could match the latest Hasselblad. As a consequence, sales plummeted and the company got into financial difficulties. In the end, Horst Franke relinquished his position as general manager.

==== New products ====
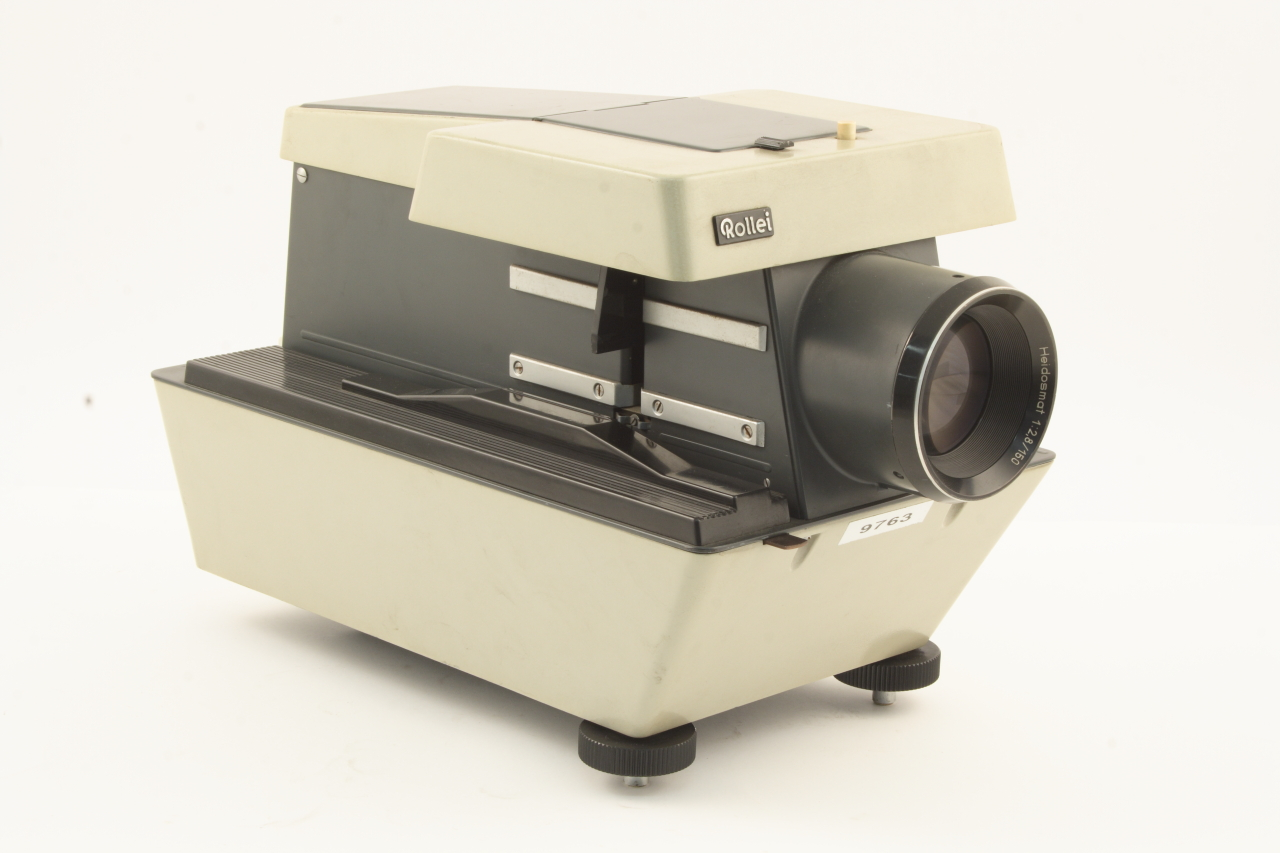
Rollei P11

In 1960, Rollei introduced its first slide projector, the P11. It included two slide trays: the left-hand tray was for 35 mm (5 cm×5 cm) slides, the right-hand tray was for medium format (7 cm×7 cm) slides. The Rollei Universal Projector sold for 398.60 DM, plus 97.50 DM for a standard lens. The P11 remained in production until 1978; many more projectors were subsequently added to the range, providing a major boost to Rollei's turnover.

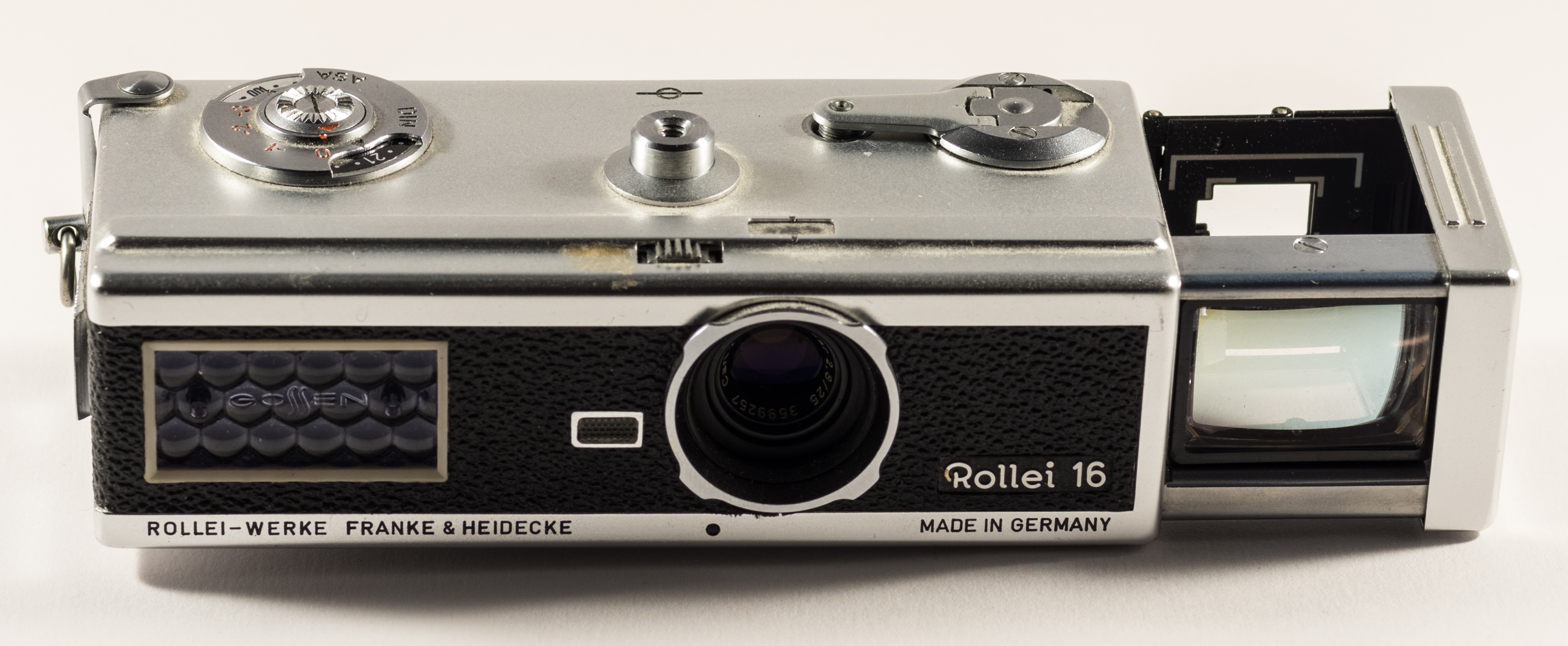
Rollei 16

In 1963, Rollei introduced the Rollei 16, its first all-new camera design since the war. It was a 16 mm camera in the format 12 mm × 17 mm with a Tessar f/2.8, 25 mm lens and cost 425 DM. In retrospect, it seems unlikely that such an unusual format might return Rollei to profitability. However, the German camera industry believed that this was the way forward, and both Leica and Wirgin (through their Edixa brand) produced similar designs.

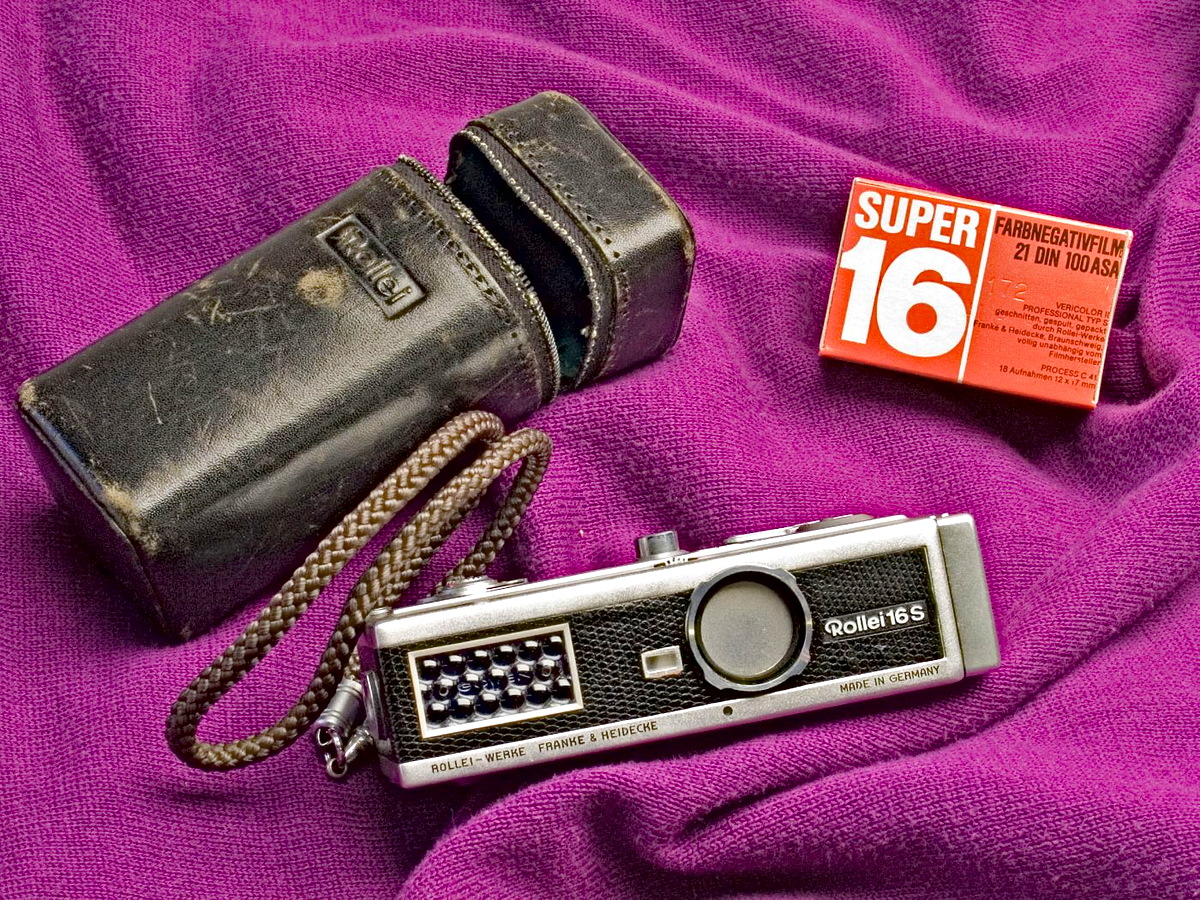
Rollei 16 S and Super 16 color negative film

The Rollei 16 used special Super 16 film cartridges with a capacity of 18 frames. As no film manufacturer was interested in making this film format, Rollei had to manufacture the film itself. A roll of B/W film cost 5 DM, while slide film (available until 1981) cost 12.50 DM, including development. Loading the film simply required inserting the leader into the appropriate slot in the camera. Since there was no take-up spool, the film coiled up loosely on itself. Without a doubt, limited film choice and availability adversely affected camera sales, consequently only 25,000 units were produced. As Rollei also spent a lot on advertising, this camera did little to alleviate its dire financial situation. Reliance on a film format that Kodak, the market leader, did not support was foolhardy. Needless to say, the quality of the engineering in the Rollei 16 matched its high price; it had a push-pull viewfinder with automatic parallax correction up to 40 cm, whereby extending the viewfinder also wound on the film and cocked the shutter. In addition, Mutar wide-angle (0.5×) and telephoto (1.7×) conversion lenses were available as accessories. An improved successor, the Rollei 16 S, was released in 1965.

=== 1964 to 1974 – Peesel era ===
==== Reorganisation of the product line ====
To help return the company to profitability, Rollei's management sought advice from a number of experts. One of them, Heinrich Peesel, a physicist from Hamburg, produced a concise, 5-page report that so impressed Rollei management that they offered him the chairmanship of the board, thereby accepting that far-reaching changes were necessary.

Peesel, then 38 years old, thus succeeded Horst Franke as chairman of the board on 1 January 1964. He promptly set Rollei onto an extremely risky course, which, despite some early successes, ultimately ended in a complete fiasco. His basic philosophy was to explore all possible avenues in photography rather than concentrate on a single product line.

His approach was diametrically opposite to the company's previous management policy, as illustrated by the following example; when the British occupation forces queried Rollei as to the secret of their success, the response was: "there was no secret – it was the result of 25 years experience and concentrating on a single camera type".

Peesel asked to see all the plans for new products so that he could evaluate them. But in reality, few were actually built:

- the Rollei 35, a miniature camera that used industry standard 35 mm film
- the SL 66, a competitor to the Hasselblad 500C
- the Rolleiscop slide projector

The Rolleiscop was a compact, upright slide projector that transported slides via a gravity-fed, conveyor belt system. The slides were stacked one behind the other into proprietary, slotless magazines. Each had a capacity of 32 slides (with glass frames), or 72 slides (with cardboard frames). Different sized slides could be mixed together as long as their frames were of uniform thickness and not warped.

Peesel also increased the advertising budget significantly and reorganised production to improve efficiency. In addition, he laid off 110 out of 120 supervisors and instigated a company-wide employee suggestion scheme. Rollei's new products found favour with its customers, which helped to boost its annual turnover by 30% in comparison to 1963 – the year that the company posted losses in the midst of the first economic downturn since the war. Turnover increased from 24 million DM in 1964 to 85 million DM in 1970. Others products that followed were less successful, yet the company kept on building new factories that were inappropriate to the size of their business.

==== Rolleiflex SL66 ====
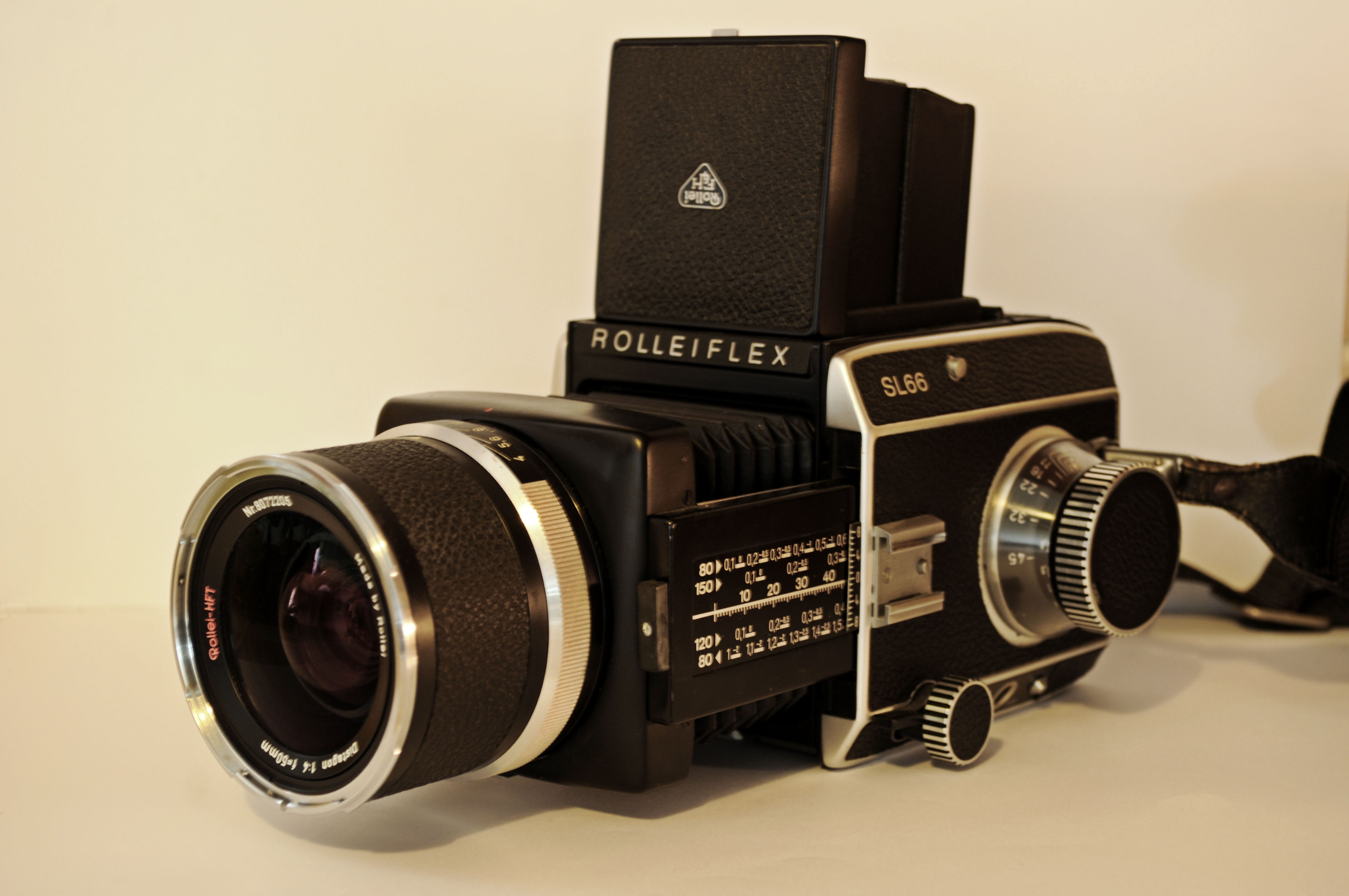
Rolleiflex SL66

Although there had been speculation in the trade press over a future Super Rolleiflex for some time, it was not until 1966 that the Rolleiflex SL66 finally appeared, SL being an abbreviation for single lens. It was a sophisticated system camera, a camera at the heart of an extensive range of interchangeable components. The SL66 had built-in bellows, as well as a pivoting front (lens) standard that could be tilted back and forth by 8°, thus allowing the region of sharpness to be manipulated according to the Scheimpflug principle. In addition, the lens could be mounted in reverse, thereby enabling macrophotography without additional equipment. With the normal lens reversed and the bellows extended by 50 mm, close-up photography with a magnification ratio of 1.5× was possible. An SL66 fitted with a normal lens (f/2.8, 80mm) cost 2,778 DM, and several interchangeable lenses were available:

- Distagon f/4, 50 mm (1,075 DM)
- Sonnar f/4, 150 mm (1,075 DM)
- Sonnar f/5.6, 250 mm (1,075 DM)
- Tele-Tessar f/5.6, 500 mm (2,263 DM)
- Mirotar f/5.6, 1000 mm (4,537 DM)
- S-Planar (Macro) f/5.6, 120 mm (1,250 DM)

At long last, Rollei had a camera that could match the Hasselbad 500C. Indeed, had it been released earlier, around 1960 say, it could have been enormously successful. On top of that, despite declining profit margins and tough competition from the Japanese, Rollei continued to target its advertising at the amateur market. In contrast, other companies such as Leitz and Hasselblad had better understood how to promote their expensive cameras in photographic magazines – not just through paid advertising, but also through feature articles in the editorial pages. As a result, the SL66 never sold in the numbers that the company had hoped for or needed. Nevertheless, Rollei owes its survival as a company to the SL66 camera system, along with its enduring reputation for quality. Its successor, the SL66E, was released in 1984; externally the camera was largely unchanged, but it now had a built-in light meter. Additional lenses were released, such as the Fisheye-Distagon (f/3.5, 30 mm), the Distagon (f/4, 40 mm), and the Sonnar (f/4, 150 mm) with a between-the-lens shutter along with more accessories including close-up lenses, extension bellows, a Polaroid film cassette, a sheet film cassette, an underwater housing, and a ring flash unit. Its successor, the SL66-X, released in 1968 only had TTL flash metering, while the SL66-SE (Special Edition) also included a standard light meter. Prior to this, TTL metering required a special prism viewfinder with a built-in light meter. The release in 1992 of the SE Exclusive Professional incorporating selective gold-plating on the housing marked the end of the SL66 series.

==== Rollei 35 ====
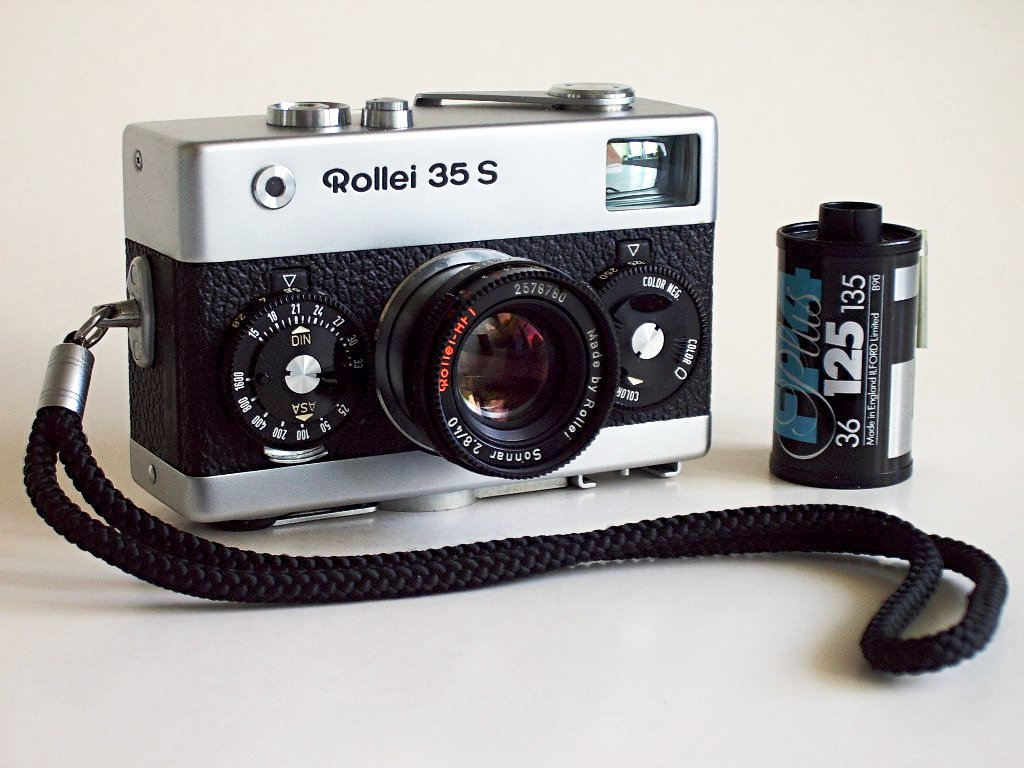
Rollei 35 S

For its time, the Rollei 35 was the smallest camera that used standard 35 mm film cartridges, which made it an ideal second camera for amateur photographers. Initially, it came with a Zeiss Tessar lens with an aperture of f/3.5 and focal length of 40 mm. In contrast to 16 mm cameras (especially pocket cameras that came along later), there was no need to work with two different film formats, which was especially convenient for showing slides. Equally important, image quality was not compromised, despite the pocket camera format. Over time, several Rollei 35 models were released; especially notable was the 35 S which had a 5-element Zeiss Sonnar f/2.8, 40 mm lens.

==== Rolleiflex SL26 ====
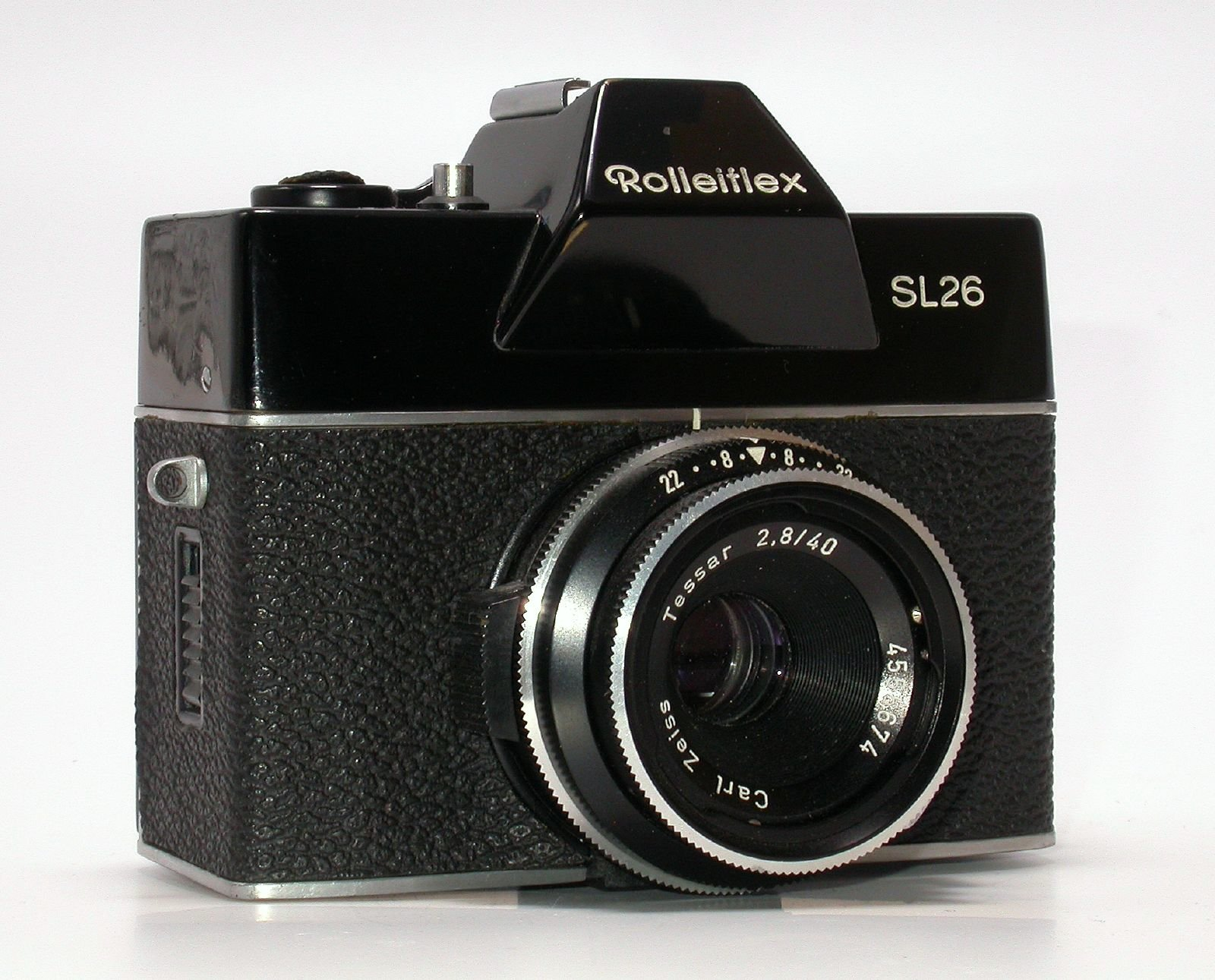
Rolleiflex SL26

Rollei also produced the Rolleiflex SL26, an Instamatic camera with interchangeable lenses. It was widely regarded as the best camera that used 126 film cartridges, even though this film format was only ever intended for beginners. Although Kodak, too, made an Instamatic SLR camera, their primary objective was to draw attention to their brand of film rather than make money from the camera. Despite the high cost of tooling up to manufacture the SL26, only around 28,000 were ever made. The SL26 cost 628.23 DM, and two accessory lenses were available for it: the wide-angle Pro-Tessar (f/3.2, 28 mm) costing 232.43 DM, and the Pro-Tessar (f/3.2, 28 mm) costing 282.88 DM.

==== Rolleiflex SL35 ====
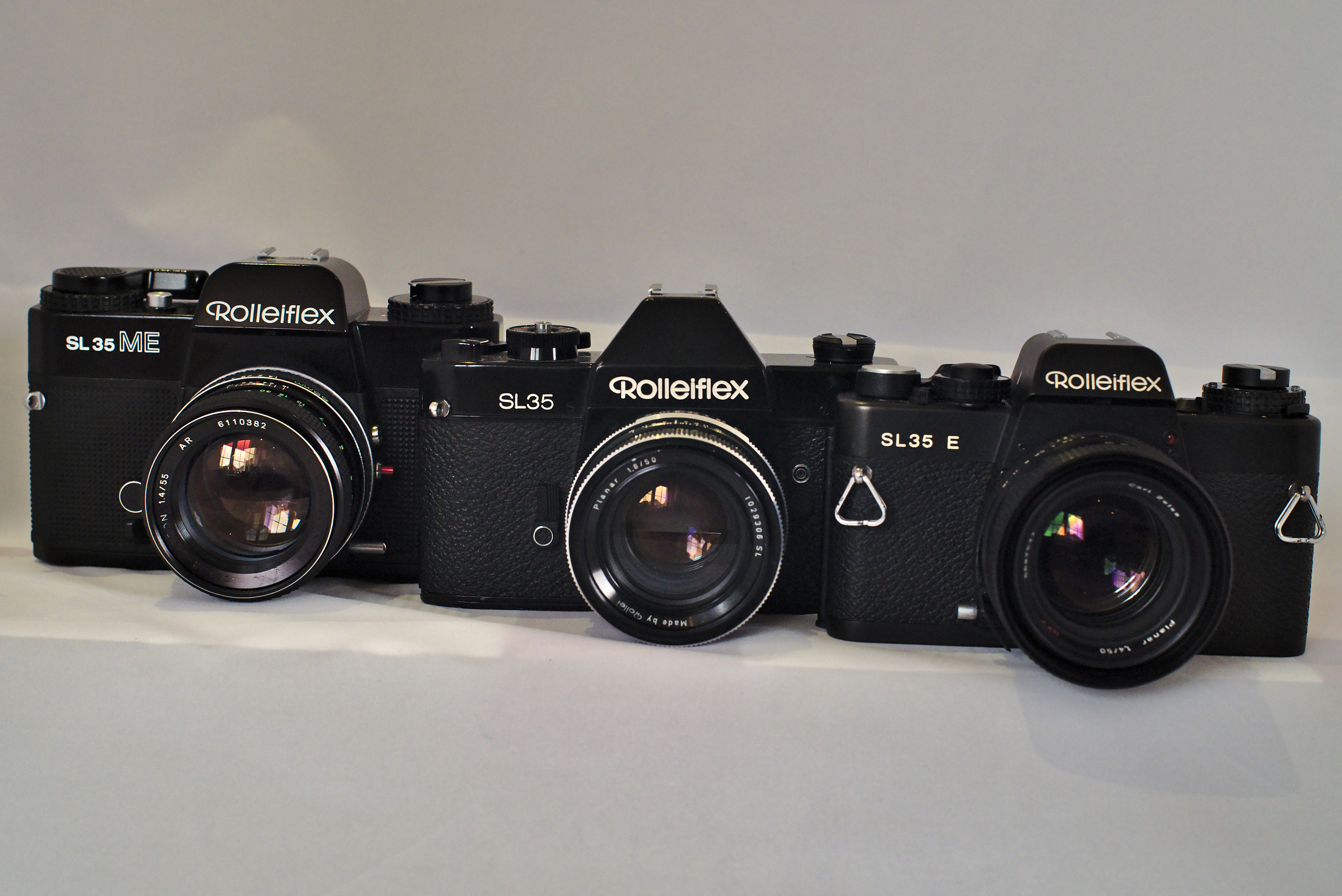
Left to right: Rolleiflex SL35 ME, SL35, SL35 E

After 35 mm SLR cameras became popular, Rollei began to develop its own 35 mm product line in 1966; but it was already too late – just as the SL66 project had been. Rollei now faced competition – not from a small company like Hasselblad, but from large, well-financed Japanese companies who could afford to advertise heavily in glossy magazines and trade journals. What is more, they invited photographic dealers to Japan to view their factories.

The Rolleiflex SL35 was introduced in 1970; it was quite compact and comparable in price (675 DM) and quality with Japanese cameras. Rollei had modelled its design on the top-selling 35 mm SLR camera of the time, the Pentax Spotmatic, although it did not surpass it in quality.

Rollei introduced a new bayonet lens mount for the SL35, the Quick Bayonet Mount (QBM). Besides a choice of two standard f/1.8, 50 mm lenses (either a Zeiss Planar or a Schneider SL-Xenon), the initial lens range included:

- Distagon f/2.8, 25 mm
- Distagon f/2.8, 35 mm
- Sonnar f/2.8, 85 mm
- Tele Tessar f/4, 135 mm
- Tele Tessar f/4, 200 mm

At this point Rollei still lagged behind the large Japanese companies who already offered fish-eye lenses, super-telephoto lenses and zoom lenses. Although few amateur photographers purchased lenses such as these in the early 1970s, from a marketing perspective, statements published in camera reviews like "lenses available with focal lengths from 7.5 mm to 800 mm" sounded more impressive than "... from 25 to 200 mm". Consequently, Rollei soon expanded their range; by 1973 a total of 16 lenses (all with fixed focal-lengths) were available for the Rolleiflex SL35: 13 from Carl Zeiss (Oberkochen), and 3 from Schneider-Kreuznach.

In 1974 Rollei introduced the SL350, the successor to the SL35. Despite state-of-the-art open-aperture metering, which was promoted with the catch-phrase "concentration on the essentials", sales of the camera were rather poor. In 1976 Rollei unexpectedly withdrew the SL350 (the last 35 mm camera "Made in Germany" until Rollei went bankrupt) from sale in favour of the SL35 M – a camera derived from obsolete technology acquired through Rollei's purchase of Zeiss Ikon. In comparison to the elegant design of the SL35, the SL35 M was clumsy and unreliable. Next, Rollei went on to develop the SL35 ME, its first SLR with aperture priority metering – some four years after the Japanese. Low-cost mass production in Singapore allowed Rollei to offer the SL35 ME at a very attractive price. In spite of this, sales were well below expectations. Rollei's research and development department continued to follow the basic philosophy it had established for its medium format cameras: adding more electronics. In 1978, Rollei introduced a new, electronically controlled camera, the SL35 E. However, it lacked the reliability that was now expected of consumer products. One weak point, for example, was the mirror mechanism.

After Canon introduced the AE-1 (the first 35 mm SLR to include a micro-processor), and Minolta introduced the XD-7 (the first SLR to feature multiple automatic exposure modes – shutter priority and aperture priority), camera buyers lost interest in Rollei and its products; on the other hand, very few noticed the flaws either. As a result, Rollei was relegated to the fringe, its sales lagging well behind Minolta, Pentax, Canon, Nikon and Contax-Yashica.

In the mid-1970s, third-party lenses increased in popularity. This trend made it difficult for Rollei to maintain its declining market share because third-party lens makers were reluctant to produce Rollei-compatible lenses; low sales of Rollei cameras made it uneconomic for them to do so.

As a result, Rollei's customer base, which formerly consisted of enthusiastic amateurs, was now dominated by casual photographers. Although they generally preferred German-made products, they were much less inclined to buy expensive camera accessories. Nevertheless, Rollei sold 333,000 units of the SL35 and 120,000 units of its successor, the SL35 E, including sales of virtually identical models from Voigtländer.

==== Rollei 35RF ====
The Rollei 35RF was a compact camera with a fixed f/2.8, 38 mm lens. Despite the similarity in names, this camera should not be confused with its modern (2002) namesake, the Rollei 35 RF – a rangefinder camera with a Leica M bayonet lens mount manufactured by Cosina Voigtländer and marketed by Rollei Fototechnic.

==== Flash units ====
In 1967, Rollei started to sell flash units, but without much success as this market was already crowded with offerings from other manufacturers – not just other camera makers, but also consumer electronics companies such as Metz.

The Rollei Strobomatic E66 costing 548 DM was the first electronic flash on the market, but not for long. The Strobofix, a similar model without a brightness control, sold for 357 DM. Rollei subsequently released many more variants. In 1968, Rollei introduced flash units for studio photography; there were three models (E250, E1250 and E5000), each with a different flash head. A special feature of Rollei's studio flash units was a modeling light – a halogen lamp integrated into the flash head. This helped the photographer to adjust the lighting and select the most appropriate aperture.

==== Super 8 ====
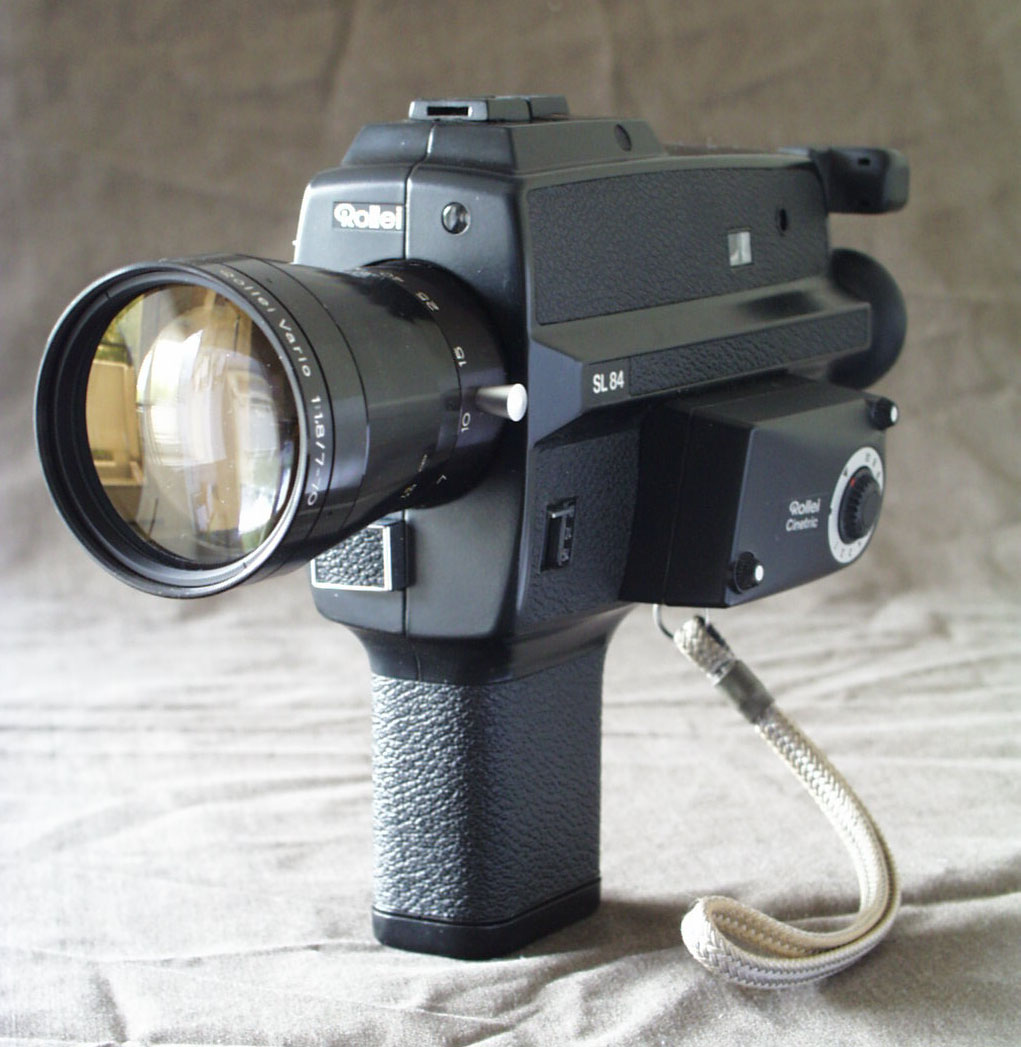
Rollei SL 84 (by Bauer)

The advent of Super 8 film created a booming home movie market. This development had not gone unnoticed by Peesel, who decided that Rollei, too, should offer products for this new and expanding segment of the market. As Rollei lacked the resources in Braunschweig to develop or manufacture such products itself, it decided instead to resell (under the Rollei brand) products made by Bauer (a Bosch subsidiary in Germany) and Silma (in Italy).

==== Uelzen ====
In the meanwhile, Rollei's product range had expanded considerably and it had outgrown the factory in Salzdahlumer Straße. Furthermore, recruiting new employees locally in the Braunschweig area had become increasingly difficult as around half of the local workforce was now employed by Volkswagen. Consequently, Peesel embarked on a search for a suitable location for a branch factory, preferably in an underdeveloped area within reach of Braunschweig. He selected Uelzen, a town some 80 km (50 mi) distant from Braunschweig; it was within 1 hours drive from Hamburg, Hannover, Braunschweig and Salzgitter, and well-situated on a branch of the Elbe Canal. What is more, as Uelzen lay within the economically depressed East–west border zone, Rollei would qualify for government subsidies.

After purchasing a 3 ha (7 1/2 acres) plot of land, Rollei began construction of new buildings that would provide 6,000 square metres (1 1/2 acres)) of factory space, with plans for two future building projects. The first stage, completed in 1970, was used to manufacture slide projectors, studio flash systems and, later on, the Rolleimat Universal enlarger. However, the factory at Uelzen became redundant after Rollei transferred most of its production to Singapore. The site was put up for sale, but no buyer was found and the factory finally closed on 1 October 1977. The buildings stood empty until 1981.

==== Viewfinder cameras ====
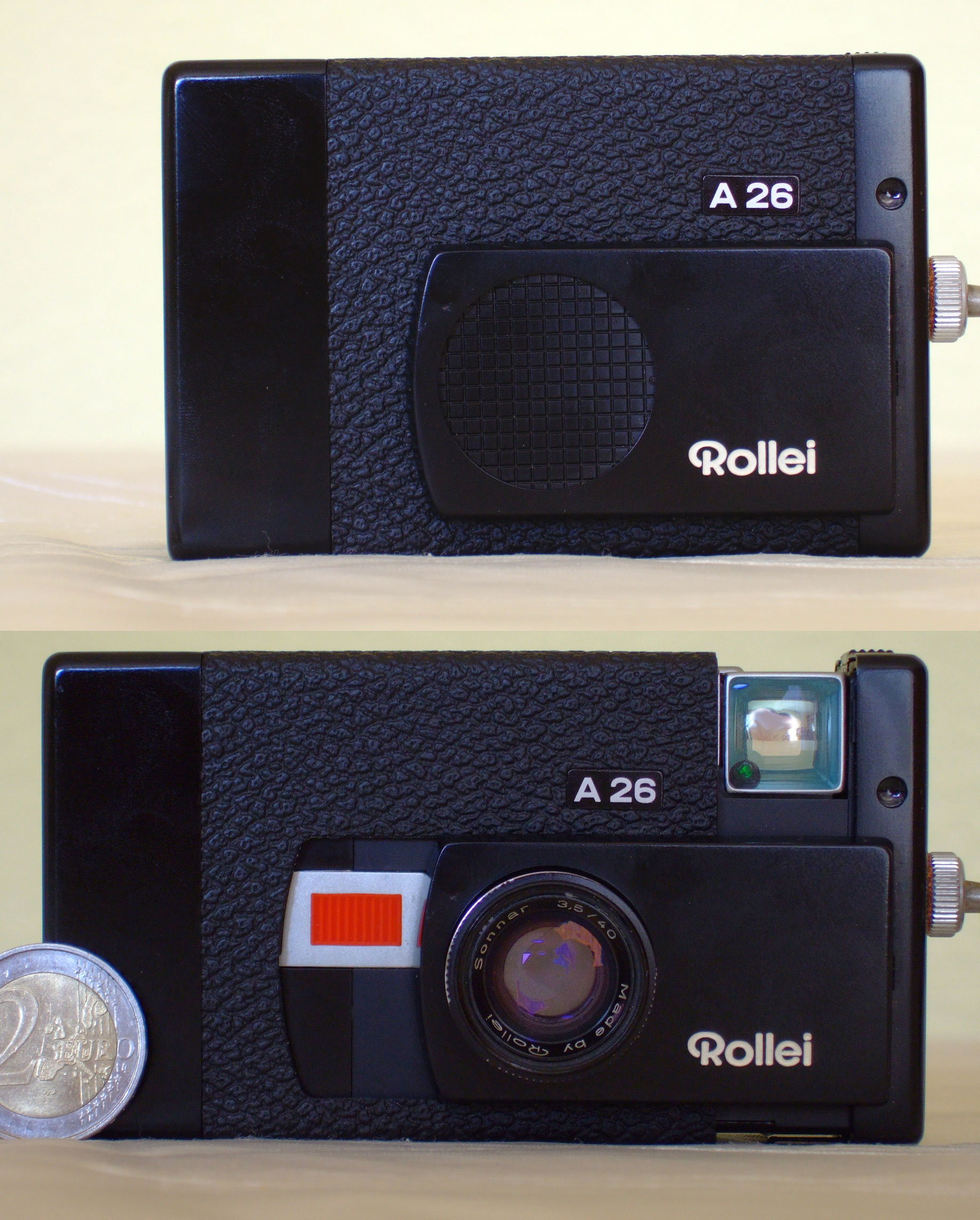
Rollei A 26

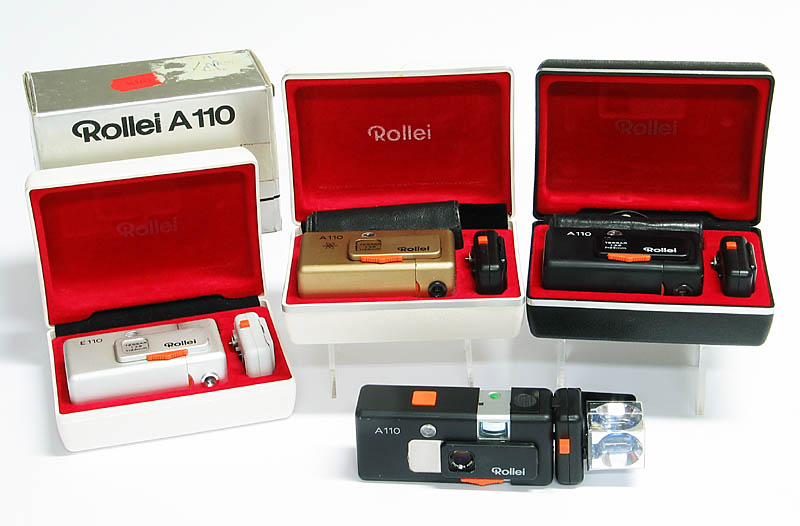
Rollei A 110 pocket cameras

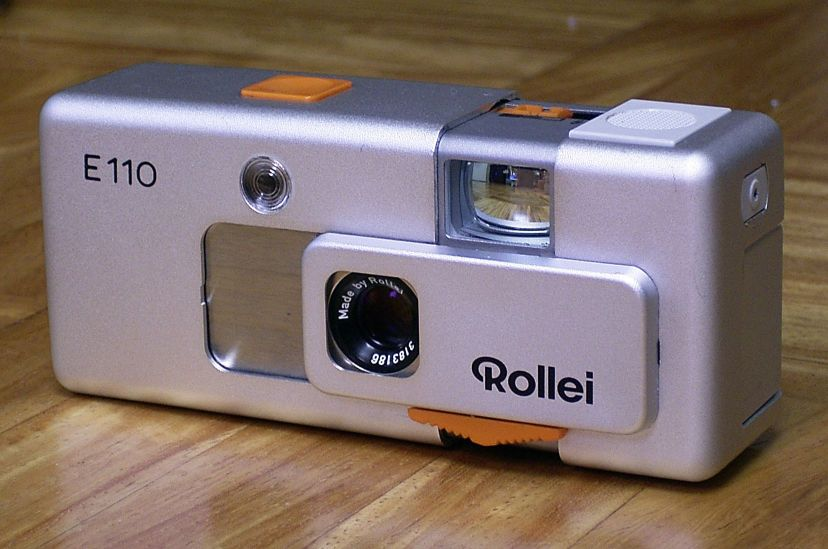
Rollei E 110

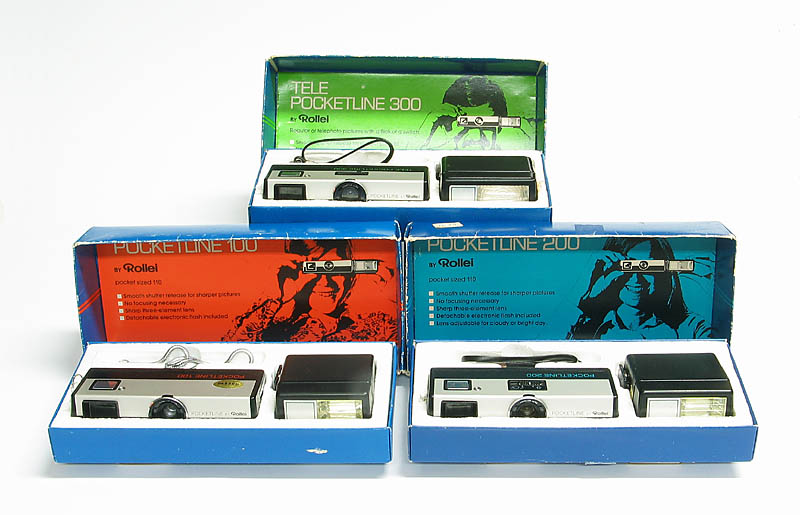
PocketLine by Rollei

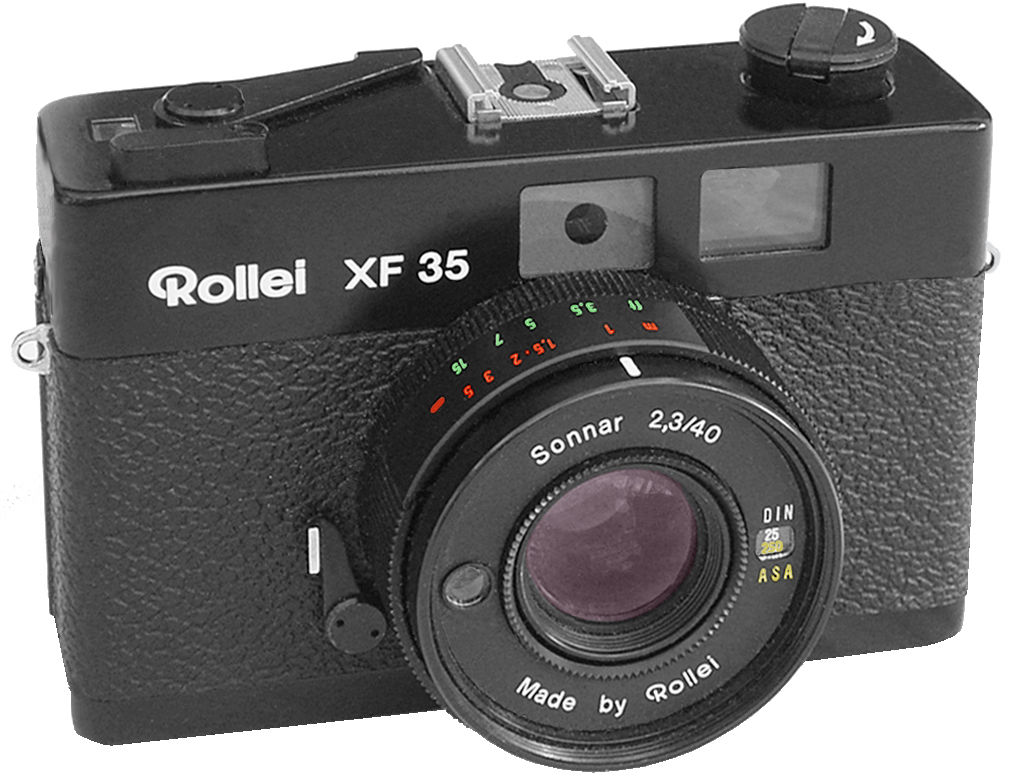
Rollei XF 35

Rollei made other viewfinder cameras besides the Rollei 16 and the Rollei 35, the best-known of which were the A 26 and the A 110 / E 110. The A 26 was the smallest camera that used Instamatic (126) film cartridges. It was cleverly designed, folding together to protect the lens and the viewfinder.

The A 110 was positioned as a successor to the Rollei 16; it was a pocket-sized camera that used 110 film cartridges. The A 110 was compact, stylish and highly regarded. Later on, Rollei released a cheaper alternative in silver, the E 110. Both models sold extremely well – the A 26 achieved sales of almost 140,000 units, while over 240,000 pocket cameras were sold.

Between 1977 and 1979, Rollei commissioned a little known Japanese company to manufacture a range of three basic pocket cameras taking 110 film. These were sold under the brand name Pocketline by Rollei. However, sales were poor, although precise sales figures are unavailable.

From 1974 onwards, Rollei introduced various 35 mm cameras of conventional design, including the Rolleimat and the Rollei XF 35. Some were sold under the Voigtländer brand with different model names, while others were made in Japan.

==== Singapore ====
Although wages in Germany were low to begin with, they increased steadily, which prompted Peesel to negotiate an exclusive agreement with the government of Singapore in 1970 to manufacture photographic equipment there. In return, he promised to create 10,000 new jobs by the year 1980.

Clearly, Rollei would not be able to finance an expansion on this scale itself, so it approached two regional German banks – the Norddeutsche Landesbank and the Hessische Landesbank – who subsequently became shareholders in the company. In those days, risky investments such as this were not that uncommon; Peesel's imperious demeanor within Rollei had so impressed the bankers that they were confident of their investment. Only after the collapse of the Herstatt Bank did financial institutions become more prudent in their lending.

Rollei's factory in Singapore astounded everyone, especially those outside of Germany; at that time not even the Japanese had successfully managed to carry out precision manufacturing on the Asian continent. Although Rollei Singapore was fully autonomous, it did not do any product development.

In 1974, Rollei's workforce was distributed as follows: 1,648 in Braunschweig, 314 in Uelzen, and 5,696 in Singapore. Although the Rollei 35 was selling well and all of the production of amateur cameras had been transferred to Singapore, there was insufficient work to keep the enormous workforce busy. Consequently, after a long and draw-out start-up phase, contracts to manufacture on behalf of third-parties were accepted from 1979.

When Rollei Deutschland filed for bankruptcy in 1981, Rollei camera products still accounted for 97% of the production capacity in Singapore, which meant that the factory had to close. USH (United Scientific Holdings – see New owners) established a new company called Rolloptik Ltd. in order to purchase and store the plant and machinery. This would make it possible to restart production in Asia later on should this be necessary.

==== Voigtländer ====
The Braunschweig-based camera manufacturer Voigtländer closed down on 23 August 1971, whereupon the German mail-order firm Quelle GmbH (Foto-Quelle) entered into take-over negotiations, but no agreement could be reached. In the end, Voigtländer's assets were divided according to a scheme devised by Peesel: Rollei, Carl Zeiss and the state of Niedersachsen would each receive one third shares with Rollei retaining exclusive rights to its brand names. As a result, a new company called Optische Werke Voigtländer was established on 1 March 1972 with 320 employees to manufacture lenses for both Rollei and Zeiss Ikon cameras. In addition, Rollei took on 300 former Voigtländer employees.

After Zeiss Ikon stopped making cameras in 1972, the company Voigtländer Vertriebsgesellschaft mbH was established in 1974 purely to sell cameras. There was, however, no clear distinction between Voigtländer and Rollei cameras, and many models were sold under both brand names. This even applied to 35 mm SLR cameras, whereby their common lens mount was now referred to as the Rollei/Voigtländer bayonet. Although the trade press regarded the takeover as a long overdue consolidation of the camera industry in Braunschweig, the merger made no sense from a business perspective; from it Rollei gained neither new products nor new customers, nor did it have any use for the additional production capacity and employees it acquired – all the more because the factory in Singapore was under-utilised.

=== 1975 to 1981 – Peperzak / Wehling / Porst era ===
==== Downsizing the company ====
On 26 August 1974, after Rollei made a loss of 37 million DM on revenue of just 137 million DM, Peesel left the company "by mutual agreement". At this point Rollei's debts amounted to around 500 million DM, which meant that the banks effectively owned 97% of the company. The banks considered liquidating Rollei, but decided instead that restructuring the company would be more worthwhile, setting out the following requirements:

- Reducing the workforce in Singapore by 50%
- Reducing the workforce in Braunschweig by 500
- Selling the factory in Uelzen
- Winding up the company Optische Werke Voigtländer

As a result, in the first half of 1975, the combined workforce (of both Rollei and Voigtländer) was reduced from 2,400 to 1,800 employees. On 1 April, Peter Canisius Josef Peperzak, the former head of Canon in Germany, took over the leadership of Rollei with the intention of fundamentally changing its pricing and marketing policy.

==== Rolleiflex SLX ====
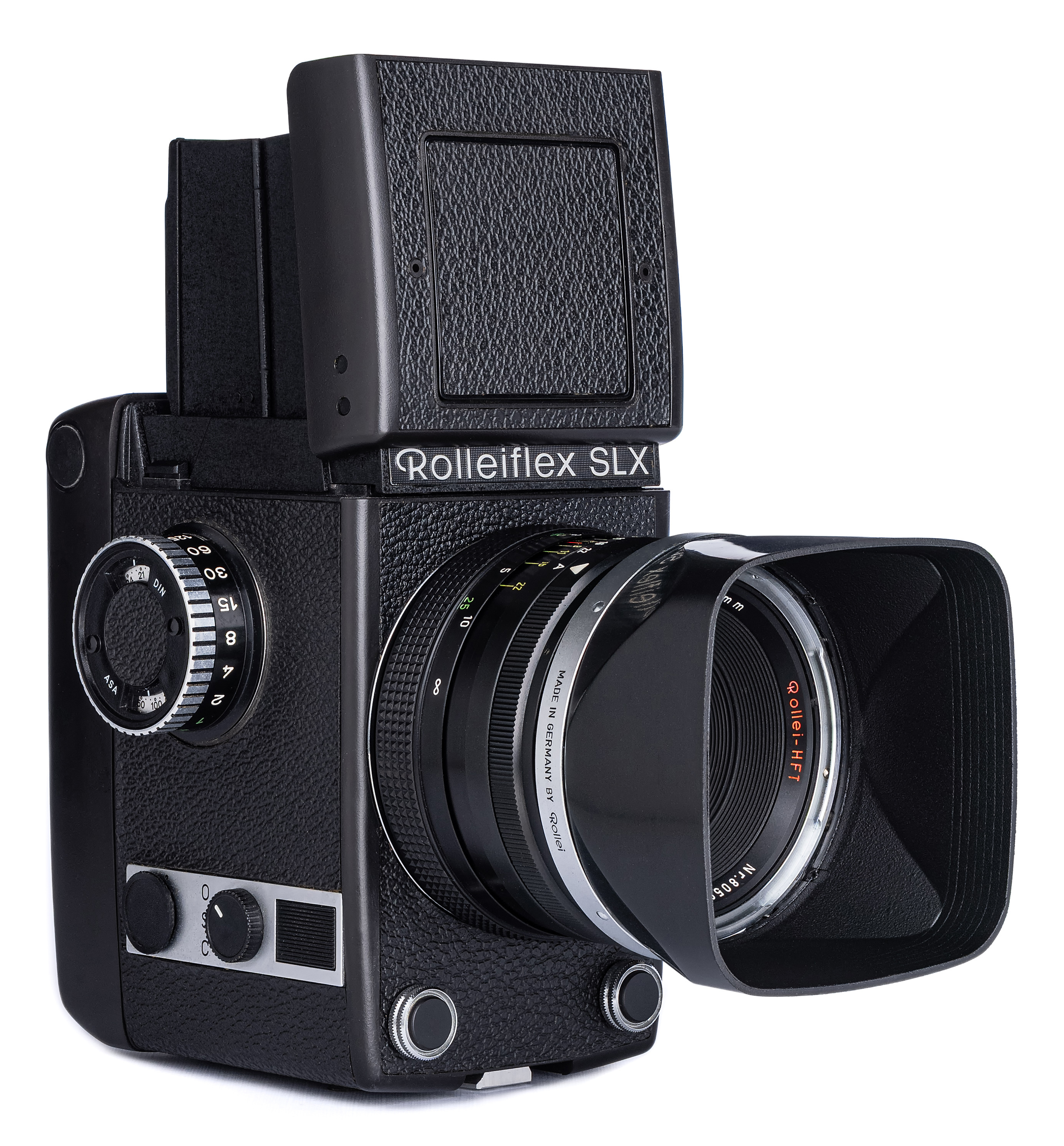
Rolleiflex SLX

Rollei had already shown the Rolleiflex SLX to selected journalists in Singapore in 1973, and presented it at photokina (Germany) in 1974, but this innovative camera did not go into production until September 1976. It was the first microprocessor-controlled medium format camera in the world, whereby the aperture and shutter speed were set electronically via two linear electric motors built into the lens. This technology was expensive and rather unreliable to begin with, but the advantages were compelling nonetheless. An updated model with improved electronics was subsequently released in 1978. Most importantly, these innovations allowed Rollei to distinguish itself from Hasselblad. Its Swedish rival promoted the extraordinary reliability of its cameras, as shown by the role Hasselblad cameras played in the missions to the Moon – publicity that was impossible to trump. Rollei, on the other hand, emphasised the advanced electronics and ease of use of its cameras. The SLX lacked an exchangeable film magazine, although a Polaroid back was available. When it was introduced, the SLX cost 5,998 DM.

==== Dissolve projectors ====
At photokina 1976, Rollei presented the Rollei P3800, the first 35 mm slide projector in the world with on-board dissolve capability, using two projection lenses. This product generated renewed interest in the company, because, prior to this, dissolving required two projectors connected to a special controller. But the P3800 made this effortless, like running a normal slide-show. Above all, there was no longer any need to alternately load the slides into two magazines. The P3800 was made in Singapore starting from 1980 and cost 1,000 DM.

Several successors followed, including the Rolleivision 35 twin (1986), MSC 300/300P (1995–1998), MSC 310/320s/330P (1998–2003), MSC 315/325P and 535P (2003–2014); the final generation of Rolleivision twin projectors also includes the 535P, a "P"rofessional (or "P"rogrammable) version which uses 250 watt bulbs.

==== Rolleimatic ====
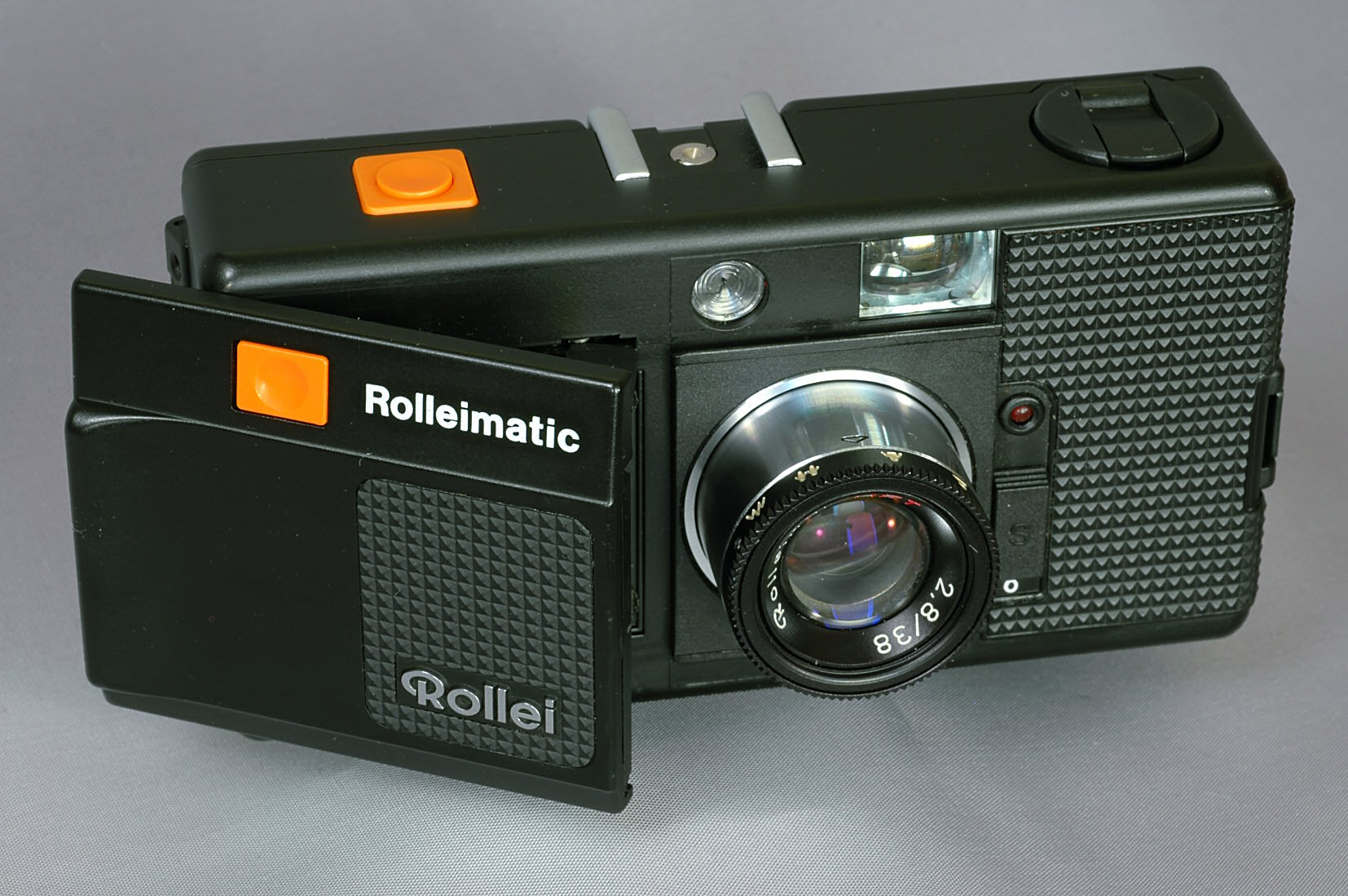
Front view of a Rolleimatic

Rolleimatic

The Rolleimatic was the last new camera to go into production before Rollei went bankrupt. It was conceived as a 35 mm viewfinder camera of new design that would be (almost) as easy to use as cameras that used Instamatic film cassettes, but delivering better image quality. Planning started in 1977 and the cameras were manufactured between June 1980 and September 1981. The Rolleimatic was released onto the market without being subjected to the extensive testing that was usual, with the result that it suffered from unreliability, just like the SL35 E had before it. Rollei's bankruptcy brought production to an early end.

==== Under Nord/LB management ====
Perzak's behaviour became increasingly erratic; in an attempt to save the factory at Uelzen, he got Kaiser Fototechnik in Buchen to develop an enlarger, which Rollei sold as the Rolleimat Universal. Although it was extremely popular, the market for amateur photo-laboratories was much too small to make any difference to Rollei. Furthermore, for some obscure reason, he purchased tripods and 35 mm lenses from Japanese companies, fixed focal length lenses from Mamiya, and zoom lenses from Tokina – even though Rollei had enough spare production capacity in Singapore to make them all itself. With the new Rolleinar 35 mm lenses, Rollei was finally able to match the range of focal lengths offered by its competitors. On top of that, Peperzak cancelled Rollei's appearance at photokina 1978. In the end, he left Rollei on 28 February.

The Norddeutsche Landesbank (Nord/LB) then appointed Heinz Wehling to manage the company on 1 March 1978. So, Rollei was able to exhibit at photokina after all, but not in its customary location – that had already been allocated. He negotiated a contract with IEC, the Industria De Equipamentos Cinematograficos S. A. in São Leopoldo, Brazil to manufacture Rollei slide projectors and enlargers under license. Unfortunately, Wehling was no more successful than his predecessor; in particular, he remained committed to 35 mm SLR cameras, even developing a new camera for the range, and steadfastly refused to close the factory in Singapore. Rollei was now perilously close to bankruptcy, so the search began for a new owner.

==== Hannsheinz Porst ====
Obviously, the new owner could not be a Japanese company. Since neither Agfa, Kodak nor Zeiss were interested, Deutsche Fotoholding GmbH, a company founded by Hannsheinz Porst, took over 97% of Rollei Germany on 1 April 1981, with the option of purchasing 75% of Nord/LB's share of Rollei Singapore in 1982. The chairman of Nord/LB's board of directors greeted this event with the words, "Thank goodness, I am finally rid of Rollei...".

The takeover by Hannsheinz Porst was met with universal astonishment as his own company Photo Porst was already in trouble. Also, many wondered who, actually, was behind the holding company. Rumour had it that Agfa had taken a share in order to avoid restrictions from the German Federal Cartel Office. The management of Rollei was shared between Otto Stemmer, a former employee of Agfa who became the technical director, and Hannsheinz Porst, who became chairman of the board.

Porst announced his strategy for the company:

- withdrawal from the pocket camera market, which was declining rapidly
- avoid the bottom end of the market
- 35 mm viewfinder cameras
- 35 mm and middle format cameras for the top end of the market
- slide projectors
- advanced flash units
- no more Rollei Super 8 cameras, which were hardly selling anyway

Yet nobody took much interest as all confidence in Porst, Rollei and Nord/LB had already been lost. Hannsheinz Porst was especially disappointed when he failed to gain the support of the photographic trade. As a result, Rollei's turnover declined by 20% from March 1981. In addition, the Yen and the Singapore Dollar had appreciated strongly in value, which significantly increased the cost of the products that Peperzak had earlier contracted to import from Asia. Mired in debt and close to bankruptcy, Porst finally filed an application on 3 July 1981 in the District Court of Braunschweig to put Rollei into voluntary administration. The court-appointed administrator announced that Rollei's professional products and services division would be retained, that production would continue until the end of September, and that some employees would be laid off in October. The estimated value of Rollei's unsold inventory was put at about 100 million DM. An advertising campaign was mounted to sell the remaining stock, and advertisements were placed in photographic magazines highlighting the fact that this would be the last opportunity to buy accessories for older Rollei cameras. The rights to the Voigtländer brand name were sold to the Plusfoto Group for 100,000 DM. Some 700 employees were still working for Rollei in 1981.

=== 1982 to 2003 – Rollei Fototechnic / USH / Mandermann / Samsung / Dume / Capitellum era ===
==== New owners ====
On 1 January 1982, Rollei split into three separate companies: Rollei Deutschland GmbH assumed responsibility for disposing of the remaining stock and servicing its former products, while Rollei Gebäude GmbH together with Nord/LB, its largest creditor, took over its properties and the management of its former production facilities. A new company called Rollei Fototechnic GmbH employing 380 workers manufactured, sold and (until 1 July 1983) serviced a "rationalised" range of cameras, lenses and slide projectors. This company, which had nothing more to do with the former Rollei company up until the takeover of its "leading designs", was 100% owned by USH (United Scientific Holdings). The London-based USH was founded after the war to manufacture optoelectronic instruments. Rollei initially made contact with USH through its Singapore subsidiary, Avimo Ltd.

The intention was to collaborate in the development of products for the German military. As a result, Rollei began to make 7×42 binoculars, otherwise USH exerted no influence over Rollei's camera product line. Rollei simply made the products and received test and measurement instruments from USH in return – equipment that it would otherwise have built itself. Consequently, collaboration with USH proved to be extremely beneficial to Rollei. Rollei Fototechnic GmbH concentrated on system cameras, which were still made in Braunschweig, and slide projectors, which were made in Singapore until 1983. After that, production of slide projectors was transferred back to Germany so that they, too, could be marketed under the catch phrase "Made in Germany". The P801 slide projector was initially made by Silma in Italy, but its successor, as expected, was also made in Braunschweig. These products were manufactured in leased premises within Rollei's former factory. Only a quarter of the available space was required; the remainder was utilised by companies unconnected with the photography industry.

After USH's strategy to manufacture for the military market failed, Rollei was sold to Heinrich Mandermann on 10 June 1987 for the symbolic price of 1 DM together with 14 million DM in debts. Mandermann was a German photographic industrialist, who had owned Schneider Kreuznach since 1982.

Early in 1995, Rollei was purchased by Samsung Techwin, a part of the South Korean conglomerate Samsung Group. After the 1997 Asian financial crisis, Paul Dume and six former Rollei managers purchased Rollei in 1999 in a management buyout. In November 2002, Rollei was taken over by Capitellum A/S, a Danish investment company based in Copenhagen.

==== Rolleiflex SL2000 F ====
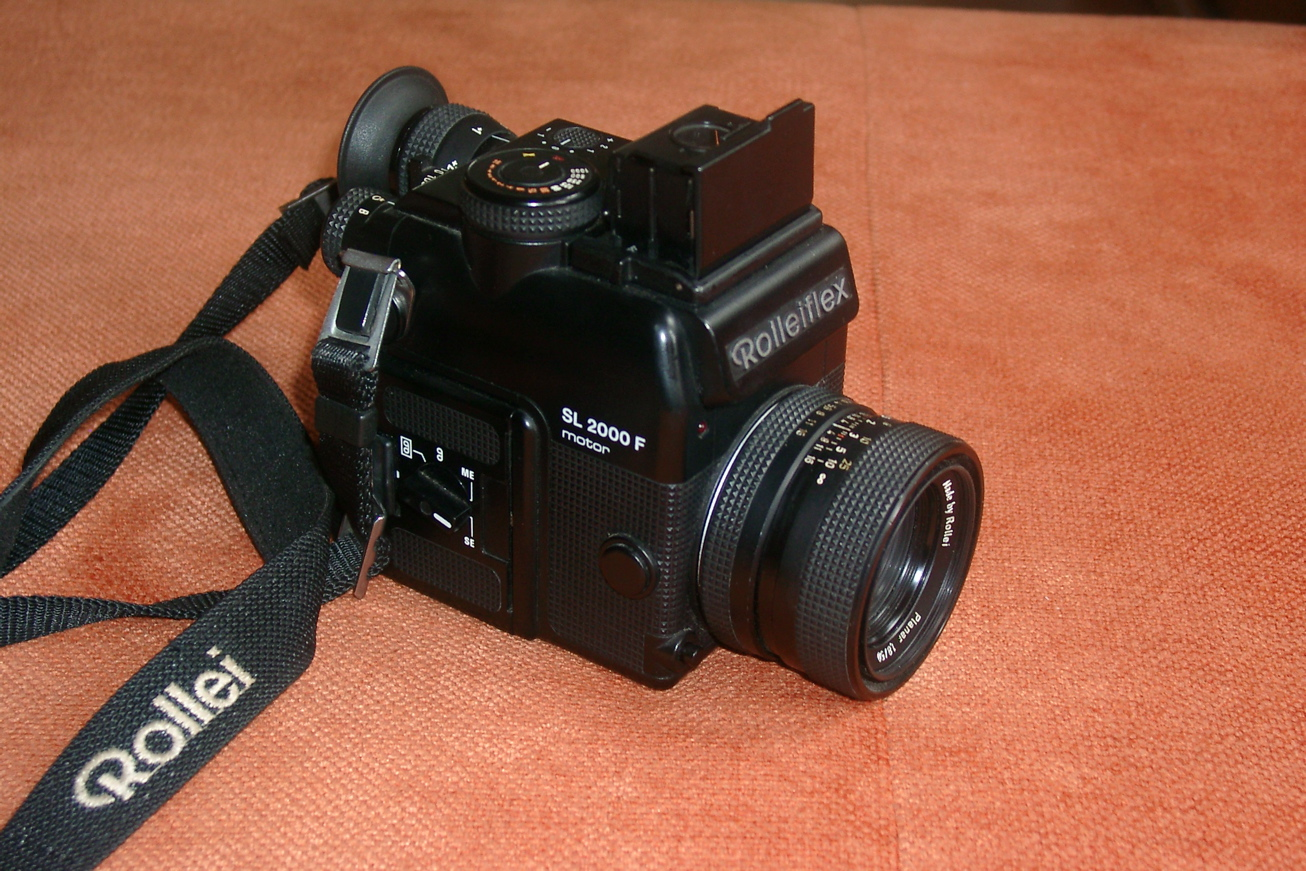
Rolleiflex SL2000 F

In the summer of 1981, Rollei introduced the Rolleiflex SL2000 F, a sophisticated SLR camera using the same QBM lenses as the preceding SL35 system. At that time it was the only 35 mm camera that offered interchangeable film backs and dual viewfinders. Development of this camera began in 1975 and a prototype was exhibited at photokina 1978. One year later, however, the project was suspended due to lack of funding, although it was eventually resumed and completed. The features that were borrowed from Rollei's medium format cameras certainly attracted interest, but the high price and limited range of accessories put off many potential buyers, even though a full range of lenses with focal lengths from 14 mm to 1000 mm was available. An improved version, the Rolleiflex 3003, was introduced at photokina 1984. Rollei eventually withdrew from the SLR market in 1994. By this time, all 35 mm SLRs included autofocus as a standard feature and Rollei was simply no longer able to keep up. The high price of the SL2000 F / 3003 range meant that it only ever appealed to serious amateurs, with the result that only 15,000 units were sold.

==== Rollei Metric ====
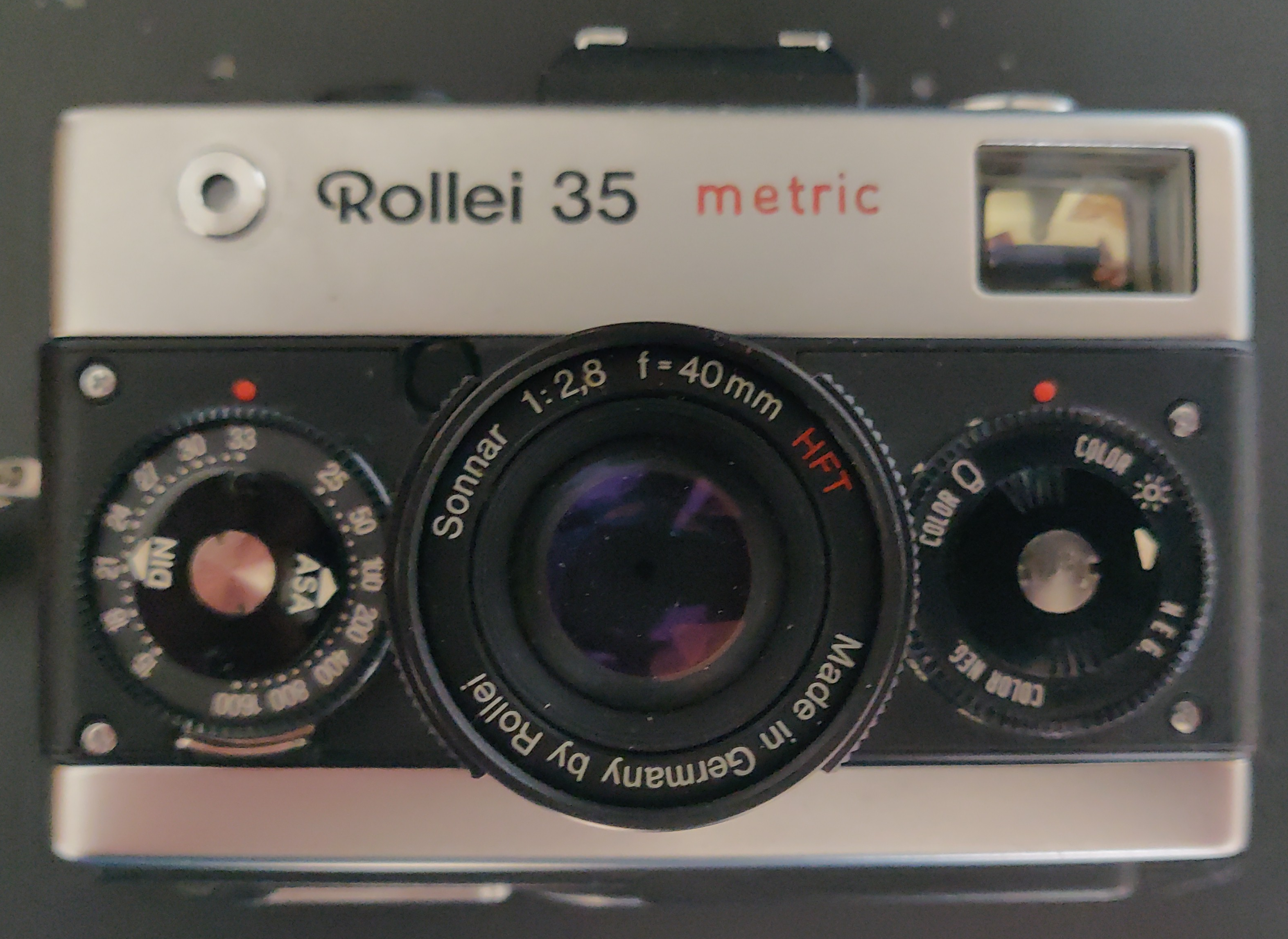
Rollei 35 metric

In 1986, Rollei started making metric surveying systems. This project was instigated by Wilfried Wester-Ebbinghaus, a research associate at Rollei who wanted a camera adapted for the purpose of photogrammetry. Accordingly, especially calibrated cameras were developed along with computer programmes to analyse the resultant images: the 35 metric, the 3003 metric and the 6006 metric cameras incorporated a glass plate in front of the back plane inscribed with grid lines which – as famously shown on the photographs taken during the Apollo Moon missions – were visible on the photographic image. Rollei's system was substantially cheaper than other high-end systems of the time. There was close collaboration with the Braunschweig University of Technology on this project.

==== "Classic" project ====
Interest in twin-lens Rollei cameras declined in the 1970s so much that the Rolleicord was discontinued in 1976, while the Rolleiflex was only available on special order from 1977. Although there was some revival in interest shortly thereafter, production ceased altogether after Rollei went into voluntary administration. Nonetheless, 1,250 gold-plated Rolleiflexes were assembled in 1982 from the remaining componentry and sold as the 2.8F Gold for 4,000 DM. In 1987, a much-admired successor, the Rolleiflex 2.8 GX, was released which naturally featured the latest in TTL and flash metering. The 2.8 GX sold for 2,800 DM, which was not exactly cheap, but a reasonable price considering the low production volumes.

Rollei then introduced the 2.8 FX in 2001, a modernised version featuring the Rolleiflex logo of the 1930s. In fact, a wide-angled version of this camera is available once more. So, the number of Rollei cameras produced increased yet further – albeit slowly – reaching a total of 3.2 million units. Similarly, a classic version of the Rollei 35 was available for a period of time: the Rollei 35 classic was presented at photokina 1990 and sold for 2,200 DM with a flash unit. See Rollei 35.

==== Rollei rangefinders ====
Following a trend towards rangefinder cameras, Rollei introduced the QZ 35T/35W fixed-lens autofocus cameras that featured an electronic rangefinder, similar to the competing Contax G line of cameras. These were sophisticated, titanium-clad point and shoot cameras priced for the luxury market, designed by F.A. Porsche, featuring a broad range of shutter speeds and autoexposure modes. They were sold in two versions: the 35T had a 38~90 mm f/2.8~5.6 lens, while the 35W had a 28~60 mm f/2.8~5.6 lens, both branded S- VarioApogon.

The firm followed the rangefinder trend and introduced the Rollei 35 RF in 2002. Yet the 35 RF was neither developed by Rollei, nor was it based on any of the earlier variants of the Rollei 35. Instead, it was derived from the Cosina Voigtländer Bessa R series of rangefinder cameras; The Rollei 35 was nearly identical to the camera sold as the Voigtländer Bessa R2. Like the Voigtländer Bessa R-series and Zeiss Ikon cameras from Cosina, it utilised a bayonet lens mount derived from the Leica M3. Rollei offered three lenses of its own design made by Zeiss. The Rollei 35 RF is no longer in production, and it appears that not many were sold.

==== Prego cameras ====
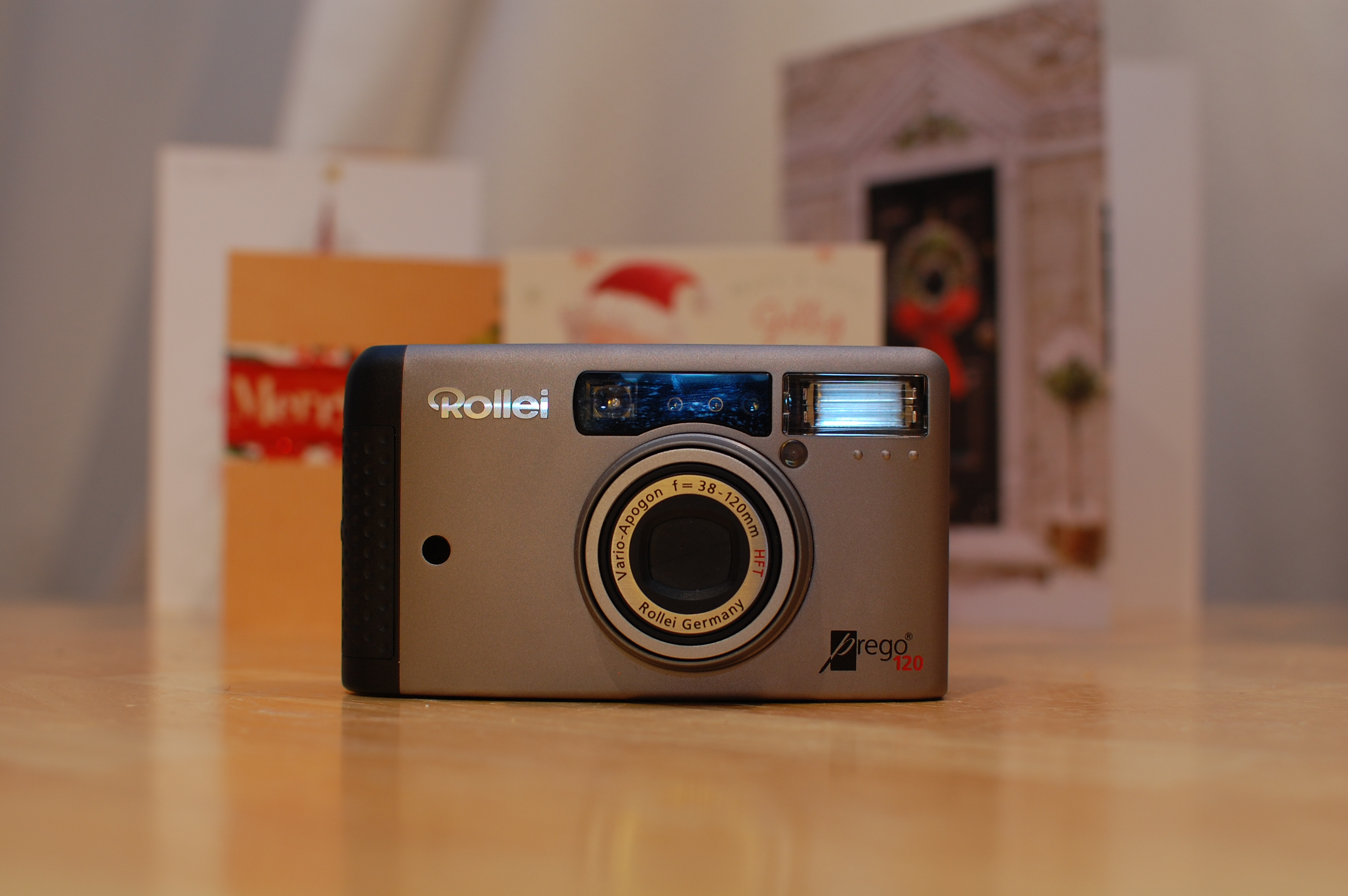
Rollei Prego 120, a 35 mm film point-and-shoot

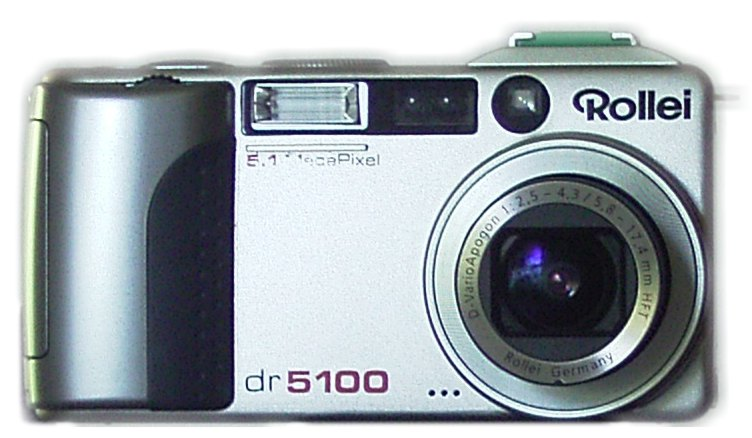
Rollei dr5100 digital camera, identical to the Ricoh Caplio GX

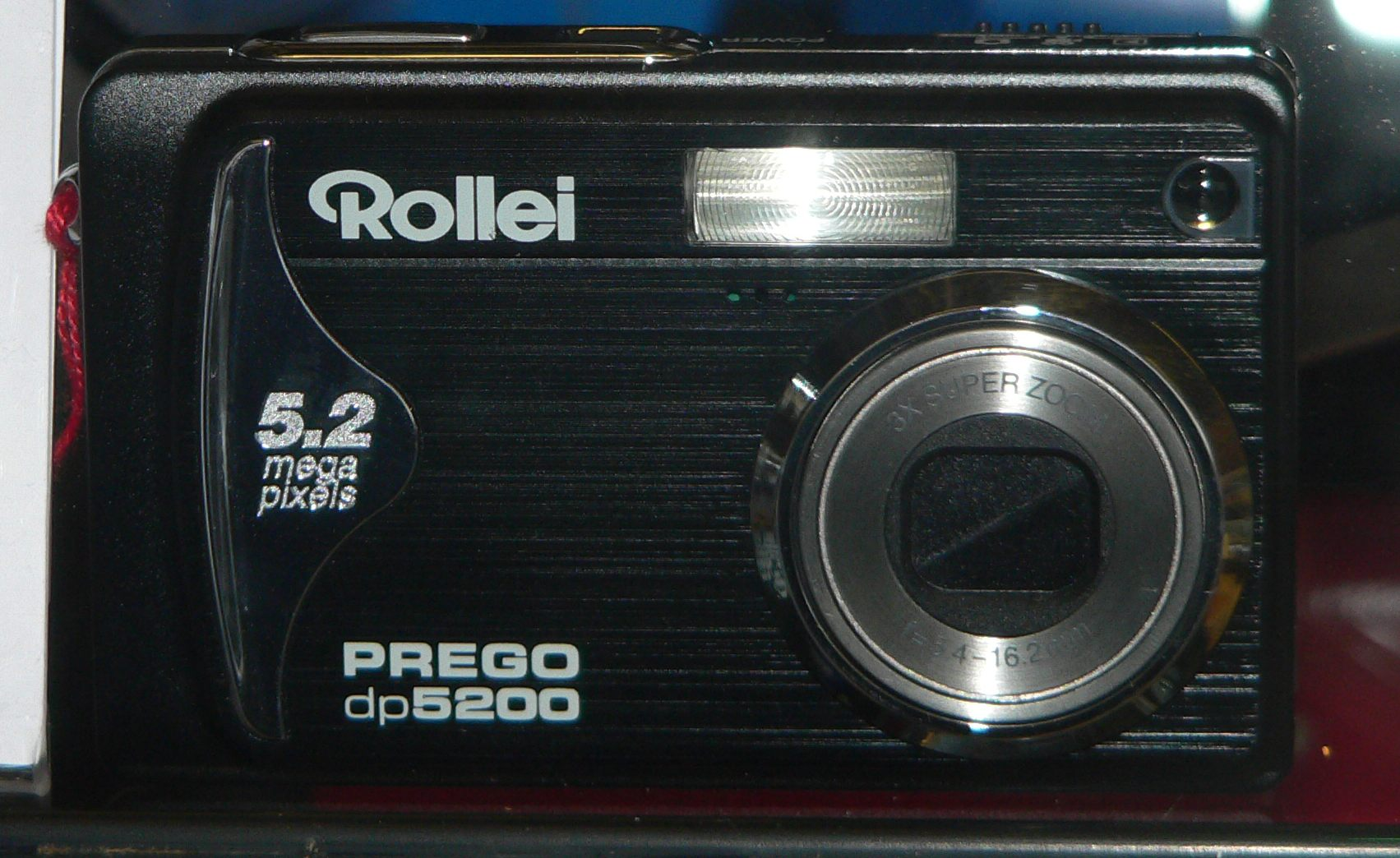
Rollei Prego dp5200 digital camera

Despite an earlier resolution to avoid the mass market, Rollei began to sell a range of viewfinder cameras for the amateur market. The cameras were made in Asia by Skanhex, Premier, Kyocera and Ricoh, among others, and sold under the brand name Rollei Prego. The product line initially consisted solely of 35 mm cameras; digital cameras were added later on – Rollei even began to develop these itself.

==== Single-lens medium format systems ====
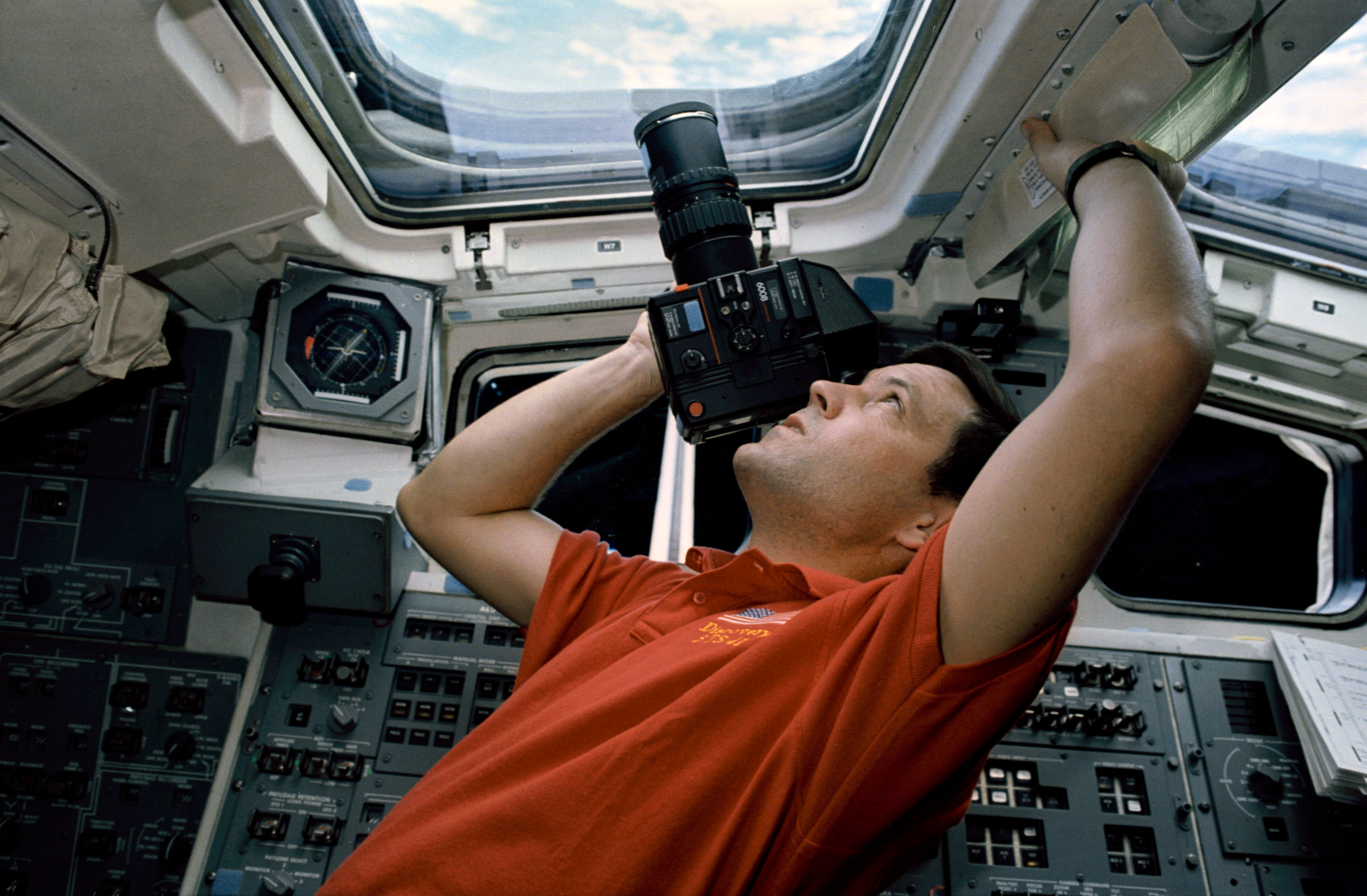
Pilot Robert D. Cabana uses a Rolleiflex 6008 aboard Discovery during STS-41

Single-lens medium format cameras represented Rollei's most important market segment. Consequently, development of the SLX continued, resulting in the Rolleiflex 6000 System which was introduced in 1984 with the 6006. Significant improvements included a film magazine and TTL flash metering – superior technology that made it the leading medium format camera. The 6002 followed in 1986, an entry-level model without a film magazine along with three inexpensive lenses (f/4, 50 mm; f/2.8, 80 mm; f/4, 150 mm). For the first time Rollei offered low-cost lenses from Asia, although all of the other lenses were still made by Schneider and Zeiss. In 1988, Rollei introduced the 6008. In addition to improved electronics, this was the first medium format camera to include automatic exposure bracketing; demand for this feature was so great that it led to a five-month lead time. The 6008 SRC 1000 was introduced in 1992, which made exposures of 1/1000 second possible for the first time. The 6008 Integral followed in 1995, then came the 6008 AF with auto-focus, and finally the 6008i2 – a stripped-down version of the AF. The introduction of the scan-back (an attachment that digitally scanned the image, line by line) launched Rollei into the professional digital imaging market as early as 1991, and with great success.

The latest camera from the company (named Franke & Heidecke since 2006) is the Hy6, which was designed by Jenoptik and marketed in collaboration with Sinar and Leaf. This camera is a completely new, hybrid design with both analogue and digital capability. Three different versions are available from Franke & Heidecke, Sinar and Leaf (Afi) respectively. Older lenses from the 6000 series can still be used, although the viewfinder and magazine mounts are new. The motor drive within the film back eliminates the need for a mechanical link between the camera and the film magazine.

=== 2004 to 2015 – New Franke & Heidecke / RCP-Technik / DHW era / DW Photo ===
==== Break up ====
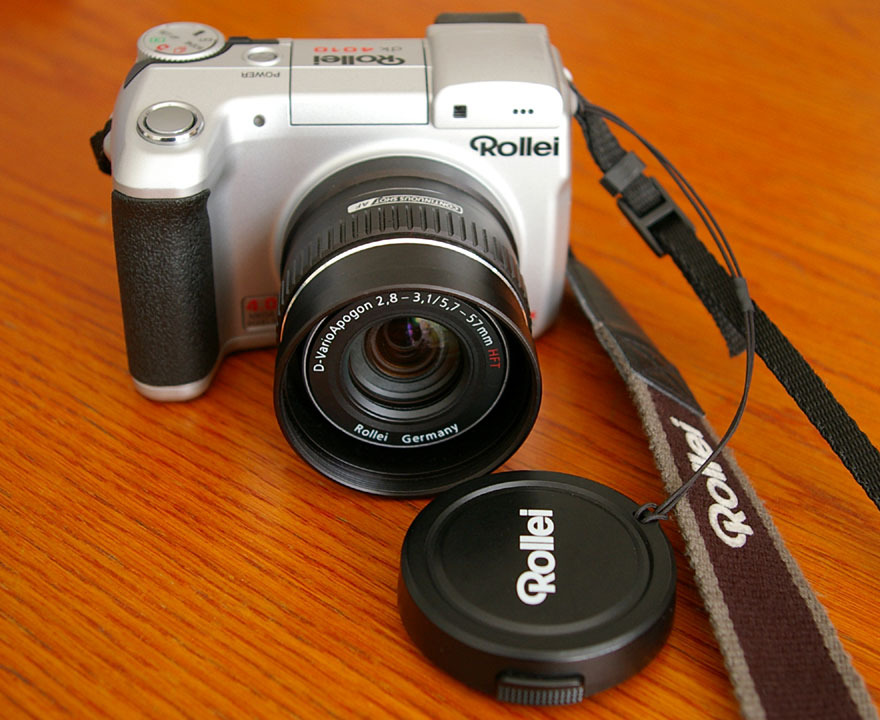
Rollei dk4010

In 2004, Rollei Fototechnic GmbH hived off its manufacturing to Rollei Produktion GmbH. In September 2005, Rollei Produktion GmbH changed its name to Franke & Heidecke GmbH; among its shareholders were Kai Franke and Rainer Heidecke, both nephews of the original founders. Once again, Franke & Heidecke was manufacturing medium format cameras, projectors, photo-technical accessories and lenses on the old company site in Salzdahlumer Straße in Braunschweig. On 27 February 2009, Franke & Heidecke filed for bankruptcy, resulting in all 131 employees being made redundant on 30 June 2009. Some of the bankruptcy assets were purchased by DHW Fototechnik GmbH with a view to partially resuming production.

In the meantime, Rollei Fototechnic GmbH changed its name to Rollei GmbH and was selling Asian-made digital cameras and consumer electronics such as MP3 players and digital video recorders. In 2006, Rollei GmbH closed its consumer products division.

In 2007/2008, what remained of Rollei GmbH (the photogrammetry and custom products divisions) merged with the Danish company Phase One to form RolleiMetrics. This company continued manufacturing from its original site in Braunschweig, but was incorporated into Trimble Holdings GmbH (Raunheim) as their Metric Imaging Department in 2009.

Rollei GmbH continued to manage Rollei's rights and licences from its headquarters in Berlin until early 2010.

One of the licensees of the Rollei brand is Hans O. Mahn & Co. KG (Maco Photo Products), who manufactures photographic film under the Rollei label.

==== New owners ====
Hamburg-based RCP-Technik GmbH & Co. KG, which has been selling Rollei-branded consumer products since 2007 under the terms of a Europe-wide licensing agreement, purchased the Rollei brand on 1 January 2010, thereby extending its rights to the brand world-wide.

Rollei's product portfolio within RCP-Technik included compact digital cameras (Compactline, Flexline, Powerflex, Sportsline), camcorders (Movieline), digital picture frames, slide and photo scanners, as well as tripods (FotoPro).

Rollei's latest products are currently available in Switzerland, Austria, Italy, France, Portugal, Great Britain, Greece, Sweden, Denmark and the Netherlands. RCP-Technik GmbH established its first subsidiary in Budapest, Hungary on 1 March 2010. Soon thereafter, it opened its second subsidiary in Istanbul, Turkey on 1 April 2010.

On 1 January 2015, RCP-Technik GmbH refirmed as Rollei GmbH & Co. KG.

==== DHW ====
DHW Fototechnik (founded in 2009 by Rolf Daus, Katherina and Hans Hartje and Frank Will) in Braunschweig was an exhibitor at photokina 2010 where it showed the Rolleiflex Hy6, a hybrid digital back-compatible and 4.5×6 / 6×6 film medium format camera, with integrated TTL-metering and an HFT PQS AF-Xenotar f/2.8, 80 mm standard lens, (Note: Compatible with all Schneider Digital AFD and Rolleiflex 6008 PQ/PQS lenses from Carl Zeiss und Schneider-Kreuznach.) the twin-lens TLR and the Rollei 35.

At photokina 2012, DHW exhibited the revised Rolleiflex Hy6 mod2, a revised Rolleiflex FX-N TLR, and the DHW Electronic Shutter No. 0 HS1000, which was based on the former Rollei Electronic Shutter. The Rolleiflex 6008 AF and Rolleiflex 6008 integral 2, the X-Act_{2} camera, the Rollei 35, and the Rolleivision projectors were continued to be sold as well.

In 2014, DHW filed for insolvency and was dissolved in April 2015.

==== DW Photo ====
After DHW's insolvency and asset sales, the same management team started the business again with a further reduced number of employees under the name DW Photo. The manufacturing of TLRs and projectors has been dropped to concentrate on the Hy6 system.

== Product overview ==
=== Medium format ===
- Rolleiflex 3.5 F TLR with 75 mm f/3.5 Planar — as used by David Bailey and Diane Arbus.
- Rolleiflex 2.8 GX — as used by Helmut Newton
- Rolleiflex 2.8 FX-N latest version of the classic TLR
- Rolleiflex SL66 and SL66E SLR with rise and fall lens plane and exceptional close-up abilities — as used by Brett Weston.
- Rolleicord Vb — A medium format twin-lens reflex camera designed for non-professional users, like the rest of the Rolleicord line.
- Rollei 4.0 FW TLR with 50 mm f/4 Super-Angulon — classic reissue.
- Rollei 4.0 FT TLR with 135 mm f/4 Tele-Xenar — classic reissue.

==== System 6000 ====
Models of the Rolleiflex 6000 series
Model	Period produced	Description
Rolleiflex SLX ("old face")	1974/1976–1979	forerunner to the System 6000
Rolleiflex SLX ("new face")	1978–1984/1985	improved electronics
Rolleiflex SLX metric	1981–1984	special version with Réseau plate for photogrammetry
Rolleiflex 6002	1984–1990 or 1985/1986–1991	without interchangeable back or TTL metering
Rolleiflex 6006	1983/1984–1986/1989	with interchangeable back and TTL metering
Rolleiflex 6006 metric	1984–1999	special version of 6006 with Réseau plate for photogrammetry, variants with 8 or 121 crosses exist
Rolleiflex 6006 mod2	1987–1988 or 1989–1993	multiple exposures (bracketing)
Rolleiflex 6008 professional	1988–1992	open-aperture metering, spot metering, hand-grip, viewfinder information
Rolleiflex 6008 LR professional	?	special version of 6008 professional with long-film magazine
Rolleiflex 6008 metric	?	special version of 6008 professional with Réseau plate for photogrammetry, variants with 9 or 121 crosses exist
Rolleiflex 6008 professional SRC 1000	1992–1995 or 1994–1996?	with PQS lenses up to 1/1000 second, ScanPack interface (SRC)
Rolleiflex 6008 ChipPack metric	?	with PQS lenses up to 1/1000 second, special version with Réseau plate for photogrammetry
Rolleiflex professional SRC 1000 "Gold Edition"	1994	Gold-plated model of Rolleiflex 6008 professional SRC 1000
Rolleiflex 6003 professional	1994– or 1996–2003?	improved electronics, faster motor-drive; like 6008, but without an exchangeable back
Rolleiflex 6003 SRC 1000	1994–1996	like 6003 professional, with PQS lenses up to 1/1000 second
Rolleiflex 6008 integral	1995–2002	integral and spot metering, master control
Rolleiflex 6008 E	1997–?	no handgrip, no high definition screen
Rolleiflex 6001 professional	1998–?	studio model without exposure meter
Rolleiflex 6008 AF	2002–2014	autofocus
Rolleiflex 6008 integral 2 (6008/2 integral) (#56650)	2003–2014	electronics from the 6008 AF, but without auto-focus
Franke & Heidecke / dhw Rolleiflex Hy6 (#58600)	2006/2007–2013	a hybrid optimised for both digital and analogue photography, with auto-focus
X-Act_{1}	1999–?	professional view camera with wide-angle bellows, fixed rear standard
X-Act_{2}	1998–2015	professional view camera
dhw Rolleiflex Hy6 mod2	2012–2015	firmware and design improvements
dw Hy6 mod2	2015–present	only sales and service - no further improvement, but some new accessories, such as a remote control with a 3 m-long wire

=== 135 film format ===
- Rollei 35 – compact original viewfinder (Germany) with Carl Zeiss Tessar 3.5/40 lens.
- Rollei 35 T – identical to original Rollei 35, 'T' suffix added after the introduction of Rollei 35 S.
- Rollei 35 S – compact camera (Singapore) with Zeiss Sonnar 2.8/40 made by Rollei.
- Rollei 35 TE / SE – Updated exposure meter with LED indication in the viewfinder, uses 5.6V PX27 battery, Zeiss Tessar 3.5/40 made by Rollei (TE), Zeiss Sonnar 2.8/40 made by Rollei (SE).
- Rollei B 35 – compact viewfinder camera with built-in selenium meter and collapsible Zeiss Triotar 3.5/40 lens.
- Rollei C 35 – Similar to Rollei B 35 but lacks an exposure meter, Zeiss Triotar 3.5/40 lens.
- Rollei 35 LED – Updated budget variant with LED exposure indication in the viewfinder, uses 5.6V PX27 battery, Zeiss Triotar 3.5/40 lens.
- Rolleimatic – compact camera with unique film transport mechanism.
- Rolleiflex SL35 series – 35 mm SLRs produced from 1970 until the late 1980s, using Carl Zeiss optics. Other lenses, like the Schneider, and the Rolleinar (manufactured for Rollei mainly by Mamiya) were also available.
- Rolleiflex SL2000F (SL3001, SL3003) – unique 35 mm system SLRs with interchangeable magazines, Carl Zeiss lenses, both waist level & eye level finders, and motorized film advance. The SL2000 F was introduced in 1981.

=== 126 film format ===
- Rollei A 26 – compact viewfinder camera for 126 film, Zeiss Sonnar 3.5/40 lens, program auto-exposure.
- Rolleiflex SL26 – manual SLR camera for 126 film with interchangeable lens, kit lens: Zeiss Tessar 2.8/40, optional lens: Zeiss Pro-Tessar 3.2/28 and Zeiss Pro-Tessar 4/80.

=== Rollei subminiature cameras ===
- Rollei 16, Rollei 16 S – manual 16mm viewfinder camera with Carl Zeiss Tessar 2.8/25 lens.
- Rollei A 110 – compact viewfinder camera for 110 film with Carl Zeiss Tessar 2.8/23 lens and program auto-exposure.
- Rollei E 110 – budget version of A 110 with aperture priority auto-exposure.
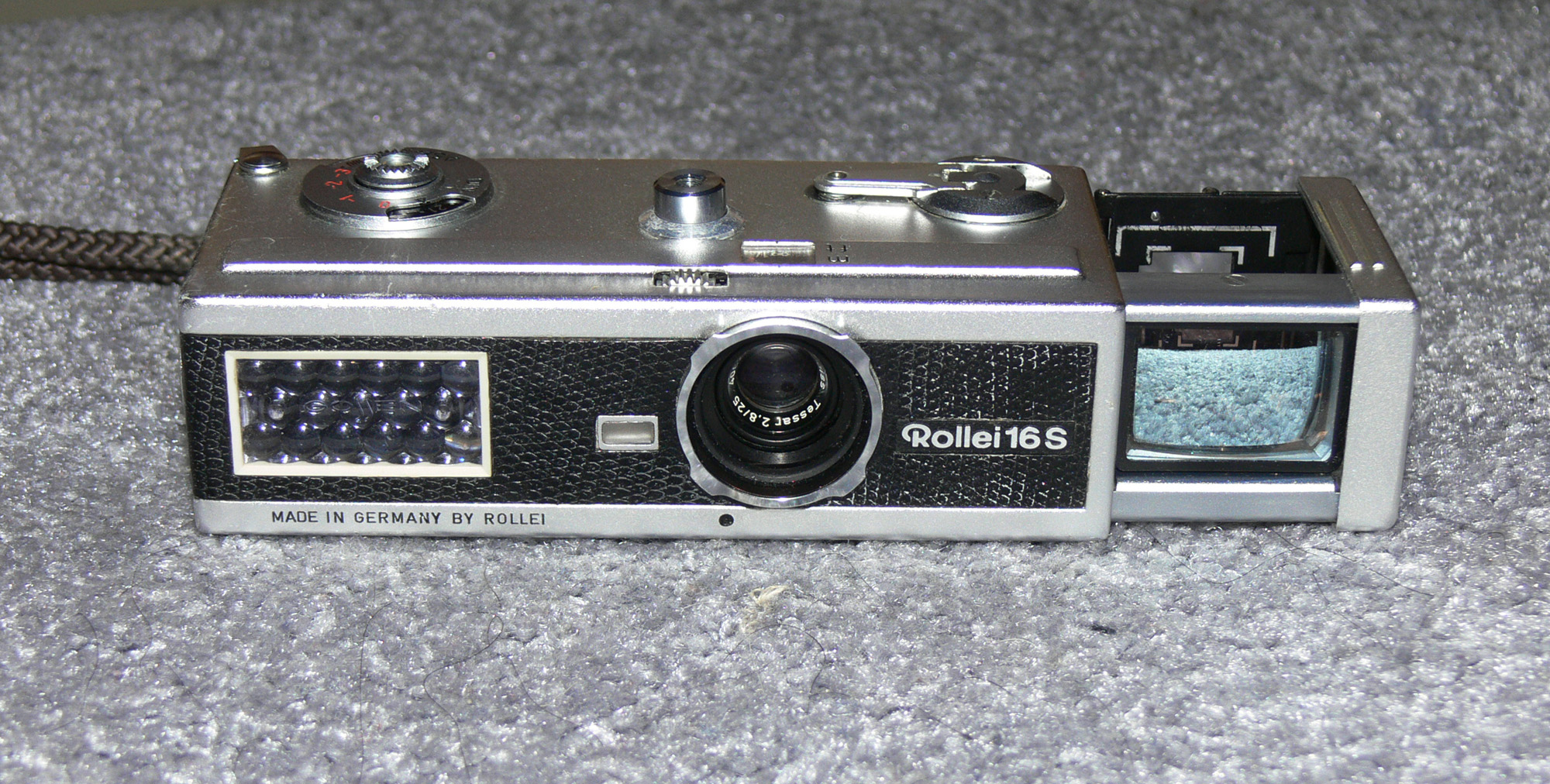
Snake skin Rollei 16 S subminiature camera

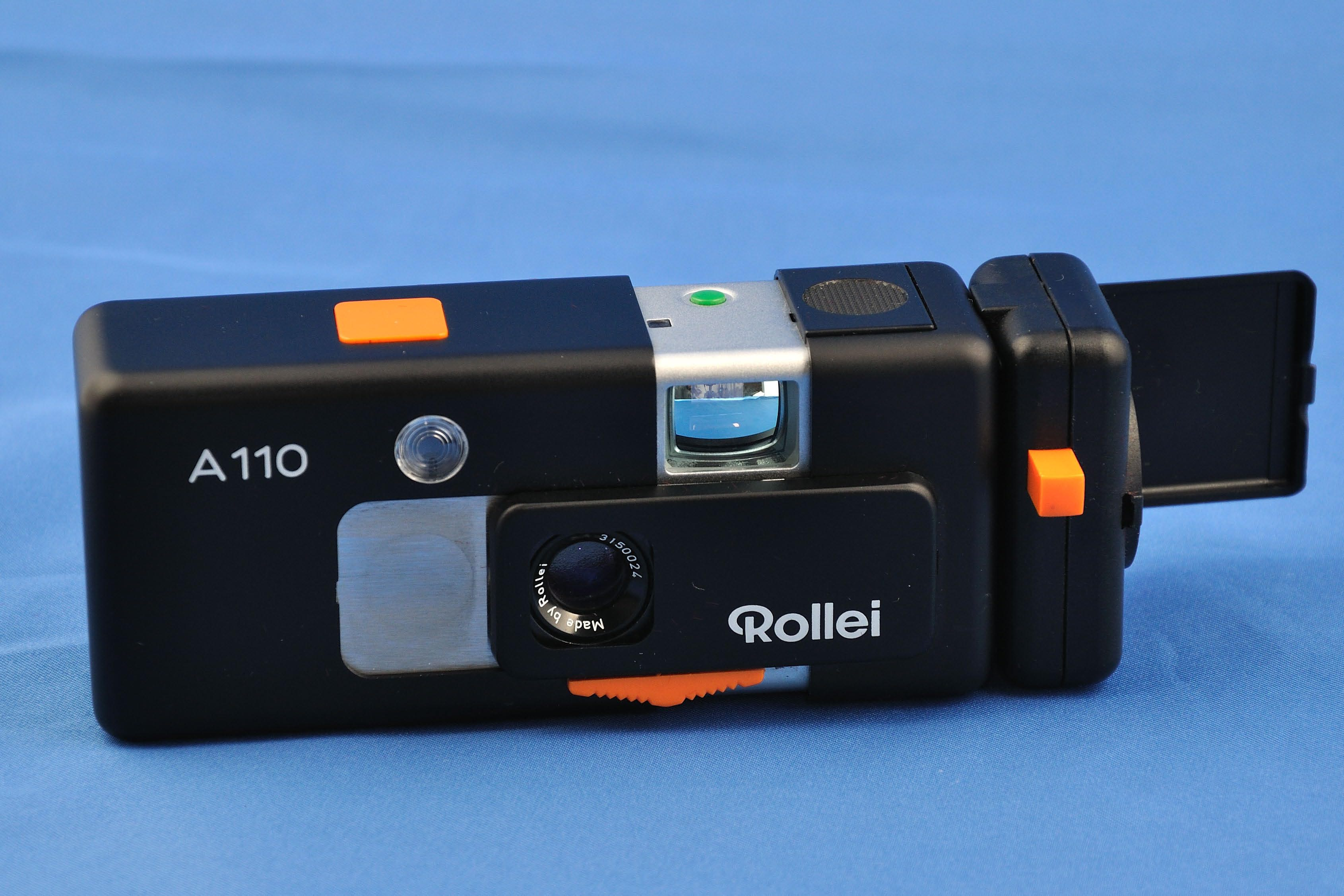
Rollei A 110

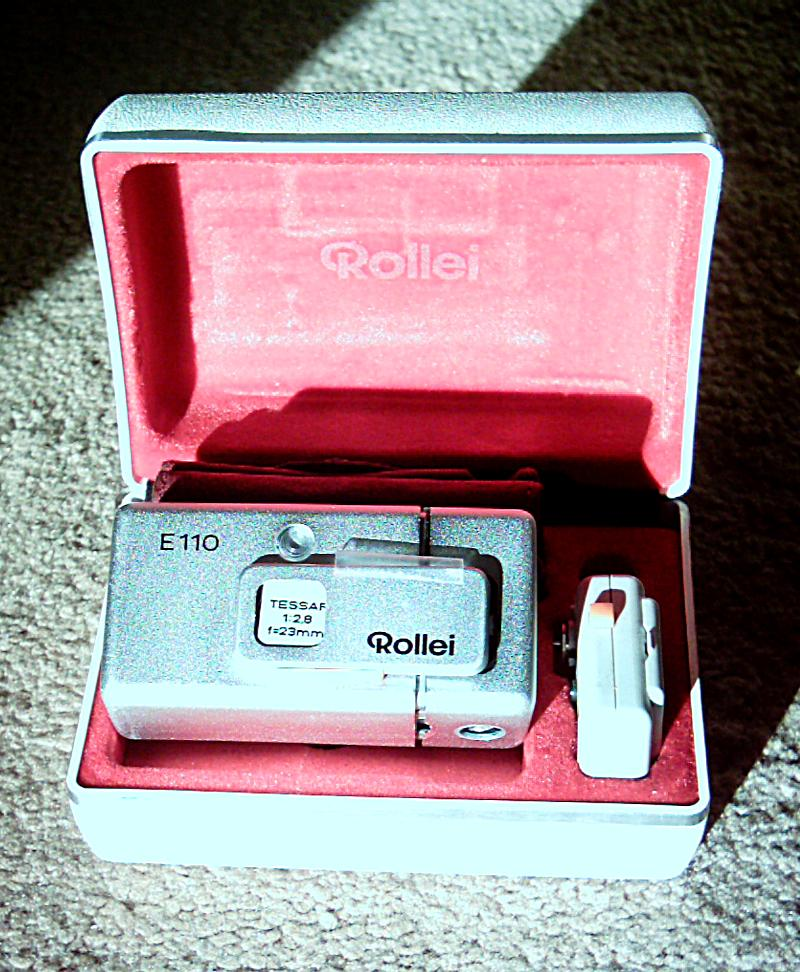
Silver color Rollei E 110 with Carl Zeiss Tessar 23 mm f/2.8 lens

=== Movie cameras ===
Models of Rollei Super 8 cameras
Model	Production	Description
Rollei SL 81	1970-1972	Schneider-Kreuznach Cinevar 1.8/10.5-32 mm lens, 3× zoom, 18 fps and single frame, no sound, built-in 85A filter, automatic exposure without AE lock, auto film speed for ASA 25/40 and 100/160 (daylight/tungsten), powered by three AA batteries, produced by Bauer in Germany.
Rollei SL 82	1970-1974	Schneider-Kreuznach Cinevar 1.8/9-36 mm lens, 4× zoom, 18, 24 fps and single frame, no sound, built-in 85A filter, automatic exposure with AE lock, auto film speed for ASA 25/40 and 100/160 (daylight/tungsten), powered by three AA batteries, produced by Bauer in Germany.
Rollei SL 83	1971-1974	Schneider-Kreuznach Neovaron 1.8/7.5-60 mm lens, 8× zoom, 18, 24, 54 fps and single frame, no sound, built-in 85A filter, automatic and manual exposure, auto film speed for ASA 16/25 and 100/160 (daylight/tungsten), powered by six AA batteries, produced by Bauer in Germany.
Rollei SL 84	1971-1974	Schneider-Kreuznach Neovaron 1.8/7-70 mm lens, 10× zoom, 18, 24, 54 fps and single frame, sound recording with synchronized tape recorder, built-in 85A filter, automatic and manual exposure, auto film speed for ASA 16/25 and 100/160 (daylight/tungsten), powered by six AA batteries, produced by Bauer in Germany.
Rollei SL 85	1971-1974	Rollei Vario 1.8/8-48 mm lens, 6× zoom, 12, 18, 32 fps and single frame, no sound, built-in 85A filter, automatic exposure, auto film speed for ASA 25/40 and 100/160 (daylight/tungsten), powered by three AA batteries, produced by Bauer in Germany.
Rollei SL 86	1972-1974	Rollei Vario 1.8/12-30 mm lens, 2.5× zoom, 18 fps and single frame, no sound, built-in 85A filter, automatic exposure, auto film speed for ASA 25/40 and 100/160 (daylight/tungsten), powered by two AA batteries, produced by Bauer in Germany.
Rollei Movie 4	1975-1977	Rollei Macro Vario 1.7/8-32 mm lens, 4× zoom, 18, 36 fps and single frame, no sound, built-in 85A filter, automatic and manual exposure, auto film speed for ASA 16/25, 25/40, 40/64, 64/100, 100/160 and 160/250 (daylight/tungsten), powered by four AA batteries, produced by Chinon in Japan.
Rollei Movie 6	1975-1977	Rollei Macro Vario 1.7/8-48 mm lens, 6× zoom, 18, 24, 48 fps and single frame, no sound, built-in 85A filter, automatic and manual exposure, auto film speed for ASA 16/25, 25/40, 40/64, 64/100, 100/160 and 160/250 (daylight/tungsten), powered by four AA batteries, produced by Chinon in Japan.
Rollei Movie 8	1975-1977	Rollei Macro Vario 1.7/7.5-60 mm lens, 8× zoom, 18, 24, 48 fps and single frame, no sound, built-in 85A filter, automatic and manual exposure, auto film speed for ASA 16/25, 25/40, 40/64, 64/100, 100/160 and 160/250 (daylight/tungsten), powered by four AA batteries, produced by Chinon in Japan.
Rollei Movie Sound XL 8 macro	1978-1979	Schneider-Kreuznach Macro Variogon 1.4/7-56 mm lens, 8× zoom, 18, 24, 48 fps and single frame, magnetic sound track support (18 and 24 fps), built-in 85A filter, automatic and manual exposure, auto film speed for ASA 25/40 and 100/160 (daylight/tungsten), powered by six AA batteries, made by Rollei in Germany.
Rollei Movie Sound XL 12 macro	1975-1977	Schneider-Kreuznach Macro Variogon 1.4/6-70 mm lens, 11.7× zoom, 18, 24, 48 fps and single frame, magnetic sound track support (18 and 24 fps), built-in 85A filter, automatic and manual exposure, auto film speed for ASA 25/40 and 100/160 (daylight/tungsten), powered by six AA batteries, made by Rollei in Germany.

=== Digital ===
- Rollei Prego series – a line of 18 consumer digital cameras with resolutions up to 10.1 megapixels (as of September 2007) marketed by Rollei GmbH.

=== Electronic flash units ===
Early non-computer units were sold as Strobofix. Early computer-controlled units were sold as Strobomatic, later units have 'C' in the name. Strobofix/Strobomatic naming was dropped around 1970. Flash units which use replaceable AA-sized batteries have 'B' in the name. Units which use "Rational Energy" computer technology have 'RE' in the name.

Models of Rollei consumer flash units
Model	Production	Description
Rollei Strobofix E20, Rollei E17 / E17 C	1968-1969, 1969-1972	Classic style flash, built-in battery, charger type A, GN 17 m at ISO 50/18°.
Rollei Strobofix E50, Rollei E22 / E22 C	1968-1969, 1969-1973	Classic style flash, built-in battery, charger type B, GN 22 m at ISO 50/18°.
Rollei Strobomatic E55, Rollei E27 / E27 C	1968-1969, 1969-1974	Classic style flash, built-in battery, charger type B, GN 27 m at ISO 50/18°.
Rollei E19 / E19 C	1971-1973	Classic style flash, built-in battery, charger type A, GN 19 m at ISO 50/18°.
Rollei E24 / E24 C	1973-1974	Classic style flash, built-in battery, charger type B, GN 24 m at ISO 50/18°.
Rollei E15	?	Compact plastic flash, built-in battery, charger type A, GN 15 m at ISO 50/18°.
Rollei E15 B	1971-1978	Same as E15 but uses two AA batteries.
Rollei E19 BC	1971-1975	Compact plastic computer flash, uses four AA batteries, GN 19 m at ISO 50/18°.
Rollei E20 / E20 C	?	Compact plastic flash, built-in battery, charger type A, GN 20 m at ISO 50/18°.
Rollei 121 BC	1973-1980	Compact plastic computer flash, uses two AA batteries, GN 15 m at ISO 50/18°.
Rollei 128 BC	1973-1978	Compact plastic computer flash, uses four AA or NiCd batteries, GN 20 m at ISO 50/18°.
Rollei 134 REB	1973-1979	Computer flash with tilting head, uses four AA or NiCd batteries, GN 34 m at ISO 100/21°.
Rollei 134 B	1973-1976	Same as 134 REB but without computer control.
Rollei 100 XL / 100 XLC	1976-1980	Compact flash, uses two AA batteries, GN 10 m at ISO 50/18°.
Rollei C 26	1972-1976	Special flash for Rollei A 26, computer controlled unit with built-in battery, charger type D.
Rollei Beta 1 / Beta 2	1979-1981	Produced by Sankyo in Japan, uses two AA batteries, GN 18 m at ISO 100/21°, Beta 2 is a variant of Beta 1 with computer control.
Rollei Beta 3	1979-1981	Produced by Sankyo in Japan, computer flash, uses two AA batteries, GN 22 m at ISO 100/21°.
Rollei Beta 4	1981	Produced by Sankyo in Japan, computer flash with 3 f-stop combinations, uses two AA batteries, GN 24 m at ISO 100/21°.
Rollei 20 REB	1990's	Special flash unit delivered with the Rollei 35 Classic cameras, uses two AA batteries, GN 20 m at ISO 100/21°.

Models of Rollei professional flash units
Model	Production	Description
Rollei Strobomatic E66	1967-1971	World's first computer-controlled flash, removable NiCd battery.
Rollei Strobofix E60	1967-1971	Same as E66 but without computer control.
Rollei E34 C	1970-1972	Second generation computer flash, removable NiCd battery, charger type C.
Rollei E36 RE	1973-1981	Computer flash, offers 3 f-stop combinations for a given film speed in computer mode, removable NiCd battery, charger type C.
Rollei 140 RES	1973-1980	More consumer-oriented computer flash, built-in battery, charger type E.
Rollei 140 S	1973-1975	Same as 140 RES but without computer control.
Rollei Beta 5 / Beta 5F	1981	Made by Rollei, 8 f-stop computer flash with optional external power and sensor, uses four AA or NiCd batteries, GN 34 m at ISO 100/21°, Beta 5F is a special model for SL2000 F / 3001 / 3003 cameras.
Rollei Beta 6	1981	Made by Rollei, 8 f-stop computer flash with a grip which attaches to flash bracket and optional external power and sensor, uses four NiCd batteries, GN 40 m at ISO 100/21°.

=== Projectors ===
==== Slide projectors for 5×5 cm frames (35 mm slides) ====
- Rollei Rolleiscop (P18.0) (1965-1966)
- Rollei P35 (1968)
- Rollei P35A (1968), also sold as Voigtländer VP135A
- Rollei P35 autofocus (P35E), also sold as Voigtländer VP135AF
- Rollei P37A (1972)
- Rollei P37 autofocus (P37E)
- Rollei P350A (1974)
- Rollei P350AT
- Rollei P350 autofocus (P350AF)
- Rollei P360 automat (P360A) (1978), also sold as Voigtländer VP300A
- Rollei P360 autofocus (P360AF), also sold as Voigtländer VP300AF
- Rollei P360 autofocus IR (P360AF/IR)
- Rollei P3800 (1976)
- Rollei P 300, P 320, P 340, Diamat S (PM35A)
- Rollei P 300 autofocus, P 320 autofocus, P 340 autofocus, Diamat SE autofocus (PM35AF)
- Rollei P 1000
- Rollei P 2000
- Rollei P 305 automat
- Rollei P 305 autofocus / Rollei P 325 autofocus
- Rollei P 326 automat
- Rollei P 355 automat / Rollei P 355 autofocus
- Rollei P 801 / Rollei P 801S autofocus (1982)
- Rollei P 1150 A automat
- Rollei P 1250 AF autofocus
- Rollei P 3801 / Rollei P 3801 IR / Rollei P 3801 Stereo
- Rollei 35 twin (1984-1988) / Rollei 35 twin IR (1985)
- Rollei Rolleivision 35 twin digital (1989-1995) / Rolleivision 35 twin digital P (1991-1995)
- Rollei Rolleivision twin MSC 300 / Rolleivision twin MSC 300 P (1993)
- Rollei Rolleivision twin MSC 310
- Rollei Rolleivision twin MSC 315
- Rollei Rolleivision twin MSC 320 S
- Rollei Rolleivision twin MSC 330 P
- Rollei / Franke & Heidecke / DHW Rolleivision twin MSC 325 P (-2015)
- Rollei / Franke & Heidecke / DHW Rolleivision twin MSC 535 P (2004-2015)

==== Slide projectors for 7×7 cm frames (6×6 cm slides) ====
- Rollei Universal (P11.0) (1960-1978)
- Rollei Projection Attachment (P95.0) (1964-1965); utilizes a Rollei TLR camera as projection lens
- Rollei P66A (1978)
- Rollei P66 autofocus (P66E)
- Rollei P66S autofocus
- Rollei Rolleivision 66 / Rolleivision 66 AV (1986)
- Rollei / Franke & Heidecke / DHW Rolleivision 66 dual P (-2015)

==== Movie projectors for 8 mm film ====
Model	Production	Description
Rollei P8S	1968-1969	Super 8, forward and reverse projection, 18 fps, automatic threading, no sound, produced by Bauer in Germany.
Rollei P8SN	1968-1969	Normal 8 and Super 8, forward and reverse projection, 9 and 18 fps, automatic threading, no sound, produced by Bauer in Germany.
Rollei P83	1969-1970	Normal 8 and Super 8, forward and reverse projection, 18 fps with variable speed, automatic threading, no sound, produced by Silma in Italy.
Rollei P84T	1971-1972	Super 8, forward and reverse projection, 18 and 24 fps, automatic threading, magnetic mono sound track with recording ability, produced by Bauer in Germany.
Rollei Movie P830	1975-1976	Normal 8 and Super 8, forward and reverse projection, 8-12 and 18-24 fps with variable speed, automatic threading, no sound, produced by Silma in Italy.
Rollei Movie P840T	1975-1976	Normal 8 and Super 8, forward and reverse projection, 18 and 24 fps, automatic threading, magnetic mono sound track with recording ability, produced by Silma in Italy.
Rollei P8400S	1977-1978	Super 8, forward and reverse projection, 18 and 24 fps, automatic threading, magnetic mono sound track with recording ability, produced by Copal in Japan.
		Citations for above.

== See also ==
- Rolleiflex
- Rolleicord
- Rollei 35
- Rolleiflex SL35
- Medium format cameras
- Twin-lens reflex camera
- List of digital camera brands
- Maco Photo Products (Licensee of the Rollei brand for photographic films)
- Minox (Licensee of the Rolleiflex brand for miniature replica cameras)
