= List of lenses for Rolleiflex SLX/6000/Hy6 cameras =

The Rolleiflex SLX, 6000 System, and Hy6 cameras are medium format and digital single-lens reflex cameras manufactured and marketed by Rollei starting from 1976, when the Rolleiflex SLX was released. Photographic lenses for these cameras share the same mechanical lens mount interface, but differences in camera body features and controls mean that some lenses are not compatible with some camera bodies.

== Compatibility ==
The following lens types have been released:

- SLX (original): released with the SLX. These lenses were designed by Zeiss and manufactured by Zeiss or under license by Rollei; they are marked with a red HFT ("high fidelity transfer") indicating lens multicoating. However, there are some exceptions, as the Variogon zooms were designed and manufactured by Schneider Kreuznach. In general, the SLX lenses use Rollei bayonet filters.
- Rolleigon: released with the 6006. These were a less-costly line of lenses which offer the same features and compatibility as the original SLX lenses. In general, the Rolleigon lenses use threaded filters.
- PQ: released with the 6008. These support aperture-priority and program autoexposure modes for camera bodies offering those features.
- EL: "economy line". These also were a less-costly line of lenses which offered the same features and compatibility as the PQ lenses, including aperture-priority and program autoexposure modes.
- PQS: released in 1990 shortly after the 6008. These extended the shortest shutter speed to 1/1000 s, which draws more current from the camera body, breaking compatibility with older cameras.
- AF-PQ and AF-PQS: released with the 6008 AF, supporting autofocus functions.
- AFD-PQ and AFD-PQS: released with the Hy6, also supporting autofocus functions; the aperture selection control has been moved from the lens to the body, breaking compatibility with older bodies.

Lens compatibility and features (Note: All lenses offer manual and shutter-priority autoexposure modes with compatible bodies; shutter speeds range from 30 to 1/500 s, except for PQS types, which extend the range to 1/1000 s.)
Camera Lens type	SLX	6006/ 6002	6008/ 6003/ 6001	Hy6	Features Type	S (Note: Shutter-priority autoexposure)	A (Note: Aperture-priority autoexposure)	P (Note: Program autoexposure)	AF (Note: Autofocus with appropriate bodies (6008 AF, Hy6))
SLX / Rolleigon (Note: SLX lens types include the original Zeiss-designed lenses released with the SLX as well as the Rolleigon economy line.)	Yes	Yes	S/M (Note: Limited by lens to shutter and manual exposure modes.)	No	SLX / Rolleigon	Yes	No	No	No
PQ (Note: "Professional Quality") / EL (Note: "Economy Line"; features same as PQ)	S/M (Note: Limited by camera body to shutter and manual exposure modes.)	S/M	Yes	MF (Note: Manual focus only)	PQ / EL	Yes	Yes	Yes	No
PQS (Note: "Professional Quality Super Fast")	No	No	Yes	MF	PQS	Yes	Yes	Yes	No
AF-PQ	No	MF	Yes (Note: Autofocus with 6008 AF; manual focus with other bodies)	Yes	AF-PQ	Yes	Yes	Yes	Yes
AF-PQS	No	No	Yes	Yes	AF-PQS	Yes	Yes	Yes	Yes
AFD-PQ/PQS	No	No	No	Yes	AFD-PQ/PQS	Yes	Yes	Yes	Yes

== List of lenses ==
Interchangeable lenses for Rolleiflex SLX, 6000 series, and Hy6 cameras
FL (mm)	Apr.	Name	Type	Construction		Min. Focus	Dimensions			Notes
FL (mm)	Apr.	Name	Type	Ele	Grp	Min. Focus	Φ×L	Wgt.	Filter	Notes
Fisheye lenses
30	f/3.5–22	F-Distagon HFT	PQ	8	7	0.30 m (1 ft 0 in)	108×122 mm (4.3×4.8 in)	1,550 g (55 oz)	24	Built-in filter attaches to rear of front group
Ultra wide angle lenses
35	f/3.5–22	AF Flektogon HFT	AF-PQ	10	8	0.50 m (1 ft 8 in)	104×105 mm (4.1×4.1 in)	1,300 g (46 oz)	104B	
40	f/3.5–22	Super-Angulon (Note: Floating lens elements)	PQ	8	8	0.40 m (1 ft 4 in)	83.2×72 mm (3.3×2.8 in)	750 g (26 oz)	77	
40	f/4–32	Distagon HFT	SLX	10	9	0.50 m (1 ft 8 in)	102×126 mm (4.0×5.0 in)	1,450 g (51 oz)	Bay VIII	
40	f/4–32	Distagon HFT (FLE)	PQ	11	10	0.50 m (1 ft 8 in)	83×90 mm (3.3×3.5 in)	1,040 g (37 oz)	95	
Wide angle lenses
50	f/2.8–22	Super-Angulon HFT	PQS	9	8	0.60 m (2 ft 0 in)	104×115 mm (4.1×4.5 in)	1,600 g (56 oz)	95	
50	f/2.8–22	AF/AFD Super-Angulon	AF-PQS, AFD-PQS	9	8	0.60 m (2 ft 0 in)	104×115 mm (4.1×4.5 in)	1,500 g (53 oz)	95	
50	f/4–32	Distagon HFT	SLX, PQ	7	7	0.50 m (1 ft 8 in)	81.5×96 mm (3.2×3.8 in)	840 g (30 oz)	Bay VI	
50	f/4–32	Rolleigon HFT	Rolleigon	8	8	0.50 m (1 ft 8 in)	88×86 mm (3.5×3.4 in)	715 g (25.2 oz)	77	
50	f/4–32	Distagon HFT	EL	7	7	0.50 m (1 ft 8 in)	81.5×96 mm (3.2×3.8 in)	840 g (30 oz)	67	
50	f/4–32	Distagon HFT (FLE)	PQ	9	8	0.50 m (1 ft 8 in)	82×95 mm (3.2×3.7 in)	880 g (31 oz)	Bay VI	
55	f/4.5–32	PCS Super Angulon	SLX, PQ	10	8	0.50 m (1 ft 8 in)	104×157 mm (4.1×6.2 in)	1,650 g (58 oz)	104B	Perspective control lens
60	f/3.5–22	Distagon HFT	SLX, PQ	7	7	0.60 m (2 ft 0 in)	81×83 mm (3.2×3.3 in)	770 g (27 oz)	Bay VI	
Normal lenses
80	f/2–16	Xenotar HFT	PQ	7	5	0.80 m (2 ft 7 in)	97.3×99.7 mm (3.8×3.9 in)	960 g (34 oz)	Bay VI	
80	f/2.8–22	Planar HFT	SLX, PQ, PQS	7	5	0.90 m (2 ft 11 in)	81.5×63 mm (3.2×2.5 in)	590 g (21 oz)	Bay VI	
80	f/2.8–22	Planar HFT	EL	7	5	0.90 m (2 ft 11 in)	81.5×63 mm (3.2×2.5 in)	590 g (21 oz)	67	
80	f/2.8–22	Rolleigon HFT	Rolleigon	6	5	0.90 m (2 ft 11 in)	82.5×63 mm (3.2×2.5 in)	570 g (20 oz)	67	
80	f/2.8–22	Xenotar	PQS	7	6	0.80 m (2 ft 7 in)	84.5×66.5 mm (3.3×2.6 in)	520 g (18 oz)	Bay VI	
80	f/2.8–22	AF/AFD Xenotar	AF-PQS, AFD-PQS	7	6	0.80 m (2 ft 7 in)	84.5×66.5 mm (3.3×2.6 in)	520 g (18 oz)	Bay VI	
90	f/4–32	Apo-Symmar Macro HFT	PQS	6	4	0.40 m (1 ft 4 in)	104×110 mm (4.1×4.3 in)	860 g (30 oz)	95	
Portrait lenses
110	f/2–16	Planar HFT	PQ	7	6	0.80 m (2 ft 7 in)	104×95 mm (4.1×3.7 in)	1,295 g (45.7 oz)	95	
120	f/4–32	Makro-Planar HFT	PQ, PQS	6	4	0.80 m (2 ft 7 in)	81.5×102 mm (3.2×4.0 in)	960 g (34 oz)	Bay VI	For macro photography
120	f/5.6–45	S-Planar HFT	SLX	6	4	0.95 m (3 ft 1 in)	81.5×100 mm (3.2×3.9 in)	830 g (29 oz)	Bay VI	For macro photography
150	f/4–32	Sonnar HFT	SLX, PQ, PQS	5	3	1.40 m (4 ft 7 in)	81.5×102 mm (3.2×4.0 in)	890 g (31 oz)	Bay VI	
150	f/4–32	Rolleigon HFT	Rolleigon	5	4	1.40 m (4 ft 7 in)	82.5×99 mm (3.2×3.9 in)	760 g (27 oz)	67	
150	f/4–32	Sonnar HFT	EL	5	3	1.40 m (4 ft 7 in)	81.5×102 mm (3.2×4.0 in)	890 g (31 oz)	67	
150	f/4–32	AF/AFD Tele-Xenar	AF-PQS, AFD-PQS	5	5	1.40 m (4 ft 7 in)	95×114 mm (3.7×4.5 in)	890 g (31 oz)	Bay VI	
150	f/4.6–32	Apo-Symmar HFT Makro	PQ	5	3	1.1×	81.5×81.5 mm (3.2×3.2 in)	706 g (24.9 oz)	Bay VI	
180	f/2.8–22	Tele-Xenar	PQ	6	6	1.80 m (5 ft 11 in)	100×150 mm (3.9×5.9 in)	1,525 g (53.8 oz)	95	
180	f/2.8–22	AF/AFD Tele-Xenar	AF-PQS, AFD-PQS	7	7	1.80 m (5 ft 11 in)	100×135 mm (3.9×5.3 in)	1,480 g (52 oz)	95	
Telephoto lenses
250	f/5.6–45	Sonnar HFT	SLX	4	3	2.50 m (8 ft 2 in)	81.5×168 mm (3.2×6.6 in)	1,200 g (42 oz)	Bay VI	
250	f/5.6–45	Sonnar HFT	EL	4	3	2.50 m (8 ft 2 in)	82.5×170 mm (3.2×6.7 in)	1,150 g (41 oz)	67	
250	f/5.6–45	Sonnar HFT	PQ, PQS	4	3	2.50 m (8 ft 2 in)	82.5×170 mm (3.2×6.7 in)	1,150 g (41 oz)	Bay VI	
300	f/4–32	Apo-Tele-Xenar	PQ	6	6	3.2 m (10 ft)	101×262 mm (4.0×10.3 in)	2,000 g (71 oz)	95	
350	f/5.6–45	Tele-Tessar HFT	SLX, PQ	4	4	5.00 m (16.40 ft)	90.0×227 mm (3.5×8.9 in)	1,650 g (58 oz)	86	
500	f/8–64	Tele-Tessar HFT	SLX, PQ, EL	5	3	8.5 m (28 ft)	100×316 mm (3.9×12.4 in)	1,995 g (70.4 oz)	86	
1000	f/8–64	Tele-Tessar HFT	PQ	4	4	21 m (69 ft)	215×790 mm (8.5×31.1 in)	8.74 kg (19.3 lb)	—	
Zoom lenses
60~140	f/4.6–32	AF/AFD Variogon	AF-PQS, AFD-PQS	13	11	0.7 m (2 ft 4 in)	119×210 mm (4.7×8.3 in)	2,400 g (85 oz)	122	
75~150	f/4.5–32	Variogon	SLX, PQ	15	13	1.8 m (5 ft 11 in)	100×180 mm (3.9×7.1 in)	1,800 g (63 oz)	95	
140~280	f/5.6–45	Variogon	SLX, PQ	17	14	2.50 m (8 ft 2 in)	94×240 mm (3.7×9.4 in)	1,850 g (65 oz)	95	
