= Rolleiflex 6000 System =

SLR cameras from Rolleiflex

Rolleiflex 600x series
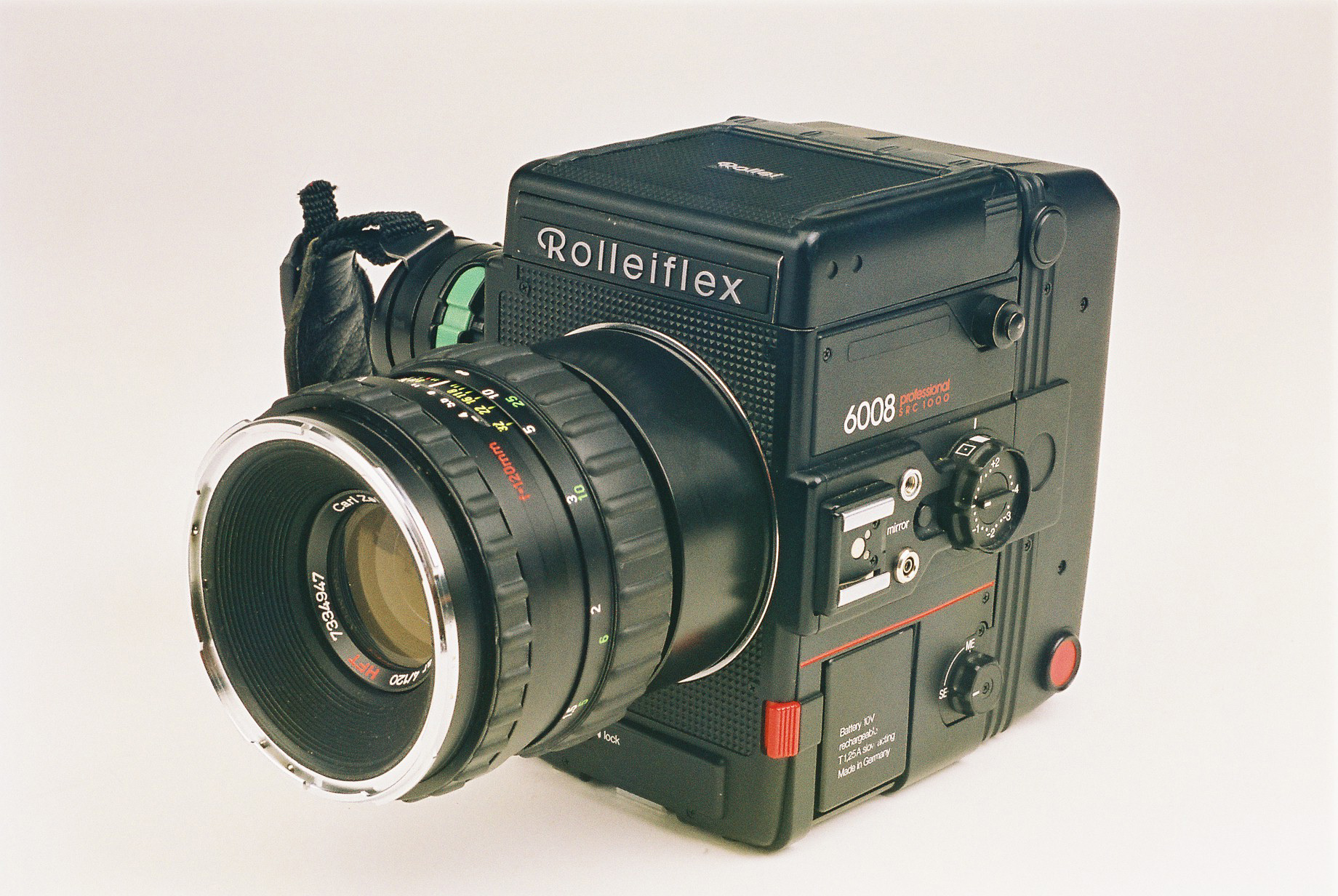
- Rolleiflex 6008 SRC 1000 professional, with Zeiss 4/120 Planar HFT lens

Overview
- Type: Medium format single-lens reflex camera

Focusing
- Focus: manual, automatic

Exposure/metering
- Exposure: TTL exposure

Flash
- Flash: hot shoe

The Rolleiflex 6000 System is a line of medium format single lens reflex cameras made by Rollei, in regular production starting from 1983 with the 6006. The 6006 was derived from the earlier SLX (1976) and retains compatibility with its lenses and accessories, adding an interchangeable film back with an integral dark slide. Like the SLX, the 6000 series cameras incorporate electronic autoexposure and motorized film transport, competing directly with the line of similar integrated-motor Hasselblad V-system cameras which started with the 500EL.

The 6006 was followed by the 6002 (1986), 6008 (1988), 6003 (1996), 6001 (1998), and 6008 AF (2002). The 6002 may be regarded as a simplified version of the 6006, or alternatively as a replacement for the SLX, with a non-interchangeable back; the 6008/6003 are positioned similarly. Rollei released numerous sub-variants of each model.

== History ==
Broadly, the 6000 System can be divided into two distinct generations: the 6006/6002, which bear some similarities to the preceding SLX, and the 6008/6003/6001, which introduced upgraded metering and shutters.

=== First generation (6006 / 6002) ===
Like the preceding SLX, the 6006 was designed to marry features from modern small format SLRs, including motorized film transport and autoexposure, with the larger film size of medium format cameras. The first camera released was the 6006 (1984), which had features similar to the SLX, adding through-the-lens (TTL) off-the-film (OTF) flash metering and a fully-interchangeable film back. The film back introduced with the 6006 had an integrated, flexible dark slide; it adds approximately 3/4 in (19 mm) to the depth of the 6006, compared to the SLX. A second version of the 6006 was released in 1989 with minor updates. Externally, the mechanical cable release socket was removed; on the original 6006, this was centered on the bottom front of the body between the two microswitch shutter releases.

The 6006 was supplemented by the 6002 (1986), which was a simplified 6006, reverting to the interchangeable film magazines of the SLX, but retaining the updated TTL/OTF light meter. In addition, the 6002 added multiple exposure capability, which subsequently was added with the updated 6006 in 1989.

=== Second generation (6008 / 6003 / 6001) ===
In 1988, Rollei released the 6008 professional, which eventually replaced the 6006. Externally, the 6008 moves the on/motor mode switch to a location coaxial with the shutter speed knob. An updated 6008 (branded 6008 professional SRC1000) was released in 1993, which added compatibility with PQS lenses; these feature an increased shutter speed of 1/1000 sec. Similar to the 6002, Rollei released the 6003 SRC1000 as a simplified companion to the 6008 in 1994. The 6003 removes the mechanical cable release socket and self timer; in addition, the default camera back takes interchangeable film inserts, but the standard back can be removed and used with 6008 film backs. The original 6008/6003 models were replaced with the 6008 integral (1995), 6003 professional (1996), and 6008 E (1997); improvements included the addition of a multi-spot metering mode and a faster motor drive.

In 1998, Rollei released the 6001 professional, which was a studio-only version of the 6003 professional, dropping the ambient light meter entirely, as it was intended to be used with flash lighting.

The final 6000 series cameras were released in 2002; the 6008 integral2 included improvements to the flash metering system, and the 6008 AF built on that by adding an autofocus system along with a new line of AF lenses.

=== X-Act ===
Rollei released the X-Act_{2} in 2008, which is a monorail view camera with a full range of rise/fall, shift, and swing movements for both the lens (front) and film (rear) standards. The front and rear standards each are fitted with a hole which is 85 mm in diameter as an adaptable interface for the lens and back; Rollei sold adapters that would accept a limited selection of 6000 System lenses, viewfinders, and backs, and additional adapters were available for backs from competing medium format systems, including Hasselblad V-system, Mamiya RB, and Horseman 6×9, or a T2 adapter for use with 135 film and digital SLRs. When using 6000 System lenses, the handheld LensControl S was used to control shutter speed and aperture.

The X-Act also was designed to accept large format lenses for maximum image coverage and movement flexibility; Rollei also sold its own leaf shutter units, branded ElectronicShutter, for use with lenses with size 0 or size 1 shutters. The ElectronicShutter units also were controlled using the LensControl S.

=== Hy6 ===
In 2007, Rollei began selling the Rolleiflex Hy6, a hybrid medium format SLR camera which accepted both analog film backs or backs with digital sensors, using the Rolleiflex SLX/6000 lens mount. The Hy6 was developed by Jenoptik and sold simultaneously by Rollei and other brands, including Leaf (as the AFi) and Sinar (as the Hy6). The 6000 System was discontinued in 2015.

Rollei 6000 series cameras
Camera	Dates		Film back	TTL meter		Motor drive
Camera	Intro.	Disc.	Film back	Measurements	Modes	Motor drive
SLX	1976	1985	Fixed	Ambient	Centre-weighted average	Max 1.5 frames/sec.
6006	1984	1989	Interchangeable	Ambient, flash	Centre-weighted average	Max 1.5 frames/sec.
6002	1986	1990	Fixed	Ambient, flash	Centre-weighted average	Max 1.5 frames/sec.
6008 professional	1988	1992	Interchangeable	Ambient, flash	Centre-weighted multi-zone, spot	Max 2 frames/sec.
6006 Mod. II	1989	1992	Interchangeable	Ambient, flash	Centre-weighted average	Max 1.5 frames/sec.
6008 professional SRC 1000	1992	1995	Interchangeable	Ambient, flash	Centre-weighted multi-zone, spot	Max 2 frames/sec.
6003 SRC 1000	1994	1996	Detachable	Ambient, flash	Centre-weighted multi-zone, spot	Max 2 frames/sec.
6008 integral	1995	2002	Interchangeable	Ambient, flash	Centre-weighted multi-zone, spot, and multi-spot	Max 2.5 frames/sec.
6003 professional	1996	2003	Detachable	Ambient, flash	Centre-weighted multi-zone, spot, and multi-spot	Max 2 frames/sec.
6008 E	1997	2000	Interchangeable	Ambient, flash	Centre-weighted multi-zone, spot, and multi-spot	Max 2.5 frames/sec.
6001	1998	?	Interchangeable	Flash	Centre-weighted multi-zone, spot, and multi-spot	Max 1.5 frames/sec.
6008 AF	2002	2015	Interchangeable	Ambient, flash	Centre-weighted multi-zone, spot, and multi-spot	Max 2 frames/sec.
6008 integral 2	2003	2015	Interchangeable	Ambient, flash	Centre-weighted multi-zone, spot, and multi-spot	Max 2 frames/sec.

== Design ==
Like the Rolleiflex TLR, SL66, and SLX, the 6000 series uses 120 or 220 rollfilm to produce frames of up to 6×6 cm (nominal); the actual image size is based on imperial units, measuring 2 1/4×2 1/4 in (57×57 mm). The camera has a modular design; the central camera body incorporates the single-lens reflex mirror and exposure controls, with interfaces accommodating interchangeable lenses, viewfinders, and focusing screens. Most of the cameras accommodate interchangeable film backs. Nearly all of the accessories and components for the SLX could be used with the 6006, aside from the back and body.

=== Basic operation ===
Like the SLX, all 6000 System cameras have manual ambient light metering and shutter-priority autoexposure capability, along with motorized film advance and shutter charging. The light meter is integrated into the camera body. The 6006 and 6002 have a centre-weighted average metering pattern; compared to the SLX, these cameras add an off-the-film sensor for TTL flash metering. The 6008 and 6003 add aperture-priority and program autoexposure modes; in addition, the metering pattern can be switched between centre-weighted multi-zone and spot, covering approximately 1% of the overall image area. A multi-spot metering pattern was added to later 6008/6003 cameras. The 6001 drops the ambient light meter entirely, but supports TTL OTF flash metering.

The main switch falls under the photographer's right hand on the 6006/6002, and has three rotary positions for "O"ff, "S"ingle, or "C"ontinuous exposures. A 14-pin interface for remote operation and a depth-of-field preview button (stop-down) are next to the main switch. For the 6008 and later cameras, the main switch and depth-of-field preview have been moved to the shutter speed knob.

The opposite side of the camera has a strap lug, hotshoe, and a slot to accommodate the rechargeable NiCd battery. Advertised stamina is approximately 500 to 600 exposures per charge.

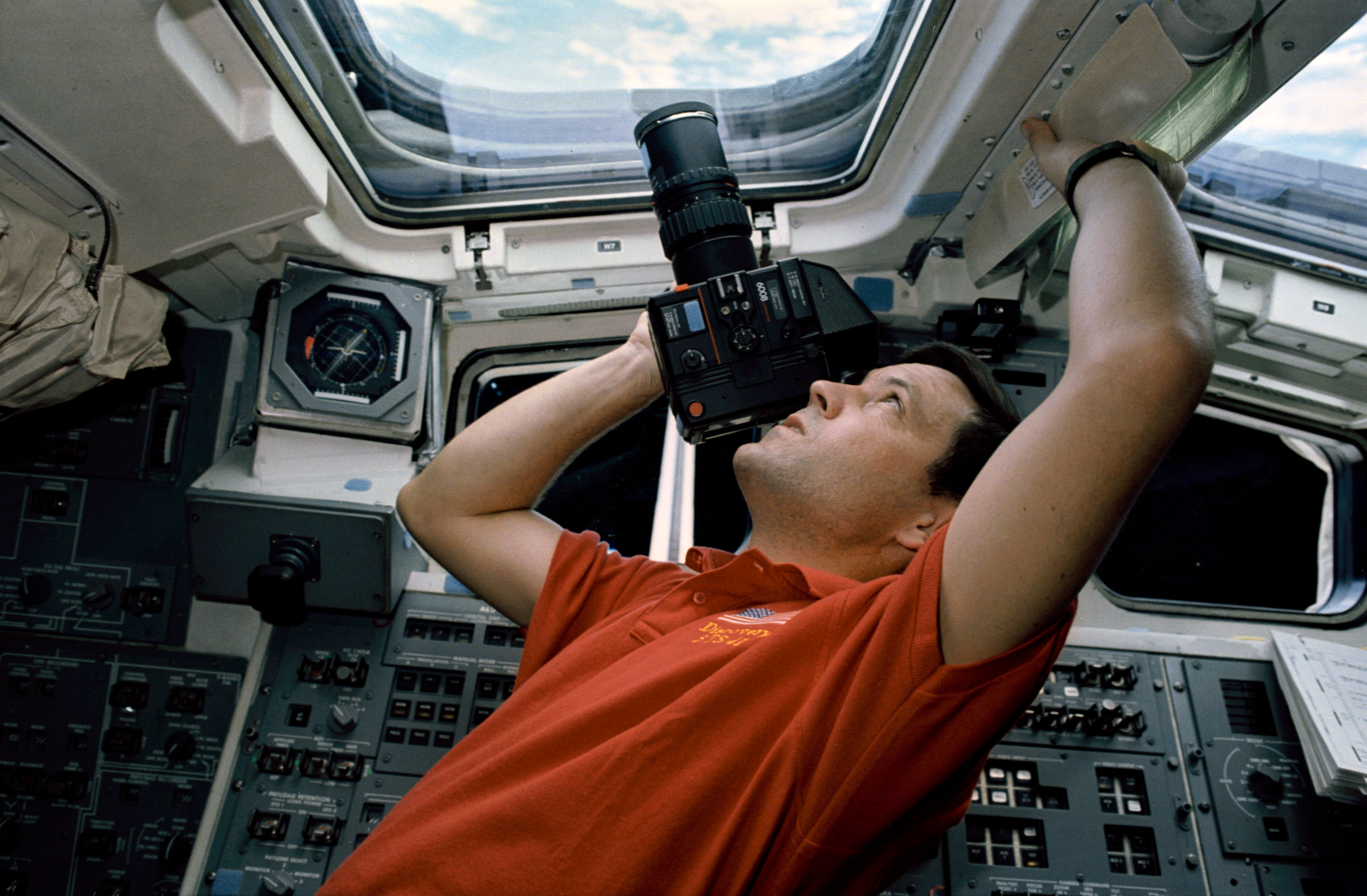
Pilot Robert D. Cabana uses a Rolleiflex 6008 professional with 90° eye-level pentaprism finder during STS-41 (1990).

Two separate electronic shutter releases are provided on the bottom front corners of the camera, which may be operated by the photographer's right or left hand. Shutter speeds are selected by a knob operated by the photographer's right hand and range from 30 to 1/500 sec in whole steps; cameras released after the PQS series add a faster 1/1000 sec speed. Since lenses are focused by helicoid extension, the traditional focusing knob on the left side of Rolleiflex SL66 and TLR cameras is not present.

=== Backs ===
The 6006 uses an interchangeable film magazine with integrated dark slide to accommodate mid-roll film changes. In addition to the standard 6×6 back, a 645 back was available; both of these took film inserts. A bulk 70 mm perforated film back and a Polaroid (packfilm) back also were available. As shipped from the factory, the 6002 was fitted with a fixed film back which used the same interchangeable film inserts as the SLX.

The 6008 continued using the same film magazine system as the 6006. The 6003 was fitted as standard with a detachable film back which accommodated the same film inserts as the 6002; the 6003 back also could be removed completely and fitted with the 6006/6008 film magazines.

The Rollei Digital ScanPack is a back with a scanning linear image sensor which was available for the 6000 System cameras. It was tethered to a computer via SCSI. The image recorded was 41.2×35 mm (1.62×1.38 in) with a maximum resolution of 5850×5000 pixels.

=== Lenses ===
The 6000 series uses lenses that are physically compatible with earlier SLX lenses. These lenses use conventional helicoids for focusing instead of the extending focusing bellows on the camera body of the SL66. In addition, SLX/6000 lenses all are equipped with in-lens leaf shutters. Because of this, SLX/6000 and SL66 lenses are not compatible.

A 10-pin interface is provided to transmit signals between the lens and camera body. The leaf shutter and aperture leaves are driven by voice coil motors, which Rollei called "linear motors". The aperture control ring on each lens has a separate setting at "A", which puts the camera into shutter-priority autoexposure.

Extension tubes and a bellows unit were available for close-up work.

=== Viewfinders and focusing screens ===
The 6000 System uses the same viewfinders as the preceding SLX; the standard viewfinder fitted has a folding waist-level finder with a built-in magnifier and a ground glass focusing screen with a central split-image rangefinder spot surrounded by a microprism collar, grid lines etched at regular intervals, and an integrated Fresnel lens. The viewfinder displays an image 55×55 mm (2.2×2.2 in), which is 93% of the area recorded on the film. The magnifying lens in the viewfinder could be changed. Other available viewfinders include:

- Rigid magnifying hood, which accommodates waist-level viewing with better shielding of the focusing screen
- Rotating pentaprism finder (45°), which provides an eyepiece at 45° from vertical, and rotates to allow viewing from the side or front
- Rotating pentaprism finder (90°), which provides a horizontal eyepiece for eye-level operation, and rotates to allow viewing from the side or front

The screen could be changed to one of several alternatives, which are shared with the SL66:

Focusing screens for Rollei 6000 System cameras
Image	Catalog	Grid	Fresnel field lens	Central focusing aid(s)	Notes
	560 060	Yes (11 mm)	Yes	Microprism (15 mm dia.)	
	560 050	Yes (11 mm)	Yes	Split-image rangefinder (5 mm dia.)	
	560 040	Yes (11 mm)	Yes	No	
	560 180	Yes (11 mm)	Yes	Microprism (15 mm dia.) and split-image rangefinder (5 mm dia.)	Standard screen
	560 030	No	No	No	
	560 100	Yes (11 mm)	Yes	Clear with crosshair and measuring graticule	

=== Remote control ===
Rollei offered the ME-1 multi-exposure control unit using the 14-pin DIN connector first released with the SLX; it allows the photographer to record up to ten images on a single frame, at a selectable interval between 0.1 and 1.5 seconds. It was supplied with a 2 m (6 ft 7 in) cable as standard, and a 10 m (33 ft) cable was available as an accessory.
