= Rolleiflex SL2000F =

Rolleiflex SL 2000 F
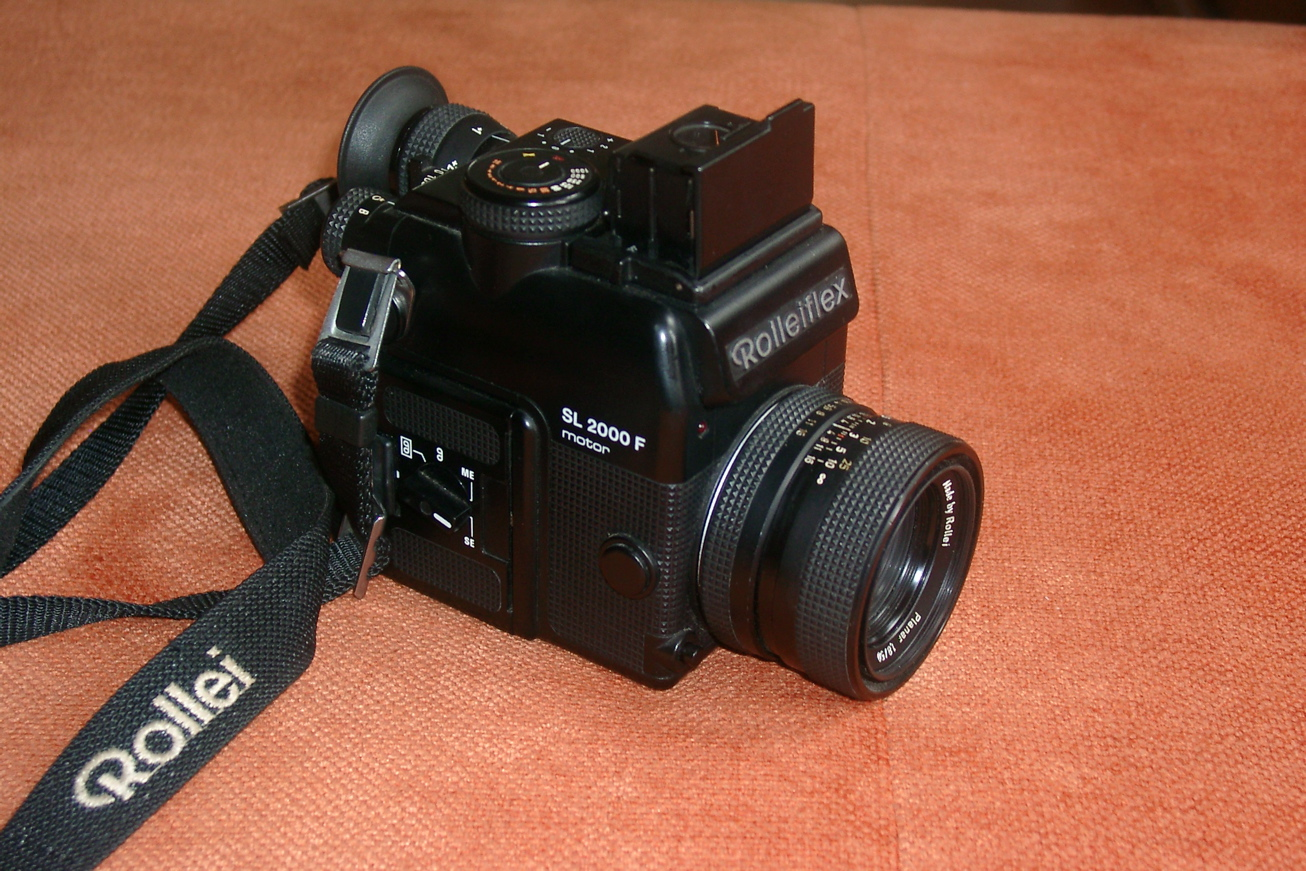
- Rolleiflex SL2000F motor with Planar 1.4/50 lens

Overview
- Maker: Rollei (Franke & Heidecke)
- Type: Modular SLR
- Released: 1981

Lens
- Lens mount: QBM
- Lens: Interchangeable lens

Sensor/medium
- Film format: 35mm
- Film size: 36 mm × 24 mm
- Film speed: 25–6400
- Film speed detection: Manual setting
- Film advance: Motor
- Film rewind: Manual

Exposure/metering
- Exposure modes: Manual (M), Aperture-priority (A), and Bulb (B)

Flash
- Flash: Hot shoe, PC Sync
- Flash synchronization: 1/125 s

Shutter
- Shutter: Electronically timed vertical running metal shutter
- Shutter speed range: 16s – 1/1000 s with Bulb and 1/125 s flash sync

Viewfinder
- Viewfinder: Telescopic eye-level or waist-level

General
- Battery: 5×AA or NiCd pack
- Dimensions: 3.5×4.75×6.25 in (88.9×120.7×158.8 mm)
- Weight: 2 lb 12 oz (1,200 g) (incl. lens, without batteries)
- Made in: Germany

The Rolleiflex SL2000F is a line of modular 135 film single lens reflex cameras (SLR) made by Rollei which share the QBM lens mount with the earlier Rolleiflex SL35 line, adding interchangeable film backs, similar in concept to contemporary medium format SLR systems including the Rolleiflex SL66 / SLX, Hasselblad V-System, and Mamiya RB67. The SL2000F was first announced at photokina in 1976, and released in 1981 after a prolonged development period. It was succeeded by the SL3003 (1984), which extended the fastest shutter speed from 1/1000 to 1/2000 sec., and SL3001 (1985), a simplified SL3003 which removed the waist-level finder and reverted to 1/1000 sec.

== History ==
The prototype SL2000 was first exhibited at photokina '76, featuring both aperture- and shutter-priority autoexposure modes along with a top speed of 1/2000 sec. However, when it was released in February 1981 for Germany and selected other European countries, the shutter-priority mode had been dropped and the top speed reduced to 1/1000 sec. Rollei's bankruptcy later that year halted production temporarily.

The SL3003 was shown at photokina '84, increasing the fastest shutter speed and adding a grip to the right side of the camera; it required the NiCd battery pack.

== Design ==
The SL2000F body includes both eye- and waist-level finders. The SL2000F offers motorized film advance at up to an observed three frames per second, powered by a battery pack that attaches to the rear of the film magazine; either five AA batteries can be used, or a separate NiCd pack is available. Film must be rewound back into the cartridge manually.

Manually selectable shutter speeds range from 16 to 1/1000 sec., with a "B"ulb mode. The vertically-traveling focal plane shutter has a maximum flash synchronization speed of 1/125 sec. In aperture-priority automatic exposure mode, the camera can select a top speed of 1/2000 sec. under certain conditions.

An accessory Sportsfinder Prism was released in 1983.

=== Lenses ===
The Rolleiflex SL2000F takes the same lenses as the Rollei SL35, which use the QBM (quick bayonet mount) interface. Some lenses were designed by Carl Zeiss AG and manufactured by Rollei under license, while others were designed and manufactured by Zeiss. In addition, Rollei manufactured a lower-cost line of Rolleinar MC lenses for QBM.

=== Backs ===
The standard magazine back requires the photographer to set the film speed and roll length using two dials; film is carried in an interchangeable cassette insert which can be removed through the bottom of the magazine independently of the magazine itself.

In 1983, Rollei introduced a 250-exposure magazine back. Also that year, a Polaroid film back was released. A 750-exposure magazine back was introduced in 1988.
