= Leaf (Israeli company) =

Israeli photography company

- Type: Division of Phase One
- Industry: Digital imaging
- Founded: Massachusetts, USA (1991)
- Headquarters: Kfar Saba, Israel
- Products: Digital backs

Leaf is an Israeli company that manufactures high-end digital backs for medium format and large format cameras. It was previously a division of Scitex and later Kodak, and is now a subsidiary of Phase One. In 1991, Leaf introduced the first medium format digital camera back, the Leaf DCB1, nicknamed ‘The Brick’, which had a resolution of 4 million pixels (4 megapixels). As of 2012, Leaf produces the Credo line of digital camera backs, ranging from 40 to 80 megapixels. Until 2010, Leaf also produced photography workflow software Leaf Capture.

== Products ==
=== Digital camera backs ===
After Leaf's DCB, the digital backs evolved into two product lines, the Aptus and the (now discontinued) Valeo. The main difference is that the Aptus models have a 3.5-inch touchscreen, where the Valeos have no on-board display. The Valeos can still be used untethered by using the DP-67 software or the more recent WiView software on a Compaq iPAQ. The iPAQs are connected via Bluetooth with the digital backs. For untethered usage, you will need battery packs for both the Aptus and the Valeo, otherwise the back must be powered via a FireWire connection to a computer. The Valeo models need a Leaf Digital Magazine as well for untethered use, where the Aptus models have a Compact Flash slot.

==== Current models ====
Credo is the current generation of digital camera backs from Leaf, and the first Leaf back based on Phase One platform and not Leaf legacy platforms. Some of the changes are that the back no longer has a cooling fan, but instead makes use of passive cooling. Also to be noted is the new hi res capacitive touch screen which no longer require stylus pen. The back also boots in one second with Phase One OS. Previous Windows CE operating system took up to 10 seconds to reboot.

The differences between Credo and Aptus II:

- Interface: Credo has both FW800 and USB3 interfaces. Aptus II has only FW800 interface. Aptus uses a proprietary L-shaped FW connector, while Credo uses a straight regular connector. Thick head connectors will not fit into either backs. Credo uses standard USB3 type B connector and standard cables may be used. Officially only 3 meter USB3 cables are supported, but 5 and 7.5 meters were tested and worked with repeaters. FW cables in Credo and Aptus are supported up to 10 meters.
- Battery: Credo uses an internal battery, and Aptus uses an external battery. Credo can't operate without a charged battery inside it. When Aptus is tethered it can work only without battery, as the battery port and cable port are overlapping. The Credo battery is charged when using powered FW800, but not when using USB. It is possible to use low powered Windows tablets to tether Credo, while Aptus generally requires tethering to a laptop which has a FW port that is powered from AC. Aptus can load a double capacity and size battery, which Credo can't, since the battery goes into a slot in the Credo body.
- Screen: Credo has a smaller screen but with more resolution. Credo has capacitive touch screen (more sensitive like current smart phones), and Aptus has a resistive touch screen (less sensitive, like older PDAs)
- Connection protocols: Credo is much faster to connect in tethering than Aptus, and establishes a more stable connection.
- Colors: Credo colors are more accurate and less punchy and unique than Aptus colors.
- Sensitivity - Credo is 1/3 stop more sensitive to light than Aptus, using the same ISO settings.
- Body compatibility: Aptus can work on all 645 Mamiya models from AFD and upwards. Credo requires 645DF and upwards, and can work with 645AFD III only when version 1 of the firmware is installed on it. Interfacing to non Mamiya 645 bodies, such a RZ67, HY6, Hasselblad H/V, Contax, tech cameras is unchanged from Aptus.
- Long exposures: Credo can do much longer exposures than Aptus with acceptable noise.
- Noise: Credo has slightly less noise in high ISO than Aptus in normal length exposures.
- File format: Credo produces IIQ files same as Phase One backs. There are two types of files: large and small. Large has no compression and small has some compression and about half the size. The "Large" files can be opened by Adobe Photoshop and Lightroom. IIQ files are not compatible with Leaf Capture.
- Live view: Credo has live view on the back's screen - Aptus has live view only on tethered computer. Since both live views are CCD based, they are significantly inferior to live views on current CMOS sensors.
- All ports in the Credo body are covered ("weather sealed").
- Credo body is made of metal, Aptus has plastic/metal combination. Credo has a metal heatsink, while Aptus has a cooling fan, which makes some noise and can make the back freeze in icy winds.
- Aptus has a detachable LCD protector cover which Credo does not have.
- Turning on/off: Tethered Aptus automatically turns on when the computer is turned on, and autocratically turns off when the computer is turned off. Credo must be turned on and off manually, and also turns off automatically after a period of idle time.

Model	Sensor Size	Resolution	Active Pixels	ISO range	Dynamic range	Frames per Second	Lens conversion factor	Display	Storage	Host Connection	Released
Credo 50	44 x 33 mm	50 MP, 16 bit	8280 x 6208	100-6400	14 f-stops	1.2	1.25	3.2-inch 1.5-megapixel Retina-type multi touchscreen	CF up to UDMA 6	IEE1394b FireWire 800 and USB3	2014
Credo 80	53.7 x 40.4 mm	80 MP, 16 bit	10328 x 7760	35–800	12.5 f-stops	0.7	1.0	3.2-inch 1.5-megapixel Retina-type multi touchscreen	CF up to UDMA 6	IEE1394b FireWire 800 and USB3	2012
Credo 60	53.9 x 40.4 mm	60.5 MP, 16 bit	8984 x 6732	50–800	12.5 f-stops	1.0	1.0	3.2-inch 1.5-megapixel Retina-type multi touchscreen	CF up to UDMA 6	IEE1394b FireWire 800 and USB3	2012
Credo 40	43.9 x 32.9 mm,	40 MP, 16 bit	7320 x 5484	50–800	12.5 f-stops	1.2	1.25	3.2-inch 1.5-megapixel Retina-type multi touchscreen	CF up to UDMA 6	IEE1394b FireWire 800 and USB3	2012

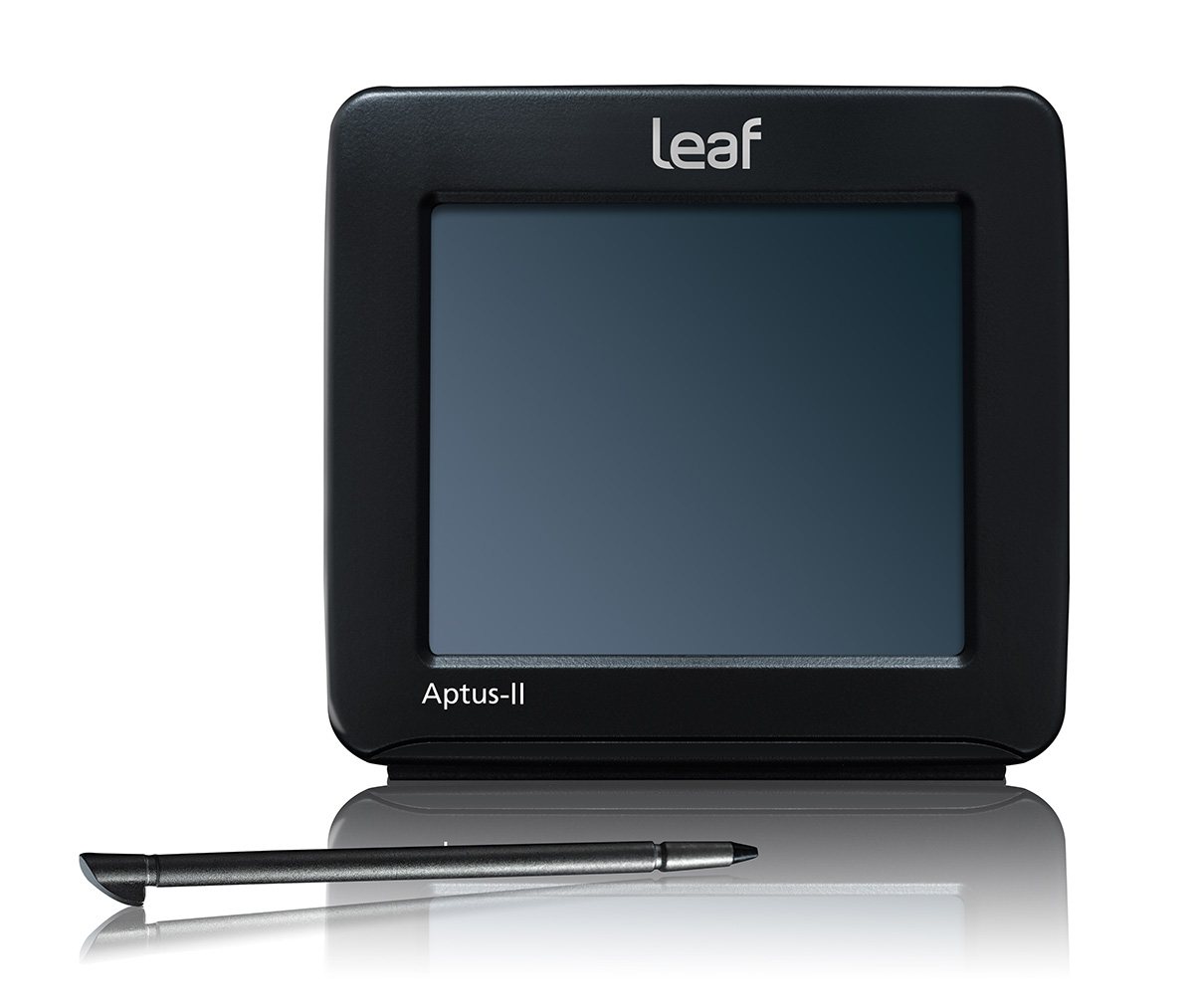
Aptus II digital back

Aptus II models are very similar to corresponding previous Aptus models, with the notable differences:

- Live view available with Phase One 645AF and 645DF bodies (+ Mamiya AFD III & DF), no dongle required. Live view is available on Capture One with large format bodies for legacy Aptus 22 and up, Live View dongle is no longer required.
- Camera controls (aperture, shutter speed and shutter release) on Phase One 645AF and 645DF bodies (+ Mamiya AFD III & DF)
- Faster shooting speed, shot-to-shot and faster transmission to tethered computer
- FireWire 800 connection replaces FireWire 400
- Slightly different color response

The following table shows the models which Leaf still shows on their website as current models.

Model	Released	Sensor Size	Resolution	Active Pixels	ISO range	Dynamic range (f-stops)	Seconds/Frame	Lens conversion factor	Display	Storage	Notes
Aptus-II 12R	2010	53.7x40.3 mm	80 MP, 16-bit	10320 x 7752	80-800	12	1.5	1.0	3.5-inch touchscreen	FireWire, CF	Rotating sensor
Aptus-II 12	2010	53.7x40.3 mm	80 MP, 16-bit	10320 x 7752	80-800	12	1.5	1.0	3.5-inch touchscreen	FireWire, CF	
Aptus-II 8	2010	44x33 mm	40 MP, 16-bit	7360 x 5562	80-800	12	.8	1.3	3.5-inch touchscreen	FireWire, CF	
Aptus-II 7	2009	48x36 mm	33 MP, 16-bit	6726 x 5040	50-800	12	1.1	1.1	3.5-inch touchscreen	FireWire, CF	
Aptus-II 5	2009	48x36 mm	22 MP, 16-bit	5356 x 4056	25-400	12	.9	1.1	3.5-inch touchscreen	FireWire, CF	

==== Discontinued Models ====
Model	Released	Sensor Size	Resolution	Active Pixels	ISO range	Dynamic range (f-stops)	Seconds/Frame	Lens conversion factor	Display	Storage	Notes
Aptus-II 10R	2010	56x36 mm	56 MP, 16-bit	9288 x 6000	80-800	12	1	1.0	3.5-inch touchscreen	FireWire, CF	Rotating sensor
Aptus-II 10	2010	56x36 mm	56 MP, 16-bit	9288 x 6000	80-800	12	1	1.0	3.5-inch touchscreen	FireWire, CF	
Afi-II 10	2008	56x36 mm	56 MP, 16-bit	9288 x 6000	50-800	12	1		3.5-inch Tilt touchscreen	FireWire, CF, Digital Magazine	
Afi-II 7	2008	48x36 mm	33 MP, 16-bit	6726 x 5040	50-800	12	1.1		3.5-inch Tilt touchscreen	FireWire, CF, Digital Magazine	
Aptus-II 6	2009	44x33 mm	28 MP, 16-bit	6144 x 4622	50-800	12	1	1.3	3.5-inch touchscreen	FireWire, CF	
Afi-II 6	2008	44x33 mm	28 MP, 16-bit	6144 x 4622	50-800	12	1		3.5-inch Tilt touchscreen	FireWire, CF, Digital Magazine	
Afi 7	2007	48x36 mm	33 MP	6726 x 5040	50-800	12			3.5-inch touchscreen		
Afi 6	2007	44x33 mm	28 MP	6144 x 4622	50-800	12			3.5-inch touchscreen		
Afi 5	2007	48x36 mm	22 MP	4056 x 5356	25-400	12			3.5-inch touchscreen		
Aptus 75s	2006	48x36 mm	33 MP	6726 x 5040	50-800	12	1.2, unlimited burst		3.5-inch touchscreen	FireWire, CF, Digital Magazine	
Aptus 65s	2006	44x33 mm	28 MP	6144 x 4622	50-800	12	1, unlimited burst		3.5-inch touchscreen	FireWire, CF, Digital Magazine	
Aptus 54s	2006	48x36 mm	22 MP	4056 x 5356	25-400	12	.87, unlimited burst		3.5-inch touchscreen	FireWire, CF, Digital Magazine	
Aptus 75	2005	48x36 mm	33 MP	6726 x 5040	50-800	12	1.7, 5 frames burst		3.5-inch touchscreen	FireWire, CF, Digital Magazine	
Aptus 65	2005	44x33 mm	28 MP	6144 x 4622	50-800	12	1.5, 6 frames burst		3.5-inch touchscreen	FireWire, CF, Digital Magazine	
Aptus 22	2005	48 x 36 mm	22 MP, 16-bit	4056 x 5356	25-400	12	.9, no burst	1.1	3.5-inch touchscreen	FireWire, CF, Digital Magazine	Bluetooth
Aptus 17	2005	43 x 32 mm	17 MP, 16-bit	3576 x 4716	25-400	12	1.2, no burst		3.5-inch touchscreen	FireWire, CF, Digital Magazine	Bluetooth
Valeo 22wi	2004	48 x 36 mm	22 MP, 16-bit	5356 x 4056	25-200	12	2.3		iPaq	FireWire, Digital Magazine(+iPaq)	Bluetooth
Valeo 17wi	2004	43 x 32 mm	17 MP, 16-bit	3576 x 4716	25-200	12	1.7		iPaq	FireWire, Digital Magazine(+iPaq)	Bluetooth
Valeo 22	2003	48 x 36 mm	22 MP, 16-bit	5356 x 4056	25-200	12	2.3		none (tethered only)	FireWire, Digital Magazine	
Valeo 17	2003	43.2 x 31.7 mm	17 MP, 16-bit	3576 x 4716	25-50	12	1.7		none (tethered only)	FireWire, Digital Magazine	
Valeo 11	2002	36x24mm	11 MP, 16-bit	4056x2684	50-200	12			none (tethered only)	FireWire, Digital Magazine	
Valeo 6	2002	36x24 mm	6 MP, 14-bit	3150 x 2100	125-250	11	.7		none (tethered only)	FireWire, Digital Magazine	
C-MOST	2002	36x24 mm	6.6 MP, 16-bit	3150 x 2100		11	.33		none (tethered only)		
Cantare XY		36x24 mm	6 MP, 16-bit	2048 x 3072	50-100				none (tethered only)		XY-Weave
Cantare		36 x 24 mm	6 MP, 14-bit	2048 x 3072	50-100				none (tethered only)		1-shot
Volare		36 x 24 mm	6 MP, 14-bit	2048 x 3072					none (tethered only)		3-shot
DCB II Live	1996	40 x 40 mm	4 MP, 14-bit	2048 x 2048	25-200	11	.75		none (tethered only)	Leaf PCI, NuBus	
DCB	1992	40 x 40 mm	4 MP	2048 x 2048	25-200	11	.75		none (tethered only)		

==== Camera Mounts ====
The Aptus-II models are equipped with a specific mount to fit one of the following camera systems:

Brand	Type
Phase One	645AF, 645DF (Same mount as Mamiya)
Mamiya	645DF, 645AFD (I+II+III), RZ67 (Pro II), RZ Pro IId, RB67
Hasselblad	H-system
Hasselblad	V-system (not 200 or 2000 versions)
Leaf AFi	Also sold by Rollei and Sinar as "Rolleiflex Hy6" or "Sinar Hy6"
Contax	645AF
Fuji	GX680II, GX680III - not a Leaf mount; adapter available from 3rd party
Bronica	SQA, SQAi, ETRSi (No longer made)

It is impossible to convert the mount of a digital back for a different medium format body via adapter or conversion plates, because the sensor would then not sit within the film plane (since the sensor needs to sit the same distance from the lens that the film would). Such conversion may be possible by sending the back to Leaf to be physically reconfigured, depending on the specific model.

Any mount can be used on view cameras by using the correct adapter plate, for example: Alpha, Arca, Cambo, Horseman, Kata, Linhof, Sinar, Toyo, Rollei X-Act2, and other via Leaf Graflok or third party adapters. This is because view cameras have an adjustable focal plane.

The AFI backs (in the Discontinued Models) are specifically designed to work with Sinar and Rollei systems.

=== Accessories ===
==== Leaf Digital Magazine ====
The Leaf Digital Magazine, or LDM, is a portable, small FireWire-powered hard drive that enables a digital back lacking a Compact Flash slot to be used untethered. There are three models, the 5GB, 10 GB and 20 GB. It can be mounted in the U-bracket, which can also contain two (smaller than normal) batteries. This U-bracket can then be mounted underneath the camera. There are short FireWire cables available to connect the LDM to the Leaf digital back.

=== Software ===
==== Capture One / Capture One Pro ====
Capture One is a tethering software, Raw image format converter and workflow software which enables photographers to deliver ready-to-use images with adjusted color and detail. It is designed to create very high image quality and provides a series of tools created to match the professional photographer's daily workflow. Capture One replaced Leaf Capture as tethering and processing software for all Leaf Aptus and Aptus II backs.

==== Leaf Capture ====
Image capture workflow software, available for Apple Inc. OS X and Microsoft Windows. Leaf capture is no longer developed, and is Replaced by Capture One for all Aptus and Aptus II models.

- Image comparison
- Camera control (of non-manual cameras)
- Loupe tool, focus preview
- Realtime live view display
- Grid and layout overlay
- Color temperature and tint sliders
- Adjustable histogram
- Moiré removal tool

Note: From v11.2.9 on only supports Aptus models

==== Leaf Capture Remote App / Server ====
Used together, allows browsing of your "Shots" folder on Wireless devices (iPad, iPod Touch and iPhone). The app works via the device's wireless local area network connection with Leaf Capture Server running on a host computer

==== Leaf WiView ====
Leaf WiView is an update of the DP-67 software. It is an application that enables you to have wireless control (via Bluetooth) over your Leaf imaging module to view and edit images on an HP iPAQ Pocket PC as you shoot.

- Known supported iPAQ models: hx2100, hx2400, hx2700, hx4700, rx5900, 110, 210.
- Known supported Leaf models: Valeo 17wi, Valeo 22wi, ...

==== Leaf DP-67 ====
The Leaf DP-67 application on an HP iPAQ allows wireless remote communication with the Leaf Valeo digital camera back via Bluetooth. The advantages of large storage space for your images and full control over the capture process are maintained by the Leaf Digital Magazine and Leaf DP-67 (iPAQ) display and control devices.
