= Rolleiflex SLX =

SLR cameras from Rolleiflex

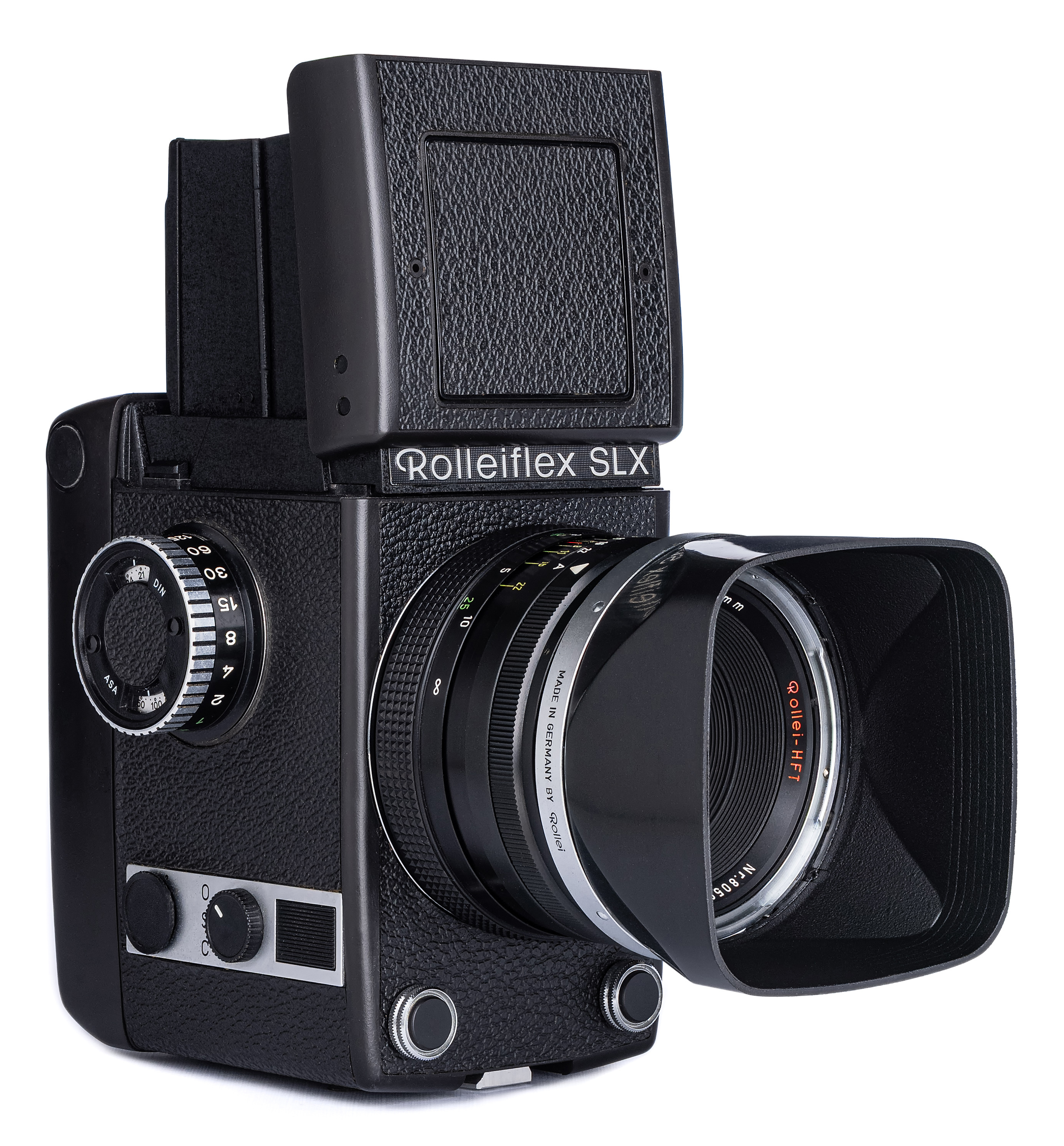
- Rolleiflex SLX, with standard Planar HFT 80 mm f/2.8 lens and waist-level finder, open

Overview
- Type: Medium format single-lens reflex camera

Focusing
- Focus: manual

Exposure/metering
- Exposure: TTL exposure

Flash
- Flash: hot shoe

The Rolleiflex SLX is a line of medium format single lens reflex cameras made by Rollei, in regular production starting from 1976. The SLX incorporated electronic autoexposure and motorized film transport, competing directly with the integrated-motor Hasselblad 500EL/M and effectively displacing the earlier Rolleiflex SL66 line, although the older camera continued to be produced.

The SLX was discontinued shortly after the Rolleiflex 6006 was released in 1984.

== History ==
After the introduction of the all-mechanical SL66 in 1966, Rollei began designing a successor which would incorporate electronics to enable contemporary features from small-format photography, including autoexposure and motorized film transport. The prototypes initially were designated SLC66, then SLX66, and finally were revealed at photokina '74 as the SLX. The SLX reached retail markets in Spring 1976.

Internal updates aimed to improve reliability were rolled out as an SLX Mark II in 1978 and the original SLX was discontinued in 1979. The updated cameras may be distinguished by the color of the trim plate surrounding the power/drive mode dial and 14-pin DIN interface on the right side of the camera. On the original SLX, this is an unpainted aluminum plate, while on the updated models, this is painted black.

== Design ==
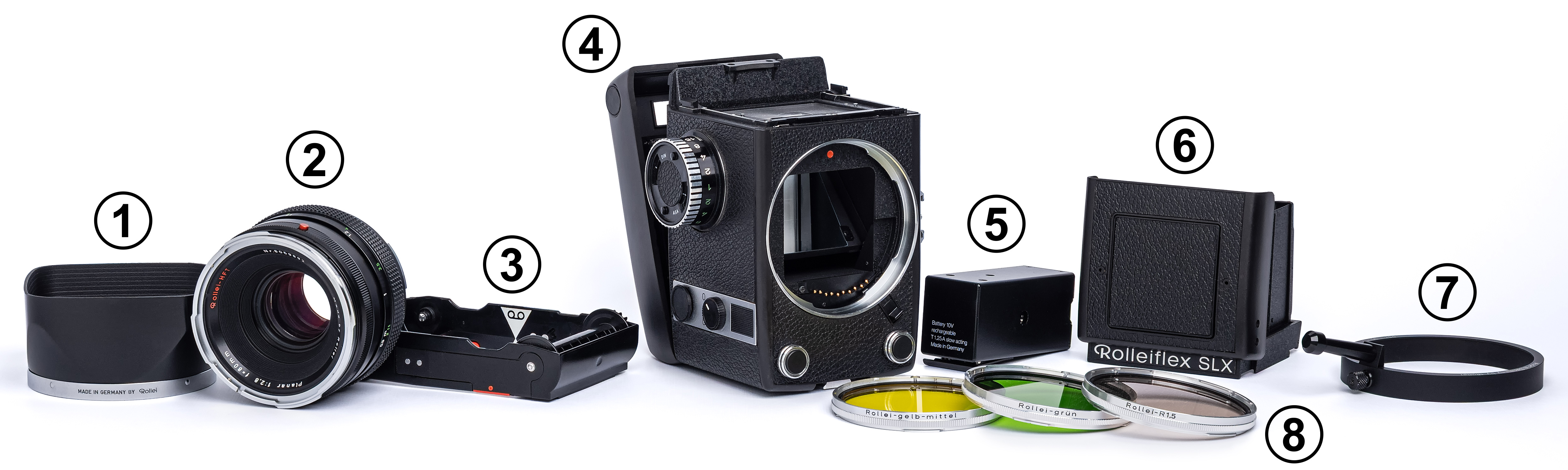
Rolleiflex SLX system: 1. Lens hood; 2. Rollei-HFT Planar 80 mm f/2.8 lens; 3. Film holder; 4. Camera body (with back opened); 5. Battery; 6. Folding waist-level finder; 7. Fast focus lever; 8. Filters

Like the Rolleiflex TLR, SL66, and the Hasselblad SLR, the SLX uses 120 or 220 rollfilm to produce frames of up to 6×6 cm (nominal); the actual image size is based on imperial units, measuring 2 1/4×2 1/4 in (57×57 mm). The camera has a modular design; the central camera body incorporates the single-lens reflex mirror and exposure controls, with interfaces accommodating interchangeable lenses, viewfinders, and focusing screens. Some of the accessories for the SLX may be interchanged with the SL66, including the focusing screens.

With the standard (80 mm) lens and folding waist-level finder, the SLX measures 153×138×85 mm (6.0×5.4×3.3 in) (L×H×W) and weighs 1.8 kg (4.0 lb).

=== Basic operation ===
Compared to the SL66, the SLX adds shutter-priority autoexposure capability and drops the manual crank for motorized film advance and shutter charging. The light meter is now integrated into the camera body, instead of being housed in an accessory viewfinder. In addition, the SLX back is integrated into the camera and cannot be removed; film is loaded into an interchangeable holder, but these are not protected by a dark slide.

The main switch falls under the photographer's right hand, and has three rotary positions for "O"ff, "S"ingle, or "C"ontinuous exposures. A 14-pin interface for remote operation and a depth-of-field preview button (stop-down) are next to the main switch.

The opposite side of the camera has a strap lug, hotshoe, and a slot to accommodate the rechargeable NiCd battery; advertised stamina is 1000 exposures per charge. It measures 75×30×36 mm (3.0×1.2×1.4 in) (LWH) and operates at 9.6 V with a capacity of 450 mA-hr. The battery has an integrated 20 mm cartridge fuse (0.8 A / 250 V) to protect the film transport motor from overcurrent in case of a jammed mechanism.

Two separate shutter releases are provided on the bottom front corners of the camera, which may be operated by the photographer's right or left hand. Shutter speeds are selected by a knob operated by the photographer's right hand and range from 30 to 1/500 sec in whole steps. Since lenses are focused by helicoid extension, the traditional focusing knob on the left side of Rolleiflex SL66 and TLR cameras is not present.

=== Backs ===
Film is loaded into interchangeable film holders, which are inserted into the hinged back at the rear of the camera.

Both 6×6 and 645 rollfilm holders were available; the 645 back produces images that are 1 3/4×2 1/4 in (44×57 mm) in landscape orientation. In addition, a Polaroid back was available

=== Lenses ===
The SLX uses conventional helicoids for focusing instead of the extending focusing bellows on the camera body of the SL66. In addition, SLX lenses all are equipped with in-lens leaf shutters. Because of this, SLX and SL66 lenses are not compatible.

A 10-pin interface is provided to transmit signals between the lens and camera body. The leaf shutter and aperture leaves are driven by voice coil motors, which Rollei called "linear motors". The aperture control ring on each lens has a separate setting at "A", which puts the camera into shutter-priority autoexposure.

Interchangeable lenses for Rolleiflex SLX cameras
FL (mm)	Apr.	Name	Series	Construction		Min. Focus	Dimensions			Notes
FL (mm)	Apr.	Name	Series	Ele	Grp	Min. Focus	Φ×L	Wgt.	Filter	Notes
Ultra wide angle lenses
40	f/4–32	Distagon HFT	SLX	10	9	0.50 m (1 ft 8 in)	102×126 mm (4.0×5.0 in)	1,450 g (51 oz)	Bay VIII	
Wide angle lenses
50	f/4–32	Distagon HFT	SLX	7	7	0.50 m (1 ft 8 in)	81.5×96 mm (3.2×3.8 in)	840 g (30 oz)	Bay VI	
55	f/4.5–32	PCS Super Angulon	SLX	10	8	0.50 m (1 ft 8 in)	104×157 mm (4.1×6.2 in)	1,650 g (58 oz)	104	Perspective control lens
Normal lenses
80	f/2.8–22	Planar HFT	SLX	7	5	0.90 m (2 ft 11 in)	81.5×63 mm (3.2×2.5 in)	590 g (21 oz)	Bay VI	
Portrait lenses
120	f/5.6–45	S-Planar HFT	SLX	6	4	0.95 m (3 ft 1 in)	81.5×100 mm (3.2×3.9 in)	830 g (29 oz)	Bay VI	For macro photography
150	f/4–32	Sonnar HFT	SLX	5	3	1.40 m (4 ft 7 in)	81.5×102 mm (3.2×4.0 in)	890 g (31 oz)	Bay VI	
Telephoto lenses
250	f/5.6–45	Sonnar HFT	SLX	4	3	2.50 m (8 ft 2 in)	81.5×168 mm (3.2×6.6 in)	1,200 g (42 oz)	Bay VI	
350	f/5.6–45	Sonnar HFT	SLX	4	4	5.00 m (16.40 ft)	90.0×227 mm (3.5×8.9 in)	1,650 g (58 oz)	68	
Zoom lenses
140~280	f/5.6–45	Variogon	SLX	17	14	2.50 m (8 ft 2 in)	94×240 mm (3.7×9.4 in)	1,850 g (65 oz)	95	

Extension tubes and a bellows unit were available for close-up work.

=== Viewfinders and focusing screens ===
As standard equipment, the SLX comes with a folding waist-level finder with a built-in magnifier and a ground glass focusing screen with a central split-image rangefinder spot surrounded by a microprism collar, grid lines etched at regular intervals, and an integrated Fresnel lens. The viewfinder displays an image 55×55 mm (2.2×2.2 in), which is 93% of the area recorded on the film. The magnifying lens in the viewfinder could be changed. Other available viewfinders include:

- Rigid magnifying hood, which accommodates waist-level viewing with better shielding of the focusing screen
- Rotating pentaprism finder (45°), which provides an eyepiece at 45° from vertical, and rotates to allow viewing from the side or front
- Rotating pentaprism finder (90°), which provides a horizontal eyepiece for eye-level operation, and rotates to allow viewing from the side or front

The screen could be changed to one of several alternatives, which are shared with the SL66:

Focusing screens for Rollei SLX cameras
Image	Catalog	Grid	Fresnel field lens	Central focusing aid(s)	Notes
	560 060	Yes (11 mm)	Yes	Microprism (15 mm dia.)	
	560 050	Yes (11 mm)	Yes	Split-image rangefinder (5 mm dia.)	
	560 040	Yes (11 mm)	Yes	No	
	560 180	Yes (11 mm)	Yes	Microprism (15 mm dia.) and split-image rangefinder (5 mm dia.)	Standard screen
	560 030	No	No	No	
	560 100	Yes (11 mm)	Yes	Clear with crosshair and measuring graticule	

=== Remote control ===
Rollei offered the ME-1 multi-exposure control unit for the SLX; it allows the photographer to record up to ten images on a single frame, at a selectable interval between 0.1 and 1.5 seconds. It was supplied with a 2 m (6 ft 7 in) cable as standard, and a 10 m (33 ft) cable was available as an accessory.
