= Rolleiflex Hy6 =

SLR cameras from Rolleiflex

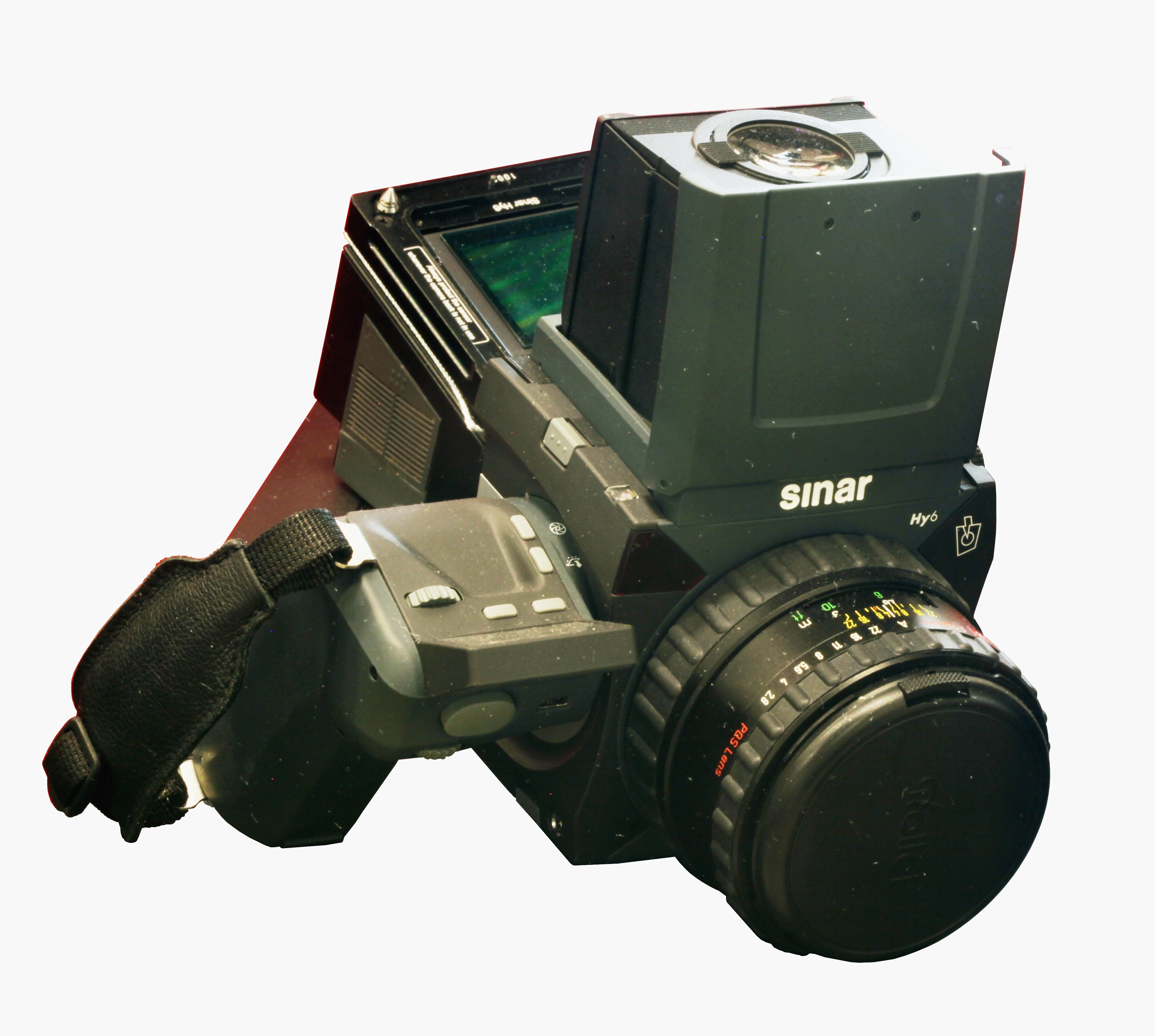
- Sinar Hy6 with digital sensor back, detached.

Overview
- Type: Medium format single-lens reflex camera

Focusing
- Focus: automatic

Exposure/metering
- Exposure: TTL exposure

Flash
- Flash: hot shoe

The Rolleiflex Hy6, also sold as the Leaf Digital AFi and Sinar Hy6, is a line of medium format single lens reflex cameras designed by Jenoptik for Rollei, introduced in 2006 and in intermittent production starting from 2008. The Hy6 is a hybrid, accepting both analog film and digital image sensor backs, competing directly with the Hasselblad H-series.

The Hy6 uses the same lenses and lens mount as the Rolleiflex 6000 System and eventually displaced the older line. The bankruptcy of Franke & Heidecke GmbH in 2009 complicated later production, with manufacturing continued by successor companies DHW Fototechnik GmbH (from 2010 to 2014) and DW Photo GmbH (from 2017).

== History ==
Prototypes of the Hy6 were shown at photokina 2006 by Sinar, Leaf, and Franke & Heidecke; the camera was developed by a partnership between Jenoptik, who were responsible for the electronics, and Franke & Heidecke, who handled the mechanical aspects. F&H was responsible for manufacture and Jenoptik held the rights to distribute completed cameras, so cameras were built by Franke & Heidecke, then purchased from Jenoptik for sale by F&H (as the Rolleiflex Hy6), Sinar (Hy6), or Leaf (AFi).

Each of the three companies planned to sell the same basic body, distinguished by their own backs:

- Leaf AFi - Leaf (Kodak) digital back
- Rolleiflex Hy6 - analog film back
- Sinar Hy6 - Sinar digital back

Originally, the Hy6 was intended to be the core of an open system, but after Jenoptik acquired a majority stake (51%) of Sinar in 2005, the camera bodies were locked to Leaf, Sinar, and Rollei backs only. Franke & Heidecke (F&H) commenced large-scale production of the Hy6/AFi in March 2008 at the former Rollei factory in Braunschweig.

In 2009, the bankruptcy and subsequent closure of F&H and other corporate ownership changes complicated the efforts of F&H, Sinar, and Leaf to market the Hy6/AFi. After F&H closed in 2009, production of the Hy6/AFi ceased. After reorganizing as DHW Fototechnik GmbH in 2010, production of the Hy6 resumed, and an updated model, the Hy6 mod2, was introduced in 2012. However, DHW Fototechnik also filed for bankruptcy in 2014, interrupting production until 2017, when assembly resumed in Braunschweig under DW Photo GmbH.

Leica Camera AG announced in 2006 they had acquired Jenoptik's controlling interest in Sinar, but Jenoptik rescinded the sale later that year. When F&H announced its pending closure, it was noted that Sinar still had "significant stocks" of the Hy6, but Sinar did not make a final decision immediately. Leica completed the acquisition of Jenoptik's stake in Sinar in 2013, and Sinar began supporting the Leica S-System.

In June 2009, Leaf was spun off from Kodak and its assets were acquired by Phase One; due to slow production of Hy6/AFi camera bodies, Phase One was given a license to build digital backs for the AFi. With the insolvency of F&H, Leaf announced the AFi was put on hold. Later in 2009, Phase One acquired a large stake in Mamiya and shifted their marketing to Mamiya-based digital cameras, including the 645AF, sold as the Phase One 645DF.

== Design ==
=== Backs ===
Backs for Hy6/AFi bodies
| Mfr. & Model | Sensor size | Resolution |
|---|---|---|
| Mamiya Leaf Credo 80 | 53.7×40.3 mm (2.11×1.59 in) | 10320×7752 (80 MP) |
| Mamiya Leaf Credo 60 | 53.9×40.4 mm (2.12×1.59 in) | 8984×6732 (60 MP) |
| Leaf AFi-II 12 | 53.7×40.4 mm (2.11×1.59 in) | 10320×7752 (80 MP) |
| Leaf AFi/AFi-II 10 | 56×36 mm (2.2×1.4 in) | 9288×6000 (56 MP) |
| Leaf AFi/AFi-II 7 | 48×36 mm (1.9×1.4 in) | 6726×5040 (33 MP) |
| Leaf AFi/AFi-II 6 | 44×33 mm (1.7×1.3 in) | 6144×4622 (28 MP) |
| Leaf AFi 5 | 48×36 mm (1.9×1.4 in) | 5356×4056 (22 MP) |
| Rollei (F&H) 4560 | 44.5×57.2 mm (1 3/4×2 1/4 in) | film |
| Rollei (F&H) 6060 | 57.2×57.2 mm (2 1/4×2 1/4 in) | film |
| Sinar Sinarback eVolution86 H | 48×36 mm (1.9×1.4 in) | 8082×6042 (48.8 MP) |
| Sinar Sinarback eVolution75 H | 48×36 mm (1.9×1.4 in) | 6668×4992 (33 MP) |
| Sinar Sinarback eMotion e75 LV | 48×36 mm (1.9×1.4 in) | 6668×4992 (33 MP) |
| Sinar Sinarback eSpirit 65 LV | 44×33 mm (1.7×1.3 in) | 6496×4872 (31.6 MP) |
| Sinar Sinarback eMotion e54 LV | 48×36 mm (1.9×1.4 in) | 5344×4008 (22 MP) |
| Sinar Sinarback 54 MC | 48×36 mm (1.9×1.4 in) | 5344×4008 (22 MP) |

=== Lenses ===
The Hy6 uses the same physical lens mount first released with the Rolleiflex SLX in 1976 and subsequently updated for the 6000 System cameras. However, the earliest lenses are not compatible with Hy6 bodies; lenses in the PQ / EL / PQS lines which are compatible with the 6008 and newer bodies will work as manual focus lenses, and AF-PQ/PQS lenses will work without restrictions. The AFD series of lenses released with the Hy6 drop the aperture selection control on the lens, meaning that AFD lenses will work only with Hy6 bodies.
