= Rolleiflex SL66 =

SLR cameras from Rolleiflex

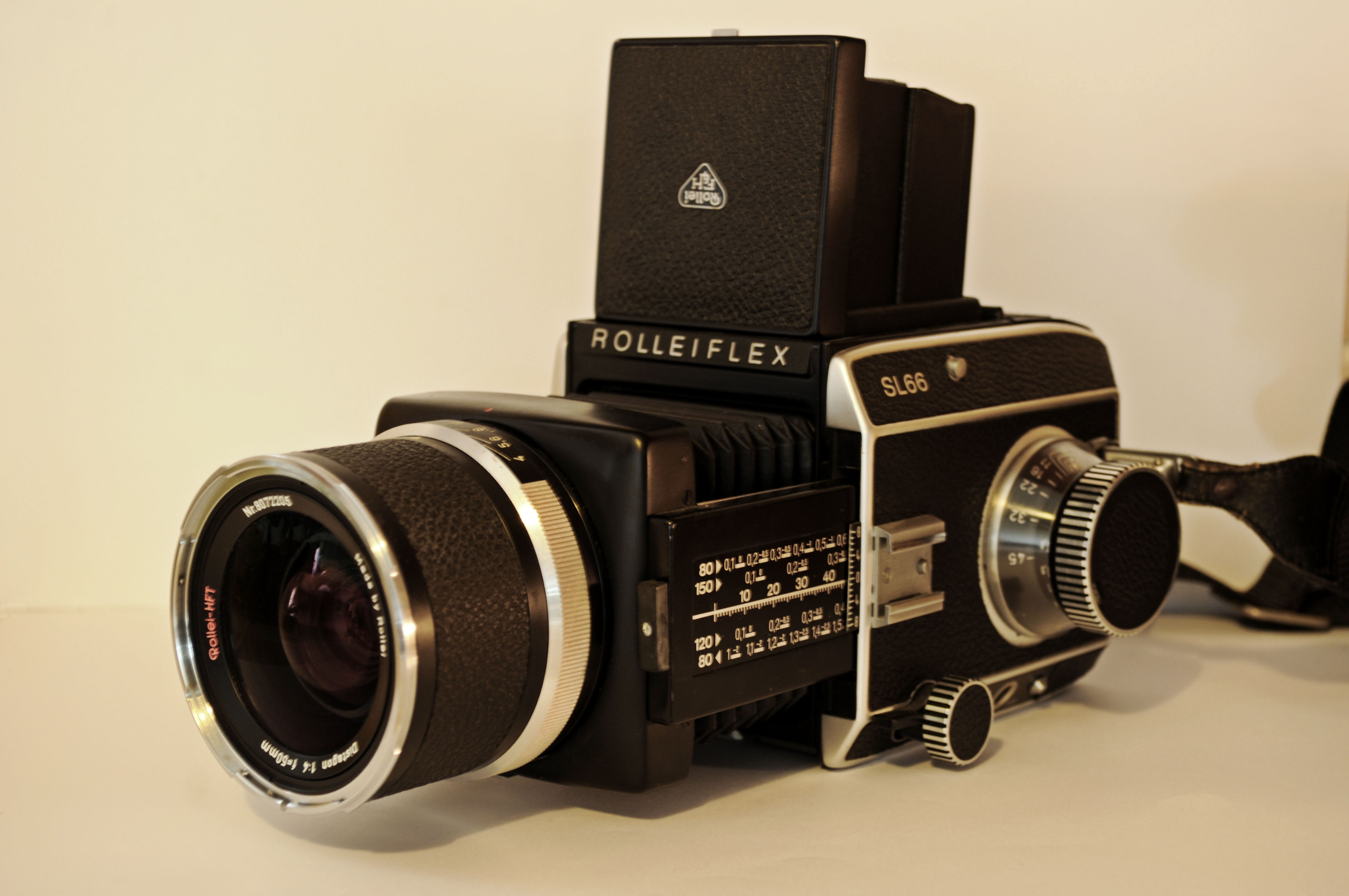
- Rolleiflex SL66

Overview
- Type: Medium format single-lens reflex camera

Focusing
- Focus: manual

Exposure/metering
- Exposure: TTL exposure

Flash
- Flash: hot shoe

The Rolleiflex SL66 is a line of medium format single lens reflex cameras made by Rollei, in regular production starting from 1966 until Rollei's bankruptcy in 1982. The SL66 represented a change in direction for Rollei, which until that time had focused almost exclusively on its popular twin lens reflex cameras, the Rolleiflex and Rolleicord.

The Rolleiflex SLX, which was introduced in 1973, effectively replaced the SL66, although the older camera continued in production. After reorganization, Rollei resumed production of the SL66 and introduced the SL66E; variants of the SL66 were introduced and produced until the line was discontinued in 1992.

== History ==
In 1957, a gentlemen's agreement between Reinhold Heidecke, inventor of the Rolleiflex TLR, and Victor Hasselblad, inventor of the Hasselblad SLR, was reached to ensure that Rollei would not manufacture SLR cameras, and Hasselblad would not manufacture TLR cameras. However, the rapid adoption of SLRs during the 1960s meant that Rollei risked falling behind in this market at a time when demand for TLRs was decreasing. In 1964 plans were made to create a new, technologically advanced SLR to be introduced at the 1966 photokina festival.

Although Rollei never officially discontinued the Rollei SL66, it was removed from their promotional support and dealer catalogs in the UK from 1976 and for all intents and purposes was replaced by the Rolleiflex SLX. The UK importer was Rollei themselves. The Rolleiflex SL66 did not feature in Rollei's worldwide product catalog in 1980, and the US importer's July 1979 dealer price list has no SL66 cameras nor 40mm, 250mm, or 500mm lenses. This strongly suggests that the camera was effectively discontinued from 1976 until the launch of the SL66E in October 1982 after the restart of camera production following the first bankruptcy.

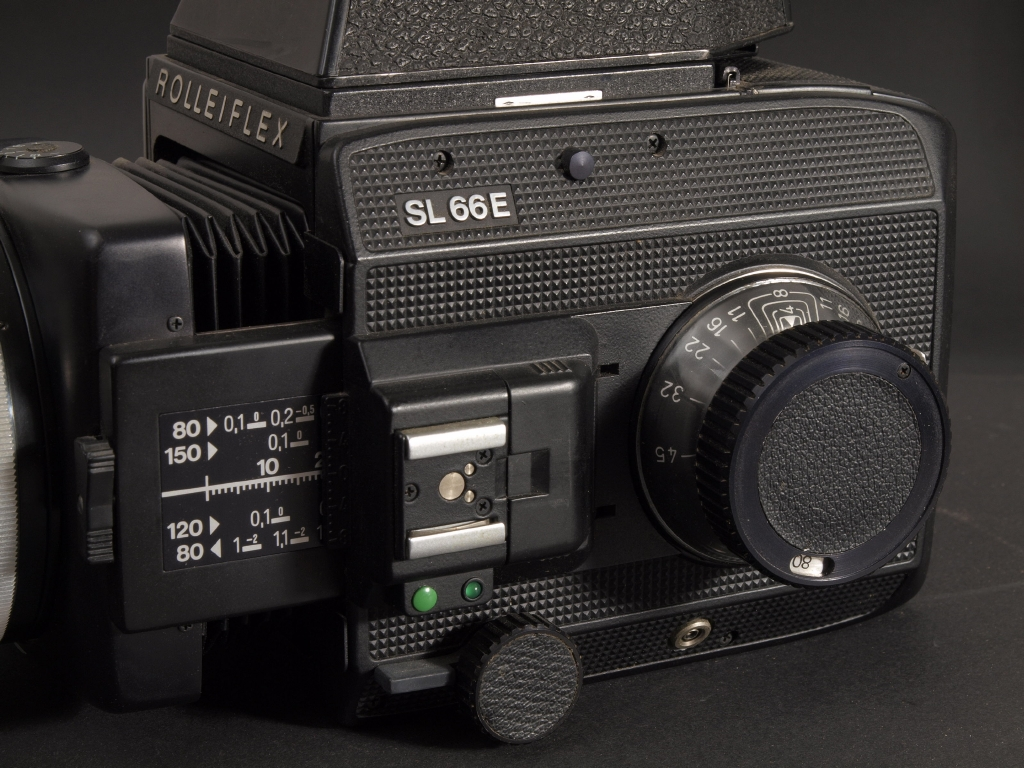
Rolleiflex SL66E; note battery cover, between flash hot shoe and focusing knob, and battery check lamp, below

Three additional cameras based on the SL66 were released starting in 1982: the SL66E, SL66X, and SL66SE. Compared to the SL66, the SL66E, introduced in 1982, adds three silicon photodiodes (SPD) for center-weighted averaging metering through the lens (TTL). In addition, the SL66E is capable of TTL flash exposure control. It uses a single 6 volt PX28 (4SR44) battery. Compared to the SL66E, the SL66X drops ambient light metering but retains TTL flash exposure control using an SPD, while the SL66SE has an upgraded ambient light meter capable of autoexposure and switchable between spot and center-weighted averaging modes, using one or five SPDs, respectively. The SL66SE remained in production until 1992.

== Design ==
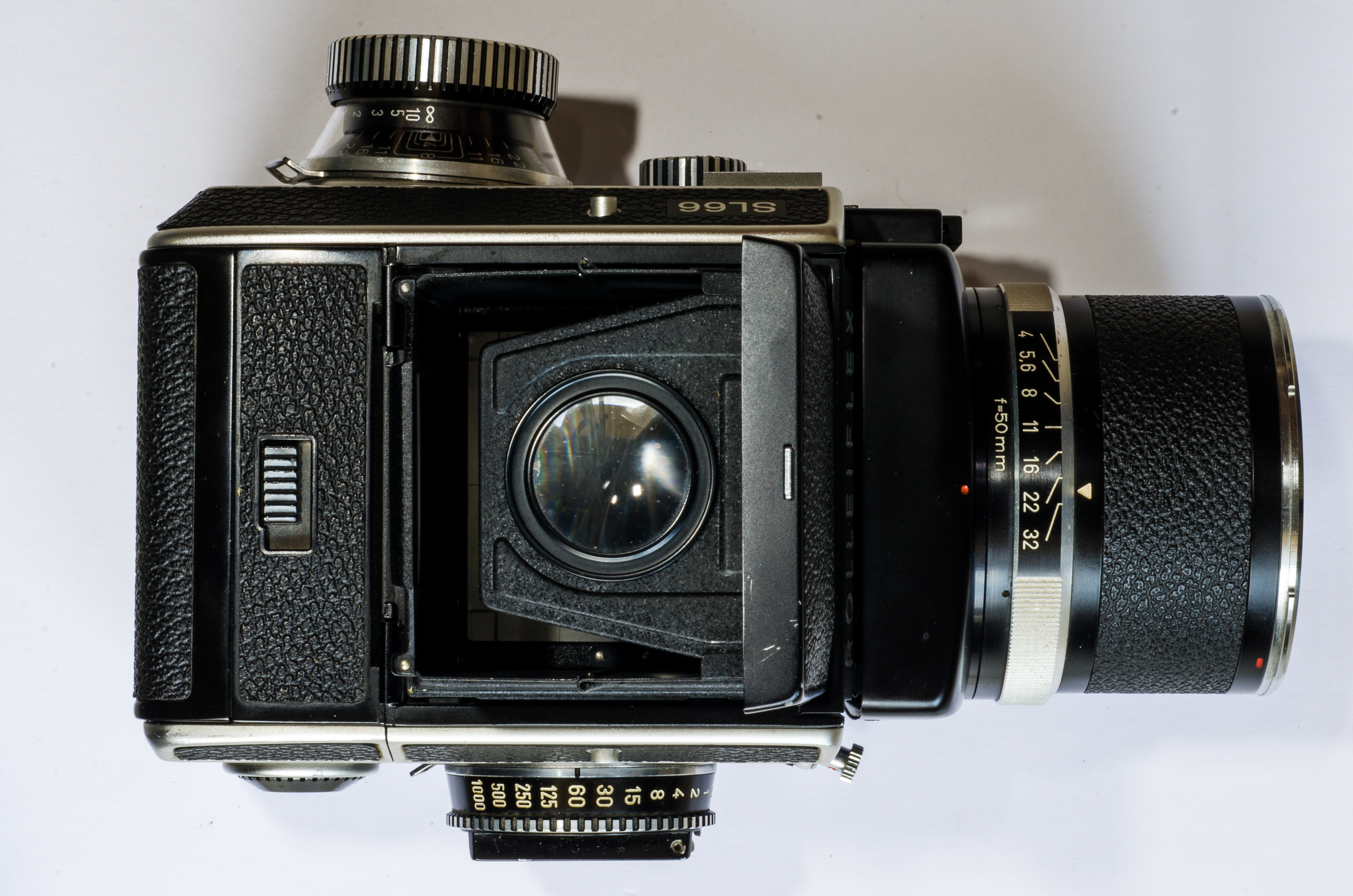
Top view, with waist-level finder open and magnifier deployed; note prominent controls for aperture preset (on lens), focusing distance (left side of camera), and shutter speed (right side of camera)

Like the Rolleiflex TLR and the Hasselblad SLR, the SL66 uses 120 or 220 rollfilm to produce frames of up to 6×6 cm (nominal); the actual image size is based on imperial units, measuring 2 1/4×2 1/4 in (57×57 mm). The camera has a modular design; the central camera body incorporates the single-lens reflex mirror and focusing bellows, with interfaces accommodating interchangeable lenses, viewfinders, focusing screens, and film backs. With the standard (80 mm) lens and folding waist-level finder, the SL66 measures 173×115×103 mm (6.8×4.5×4.1 in) (L×H×W) and weighs 1.9 kg (4.2 lb); the 6×6 rollfilm magazine adds 445 g (15.7 oz) unloaded and 47 mm (1.9 in) to the length.

=== Basic operation ===
The body is equipped with a front lens standard which extends on a bellows for focusing, controlled by a large knob which falls under the photographer's left hand while using the camera. The maximum bellows extension is 50 mm (2.0 in), which gives a magnification ratio of approximately 1/2× using the standard (80 mm) lens. This enables several features unique to the SL66:

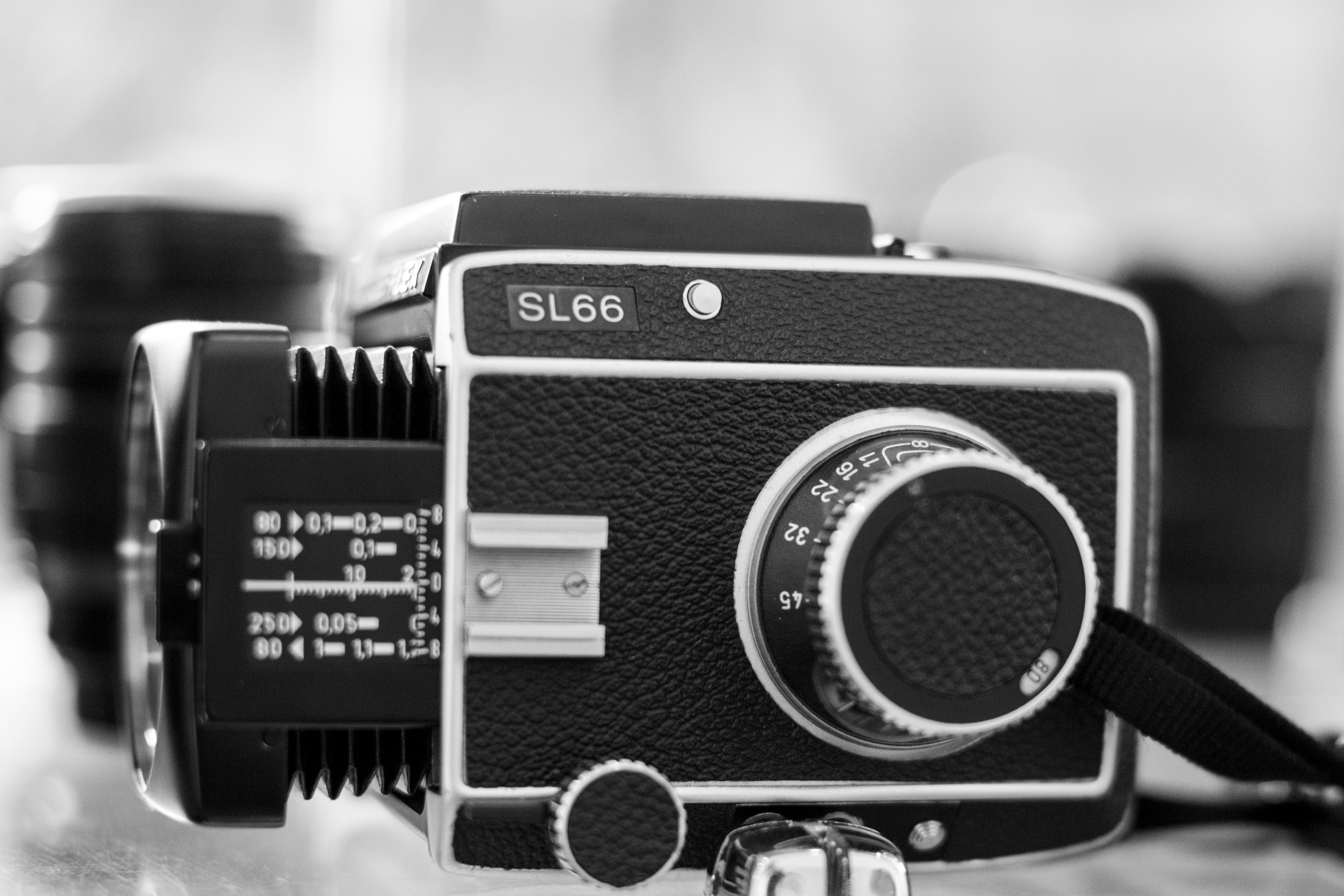
Partially extended bellows, showing magnification scales

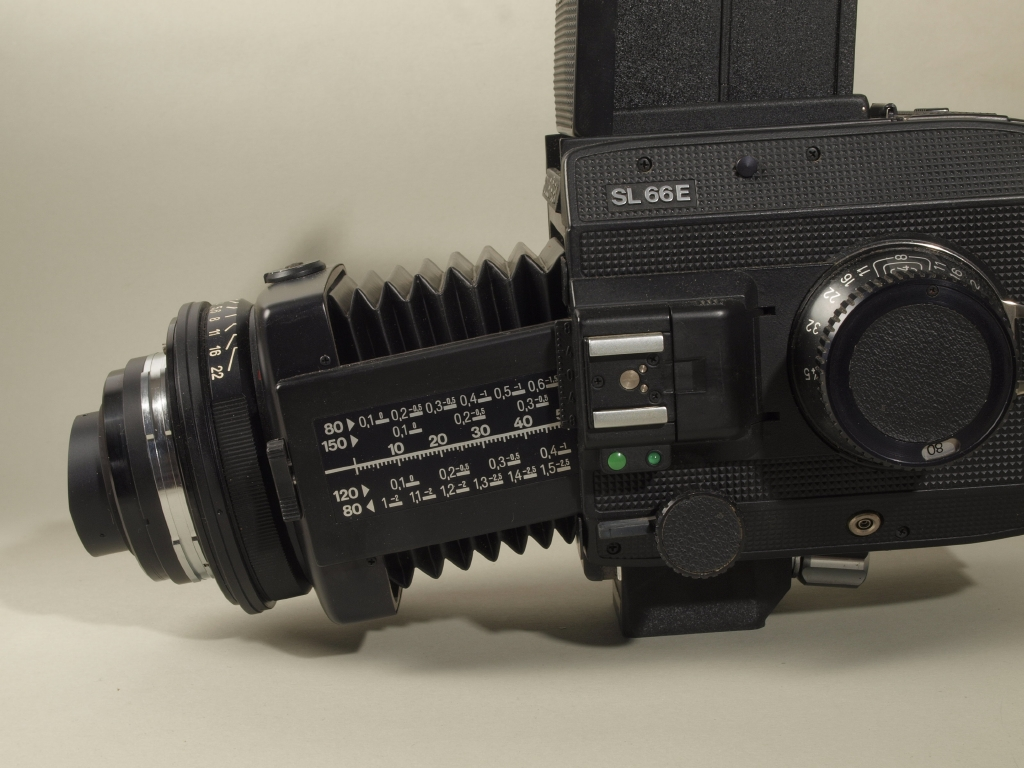
Scheimpflug position, lens in retro position

- Reverse-mounting lenses. Most SL66 lenses (with the exception of the very wide or very long lenses) could be reversed and mounted to the camera without adapters, for use in close-up macro photography. The maximum magnification ratio with a reversed standard (80 mm) lens is 1.5×.
- Lens bellows to accommodate focusing when the lenses are reverse-mounted. Again, this is impossible for most SLR cameras without special adapters.
- Lens tilt movement. The lenses could be tilted up to 8 degrees either up or down, to take advantage of the Scheimpflug principle, enabling greater depth of field, especially in close-up photographs.

An additional extension bellows was available, which allowed a total maximum focus extension of 280 mm (11 in). The focusing knob has built-in focusing distance and depth of field scales for 50, 80, 150, and 250 mm lenses.

The shutter release is on the bottom front corner of the camera, falling under the photographer's right hand. Shutter speeds are selected by a knob operated by the photographer's right hand and range from 1 to 1/1000 sec in whole steps. A crank unfolds from the shutter speed knob to wind the film and tension the shutter; a double-exposure control is provided, allowing the photographer to tension the shutter without winding the film.

The SL66 and its derivatives are equipped with a mechanically-timed focal-plane shutter, using two vertically-traveling cloth blinds; the maximum flash synchronization speed using the focal-plane shutter is 1/30 sec. 80 mm and 150 mm lenses with built-in leaf shutters were introduced in January 1970, which enabled much higher flash synchronization speeds up to 1/500 second. However, with these lenses, the leaf shutter requires manual cocking (tensioning) before each exposure which is not particularly convenient.

=== Backs ===
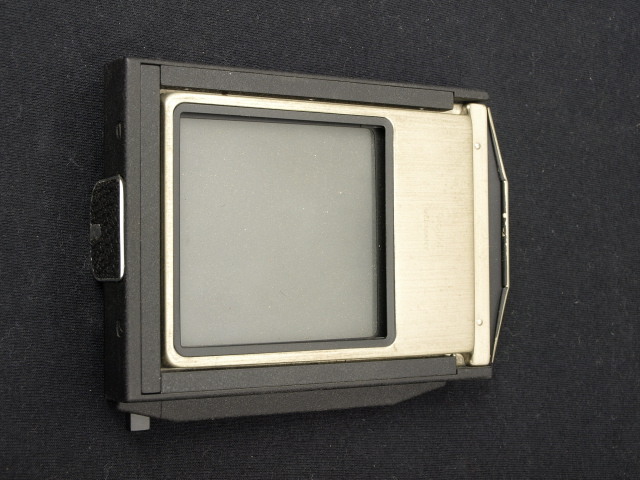
Sheet film back for SL66

Film is loaded into interchangeable backs; these each have a dark slide which allows for mid-roll film changes. To avoid inadvertently spoiling the film, the dark slide must be in place shielding the film before the back can be removed; in addition, the dark slide can only be stored in the top of the magazine when the camera shutter has been cocked, preventing exposures when the dark slide is in place. Both 6×6 and 645 rollfilm backs were available; the 645 back produces images that are 1 3/4×2 1/4 in (44×57 mm), and separate 645 backs were available for vertical and horizontal orientations. In addition, sheet film and Polaroid backs were available.

=== Lenses ===
Because the SL66 body has an extending bellows for focus, the only control on most lenses is for preset aperture selection; lenses with leaf shutters also have shutter speed and cocking controls. All lenses are equipped with an automatic diaphragm; viewing and focusing are performed at full aperture, and the camera stops down the aperture to the preselected setting after the shutter release is pressed, just before exposing the film. A depth of field preview control is provided on the front lens standard, just ahead of the magnification scale on the side of the bellows support.

Interchangeable lenses for Rolleiflex SL66 cameras
FL (mm)	Apr.	Name	Series	Construction		Min. Focus	Dimensions			Notes
FL (mm)	Apr.	Name	Series	Ele	Grp	Min. Focus	Φ×L	Wgt.	Filter	Notes
Fisheye lenses
30	f/3.5–22	F-Distagon (HFT)	SL66	8	7	0.0 m (0 ft)	108×115.5 mm (4.3×4.5 in)	1,130 g (40 oz)	25, internal	
Ultra wide angle lenses
40	f/4–32	Distagon HFT	SL66	10	9	0.5 m (20 in)	125×104 mm (4.9×4.1 in)	1,218 g (43.0 oz)	Bay VIII	
Wide angle lenses
50	f/4–32	Distagon (HFT)	SL66	7	7	0.5 m (20 in)	94×79 mm (3.7×3.1 in)	555 g (19.6 oz)	Bay VI	
Normal lenses
75	f/4.5–32	PCS-Rolleigon HFT	SL66	11	9	0.4 m (16.93 in)	103×161 mm (4.1×6.3 in)	1,313 g (46.3 oz)	Bay VIII	Perspective control lens bundled with ball/tilt adapter
80	f/2.8–22	Planar (HFT)	SL66	7	5	0.2 m (6.5 in)	79×63 mm (3.1×2.5 in)	300 g (11 oz)	Bay VI	
80	f/4–32	Distagon (HFT)	SL66	5	5	0.2 m (6.5 in)	82×86 mm (3.2×3.4 in)	638 g (22.5 oz)	Bay VI	Includes leaf shutter
Portrait lenses
120	f/2–16	Planar (HFT)	SL66	7	5	0.4 m (14 in)	90×87 mm (3.5×3.4 in)	810 g (29 oz)	86	
120	f/5.6–45	S-Planar (HFT)	SL66	6	4	0.4 m (14 in)	79×91 mm (3.1×3.6 in)	435 g (15.3 oz)	Bay VI	For macro photography
150	f/4–32	Sonnar (HFT)	SL66	5	3	0.6 m (2 ft)	79×94.5 mm (3.1×3.7 in)	545 g (19.2 oz)	Bay VI	
150	f/4–32	Sonnar (HFT)	SL66	5	3	0.6 m (2 ft)	82×94 mm (3.2×3.7 in)	705 g (24.9 oz)	Bay VI	Includes leaf shutter
Telephoto lenses
250	f/5.6–45	Sonnar (HFT)	SL66	4	3	1.4 m (4 ft 9 in)	79×143 mm (3.1×5.6 in)	665 g (23.5 oz)	Bay VI	
250	f/5.6–45	Sonnar Superachromat	SL66	6	6	1.4 m (4 ft 9 in)	?	?	?	Includes one CaF element
500	f/5.6–45	Tele-Tessar (HFT)	SL66	6	5	6.1 m (20 ft)	100×308 mm (3.9×12.1 in)	1,640 g (58 oz)	95 / Bay VII	Pre-set (not automatic) diaphragm
1000	f/5.6	Mirotar	SL66	6	4	14.7 m (48.3 ft)	277×405 mm (10.9×15.9 in)	16.5 kg (36 lb)	rear	Special order item from Zeiss
1000	f/8–64	Tele-Tessar (HFT)	SL66	4	4	14.7 m (48.3 ft)	218×820 mm (8.6×32.3 in)	8.74 kg (19.3 lb)	Bay VI	Pre-set (not automatic) diaphragm

In addition to the lenses listed, Rollei offered adapters that allowed the use of Zeiss Luminar macrophotography lenses (with focal lengths of 16, 25, 40, 63, or 100 mm) or a blank adapter that could be drilled to accommodate other lenses with a maximum size of 58 mm (2.3 in).

=== Viewfinders and focusing screens ===
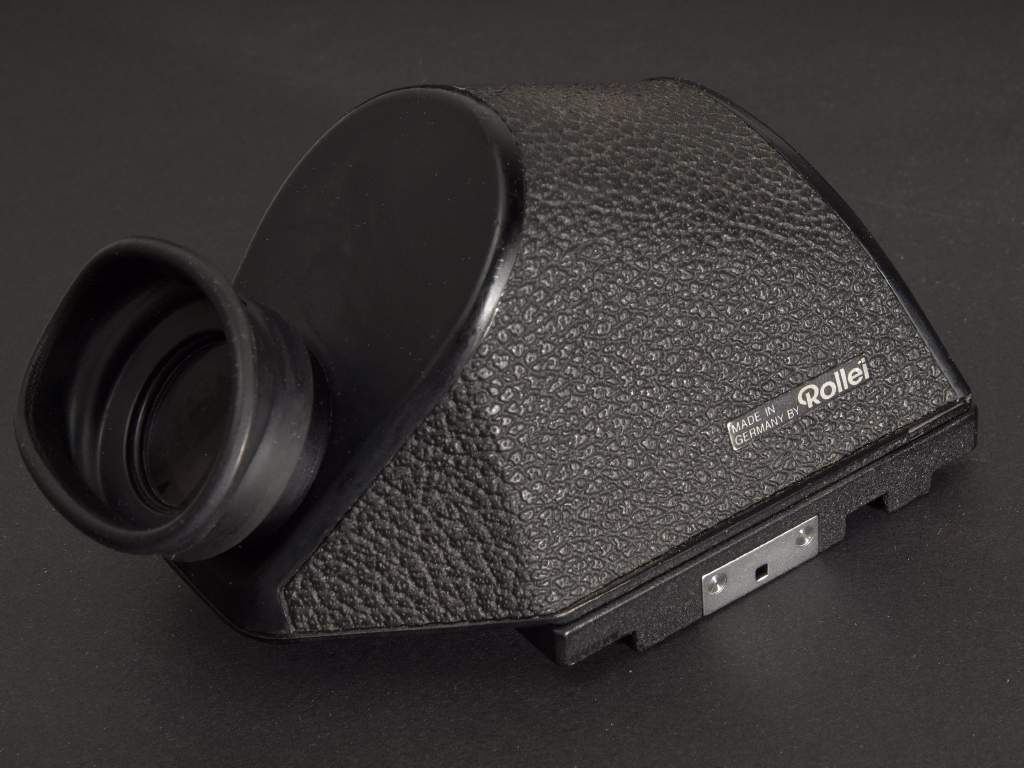
Eye-level pentaprism finder for SL66

As standard equipment, the SL66 comes with a folding waist-level finder with a built-in magnifier and a ground glass focusing screen with a central microprism spot, grid lines etched at 11 mm (0.43 in) intervals, and an integrated Fresnel lens. The viewfinder displays an image 55×55 mm (2.2×2.2 in), which is 93% of the area recorded on the film. The magnifying lens in the viewfinder could be changed. Other available viewfinders include:

- Folding hood with sports finder, which is similar to the standard waist-level finder, but includes a folding frame for eye-level viewing
- Rigid magnifying hood, which accommodates waist-level viewing with better shielding of the focusing screen
- Exposure meter hood, which is similar to the rigid magnifying hood with a built-in exposure meter that uses five CdS photoresistors; four are used in a frame-averaged arrangement, and one can be swung down and used to measure the central spot area (15%)
- Pentaprism finder, which provides an eyepiece at 45° from vertical, and rotates to allow viewing from the side or front; sports finder frames could be attached

The screen could be changed to one of several alternatives:

Focusing screens for Rollei SL66 cameras
Image	Catalog	Grid	Fresnel field lens	Central focusing aid(s)	Notes
	560 060	Yes (11 mm)	Yes	Microprism (15 mm dia.)	Standard screen
	560 050	Yes (11 mm)	Yes	Split-image rangefinder (5 mm dia.)	
	560 040	Yes (11 mm)	Yes	No	
	560 180	Yes (11 mm)	Yes	Microprism (15 mm dia.) and split-image rangefinder (5 mm dia.)	
	560 030	No	No	No	
	560 100	Yes (11 mm)	Yes	Clear with crosshair and measuring graticule	
