= Sinar =

Swiss camera manufacturer

Sinar Photography AG
- Industry: Photography
- Headquarters: Zürich, Switzerland
- Products: Large format view cameras, lenses, digital backs, RAW processing software
- Website: sinar.swiss/en/

Sinar Photography AG is a Swiss company based in Zürich manufacturing specialized high-resolution view cameras for studio, reproduction, landscape and architecture photography.

Sinar's view-cameras allow both the lens and the film back or sensor back to move in rotation or linearly in any direction (up/down, left/right, front back linearly, and pitch yaw tilt rotations), thus allowing precise image alignment corrections. The cameras are thus often used in advertising, document reproduction, product and architectural photography, where correctly vertical image lines, fine focus accuracy, and extra details are wanted.

The name SINAR is explained by the company itself as "Still, Industrial, Nature, Architectural and Reproduction photography" in the English version of the April 2011 press release. Other versions of the names were also used, with the S for studio, Sache, or science. In the Indonesian language, Sinar translates into English as "light ray".

== History ==
=== Founding ===
The business recalls its roots to Swiss photographer Carl August Koch who worked in Marseille from 1865 to 1878. In 1879 and 1892 Koch also established two family-owned photography studios in Schaffhausen. Koch worked as a portrait, landscape and alpine photographer and was considered one of the first Swiss champions of alpine photography. From 1894 until his death in 1897, Koch was also president of the Swiss Photographers Association.

His son Hans-Carl expanded the family-owned photography studios to add retail sales of photographic equipment, starting from 1911.

=== Sinar system ===
In 1947, the grandson of Koch senior, Carl Hans, a graduate photographer and photographic salesman, took over the family business on the early death of his father Hans-Carl, and founded the following year the Sinar company. Dissatisfied with the limited or imprecise nature of existing wooden view cameras (e.g. the large Kodak 3 and similar, and the popular Graflex Graphic Graflok series) and the limitations of technical (e.g. Linhof Technika) and field cameras of the day, he developed a modular camera and received in 1947 a patent for his Sinar camera. His main aims were to produce a large format monorail camera system of high precision and simple operation, with readily interchangeable parts and accessories.

The Sinar system's versatility is based on the interchangeability of parts as well as a large number of accessories that have been produced over the years. Major components (rails, bellows, lensboards, and standards) made in the 1940s are still usable with currently manufactured Sinar equipment.

In 1968 Carl Hans' son entered the family business and the company's camera production moved to Feuerthalen (north of Zürich).

=== Changing ownership ===
Jenoptik acquired a majority stake (51%) of Sinar in 2005. Leica Camera announced it had purchased Jenoptik's stake in 2006, but the sale was cancelled before the end of the year. When Jenoptik withdrew from the medium format camera market, Sinar was spun off in July 2009. Sinar moved its base of operations to Zürich in October 2009 after separating from Jenoptik.

On 26 November 2013 Leica Camera AG took over Sinar Photography AG.

== View cameras ==
Sinar p2, with component classes labeled along with lens (L) and geared tripod head (H)

Sinar use a five digit coding system for each of the modular parts in many of their modern view cameras, broken up into two parts separated by a dot (.); the three digits preceding the dot designate the class of the component, while the two digits following the dot designate the specific model or revision of the component.

For example, the base 30 cm (12 in) monorail used for Sinar P-, C-, and F-series view cameras has the code 422.11, where 422 designates the class (monorail) and 11 designates the specific model / length / finish. In this case, the entire 42x class is reserved for monorails and monorail accessories. The base monorail unit (422.11) has two ends with threaded female sockets which each accept the standard male-threaded caps (429.11) or an extension rail, designated 421.11 for the 15 cm (6 in) extension; 423.11, 30 cm (12 in) extension; and 424.11, 45 cm (18 in) extension. Likewise, the rail caps which prevent unlocked standards from sliding off the end of the rail are designated 428.31 (female thread) and 429.11 (male thread). When the system was updated in the 1980s to the P2/ C2/ F2-series, the rails were given a black finish and redesignated 422.21 (base rail), 421.21 / 423.21 / 424.21 (extension rails), and a longer base rail was added, 425.21, double-ended with 90 cm (35 in) length.

The basic classes that make up a Sinar view camera include:

- 411: Rail clamp
- 422: Base monorail
- 431/437: Front standard
- 433: Rear standard
- 452: Bellows
- 461/462: Back (film holder / focusing screen)

Sinar codes for basic / standard outfits
Component Series & Sizes		Complete camera		Monorail			Front std	Bellows	Rear std			Metering back
Component Series & Sizes		Code	Weight	Base rail, 30 cm (12 in)	Rail clamp	Rail caps	Front std	Bellows	Unit	Bearer	Coupling frame	Metering back
Std (NORMA)	4×5	3000 (STD 45)	?	3050 (X210-30) + 3052 (X210-15) (Note: Consists of 30 cm and 15 cm extension rails, which can be used either together or separately.)	3040 (X100)	3056 (X220), 3058 (X231)	3072 (X310/ 360V)	3100 (510)	—N/a	3070 (X310H)	3074 (360H)	3110 (600 km) (Note: This back is a film holder / ground glass screen back only, and does not have the metering probe holder.)
Std (NORMA)	5×7	3002 (STD 57)	?	3050 (X210-30) + 3052 (X210-15)	3040 (X100)	3056 (X220), 3058 (X231)	3072 (X310/ 360V)	3310 (1650)	—N/a	3070 (X310H)	3300 (1610)	3302 (1630)
Std (NORMA)	8×10	3004 (STD 810)	?	3050 (X210-30) + 3052 (X210-15)	3040 (X100)	3056 (X220), 3058 (X231)	3072 (X310/ 360V)	3362 (2070)	—N/a	3070 (X310H)	3350 (2000)	3354 (2050)
p	4×5	491.26	5.3 kg (12 lb)	422.11	411.21	429.11 (×2)	431.21	452.11	—N/a	433.21	433.26	462.16
p	5×7	491.27	6.0 kg (13.2 lb)	422.11	411.21	429.11 (×2)	431.21	452.17	—N/a	433.21	433.27	461.27
p	8×10	491.28	7.1 kg (16 lb)	422.11	411.21	429.11 (×2)	431.21	452.18	—N/a	433.22 (Note: "Special" heavy-duty standard bearer used for the 8×10 frame. Also can be used with smaller 4×5 and 5×7 frames.)	433.28	461.28
p2	4×5	491.76	5.9–6.0 kg (13.0–13.2 lb)	422.21	411.21 or 411.41	429.21 (×2)	431.51	452.11 or 454.11	—N/a	433.51	433.26	462.16
p2	5×7	491.77	6.7 kg (15 lb)	422.21	411.21 or 411.41	429.21 (×2)	431.51	452.17	—N/a	433.51	433.27	462.17
p2	8×10	491.78	8.5 kg (19 lb)	422.21	411.21 or 411.41	429.21 (×2)	431.52	452.18 or 452.58	—N/a	433.52	433.58	462.58
x	4×5	491.66	5.8 kg (13 lb)	422.21	411.21	429.21 (×2)	431.71	454.11	433.76	—N/a	—N/a	461.36
p3	DSLR	491.82	?	422.21	411.41	429.21 (×2)	431.82	454.12	—N/a	433.82	433.81.010 or 433.81.015	—N/a
c	4×5	491.36	4.2 kg (9.3 lb)	422.11	411.21	429.11 (×2)	437.31	452.11	—N/a	433.21	433.26	462.16
c	5×7	491.37	4.9 kg (11 lb)	422.11	411.21	429.11 (×2)	437.31	452.17	—N/a	433.21	433.27	461.27
c	8×10	491.38	5.8 kg (13 lb)	422.11	411.21	429.11 (×2)	437.31	452.18	—N/a	433.21	433.28	461.28
c2	4×5	491.86	4.8 kg (11 lb)	422.21	411.21	429.21 (×2)	431.61	452.11	—N/a	433.51	433.26	462.16
c2	5×7	491.87	6.1 kg (13 lb)	422.21	411.21	429.21 (×2)	431.62	452.17	—N/a	433.51	433.27	462.17
c2	8×10	491.88	7.8 kg (17 lb)	422.21	411.21	429.21 (×2)	431.62	452.18	—N/a	433.52	433.58	462.58
f	4×5	491.46	3.2 kg (7.1 lb)	422.11	411.21	429.11 (×2)	437.31	452.11	433.31	—N/a	—N/a	461.36
f1	4×5	491.16	3.3 kg (7.3 lb)	422.21	411.21	429.21 (×2)	437.61	452.11	433.66	—N/a	—N/a	461.36
f2	4×5	491.96	3.6 kg (7.9 lb)	422.21	411.21	429.21 (×2)	431.61	452.11 or 454.11	433.66	—N/a	—N/a	462.16
f2	5×7	491.97	5.5 kg (12 lb)	422.21	411.21	429.21 (×2)	431.62	452.17	433.67	—N/a	—N/a	462.17
f2	8×10	491.98	7.6 kg (17 lb)	422.21	411.21	429.21 (×2)	431.62	452.18 or 452.58	433.68	—N/a	—N/a	462.58
s1	8×10	491.58	5.0 kg (11.0 lb)	424.11 (Note: Uses 45 cm (18 in) extension rail instead.)	411.21	429.11, 428.31	437.41	452.18	—N/a	433.48 (Note: No tilt or rise/fall movements)	433.28	461.28
s2	8×10	491.68	5.3 kg (12 lb)	424.11	411.21	429.11, 428.31	437.31	452.18	—N/a	433.48	433.28	461.28

Notes

From the code numbers, the main differences between the P- ("Perfection"), C- ("Combination"), and F ("Field")-series are the front and rear standards provided. As the name implies, the C-series combines the front (lens) standard from the F-series with the rear (image) standard from the P-series. A photographer who purchases an F-series camera can upgrade to the equivalent of a C- or P-series camera by changing the standards. In general, Sinar maintains broad component compatibility between the different modular view camera series and generations.

In addition, the same bellows are used for a certain size across all series, so changing format within a series is also possible. For example, the bellows used for all 4×5 cameras is coded 452.11; changing any 4×5 camera to a 5×7 camera would require a new bellows (452.17) along with an appropriate rear standard, frame, and film holder.

=== Norma (Standard) ===
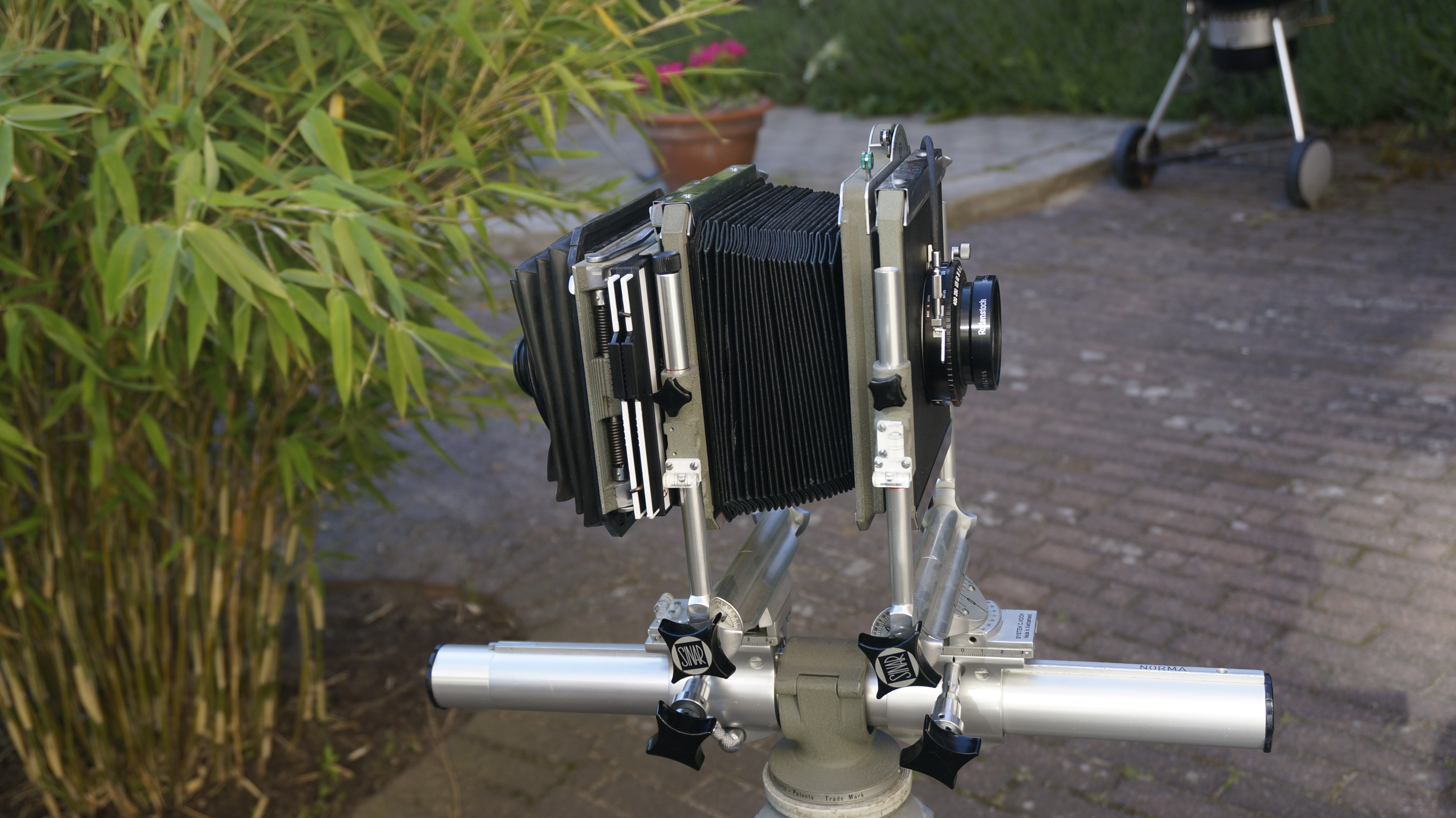
Sinar "Norma"

The original view camera introduced in 1947 and manufactured until 1969 was called the Sinar Standard or, more popularly, Norma, as labeled on the default 30 cm monorail. It was sold in different film sizes (4×5, 5×7, or 8×10). Like the later P-, C-, and F-series, it is a modular system, which Sinar billed as the "Construction-Unit", consisting of interchangeable basic components, including a tripod head (monorail clamp), tubular monorail, front and rear standards, and bellows connecting the standards; the only significant differences between the different film format sizes were the bellows, rear frame, and back.

Carl Koch applied for patents in 1947 and received them for the film holders, front and rear standards, the "optical bench" monorail, and the camera itself. The primary technical advantage of the Sinar over other view cameras was moving the pivoting point for each standard from the center of each frame to the bottom. This permits a greater range of tilt angles.

Sinar also marketed a version of the view camera with additional accessories, including a wide angle bellows and monorail extension, as the Sinar Expert.

=== P-series ===
The Sinar P, introduced in 1970, had asymmetric tilts and swings, as opposed to the traditional center or base tilts. This permitted rapid and precise settings without losing sharpness on the axis.

The P series also introduced features such as self-arresting rack and pinion gearing and a precision-engineered quick format change system that allows the photographer to switch between 4x5/5x7/8x10 formats quickly without having to fully disassemble the rear standard. This was accomplished by using a common rear standard bearer and unlocking a single knob to switch among the various format frames. Another new feature implemented in the P series was the Sinar system of calculating swings and tilts as well as the Sinar depth of field calculator. A key feature of the Sinar P system, particularly in the domain of scientific and industrial photography, is the precise machine tolerances that are part of the fittings and movements.

==== X ====
The Sinar X was offered as a lower-cost alternative to the p2 4×5, with the same range of possible movements but removing other features, such as the metering back and the ability to change film formats.

=== F-series ===
The F series was the light-weight version ("F" for "Field"), offering less refined features than the P series. The difference in weight is significant: the Sinar F 4x5 weighs about 3.3 kg and the Sinar P 4x5 weighs about 5.9 kg.

The original Sinar F is easily identified by a brushed aluminum monorail and other aluminum accents, while the Sinar F1, F2, and F3 models were made of the same materials, but painted black. The Sinar F also has hard plastic knobs, versus the rubber-coated knobs of the F1 and F2.

The Sinar F and F1 models have a clip-on front standard (lens standard) that does not fully enclose the monorail. The advantage is that this standard can easily be removed from the rail by loosening the clamp and lifting straight up, unlike the rear standard, and it is somewhat lighter weight. The disadvantage of this design is that the rail clamping mechanism is susceptible to breakage if over-tightened. The Sinar F2 and F3 models have a different front standard, which completely encloses the rail and also provides a geared focus adjustment, similar to the rear rail clamp on all Sinar F models. The correct F2 standard can easily be identified as it is a mirror image of the rear standard. The earlier F/F1 front standard has a low-profile metal hinge below the rail.

The F2 and F3 models also came standard with a light-metering back, while this was an option for the F and F1 models. The F3 model is a digital/analog model that supports a variety of Sinar digital lenses and digital backs.

=== C-series ===
As noted in Sinar literature, the C-series is a blend of the P- and F-series, using the same monorail and extensions as the other cameras, while fitted with the front standard of the F-series and the rear standard of the P-series.

=== Alpina / A1 ===
The Alpina was introduced in the early 1980s as an entry-level alternative to the F-series. It accepts many of the same accessories and functions similarly to the F-series, using Sinar's calculator scales, but the Alpina uses an extruded, trapezoidal monorail instead of the traditional Sinar tubular monorail, so the standards and rail are exclusive to the Alpina. The camera later was renamed as the a1 and reintroduced in the 1990s.

=== Accessories ===
Sinar has manufactured many accessories since its establishment:

A swing-out filter holder that allows the photographer to use a polarizing filter as well as 4x4 inch gel filters.

A 4x5 reflex attachment that employed an adjustable mirror to optimize viewing of the image. Adapters (now discontinued) were made by Sinar to adapt this viewer to various other view camera makes such as Plaubel, Linhof, and Toyo.

Many of the 4×5 backs will accept Graflok, Linhof, and Polaroid film accessories. For example, the 600 km back included with the "Norma" can be converted to accept accessories from other manufacturers by removing the frame. The Zoom series of roll film backs, which allow the use of 120/220 film formats from 6x4.5 to 6x12 formats with excellent film flatness. The earlier versions of the Zoom film backs are usable on any 4x5 camera with an international (Graflok) back (later holders no longer have the Graflok grooves required).

The Sinar LCD shutter system enables their CCD camera backs to have a much extended density range in video mode for focusing capability in a wider range of ambient lighting. This system has been used in modified mode by RIT to obtain multispectral images suited to aging analysis of color pigments in artworks.

Integration of Canon and Nikon SLR cameras as camera backs onto the P standard with adapters from fellow Swiss camera accessories manufacturer, Foba.

Instead of the traditional leaf shutter and diaphragm mechanisms, Sinar also offered an Automatic Shutter, which was self-cocking but offered a limited range of shutter speeds from 8 to 1/50 sec. and bulb; a Rear Set Diaphragm, which was independent of the lens, and an Automatic Diaphragm, which stopped down to a preset aperture once the film holder was inserted. Later cameras could be fitted with an electronically timed shutter.

Film plane metering probes and meters.

Digital backs for the high-end studio environments.

=== Gallery ===
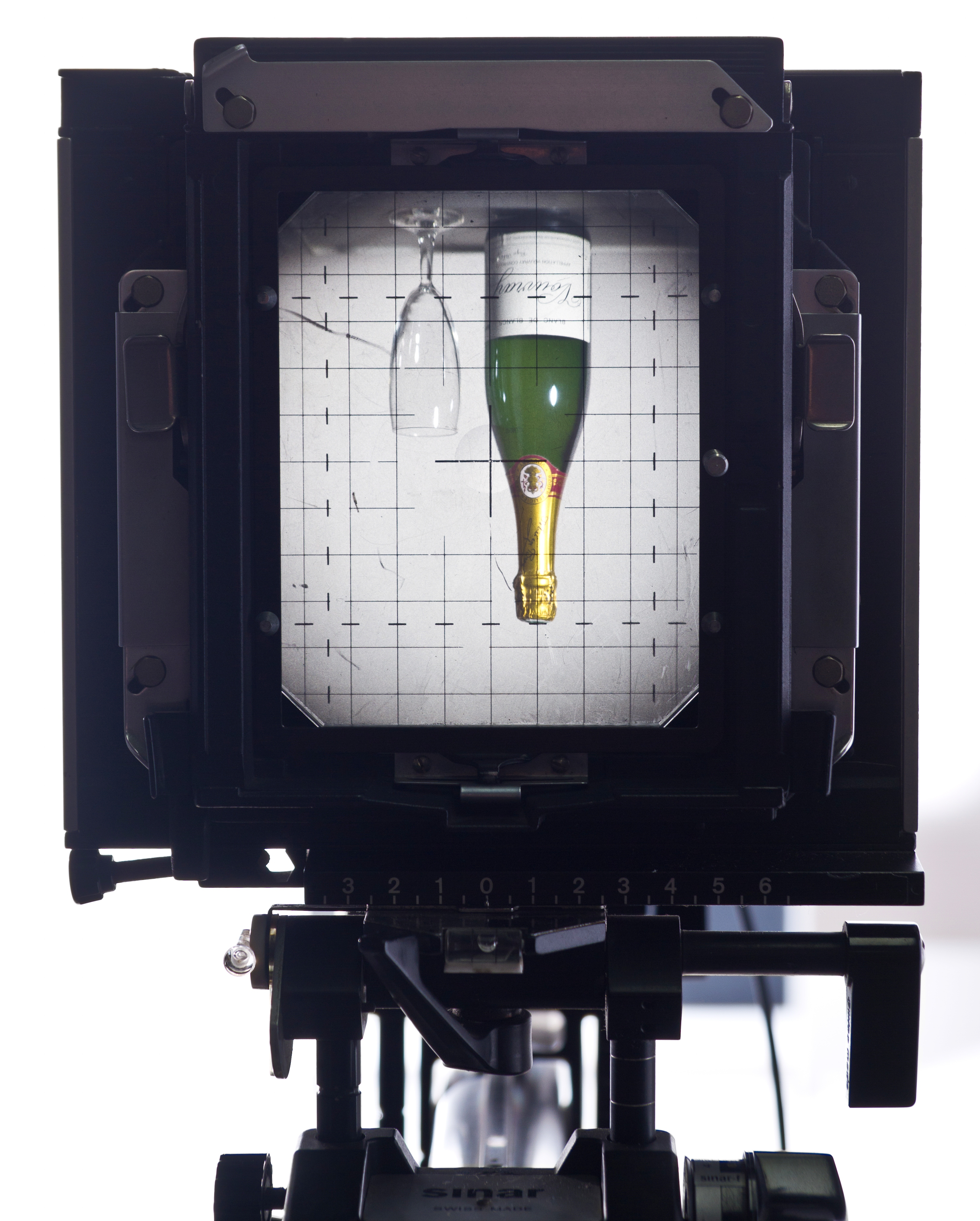
Viewing through a Sinar F camera

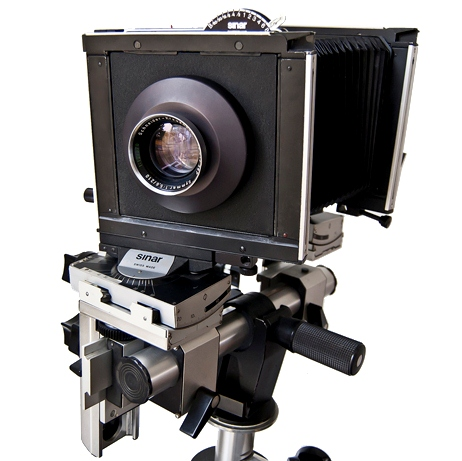
Sinar P (4×5")

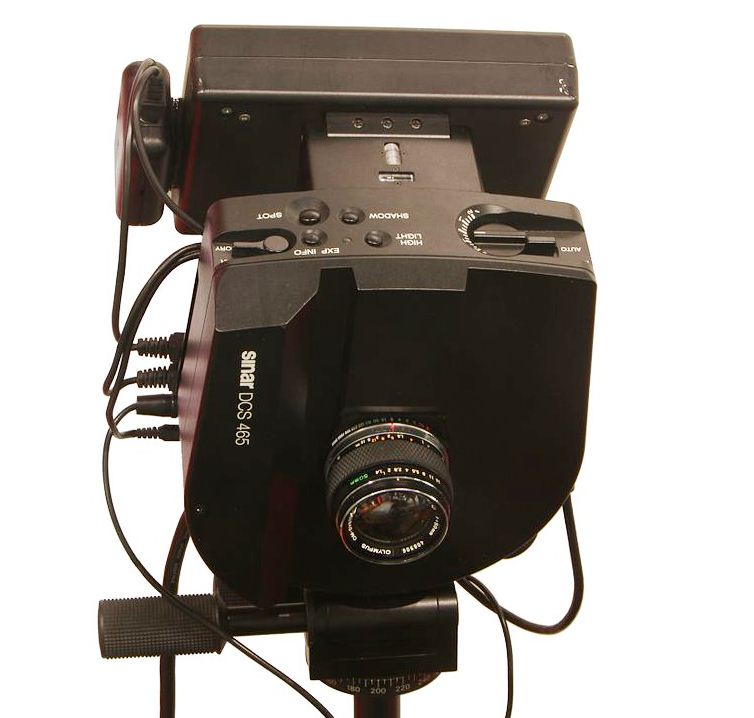
Sinar DCS465

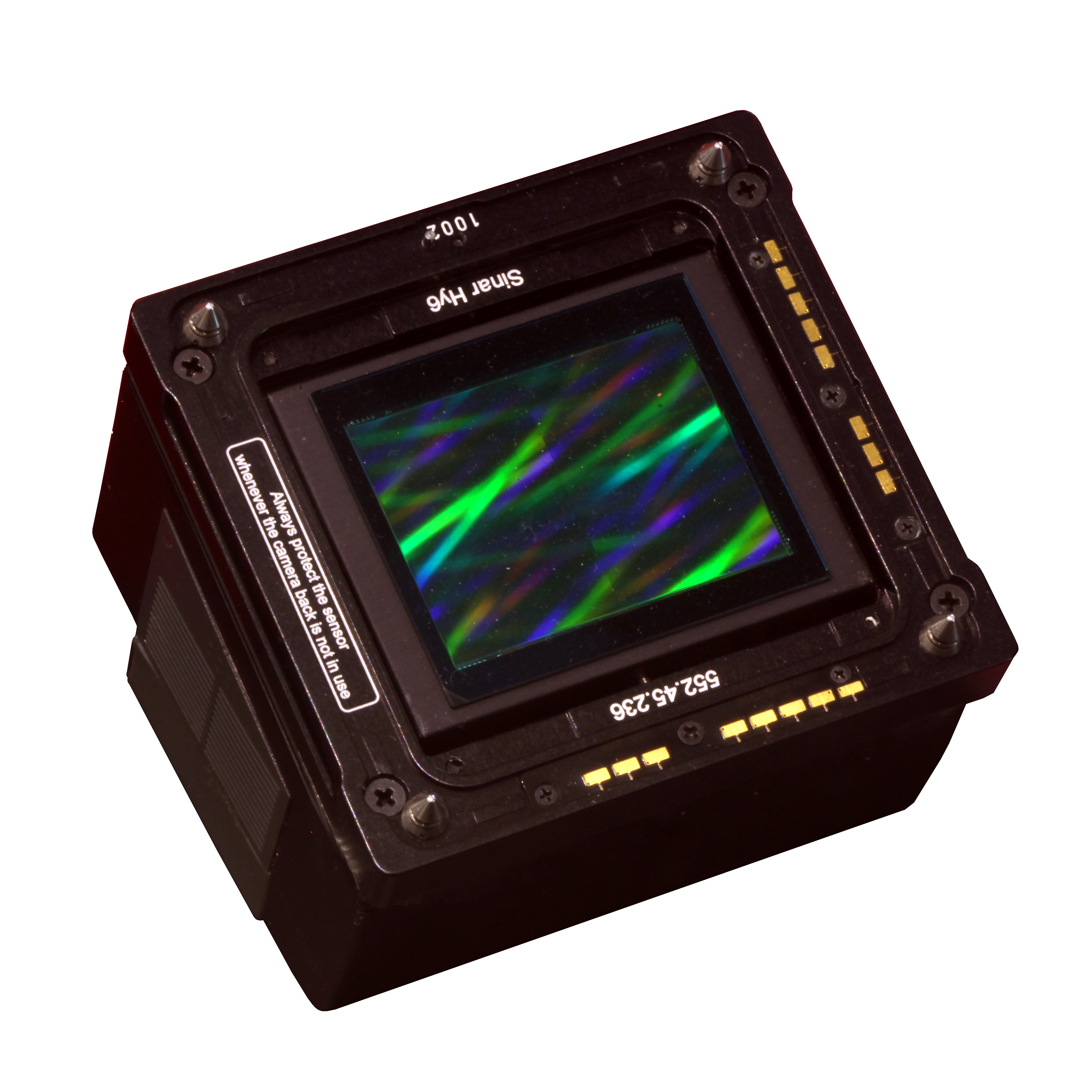
The 33 MP Sinar eVolution 75 medium format digital back

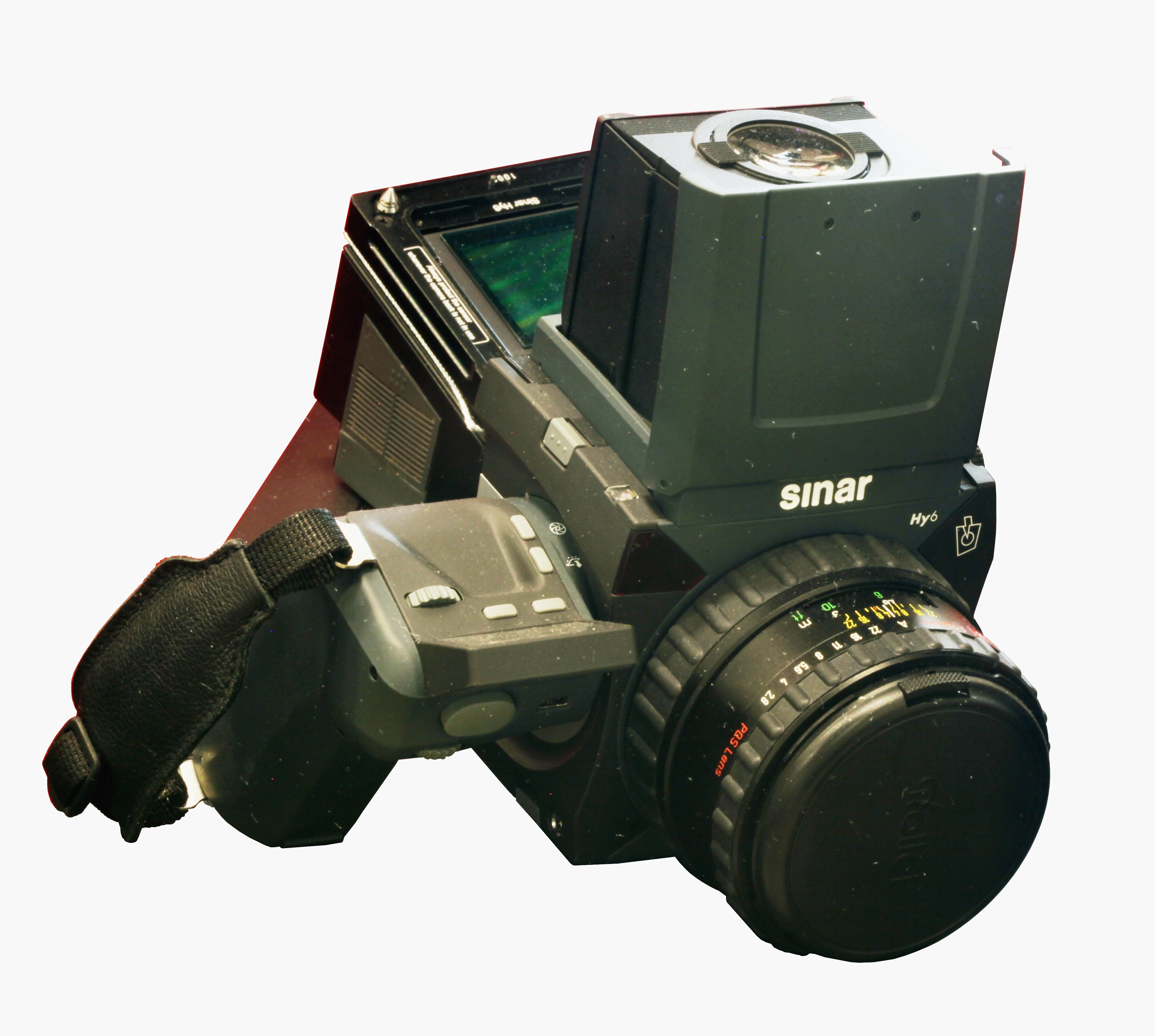
Sinar Hy6
