= Bellows (photography) =

Expandable part of a camera

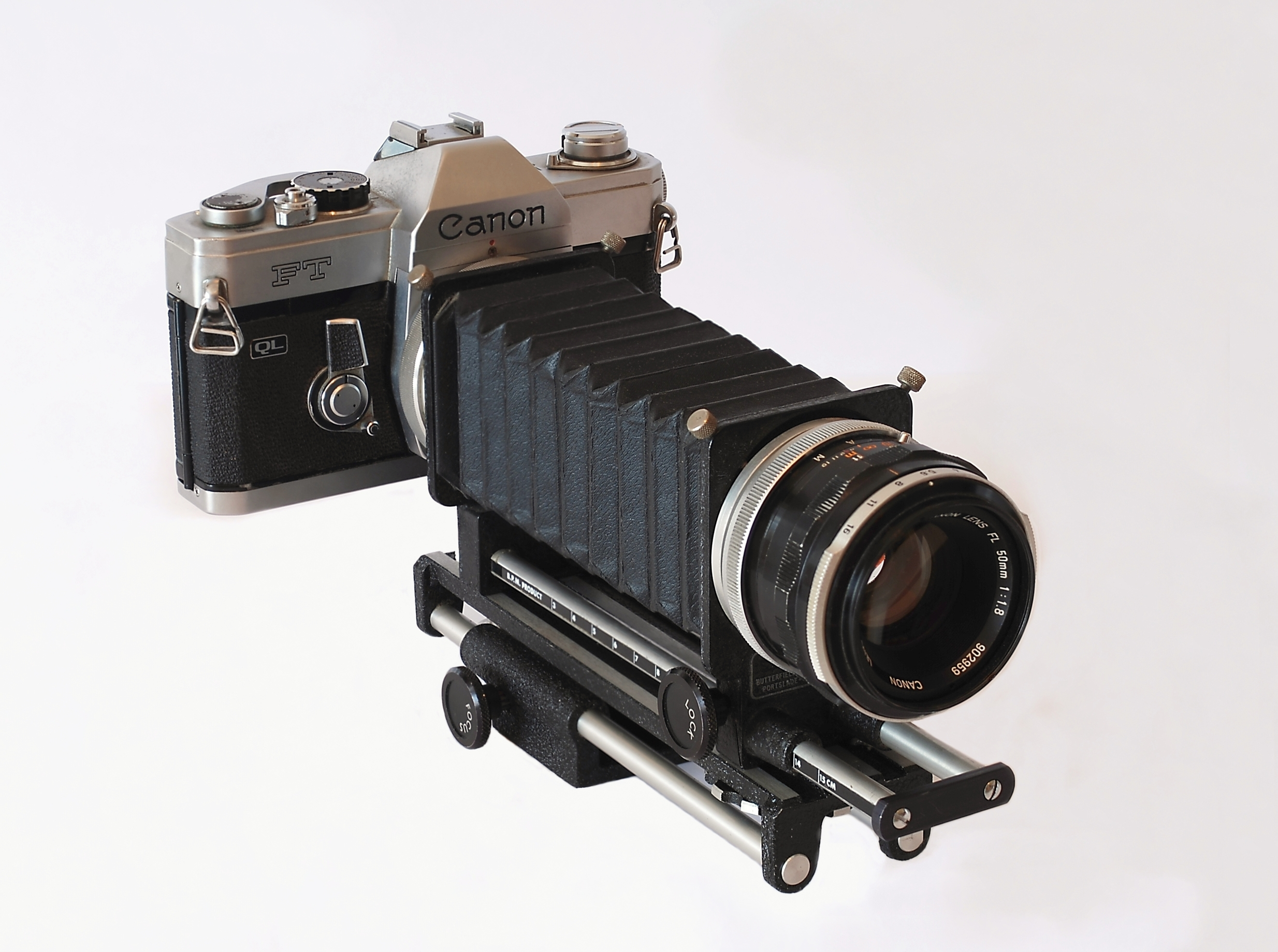
A macrophotography bellows mounted on a Canon FT QL (1966)

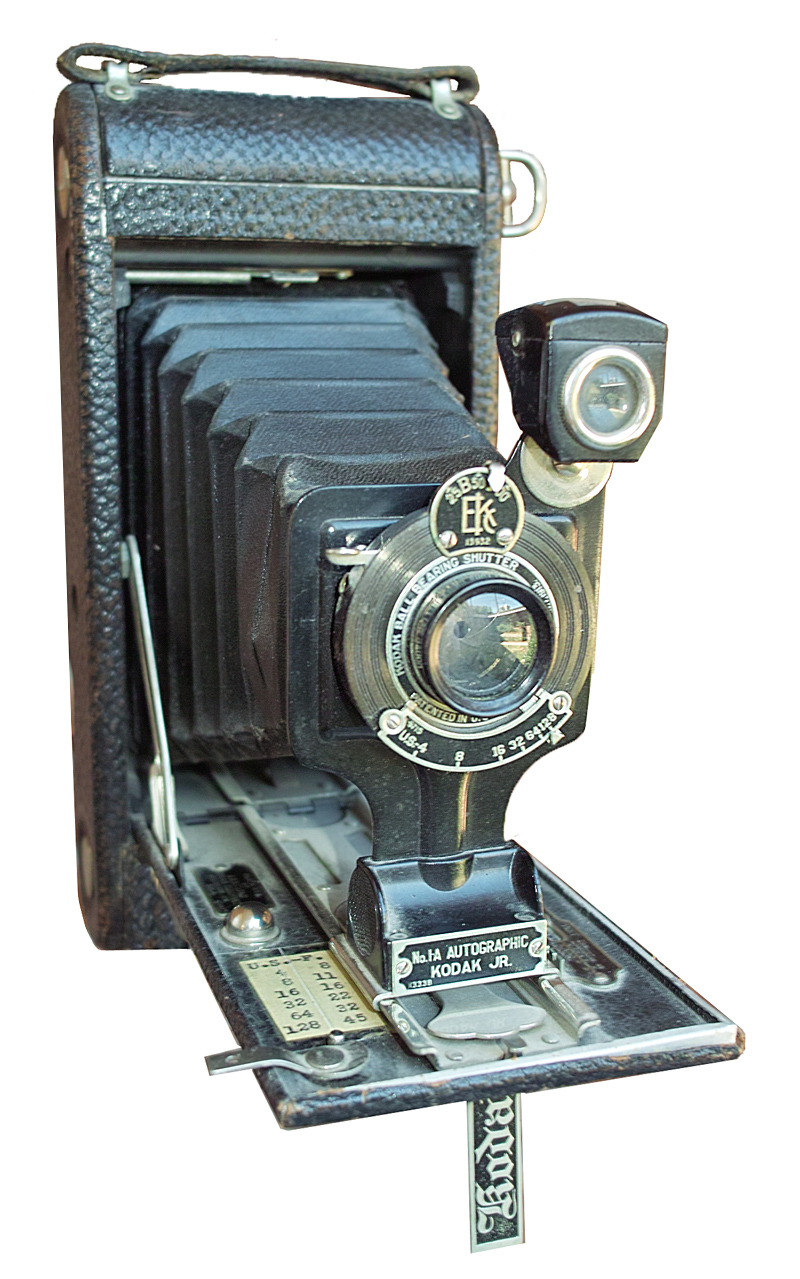
A folding Kodak camera with bellows

In photography, a bellows is the accordion-like, pleated expandable part of a camera, usually a large or medium format camera, to allow the lens to be moved with respect to the focal plane for focusing. Bellows are also used on enlargers. The bellows provides a flexible, dark extension between the film plane and the lens.

== History ==
French inventor Joseph Nicéphore Niépce was one of the first to apply the bellows to photographic instruments.

== Classification ==
Two kinds of bellows are commonly used on cameras; bag bellows are normally used with a lens of short focal length, and accordion bellows with a much longer range of extension.

For large format cameras, “double extension” refers to bellows that extend to a length equal to about twice the focal length of a standard lens, e.g. 300 mm for the 4×5 inch format. “Triple extension” for the same format indicates bellows extension of 450 to 500 mm.

== Flexibility ==
Bellows allow movements that can be used to correct distortion in a photograph and to avoid converging or diverging verticals. Use of a bellows-based camera can ensure that parallel elements in a scene remain parallel in the final photograph.

In some cameras, the photographer can change the angle of the film plate with respect to the optical axis of the lens, providing alterations of perspective distortion and of the object plane of focus. Bellows may be part of a camera or come as an optional accessory.

== See also ==
- View camera
- Macro photography
- Chromophotography
