= Kodak Z712 IS ZOOM digital camera =

Kodak Z712 IS
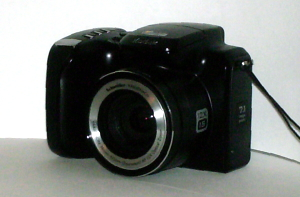

Overview
- Maker: Kodak
- Type: "Bridge" digital camera

Sensor/medium
- Maximum resolution: 7.1 megapixels
- Film speed: ISO 64-1600 (3200 in 1.0 megapixel mode.)

Viewfinder
- Viewfinder: Electronic & 2.5 " LCD

The Kodak Z712 IS ZOOM digital camera is a high-end consumer digital camera.
It features a 12× optical Schneider-Kreuznach zoom lens.

The Kodak Z712 is the successor to the popular Z612 which was the model before it. The Kodak Z712 is in a class of cameras known as "Super Zooms." The Z712 features 12× zoom. Along with that it comes with manual options to adjust the shutter speed and aperture.
