= QBM =

Lens mount for Rolleiflex SL35 cameras

Quick Bayonet Mount (QBM)
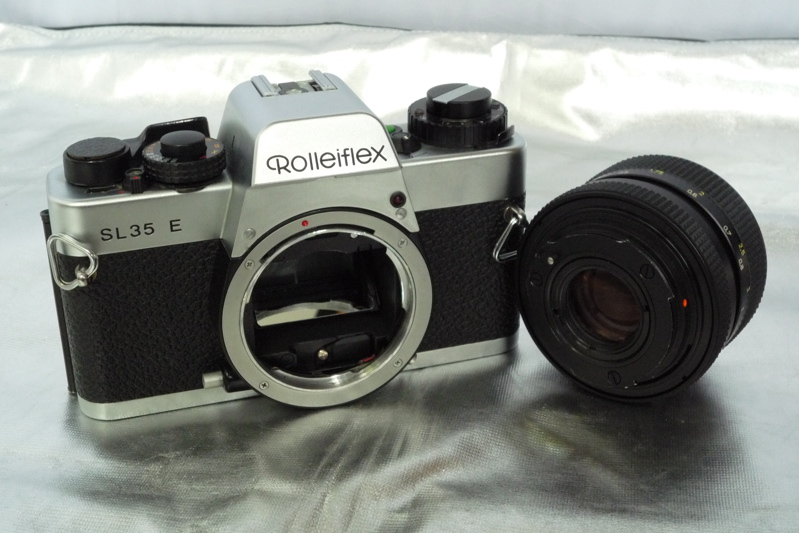
- Rolleiflex SL35 E, showing flange and dismounted lens
- Type: Bayonet
- Tabs: 3
- Flange: 44.5 mm
- Connectors: automatic diaphragm
- Introduced: 1970

The Quick Bayonet Mount (QBM) is the bayonet mount system for the range of interchangeable lenses fitted to 135 film cameras built by Rollei in Germany and Singapore from 1970 through 1990, including the Rolleiflex SL35, Rolleiflex SL2000F, and Voigtländer VSL series. Lens brands sold with QBM included Carl Zeiss, Rolleinar, Schneider, and Voigtländer. QBM has a flange focal distance of 44.5 mm.

== Technical ==
The aperture ring should be set to its maximum position (smallest f/-number) before mounting on the camera. The depth-of-field preview should not be engaged during the mounting/dismounting process.

== List of QBM lenses ==
Interchangeable QBM lenses for 35mm SLR cameras
FL (mm)	Aperture	Brand	Name	Construction		Focus	Dimensions			Filter	Notes & Refs.
FL (mm)	Aperture	Brand	Name	Ele	Grp	Focus	L	Φ	Wt.	Filter	Notes & Refs.
Fisheye lenses
14	f/3.5–16	Rollei	F-Rolleinar MC	10	7	0.3 m (1 ft 0 in)	56 mm (2.2 in)	64 mm (2.5 in)	320 g (11 oz)	built-in	full-frame fisheye lens
16	f/2.8–16	Zeiss	HFT F-Distagon	8	7	0.3 m (1 ft 0 in)	68 mm (2.7 in)	70 mm (2.8 in)	345 g (12.2 oz)	built-in	full-frame fisheye lens
Ultra wide angle lenses
15	f/3.5–22	Zeiss	HFT Distagon	13	12	0.16 m (6.3 in)	104 mm (4.1 in)	84 mm (3.3 in)	760 g (27 oz)	built-in	
18	f/4–22	Zeiss	HFT Distagon	10	9	0.3 m (1 ft 0 in)	61 mm (2.4 in)	70 mm (2.8 in)	300 g (11 oz)	slip-on, 70 mm	
21	f/4–16	Rollei	Rolleinar MC	9	8	0.45 m (1 ft 6 in)	56 mm (2.2 in)	63 mm (2.5 in)	245 g (8.6 oz)	58 mm	
Wide angle lenses
25	f/2.8–22	Zeiss	HFT Distagon	8	7	0.25 m (9.8 in)	64 mm (2.5 in)	62 mm (2.4 in)	310 g (11 oz)	49 mm	
25	f/2.8–22	Voigtländer	Color-Skoparex	8	7	0.25 m (9.8 in)	64 mm (2.5 in)	62 mm (2.4 in)	310 g (11 oz)	49 mm	Identical to HFT Distagon
28	f/2–22	Zeiss	HFT Distagon	9	8	0.3 m (1 ft 0 in)	83 mm (3.3 in)	63 mm (2.5 in)	471 g (16.6 oz)	55 mm	Floating element design
28	f/2.8–16	Rollei	Rolleinar MC (Note: Part of the Rolleinar RS series, which were available in multiple mounts, including QBM, Canon FD, Minolta SR, Pentax K, Nikon F, and Olympus OM.)	7	7	0.3 m (1 ft 0 in)	52 mm (2.0 in)	63 mm (2.5 in)	245 g (8.6 oz)	58 mm	
28	f/2.8–22	Rollei	HFT Rolleinar	8	7	0.3 m (1 ft 0 in)	40 mm (1.6 in)	63 mm (2.5 in)	200 g (7.1 oz)	52 mm	
35	f/1.4–16	Zeiss	HFT Distagon	9	8	0.26 m (10 in)	85 mm (3.3 in)	70 mm (2.8 in)	470 g (17 oz)	67 mm	Floating element design
35	f/2.8–22	Zeiss	HFT Distagon	5	5	0.4 m (1 ft 4 in)	53 mm (2.1 in)	62 mm (2.4 in)	210 g (7.4 oz)	49 mm	
35	f/2.8–22	Voigtländer	Color-Skoparex	5	5	0.4 m (1 ft 4 in)	53 mm (2.1 in)	62 mm (2.4 in)	210 g (7.4 oz)	49 mm	Identical to HFT Distagon
35	f/2.8–16	Rollei	Rolleinar MC	7	5	0.4 m (1 ft 4 in)	60 mm (2.4 in)	63 mm (2.5 in)	235 g (8.3 oz)	52 mm	
35	f/2.8–22	Schneider	SL Angulon	7	6	0.3 m (1 ft 0 in)	46.5 mm (1.83 in)	62 mm (2.4 in)	210 g (7 1/4 oz)	49 mm	
35	f/4–22	Schneider	PC-Curtagon HFT	7	6	0.3 m (1 ft 0 in)	56 mm (2.2 in)	63 mm (2.5 in)	290 g (10 oz)	49 mm	Includes shift function
Normal lenses
50	f/1.4–16	Zeiss	HFT Planar	7	6	0.45 m (1 ft 6 in)	47 mm (1.9 in)	62 mm (2.4 in)	230 g (8.1 oz)	49 mm	
50	f/1.4–16	Voigtländer	Color-Ultron	7	6	0.45 m (1 ft 6 in)	47 mm (1.9 in)	62 mm (2.4 in)	230 g (8.1 oz)	49 mm	Identical to HFT Planar
50	f/1.8–16	Zeiss	HFT Planar	7	6	0.45 m (1 ft 6 in)	47 mm (1.9 in)	62 mm (2.4 in)	185 g (6.5 oz)	49 mm	
50	f/1.8–16	Voigtländer	Color-Ultron	7	6	0.45 m (1 ft 6 in)	47 mm (1.9 in)	62 mm (2.4 in)	185 g (6.5 oz)	49 mm	Identical to HFT Planar
50	f/1.8–16	Schneider	SL Xenon	6	4	0.45 m (1 ft 6 in)	47 mm (1.9 in)	62 mm (2.4 in)	230 g (8 1/8 oz)	49 mm	
50	f/3.5–22	Rollei	Rolleinar Macro	5	4	0.22 m (8.7 in)	52 mm (2.0 in)	64.5 mm (2.54 in)	205 g (7.2 oz)	49 mm	
55	f/1.4–16	Rollei	Rolleinar MC	7	5	0.45 m (1 ft 6 in)	52 mm (2.0 in)	63 mm (2.5 in)	270 g (9.5 oz)	52 mm-->	
60	f/2.8–22	Zeiss	HFT S-Planar Macro	6	4	0.27 m (11 in)	70 mm (2.8 in)	68 mm (2.7 in)	570 g (20 oz)	55 mm	
Portrait lenses
85	f/1.4–16	Zeiss	HFT Planar	6	5	1 m (3 ft 3 in)	72 mm (2.8 in)	70 mm (2.8 in)	535 g (18.9 oz)	67 mm	
85	f/2.8–22	Zeiss	HFT Sonnar	4	4	1 m (3 ft 3 in)	52 mm (2.0 in)	62 mm (2.4 in)	195 g (6.9 oz)	49 mm	
85	f/2.8–22	Voigtländer	Color-Dynarex	4	4	1 m (3 ft 3 in)	52 mm (2.0 in)	62 mm (2.4 in)	195 g (6.9 oz)	49 mm	Identical to HFT Sonnar
85	f/2.8–16	Rollei	Rolleinar MC	4	4	0.85 m (2 ft 9 in)	64 mm (2.5 in)	63 mm (2.5 in)	270 g (9.5 oz)	52 mm	
105	f/2.8–16	Rollei	Rolleinar MC	4	4	1.2 m (3 ft 11 in)	69 mm (2.7 in)	63 mm (2.5 in)	230 g (8.1 oz)	52 mm	
105	f/2.8–32	Rollei	HFT Rolleinar Macro	6	6	0.35 m (1 ft 2 in)	103 mm (4.1 in)	72 mm (2.8 in)	650 g (23 oz)	55 mm	
135	f/2.8–22	Zeiss	HFT Sonnar	4	4	1.6 m (5 ft 3 in)	98 mm (3.9 in)	62 mm (2.4 in)	450 g (16 oz)	55 mm	
135	f/2.8–22	Voigtländer	Color-Dynarex	4	4	1.6 m (5 ft 3 in)	98 mm (3.9 in)	62 mm (2.4 in)	450 g (16 oz)	55 mm	Identical to HFT Sonnar
135	f/2.8–22	Rollei	Rolleinar MC	4	4	1.5 m (4 ft 11 in)	97 mm (3.8 in)	66 mm (2.6 in)	505 g (17.8 oz)	52 mm	
135	f/3.5–22	Schneider	SL Tele-Xenar	5	5	1.5 m (5 ft)	84 mm (3.3 in)	62 mm (2.4 in)	380 g (13 1/2 oz)	49 mm	
135	f/4–32	Zeiss	HFT Tele-Tessar	4	4	1.6 m (5 ft 3 in)	98 mm (3.9 in)	62 mm (2.4 in)	375 g (13.2 oz)	49 mm	
135	f/4–32	Voigtländer	Color-Dynarex	4	4	1.6 m (5 ft 3 in)	98 mm (3.9 in)	62 mm (2.4 in)	375 g (13.2 oz)	49 mm	Identical to HFT Tele-Tessar
Telephoto lenses
200	f/3.5–22	Rollei	Rolleinar MC	4	4	2.3 m (7 ft 7 in)	147 mm (5.8 in)	71 mm (2.8 in)	590 g (21 oz)	58 mm	
200	f/4–32	Zeiss	HFT Tele-Tessar	6	5	2.5 m (8 ft 2 in)	134 mm (5.3 in)	76 mm (3.0 in)	580 g (20 oz)	67 mm	
200	f/4–32	Voigtländer	Color-Dynarex	6	5	2.5 m (8 ft 2 in)	134 mm (5.3 in)	76 mm (3.0 in)	580 g (20 oz)	67 mm	Identical to HFT Tele-Tessar
400	f/5.6–22	Rollei	Rolleinar MC	8	5	4 m (13 ft)	216 mm (8.5 in)	78 mm (3.1 in)	950 g (34 oz)	72 mm	
500	f/4.5	Zeiss	HFT Mirotar	5	5	3.5 m (11 ft)	235 mm (9.3 in)	193 mm (7.6 in)	4,500 g (160 oz)	turret	Special order
500	f/8	Rollei	Reflex Rolleinar MC	7	2	1.5 m (4 ft 11 in)	95 mm (3.7 in)	78 mm (3.1 in)	500 g (18 oz)	33.5 mm	Catadioptric design
1000	f/5.6	Zeiss	HFT Mirotar	5	5	12 m (39 ft)	420 mm (17 in)	250 mm (9.8 in)	16,500 g (580 oz)	turret	Special order
1000	f/8–64	Zeiss	HFT Tele-Tessar	4	4	14.5 m (48 ft)	825 mm (32.5 in)	218 mm (8.6 in)	8,800 g (310 oz)	Bayonet VI	Special order
Zoom lenses
28~105	f/3.2~4.5–22	Rollei	HFT Rolleinar	15	11	0.25 m (9.8 in)	112.5 mm (4.43 in)	70 mm (2.8 in)	686 g (24.2 oz)	67 mm	
35~105	f/3.5–16	Rollei	Zoom-Rolleinar MC	13	11	1.5 m (4 ft 11 in)	108 mm (4.3 in)	75 mm (3.0 in)	750 g (26 oz)	72 mm	
35~105	f/3.5~4.3–22	Rollei	Zoom-Rolleinar MC	16	13	1.6 m (5 ft 3 in)	96 mm (3.8 in)	64 mm (2.5 in)	445 g (15.7 oz)	55 mm	
50~250	f/4~5.6–22	Rollei	HFT Rolleinar	14	11	1.8 m (5 ft 11 in)	179 mm (7.0 in)	68 mm (2.7 in)	720 g (25 oz)	55 mm	
75~150	f/3.9–22	Rollei	Zoom-Rolleinar MC	9	?	2 m (6 ft 7 in)	125 mm (4.9 in)	65.4 mm (2.57 in)	578 g (20.4 oz)	58 mm	
80~200	f/2.8–32	Rollei	HFT Rolleinar	17	11	1.8 m (5 ft 11 in)	174.5 mm (6.87 in)	81 mm (3.2 in)	1,080 g (38 oz)	77 mm	
80~200	f/4–22	Rollei	Zoom-Rolleinar MC	12	9	1.9 m (6 ft 3 in)	141 mm (5.6 in)	65 mm (2.6 in)	570 g (20 oz)	55 mm	
80~200	f/4–32	Rollei	Zoom-Rolleinar MC	13	9	1 m (3 ft 3 in)	140.5 mm (5.53 in)	67.8 mm (2.67 in)	655 g (23.1 oz)	55 mm	
