= Rolleiflex SL35 =

SLR cameras from Rolleiflex

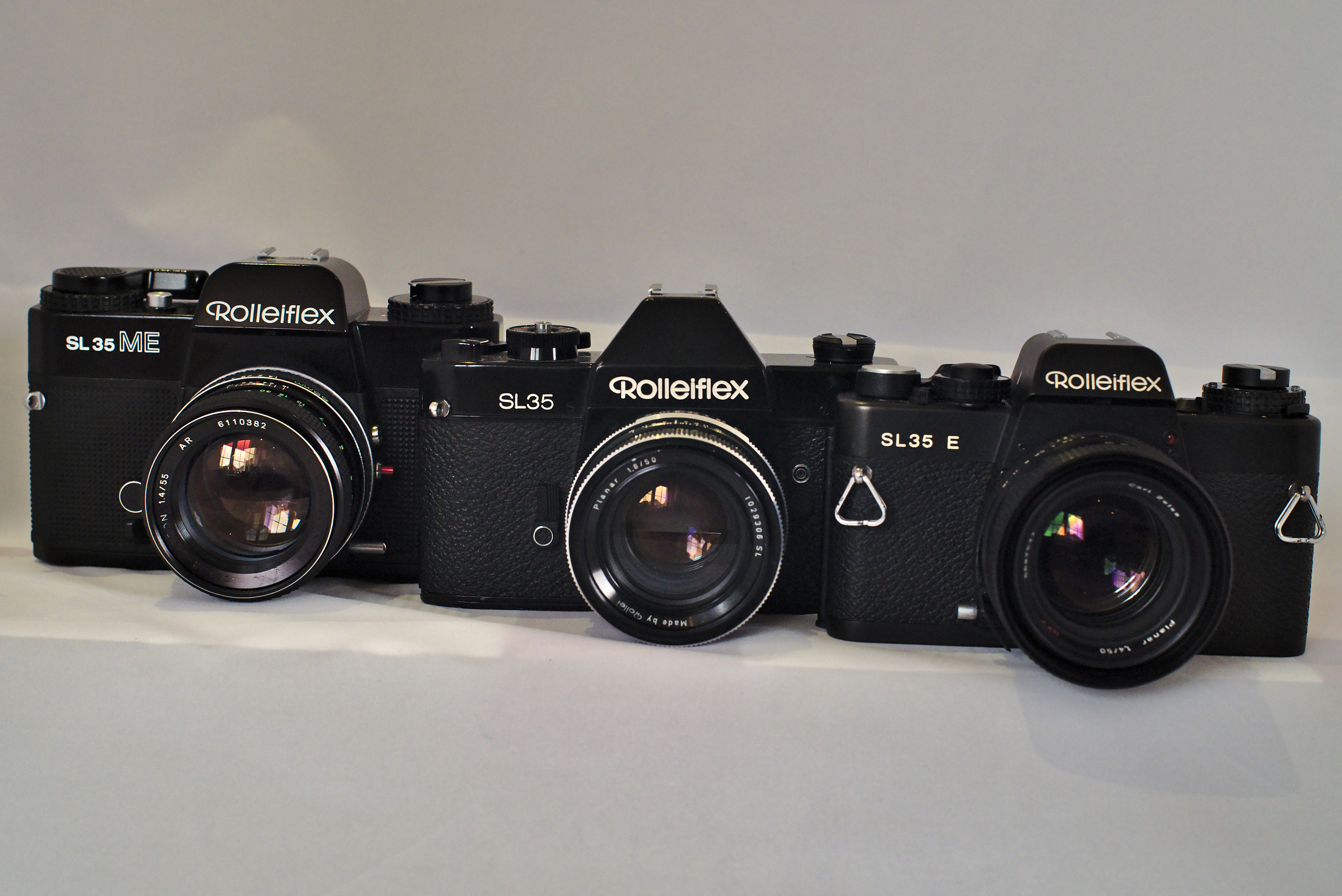
- L–R: Rolleiflex SL35 ME, SL35, and SL35 E

Overview
- Maker: Rollei
- Type: 35mm single-lens reflex camera
- Released: 1970 Rolleiflex SL35; 1974 Rolleiflex SL350; 1976 SL35M, SL35ME; 1978 SL35 E
- Production: 1970-1982

Lens
- Lens mount: QBM (Quick Bayonet Mount)

Sensor/medium
- Recording medium: 135 film

Focusing
- Focus: manual

Exposure/metering
- Exposure: TTL exposure

Flash
- Flash: hot shoe

General
- Made in: Germany, Singapore

The Rolleiflex SL35 is a range of SLR cameras manufactured and sold by the German camera maker Rollei from 1970 to 1982. This range of cameras uses 35mm film. The camera bodies were initially made in Germany. After Zeiss Ikon discontinued camera production, Rollei acquired the Voigtländer brand and camera designs in 1972, and began producing a second generation of SLR cameras in Singapore starting from 1976. Some of those second-generation cameras were rebranded and marketed as Voigtländer VSL.

The Rolleiflex SL35 line uses QBM (Quick Bayonet Mount) mount, with a flange focal distance of 44.5 mm. The QBM was re-used by Rollei for the Rolleiflex SL2000F (1981) and successor 3003 (1985), which were modular 135 film SLR cameras similar in concept and execution to contemporary Hasselblad V-system and Rolleiflex SL66/6006 cameras.

== History ==
=== First generation cameras ===
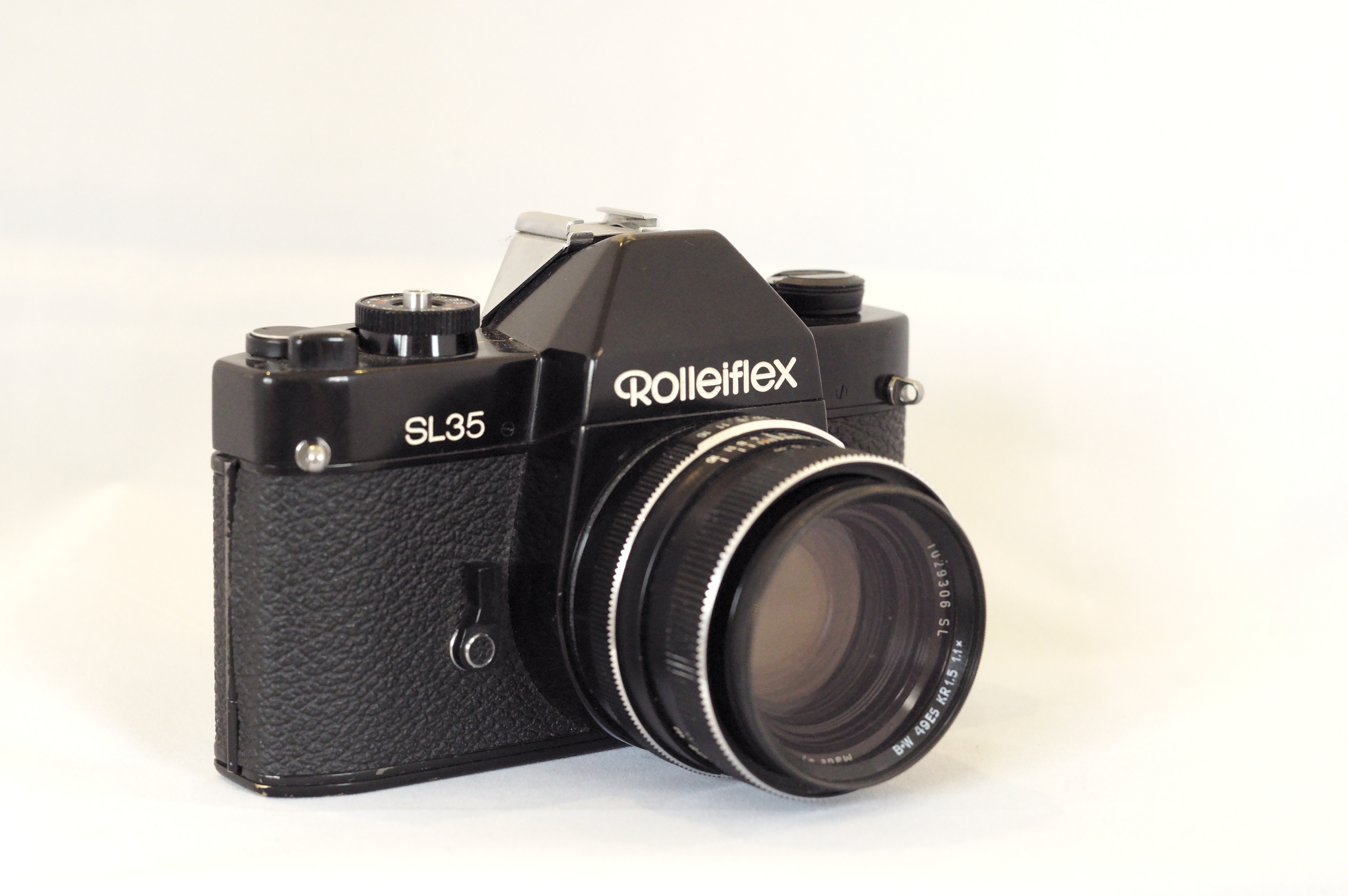
Rolleiflex SL35 (black) with 50 mm f/1.8 Planar lens

The Rolleiflex SL35 was a line of 35mm SLR cameras which were developed and built by Rollei from the 1970s until the 1990s. The first camera in the range was the SL35, released in 1970 as the first 35mm SLR produced by Rollei. Compared to its competitors at that time, it was relatively small and light.

The Rolleiflex SL35 was the second Rollei SLR camera to be equipped with Carl Zeiss lenses, after the SL66 of 1966. Lenses were designed by Zeiss and manufactured by Rollei under license with Rollei's High Fidelity Transfer (HFT) multicoating as an alternative to the Zeiss T* process. As initially introduced, the SL35 also was available with Schneider Kreuznach lenses as a less expensive alternative. An adapter for automatic-diaphragm M42 lens mount interchangeable lenses for Praktica and Pentax was available as an accessory for photographers migrating from the earlier system.

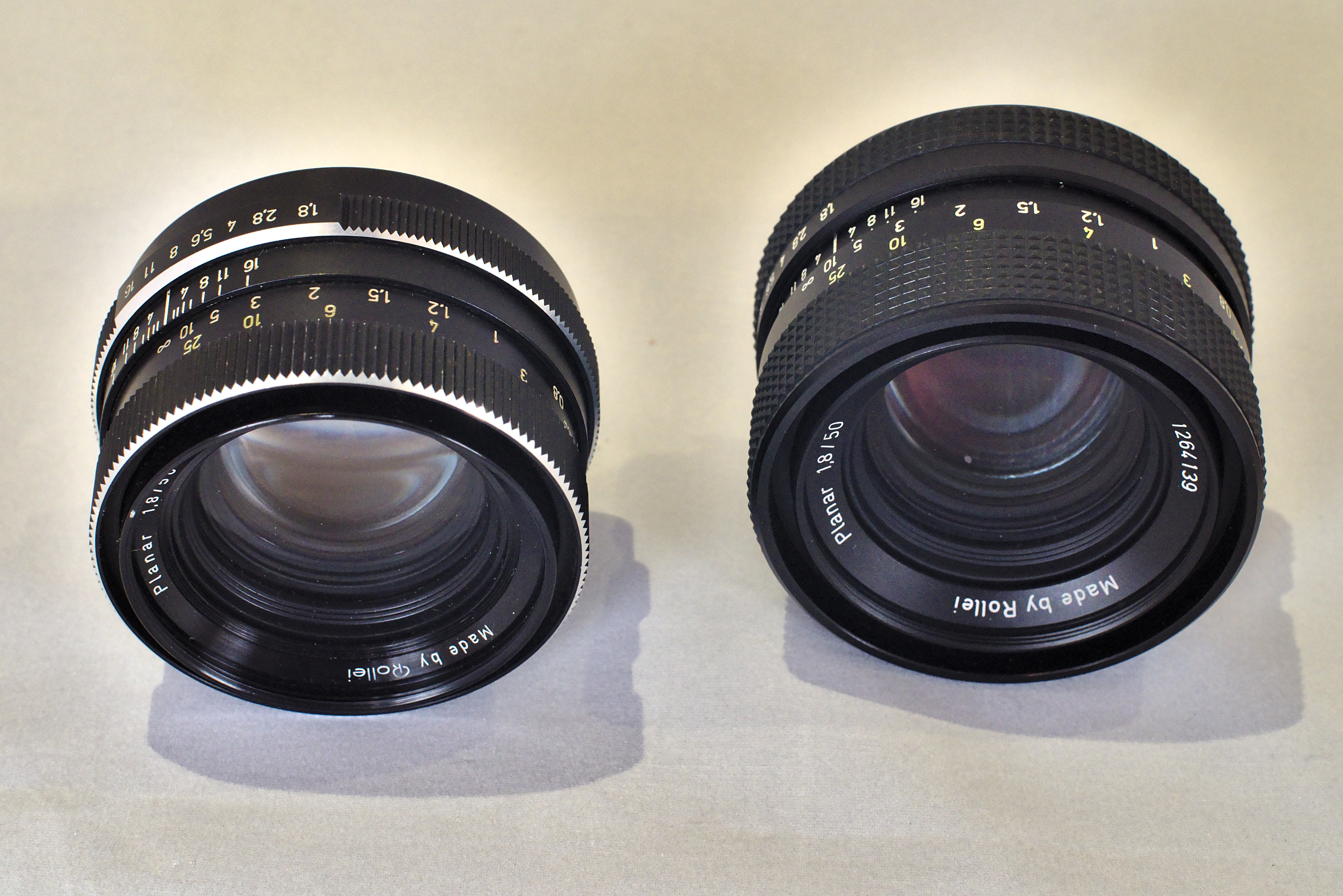
Zeiss-designed Planar lenses built by Rollei: (L) earlier version, with metal focus ring; (R) later production, with plastic focus ring

After the Zeiss Ikon camera company declared bankruptcy in the early 1970s, Rollei acquired the Voigtländer brand in 1972 along with several camera designs, including the SL 706, an M42 lens mount camera that was derived from the earlier Icarex 35S and was intended to unify the diverse SLR lines offered by Zeiss Ikon. The SL 706 was produced for only one year and is not commonly found.

Two years later, in 1974, Rollei produced the Rolleiflex SL350. Compared to the original SL35, the Rolleiflex SL350 had open-aperture metering; the earlier Rolleiflex SL35 was built with a stop down light meter, which required the photographer to take an extra step and close the aperture to take an appropriate meter reading. A mechanical connector was added to the QBM lens mount to enable the fully-automatic aperture; some early lenses for the SL35 lacked this additional interface and must be stopped down to meter with newer bodies.

=== Second generation ===
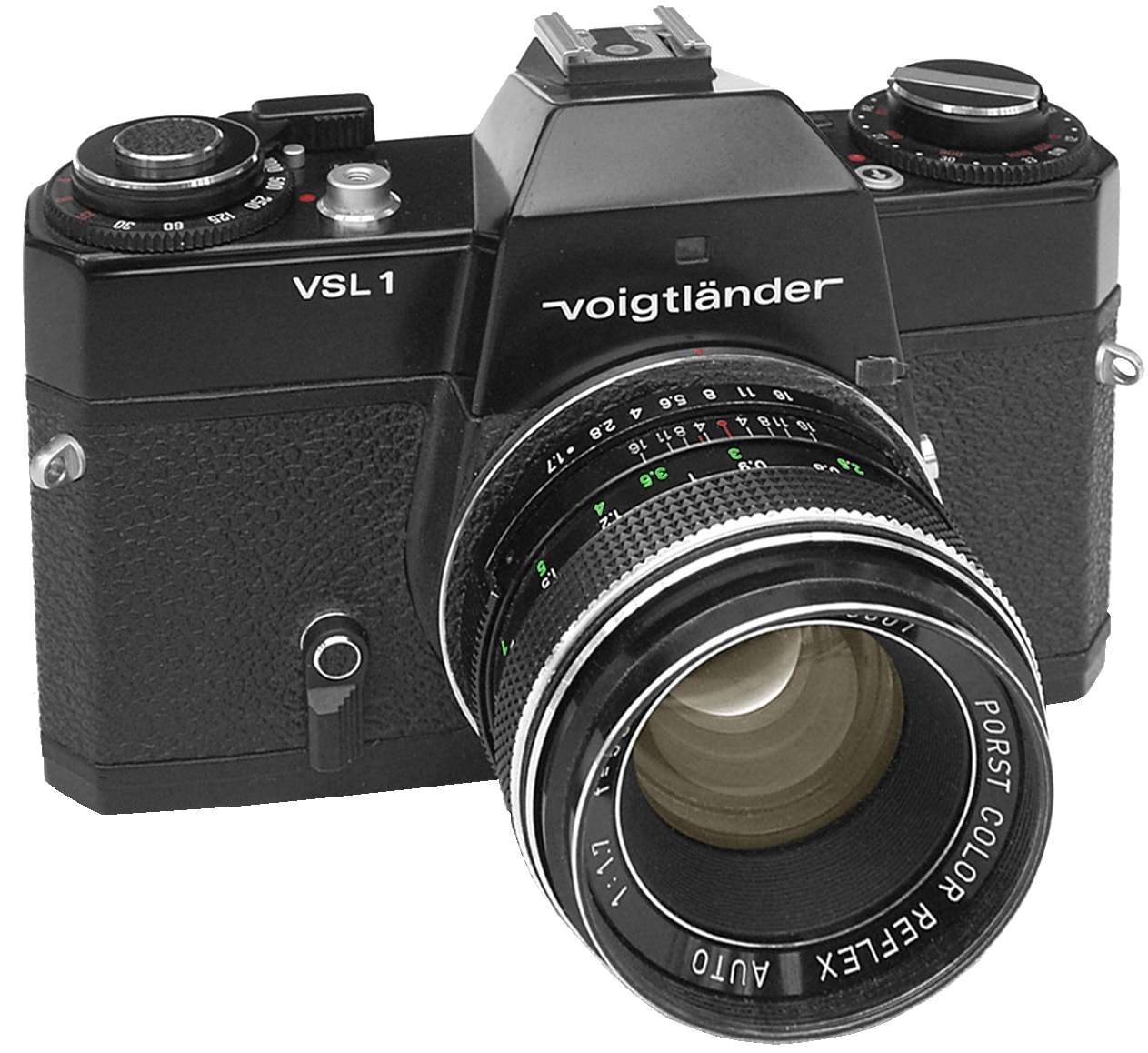
Voigtländer VSL 1 (M42 version; QBM version cosmetically identical)

In 1976, Rollei introduced its second generation models, the SL35M and SL35ME. These used a visibly different body based on the earlier Icarex 35S / SL 706 design but with plastic top and baseplates and offered nothing technologically radical. The SL35M was a fully-mechanical (aside from the meter) camera equivalent to the SL350; the viewfinder offered aperture and metering information, but not shutter speed. A rebadged version of the SL35M was sold as the Voigtländer VSL 1, which was offered with both M42 and QBM lens mounts.

At the same time, a variant of the SL35M, the SL35ME, was also released. Built on the same body, the SL35ME had electronic shutter control inside and could set shutter speeds automatically with a selectable aperture-priority autoexposure mode. The viewfinder also came with a whole range of indicators including aperture and shutter speed amongst others. Similar to the SL35M, a rebadged version of the SL35ME was sold as the Voigtländer VSL 2, offered in QBM only.

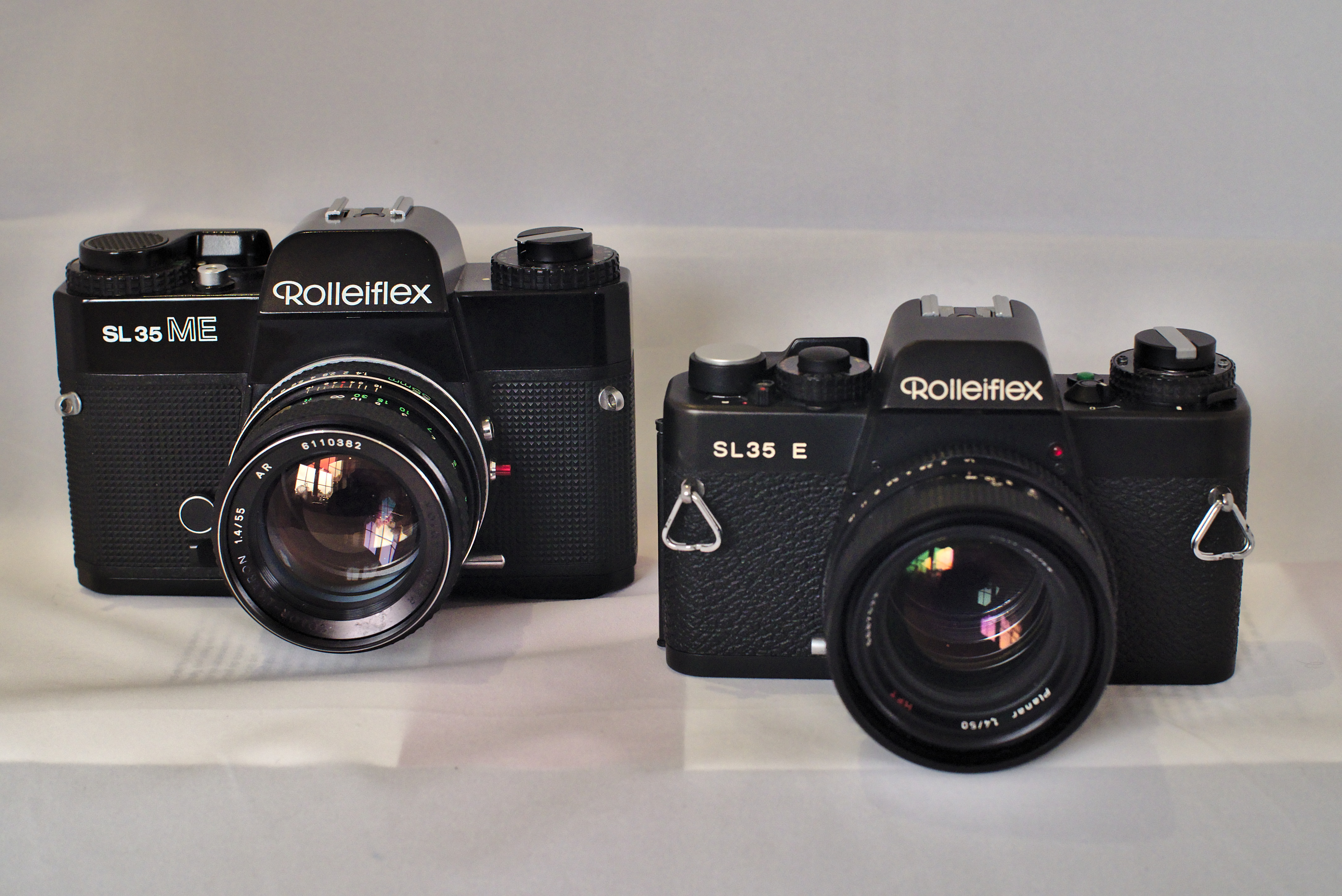
Rolleiflex SL35 ME (L) and SL35 E (R)

Two years later, in 1978, the SL35 E was introduced. It had all the functions of the SL35ME but was smaller and lighter, at 807 g (28.5 oz) for the camera body with lens; by comparison, the SL35 M and ME weighed 895 g (31.6 oz). A nearly-identical body, sharing most components from the same production lines, was sold by Voigtländer as the VSL 3E; they shared the same QBM lens mount, so lenses and bodies from both ranges could be used interchangeably. The SL35 E used a vertical-travel bladed metal shutter which was designed for the SL2000.

=== Later development ===
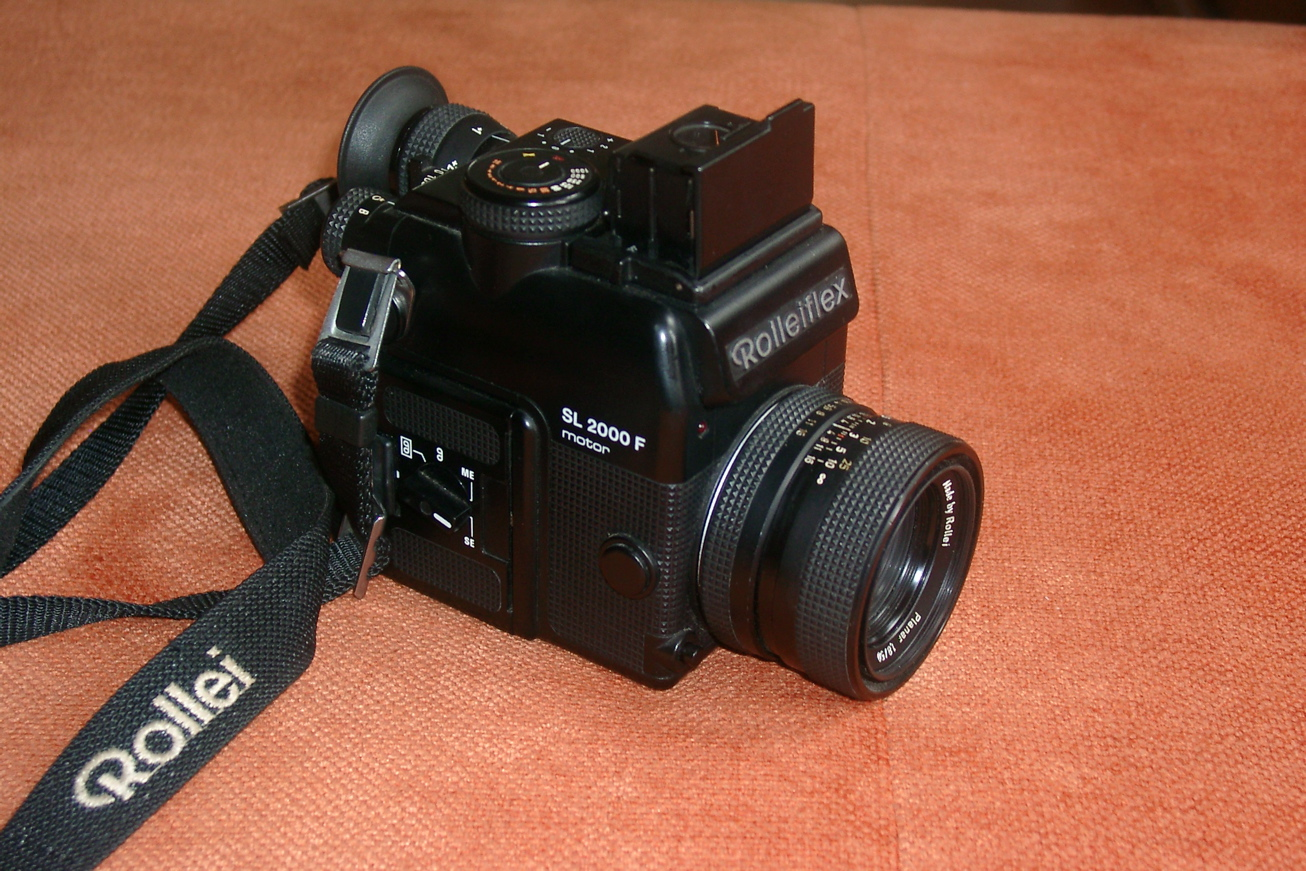
Rolleiflex SL 2000 F

The SL35 line was discontinued in the early 1980s, but the QBM lens mount continued with the Rolleiflex SL2000F, a camera system that accepted interchangeable film magazines and was equipped with dual viewfinders (waist-level and eye-level), similar in concept to professional system SLRs like the Rollei SL66 and Hasselblad, scaled down for 135 film. The prototype SL2000F first was introduced at photokina 1976, but the camera was not available for purchase until 1981. The SL2000F was succeeded by the improved 3003 by 1985.

Rolleiflex SL35 cameras
Name	Image	Production	Shutter		Dimensions (incl. 50 mm f/1.8 lens)		Battery	Variants
Name	Image	Production	Type	Speeds	Size	Weight	Battery	Variants
SL35		1970–1976	Focal Plane rubber cloth curtain	1 – 1/1000s, B	140 mm × 92 mm × 87 mm (5 1/2 in × 3 5/8 in × 3 7/16 in)	780 g (27 3/8 oz)	1× EPX 625	Chrome, made in Germany; Black, made in Germany; Chrome, made in Singapore; Black, made in Singapore
SL350		1974–1976	Focal Plane rubber cloth curtain	1 – 1/1000s, B			1× EPX 625	Black, made in Germany; Chrome, made in Germany
SL35M		1976–1980	Focal Plane	1/2 - 1/1000s, B	146 mm × 92 mm × 99 mm (5.7 in × 3.6 in × 3.9 in)	895 g (31.6 oz)	1× EPX 625	Black, made in Singapore
SL35ME		1976–1980	Focal Plane rubber cloth curtain	4 – 1/1000s (auto); 1/30 – 1/1000s + B (manual)	146 mm × 92 mm × 99 mm (5.7 in × 3.6 in × 3.9 in)	895 g (31.6 oz)	4× SR44	Black, made in Singapore
SL35 E		1978–1982	Focal Plane vertical metal plates	16 – 1/1000s, B	135 mm × 87 mm × 89 mm (5.3 in × 3.4 in × 3.5 in)	807 g (28.5 oz)	1× PX 28	Black, made in Singapore; Chrome, made in Singapore

== Lenses ==
A whole range of lenses were made for the QBM interchangeable lens mount system fitted to the Rolleiflex SL35 and Voigtländer VSL series cameras. Lens brands manufactured for the QBM system included German-made Carl Zeiss, Rollei, Rolleinar, Schneider, and Voigtländer.

=== Carl Zeiss ===
- 15/3.5 Distagon
- 16/2.8 F-Distagon, fisheye
- 18/4 Distagon
- 25/2.8 Distagon = Color-Skoparex
- 28/2 Distagon
- 35/1.4 Distagon [triangular aperture]
- 35/2.8 Distagon = Color-Skoparex
- 50/1.4 Planar
- 50/1.8 Planar = Color-Ultron
- 60/2.8 Macro-Planar
- 85/1.4 Planar [triangular aperture]
- 85/2.8 Sonnar = Color-Dynarex
- 135/2.8 Sonnar = Color-Dynarex
- 135/4 Tele-Tessar = Color-Dynarex
- 200/4 Tele-Tessar = Color-Dynarex
- 500/4.5 Mirotar, mirror lens
- 1000/5.6 Mirotar, mirror lens
- 1000/8 Tele-Tessar

=== Schneider lens ===
- 35/2.8 Angulon
- 50/1.8 Xenon
- 135/3.5 Tele-Xenar
- 35/4 PC-Curtagon, special shift lens
- 28/2.8 PC-Super Angulon, special shift lens

=== Rolleinar ===
- 14/3.5 Fisheye
- 21/4
- 28/2.8
- 35/2.8
- 50/2
- 50/3.5 Macro
- 55/1.4
- 85/2.8
- 105/2.8
- 105/2.8 Macro
- 135/2.8
- 200/3.5
- 400/5.6
- 500/8 Reflex, mirror lens
- 28-80/3.5-4.5
- 28-85/4
- 28-105/3.2-4.5
- 35-105/3.5
- 35-105/3.5-4.3
- 50-250/4-5.6
- 70-210/3.5-4.5
- 80-200/2.8
- 80-200/4
- 2x converter

== See also ==
- Rollei
- Rolleiflex
