= Schneider Kreuznach =

German company

Jos. Schneider Optische Werke GmbH
- Formerly: Optische Anstalt Jos. Schneider & Co. (1913–1922); Jos. Schneider & Co., Optische Werke, Kreuznach (1922–1998)
- Type: Private
- Industry: Digital imaging
- Founded: December 28, 1912; 113 years ago, in Bad Kreuznach, Rhineland-Palatinate, Germany
- Headquarters: Ringstraße 132, 55543 Bad Kreuznach, Rhineland-Palatinate, Germany
- Products: Photographic lenses; Cinema projection lenses; Industrial optics; Precision mechanics
- Number of employees: 660 (group total)
- Subsidiaries: Pentacon (Dresden); ISK Optics (Göttingen); Schneider-Optics (New York, Los Angeles); Schneider Asia Pacific (Hong Kong); Schneider Optical Technologies (Shenzhen)
- Website: schneiderkreuznach.com/en/

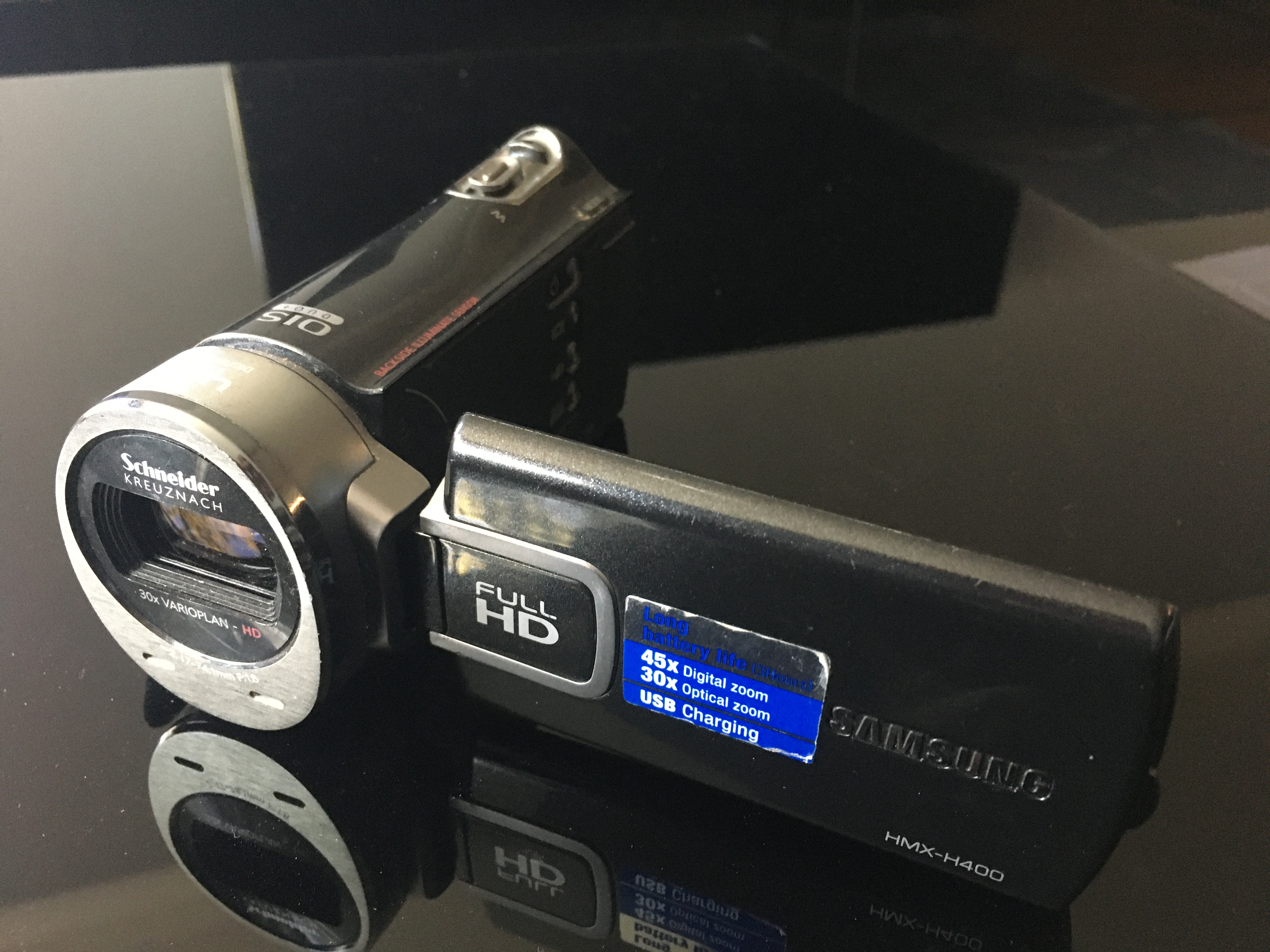
Samsung HD camcorder from 2012 with Schneider Varioplan zoom lens (30x)

Joseph Schneider Optische Werke GmbH (commonly referred to as Schneider) is a manufacturer of industrial and photographic optics. The company was founded on 28 December 1912 by Josef Schneider and Hermann Bauer as Optische Anstalt Jos. Schneider & Co. at Bad Kreuznach in Germany. The company changed its name to Jos. Schneider & Co., Optische Werke, Kreuznach in 1922, and to the current Jos. Schneider Optische Werke GmbH in 1998.

In 2001, Schneider received an Oscar for Technical Achievement for their Super-Cinelux motion picture lenses. It is best known as manufacturers of large format lenses for view cameras, enlarger lenses, and photographic loupes. It also makes a limited amount of small- and medium-format lenses, and has at various times manufactured eyeglasses and camera rangefinders, as well as being an OEM lens maker for Kodak and Samsung digital cameras. It has supplied the lenses for various LG devices and the BlackBerry Priv. It also supplied the lenses for the Kodak Regent camera in the 1930s and other classic cameras such as certain models of the Rolleiflex starting in the 1940s, the Kodak Retina and Kodak Retinette camera series in the 1950s and 1960s, and certain specialty lenses for Hasselblad. In 1961, it created Feinwerktechnik GmbH, a manufacturer of electrical-hydraulic servo valves.

In recent years, it has acquired several other companies:

- In 1985, it acquired the B+W Filter Manufacturing Company (founded in 1947 by partners Biermann and Weber), maker of the line of B+W filters.
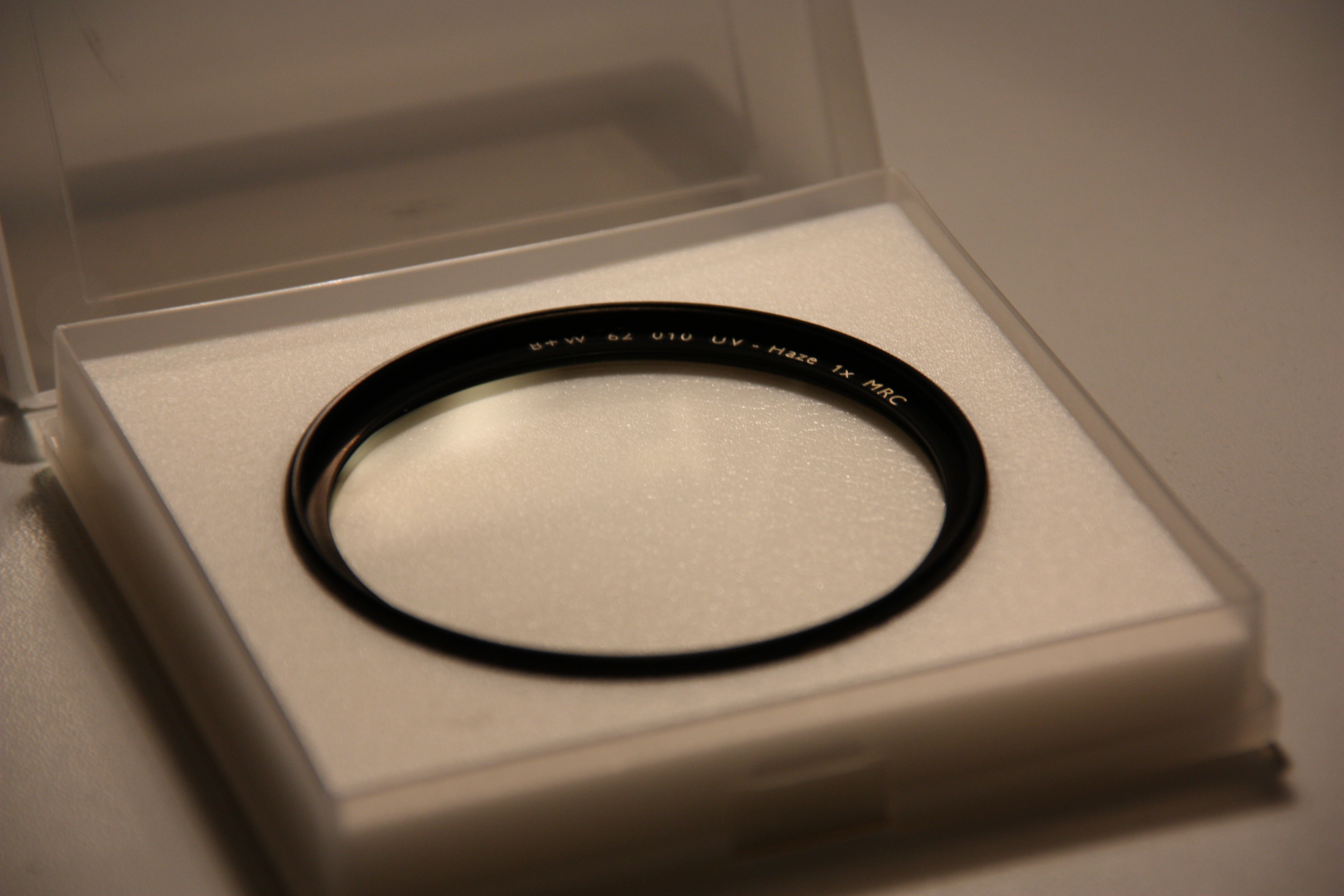
  B+W UV filter from Schneider Kreuznach
- In July 1987, it purchased Rollei Fototechnic GmbH.
- In 1989, it purchased Käsemann/Oberaudorf, a manufacturer of glass and plastic polarizing materials.
- After 1991 it acquired the former East-German (GDR) camera and lens manufacturer Pentacon/Practica (Dresden)
- In 2000, it acquired Century Optics, an American lensmaking firm.

== Small format lenses ==
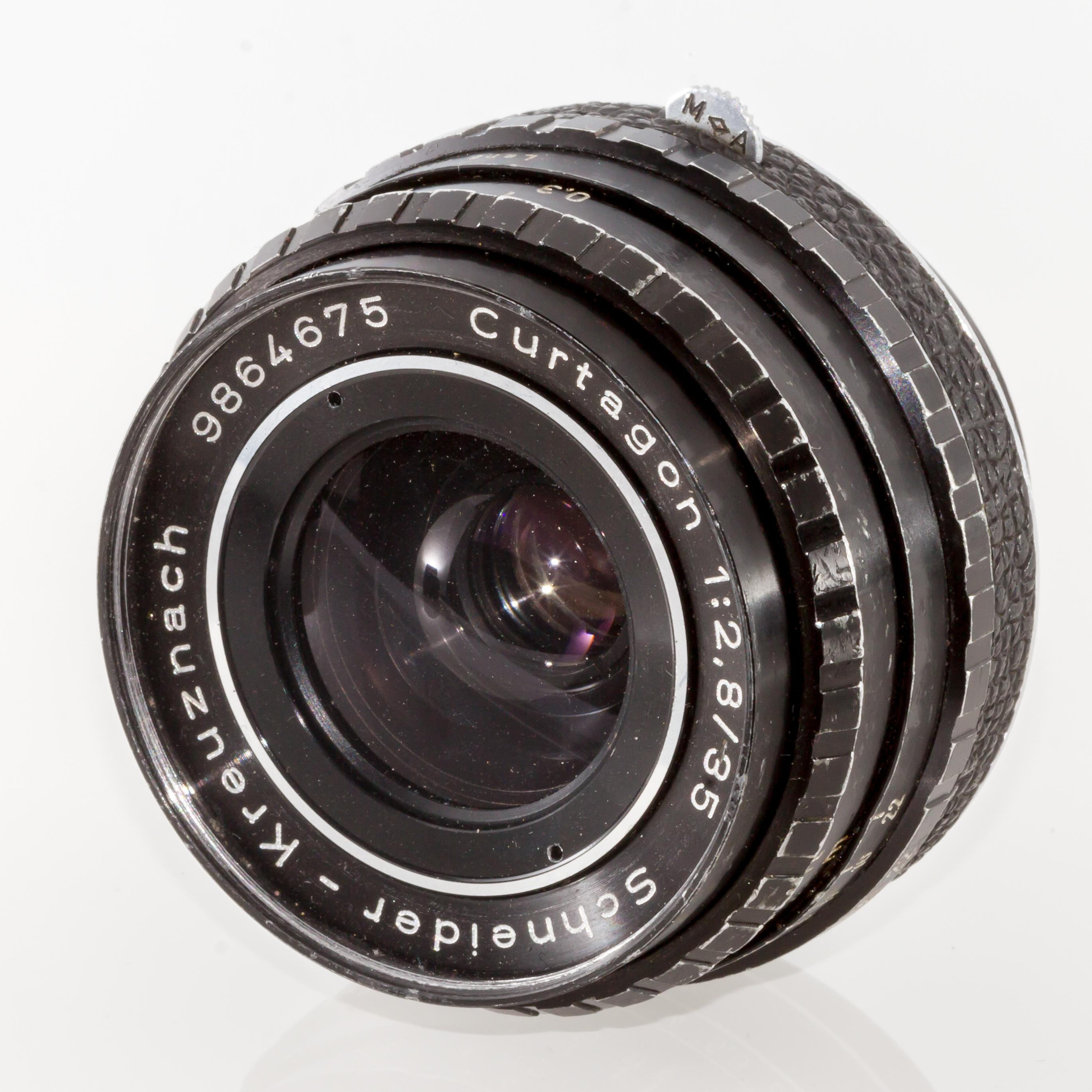
1:2.8/35mm Curtagon lens in M42 screw mount

=== Angulon ===
A Schneider Kreuznach lens made for the German 35mm Rolleiflex SL35 and SL350 SLR cameras equipped with Quick Bayonet Mount (QBM)

- Rollei SL-Angulon 35 mm f2.8

=== C-Curtagon ===
A very small lens, available in M42 screw mount.

- 28 mm f/4
- 35 mm f/2.8
- 35 mm f/4

=== Curtagon ===
- 28 mm f/4 (M42 mount and possibly others)
- 28 mm f/4 Exakta mount with large silver shutter release knob and clear plastic f stop scale Captain Jacks Schneider Lens Page
- 28 mm f/4 (Retina-Curtagon: different exterior design than the M42 mount lens, DKL-mount for Kodak Retina Reflex S and later cameras)
- 28 mm f/4 Edixa-Curtagon M42 mount, no knurled zebra focus ring
- 28 mm f/4 Curtagon M42 mount, no knurled zebra focus ring, has dark red f stop scale with different exterior lens barrel design than the Edixa-Curtagon; similar to the 35mm f2.8 Curtagon photo shown to the right of this column
- 35 mm f/2.8
- 35 mm f/2.8 Exakta mount with large silver shutter release knob, aperture tab and clear plastic cover over the f stop scale Captain Jacks Schneider Lens Page
- 35 mm f2.8 Exakta mount, smaller silver shutter release knob with Auto / Manual switch, different style aperture tab, clear plastic cover over f stop scale and connection for selenium light meter Captain Jacks Schneider Lens Page
- 35 mm f2.8 Exakta mount, smaller overall lens than above zebra Exakta Curtagons, small silver button within a larger shutter release knob no aperture tab, no clear plastic cover over f stop scale and no connection for selenium light meter Captain Jacks Schneider Lens Page
- 35 mm f/4 Exakta standard mount zebra style focus ring, no shutter release knob, no clear plastic cover over f stop scale and no selenium light meter connection
- 35 mm f/4 M42 mount zebra style focus ring, no shutter release knob, no clear plastic cover over f stop scale and no selenium light meter connection
- 35 mm f4 Exakta REAL mount no shutter release knob or clear plastic cover for f stop scale.
- Electric 35 mm f/2.8
- Edixa 35 mm f2.8 (M42 mount, similar in appearance and design to the standard Curtagon 35mm f2.8 for Exakta with knurled Zebra focus ring)
- Edixa 35 mm f2.8 (Edixa bayonet mount, Zebra non-knurled focus ring with 'Schneider Kreuznach - Edixa Curtagon' lettering on front of the lens but placed outside the filter ring)
- Edixa 35 mm f2.8 (Edixa bayonet mount, a completely different external design in all silver compared to the previous 2 Edixa-Curtagon designs)
- Edixa 35 mm f2.8 (COMPUR printed on outside lens barrel. Design similar in appearance to Schneider Kreuznach Lenses for the German Kodak camera)
- Retina 35 mm f/2.8 (a complete lens with focusing ring and aperture control with the DKL Deckel mount)
- Alpa 35 mm f2.8
- 35 mm f2.8, for Rollei SL 35 and SL 350 QBM mount (rare)
- 35 mm f2.8 Balda-Curtagon - exterior looks like a Retina-Curtagon but has the inscription Balda-Curtagon
- 35 mm f/4.0

=== Isogon ===
- 40 mm f/4.5 with Exakta mount

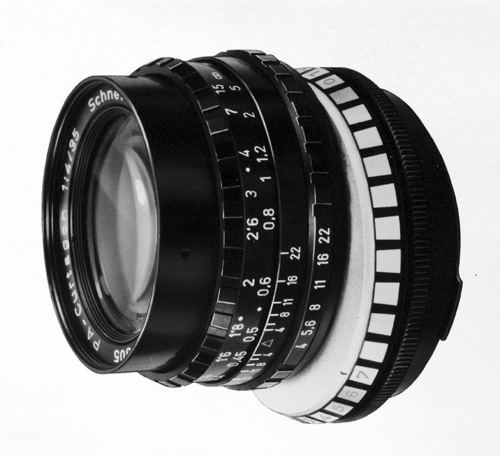
1:4/35mm PA-Curtagon lens

=== PA-Curtagon ===
A perspective-control lens of 7 elements in 6 groups for 35mm cameras, which allows shifting of up to 7 mm, in an axis defined by a separate rotating ring on the lens. The PA-Curtagon is available in Praktica (M42), Exakta, Alpa-Reflex, Contarex, Leica R, Minolta, Miranda, Canon, Nikon, Contarex, and Olympus OM mounts. It was also available for Rollei QBM mount under the name PC-Curtagon.

- 35 mm f/4

=== Curtar-Xenon ===
- Retina-Curtar-Xenon C 35 mm f/4 (made for the German Kodak Retina IIc/IIC, IIIc/IIIC, and Kodak Retina Reflex cameras, the lens only incorporates the front optical block and has no aperture ring, these are part of the camera)
- Retina-Curtar-Xenon C 35 mm f5.6 (made for the German Kodak Retina convertible lens cameras, the lens only incorporates the front optical block and has no aperture ring, these are part of the camera)

=== Retina-Xenon ===
- Longar-Xenon C 80 mm f/4 (made for the German Kodak Retina IIIc/IIIC. The 50mm f2.8 was usually fitted to the earlier German Kodak cameras.)

=== Retina-Xenon ===
- Retina-Xenon C 50 mm f/2 (made for the German Kodak Retina IIIc/IIIC. The 50mm f2.8 was usually fitted to the earlier German Kodak cameras.)

=== Radiogon ===
- 35 mm f/4.0
- 35 mm f/4.0 Braun-Radiogon for Braun rangefinder camera mount

=== Radionar ===
A Cooke triplet (3-element, 3-group) design with a minimum aperture of f/22.

- 35 mm f/4.0 with a minimum aperture of f/22. Lens is the same as Curtagon version, only serial numbers are earlier.
- 38 mm f3.5 for Robot Camera
- 40 mm f/2.8
- 45 mm f/2.8 Radionar L (fitted to the German Adox Polo 1S rangefinder camera - early 1960s vintage)
- 50 mm f/2.9 (fitted to an Edinex I camera 1930s)
- 50 mm f/3.5 with Pronto SV shutter fitted to a Balda Baldinette camera
- 5.0 cm f/4.5
- 7.5 cm f/2.9
- 7.5 cm f/4.5 with a Pronto shutter
- 80 mm f/2.9 fitted to the Frank Solida III camera - stamped US Zone
- 105 mm f/4.5 (fitted to the German folding camera Bower X)
- 105 mm f/4.5 with Prontor SV shutter fitted to Balda Baldalux camera

=== Reomar ===
A 3-element, 3-group design with a minimum aperture of f/22.

- 45 mm f/3.5 lens fitted to a Kodak Retinette camera
- 45 mm f/2.8 silver with black beauty and focus rings
- 50 mm f3.5
- 50 mm f/4.5 lens fitted to a Kodak Retinette camera

=== Super-Angulon ===
- 21 mm f/4.0

A 9/4 wide-angle lens with a minimum aperture of f/22

- 21 mm f/3.4

An update of the f/4.0 model, with an 8/4 design and slightly increased sharpness.

=== Super-Angulon R ===
A 10/8 wide-angle lens with a minimum aperture of f/22.

- 21 mm f/4

=== PC-Super-Angulon ===
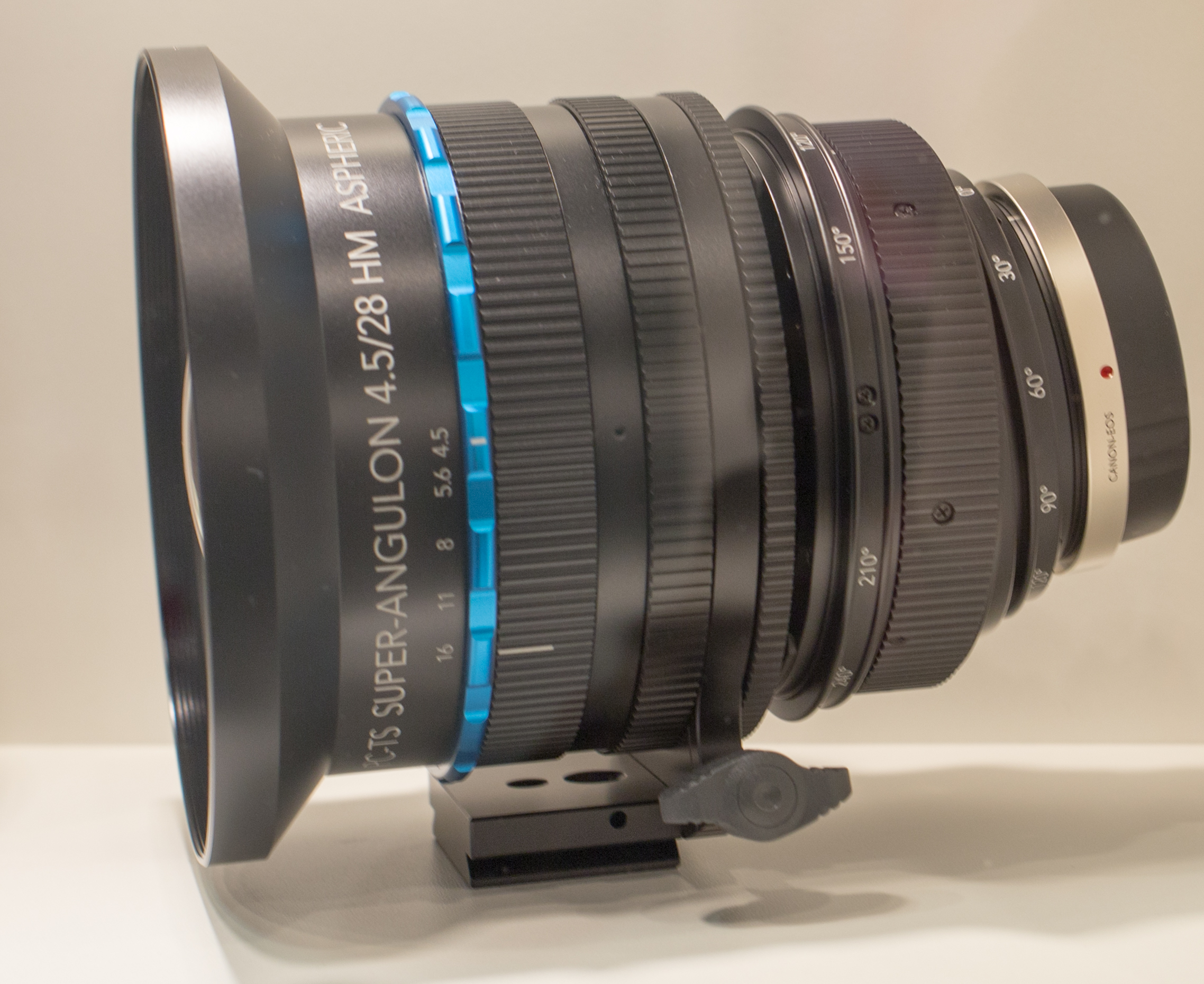
Schneider-Kreuznach TS 28mm lens

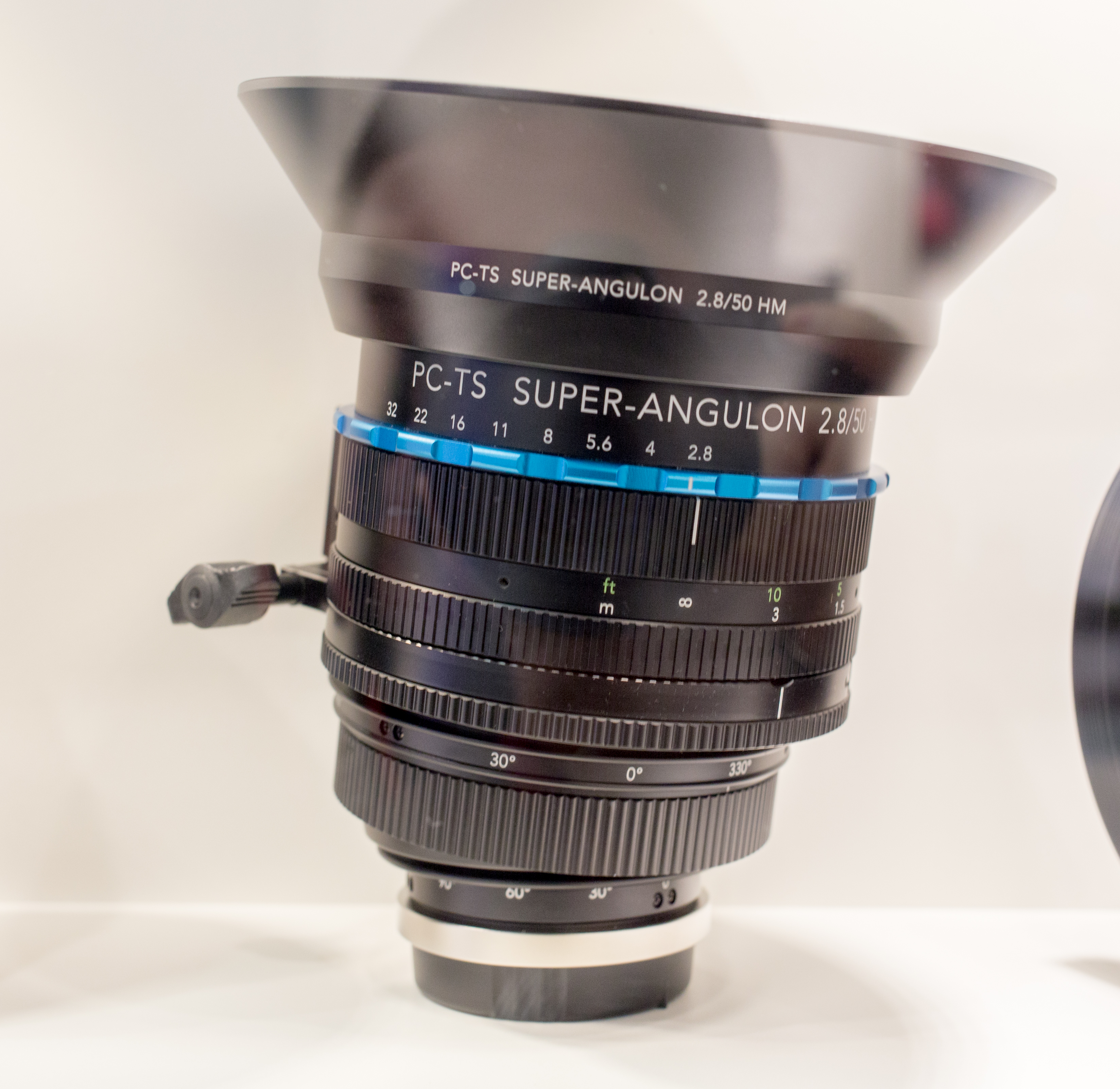
Schneider-Kreuznach TS 50mm lens

A 28 mm f/2.8 shift lens with 67EW filter thread and a lens shade with filter holder for 74R rimless filters and M92x1.00 filter ring. Many user-changeable mechanically-only mount modules available from Schneider Kreuznach. Also available as Leica PC-Super-Angulon R 28 mm f/2.8 with Leica R mount. Can be modified from a shift-only lens to a tilt-only lens by the German company.

- SUPER-ANGULON 28 f/2.8 for Canon EF and Nikon F mount (2014)
- SUPER-ANGULON 50 f/2.8 for Canon EF and Nikon F mount (2014)

=== Tele-Arton ===
- 85 mm f/4 Retina-Tele-Arton for German Kodak camera
- 85 mm f/4 Braun-Tele-Arton in DKL mount for Braun camera
- 90 mm f/4

=== Tele-Variogon ===
- 80–240 mm f/4
- 80-240 mm f/4 Alpa 35mm with pistol grip

=== Tele-Xenar ===
- 5 cm f/5.5 (early 1930s)
- 75 mm f/3.8
- 75 mm f/3.8 for C-mount silver and black finished barrel, inscriptions and front portion of lens barrel look very similar to the 150mm f/4.5 C-mount lens described later in this list
- 75 mm f/3.8 for Robot camera used in bombing assessment with Luftwaffe Eigentum (Luftwaffe Property) stamped on flange; lens barrel is all silver
- 75 mm f/3.8 for Robot camera - all black exterior and much more modern in appearance than the Robot lens listed above.
- 90 mm f/3.5
- 90 mm f/3.5 Schneider - ALPA Tele-Xenar with ALPA mount
- 90 mm f/3.5 Exakta mount, all silver lens barrel
- 90 mm f/3.5 with Diax written in script on the lens barrel. For Diax camera
- 100 mm f/3.8
- 135 mm f/3.5
- 135 mm f/3.5 Edixa
- 135 mm f/3.5 SL Tele-Xenar for Rollei 35mm cameras
- 135 mm f/3.5 Alpa-Tele-Xenar for 35mm cameras has shutter release knob
- 135 mm f/3.5 Exakta mount with large shutter release knob in early zebra finish (alternating black and silver focus ring)
- 135 mm f/3.5 M42 mount no shutter release knob, with early zebra finish (alternating black and silver focus ring)
- 135 mm f/4 Edixa-Tele-Xenar - all silver lens barrel different design than the 2 different zebra finish Edixa Curtagons
- 135 mm f/4 DKL mount for German Kodak camera
- 135 mm f/4
- 135 mm f/4 Balda Tele-Xenar for Balda German Rangefinder
- 150 mm f/4
- 150 mm f/4 for C-mount, barrel is satin finished, completely different design than the 150mm f/4.5 listed below
- 150 mm f/4.5
- 150 mm (15 cm) f/4.5 C-mount - completely different design than the following 150mm f4.5 C-mount lens - this lens has a black and silver barrel - older in design appearance
- 150 mm f/4.5 Tele-Xenar for C-mount - very well crafted lens barrel, different in appearance than other lenses in the Tele-Xenar series except the 75mm f/3.8 C-mount lens described above
- 180 mm f/4.5 for Exakta mount
- 180 mm (18cm) f/5.5 for Exakta mount - completely different barrel design than the 180mm f/4.5 with partial satin finish
- 200 mm f/4.8 Retina-Tele-Xenar with DKL mount for German Kodak camera, has tripod mount on lens underside
- 200 mm f/5.5
- 200 mm f/5.5 for Robot Camera
- 200 mm f/5.5 for Exakta mount with later version zebra stripes on barrel
- 240 mm f/4.5
- 240 mm f/5.5
- 240 mm f/5.5 for the early 40mm Practiflex mount, in late 1948 Practiflex lenses were manufactured in M42 mount
- 360 mm f/5.5
- 360 mm f/5.5 Alpa Tele-Xenar for Alpa cameras
- 360 mm f/5.5 Exakta mount with tripod mount on lens barrel

=== Variogon ===
The first variable-focal-length lens with fixed back focal distance for 35 mm cameras, introduced in 1964.

- 45–100 mm f/2.8
- 80–240 mm f/4

These lenses were available with 19 interchangeable mounts (loosen two screws and replace with a different mount). The mounts each have a small number on them and equate as follows:

- Type of mount
- 2 = M42 (Pentax Screw, Universal Screw, etc.)
- 3 = Exacta Bayonet
- 4 = Alpa Bayonet
- 10 = Canon FD
- 11 = C Mount
- 13 = Nikon F
- 14 = Leica R
- 15 = Contare
- ? = Arriflex
- ? = Arri MT?

Production of the 80–240 mm f/4 is said to be approximately 250 units, the 45–100 mm f/2.8 about 57 units. The 80–240 is split amongst two different variants.

=== Xenagon ===
4 elements in 3 groups of genre "Wide Angle Tessar"

- 30 mm f/3.5 (Robot 24, and Robot Royal mounts)
- 35 mm f/2.8
- 35 mm f/3.5 (Voss Diax mount, Akarette mount)
- 35 mm f/4.0

=== Xenar ===
Xenar (Tronnier, 1935)

The Xenar uses a Tessar-type optical formula, originally designed by Paul Rudolph for Zeiss, with 4 elements in 3 groups, and the rear group is a cemented doublet. The formula could only be used by Schneider Kreuznach after the original 1902 Tessar patent had expired in 1919. Many contemporary lenses with long production runs were based on a similar 4 element / 3 group formula (e.g. Leitz Elmar, Voigtländer Skopar, and Kodak Ektar).

- 38mm f/2.8 (for 24×24mm)
- 40mm f/3.5 (for Rollei 35)
- 45mm f/2.8
- 50mm f/2.8 (for 24×36mm)
- 50mm f/2.8 Braun-Xenar R with DKL mount 5 aperture blades
- 50mm f/2.8 Retina-Xenar for Kodak Type 1 1949 with integral compur shutter
- 50mm f/2.8 Karat-Xenar with Compur-Rapid Shutter
- 50mm f/2.8 Edixa-Xenar M42 mount with 5 blade aperture and hill-valley knurled focus ring
- 50mm f/2.8 Edixa-Reflex with 10 blade aperture (rare)
- 50mm f/2.8 Edixa-Lauder with 15 blade aperture, aluminum body and 4 elements in 3 groups
- 50mm f/2.8 Edixa-Reflex with 15 blade aperture, aluminum body and 4 elements in 3 groups
- 50mm f/2.8 Edixa-Reflex m39 screw mount for Braun-Paxette camera with 15 blade aperture, chromed brass body and 4 elements in 3 groups
- 50mm f/2.8 Edixa-Reflex with 15 blade aperture chromed brass body, also called Super Xenar in some references, 5 elements in 4 groups m42
- 50mm f/3.5 Edixa-Reflex with 15 blade aperture chromed brass body - similar in appearance to the '50mm f/2.8 Super Xenar - described above' m42
- 50mm f/3.5 Retina-Xenar for Kodak Type 1A camera with integral compur shutter
- 50mm f/3.5 Xenar for Braun-Akarette camera
- 60mm f/3.5
- 75mm f/2.8
- 75mm f/3.5 (for 6×6 medium format, e.g. Rolleicord from model III to Vb)
- 75mm f/4.5 <Kodak (Nagel Factory) Vollenda 127 Film Camera, Compur Shutter 2668918, 1933, Germany>
- 80mm f/2.8 M42 16 blade aperture rare
- 105mm f/4.5 for 2&1/2 x 3&1/4 sheet film cameras
- 13.5 cm f/4.5 (1936)
- 135mm f/4.5 for M42 mount

=== Xenogon ===
A wide-angle of type Xenon. 7 elements in 5 groups.

- 35 mm f/2.8 (a small lens for Leica L39 mount similar to the Leica 35mm f3.5 Summaron)
- 35 mm f/2.8 (a completely different external lens design for the German Robot Royal 26 bayonet mount camera)

=== Rollei SL Xenon ===
- 50 mm f/1.8

=== Xenon ===
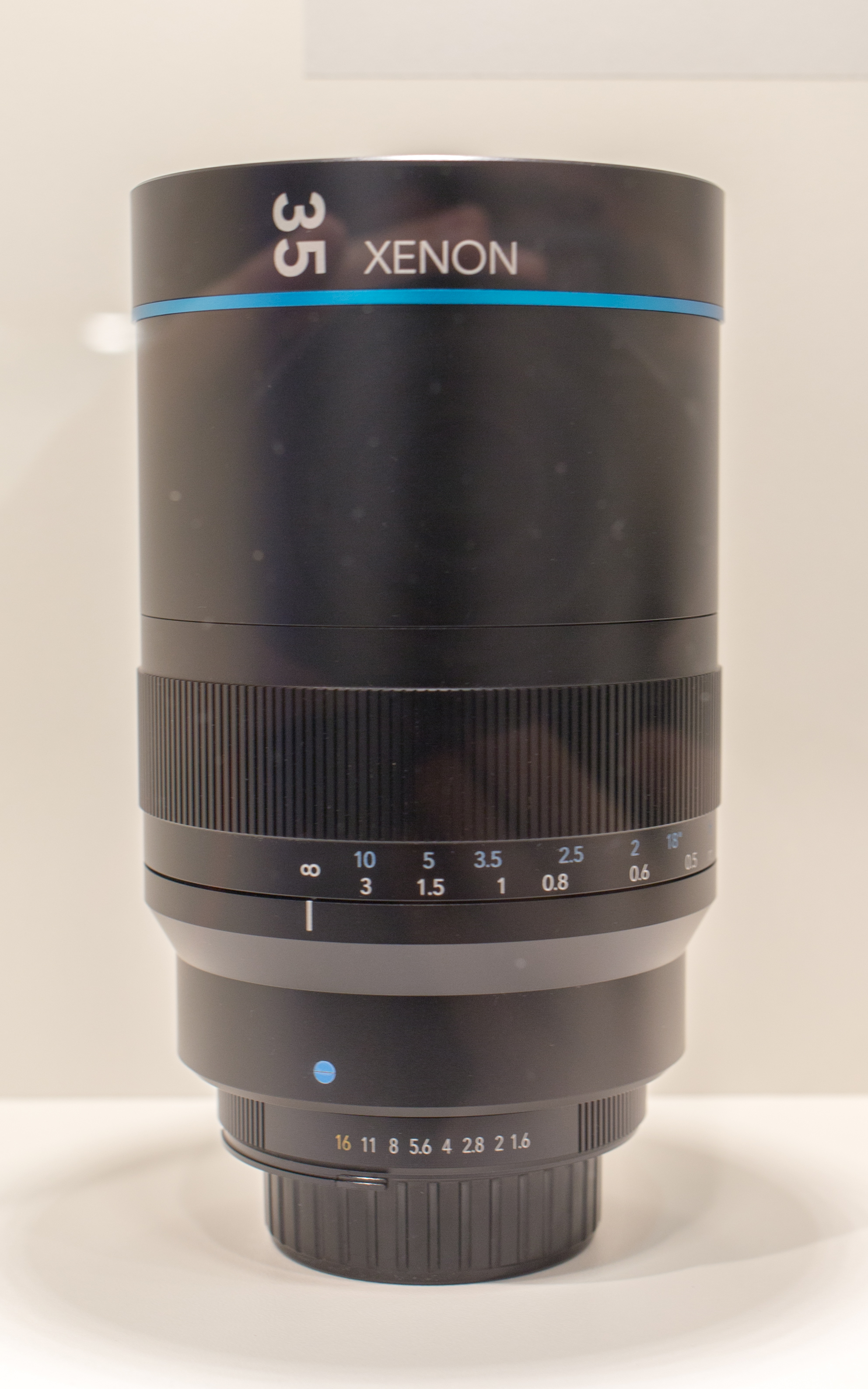
Schneider-Kreuznach Xenon 1.6/35

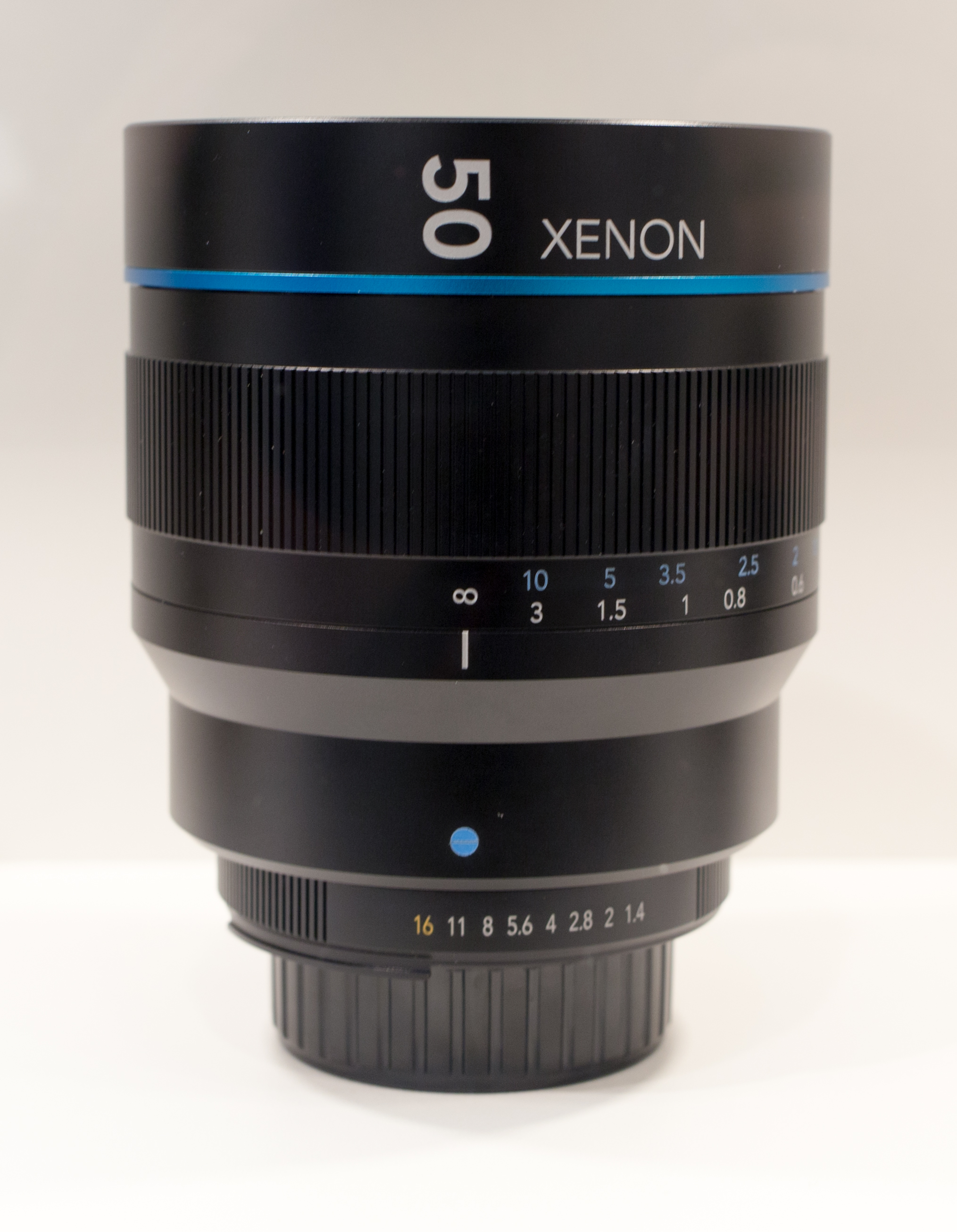
Schneider-Kreuznach Xenon 1.4/50

Designed in 1925 by Tronnier, it is an asymmetrical derivative of the classical double-Gauss design.

- 16 mm f/1.9
- 28mm mm f/2.0 Arri standard mount
- 25 mm f0.95 industrial C-mount lens
- 25 mm f1.5 Arri Arriflex 16mm movie camera
- 35 mm f/1.6 – made for Canon EF and Nikon F Mount 2015
- 40 mm f/1.9 - for Robot cameras
- 50 mm f/1.5 – made for Leica M39/Screw Mount ca.1942–1947
- 50 mm f/1.4 – made for Canon EF and Nikon F Mount 2015
- 50 mm f/1.9
- 50 mm f/1.9 - Type I 1952 Exakta mount all silver aluminum finish. Large shutter release knob, 6 elements in 4 groups. 18 aperture blades 0.75 m close focus distance. Aperture scale is recessed within a stylistic scalloped aluminum surround. https://lens-db.com/schneider-kreuznach-xenon-50mm-f19-type-1-1952/
- 50 mm f/1/9 - Type II 1958 Exakta mount with large shutter release knob and clear plastic cover over f stop scale, zebra finish on focus and aperture ring, 6 elements in 4 groups, close focus distance 0.5 m 18 aperture blades; https://lens-db.com/schneider-kreuznach-xenon-50mm-f19-type-2-1958/
- 50 mm f/1.9 - Retina-Xenon completely different exterior design than Exakta version with DKL Deckel mount for German Kodak
- 50 mm f/1.9 - Exakta mount with 18 aperture blades, no plastic cover over f stop scale, different design shutter release knob, zebra finish on focus and aperture rings (rare)
- 50 mm f/1.9 - Type III 1966 Exakta mount with smaller, black shutter release knob, no plastic covering over f stop scale, no zebra finish on focus ring. 6 elements in 4 groups, close focus distance 0.5 m. https://lens-db.com/schneider-kreuznach-xenon-50mm-f19-type-3-1966/ Overall lens is much smaller than the zebra finish lenses previously listed - similar in size to the M42 lens listed next
- 50 mm f/1.9 M42 mount with no shutter release knob, no plastic covering over f stop scale, no zebra finish on focus ring
- 50 mm f/1.9 M42 mount with no shutter release knob, no plastic covering over f stop scale, Schneider Krueuznach and Xenon are placed around the extreme outside of the lens beauty ring with focal length and maximum f stop and has vertical zebra stripes but of a different design than the Exakta lenses
- 50 mm f/1.9 ALPA-Xenon - ALPA mount
- 50 mm f/1.8
- 50 mm f/2.3
- 50 mm f/2.0 1954–1957
- 80 mm f/2.0 M42 screw mount
- 17 mm f/0.95
- 25 mm f/0.95

== Medium format lenses ==
=== Variogon ===
==== Beta-Variogon ====
- 75mm - 150mm mm f/4.5 MACRO switch on lens side, zoom lens for medium format, Manual / Auto switch (Hasselblad mount)

The Variogon is a zoom lens.

- 60-140mm f/4.6 AF (for Rollei 6000)
- 60–140 mm f/4.6 AFD (for Rollei Hy6)
- 70–140 mm f/4.5 (for Bronica ETR)
- 75–150 mm f/4.5 (for Rollei 6000, Bronica SQ & Exakta 66 [1980s–2000 version])
- 125–250 mm f/5.6 (for Bronica ETR) (Zenzanon-E for Zenza Bronica)
- 140–280 mm f/5.6 (for Hasselblad 500 C/M, Hasselblad 2000 FC, Rollei 6000 & Exakta 66 [1980s–2000 version])

=== Super-Angulon ===
- 40 mm f/3.5 (for Rollei 6000)
- 50 mm f/2.8 (for Rollei 6000)
- 50 mm f/2.8 AF (for Rollei 6000)
- 50 mm f/2.8 AFD (for Rollei Hy6)

=== PCS Super-Angulon ===
PCS stands for "Perspective Control, Scheimpflug", which indicates that this is a tilt and shift version of the Super-Angulon. This lens will shift up to 12 mm up/10 mm down, and tilt up to 10°, all in the vertical axis.

- 55 mm f/4.5 (for Bronica ETR, Rollei 6000 & Exakta 66 [1980s–2000 version])

=== Curtagon ===
- 60 mm f/3.5 (for Rollei 6000 & Exakta 66 [1980s–2000 version])

=== AV Xenotar ===
- 150 mm f/2.8 HFT (for 6 x 6 Rollei projector)
- 90 mm f/2.4 HFT (projector lens)

=== Xenotar ===
- 75 mm f/3.5 (for Rolleiflex E & E3 TLR)
- 80 mm f/2.8 (for Rollei 6000 & Exakta 66 [1980s–2000 version])
- 80 mm f/2 (for Rollei 6000)
- 80 mm f/2.8 AF (for Rollei 6000)
- 80 mm f/2.8 AFD (for Rollei Hy6)

=== Apo-Symmar Makro ===
- 90 mm f/4 (for Rollei 6000)
- 150 mm f/4.6 (for Rollei 6000)

=== Tele-Xenar ===
- 150 mm f/4 (for Rollei 6000 & Exakta 66 [1980s–2000 version])
- 150 mm f/4 AF (for Rollei 6000)
- 150 mm f/4 AFD (for Rollei Hy6)
- 180 mm f/2.8 (for Rollei 6000)
- 180 mm f/2.8 AF (for Rollei 6000)
- 180 mm f/2.8 AFD (for Rollei Hy6)
- 250 mm f/5.6 (for Exakta 66 [1980s–2000 version])

=== Apo-Tele-Xenar ===
- 300 mm f/4 (for Rollei 6000)

=== Leaf Shutter ===
The Leaf Shutter lenses are designed for the Phase One (company) 645 camera platform.

- LS 28 mm f/4,5 Aspherical
- LS 35 mm f/3.5
- LS 45 mm f/3.5
- LS 55 mm f/2.8
- LS 80 mm f/2.8
- LS 40-80mm LS f/4.0-5.6
- LS 110 mm f/2.8
- LS 120 mm f/4.0 Macro Lens
- LS 75–150 mm f/4,0-5,6
- LS 150 mm f/3.5
- LS 240 mm f/4,5 IF

=== APO-Digitar ===
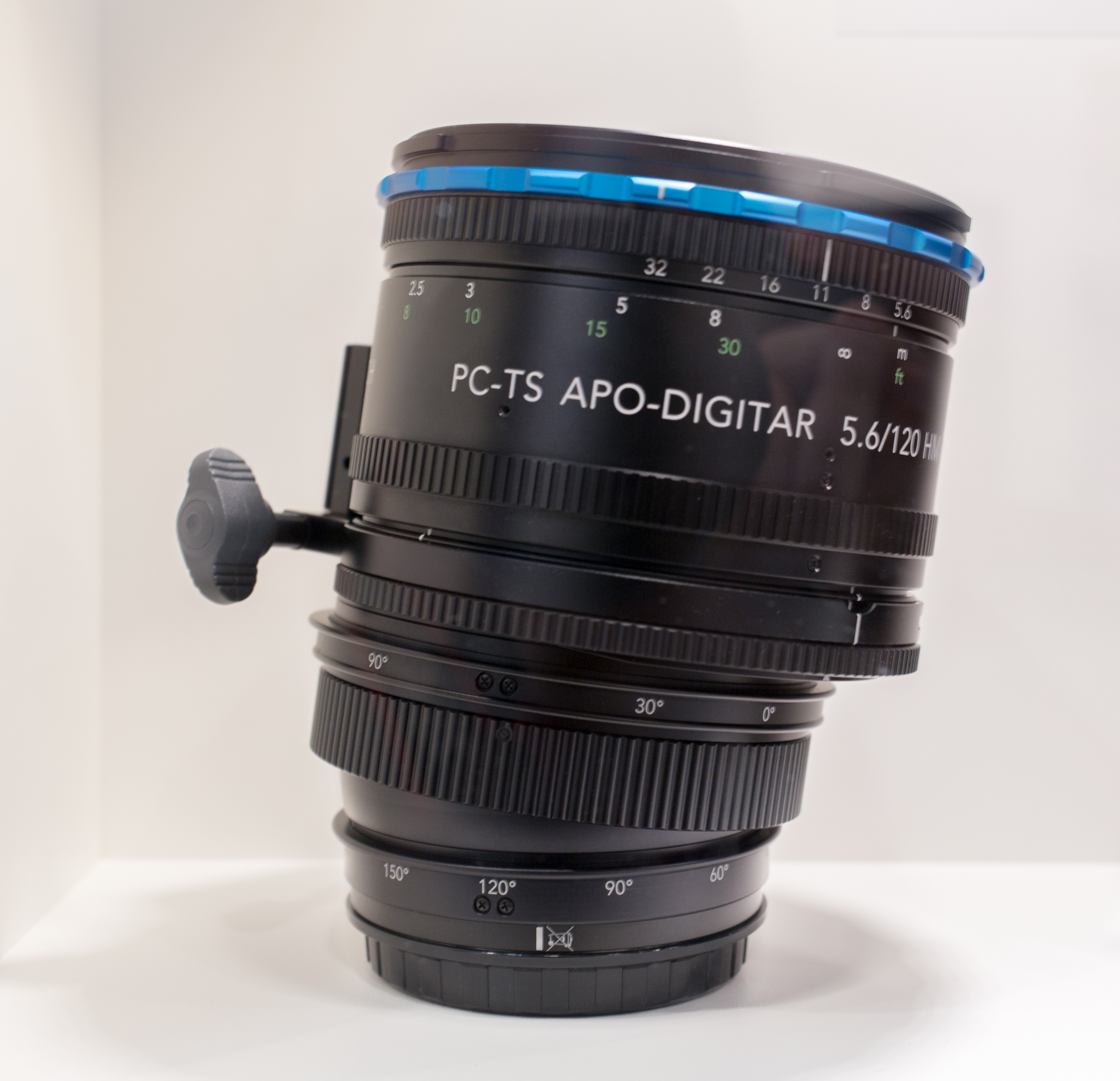
Schneider-Kreuznach TS 120mm lens

PC-TS APO-DIGITAR for Mamiya / Phase One. Same lens is available as LEICA TS-APO-ELMAR-S 1:5,6/120 mm ASPH for Leica S. It is a tilt–shift lens.

- LS 120 mm f/5.6
- Alpa APO Digitar XL 24mm mm F5.6 included Alpa Center Filter
- Alpa APO Digitar XL 35mm mm F5.6 included Alpa Center Filter
- 80 mm f/4.0 lens elements made in Germany, assembled in Japan not a tilt shift lens Copal Press No. O shutter

== Large format lenses ==
Schneider's line of large format lenses has a reputation for high-quality construction and durability, and all lenses carry a lifetime warranty. Some of the higher-end lenses of the Schneider line are among the most expensive optics available in large format photography.

=== Angulon ===
Introduced in 1930, the Angulon is the original Schneider wide-angle lens line. It is a 6-element, 2-group, symmetric anastigmat design somewhat related to the Goerz Dagor. Compared to many modern wide angles, they are quite compact, though the angle of coverage is only 80°, although an early catalogue from 1934 lists this series as having an angle of view of 105° (it is unclear as to the test-conditions or what is deemed an acceptable result). They are color-corrected reasonably well, but suffer from significant softening of the image close to the edge of the circle of illumination. Only the outer elements are supported by the mount, the inner elements are mounted by cementing to the outer elements. For this reason they are prone to "slippage", especially if stored "on end" in hot climates.

Coverage of 90-210mm at f/11

- 65mm f/6.8 (for 6×9 cm)
- 90mm f/6.8 (for 4x5")
- 90mm f/6.8 with COMPUR-RAPID shutter
- 120mm f/6.8 (for 5x7")
- 165mm f/6.8 (for 8x10")
- 210mm f/6.8 (for 10x12")

A catalogue from 1934 also proclaims the Angulon f/6.8 series as a convertible anastigmat: "...the components of which can be used separately and give two different foci". When the elements are used separately, their focal lengths are approximately x1.5 for the Rear and x2 for the Front, the narrower aperture results in the need for 2x and 4x longer exposures, respectively.

- 90mm Rear 140mm, Front 185mm (for 4x5")
- 120mm Rear 185mm, Front 250mm (for 5x7")
- 165mm Rear 260mm, Front 345mm (for 8x10")
- 210mm Rear 330mm, Front 430mm (for 10x12")

=== Dagor Gold Dot ===
- 355mm f8 (COMPUR 3 shutter)

=== Super-Angulon ===
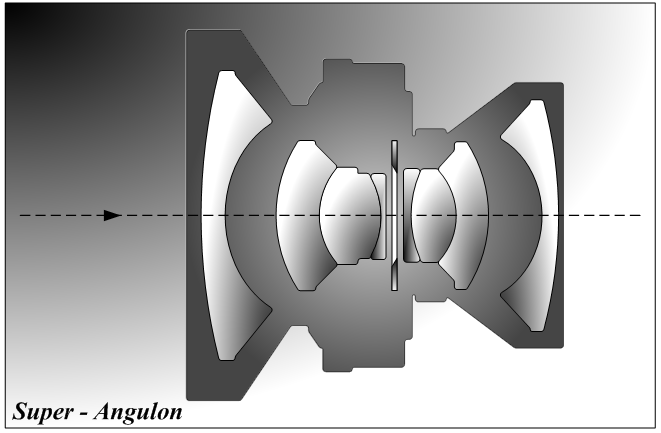
Schneider Super-Angulon 5.6/47 mm.

These are wide-angle lenses which have been developed in several steps. The Super-Angulons are Biogon designs, making for huge, heavy lenses, but also giving very generous angles of coverage. The f/4 lenses give 95° of coverage, the f/8 models give 100°, and the f/5.6 units give a 105° coverage angle. The f/4 and f/5.6 lenses are 8-element, 4-group designs, while the f/8 lenses are older 6-element, 4-group, symmetrical designs. Coating technologies improved along the production life of these lenses, and recent Super-Angulons are multicoated.

- 47mm f/5.6 (for 6×9 cm)
- 47mm f/8
- 53mm f/4 (for 6×7 cm)
- 65mm f/5.6 (for 4×5 in)
- 65mm f/8
- 75mm f/5.6
- 75mm f/8
- 75mm f/8 for Linhof Technika
- 90mm f/5.6
- 90mm f/8
- 90mm f/8 SINAR version (SINAR in red letters before Super-Angulon on beauty ring)
- 120mm f/8 (for 5×7 in)
- 121mm f/8
- 165mm f/8 (for 8×10 in)
- 210mm f/8 (for 11×14 in)

=== Super-Angulon XL ===
This is an update of the Super-Angulon lens design, incorporating modern glass and multicoating technologies, and an expanded angle of coverage.

- 38mm f/5.6 (120°, for 6×9 cm)
- 47mm f/5.6 (120°, for 4×5 in)
- 58mm f/5.6 (110°)
- 72mm f/5.6 (115°, for 5×7 in)
- 90mm f/5.6 (110°)

=== Symmar ===
The Symmar is one of the original Schneider designs, introduced in 1920, and is still relevant and used today. They have a 6-element, 4-group, symmetric design, and give a 70° angle of coverage. The f/5.6 series of lenses are "convertible", meaning that by removing one of the lens cells the user creates a 3 element lens of longer focal length than the complete lens. The resulting 3 element lens has a narrower aperture of f/12 and an angle of view of 40°. These lenses have two aperture markings, one in white for the complete lens and one in green for the converted lens. When "converted" the resulting 3 element lens will produce softer images than the complete lens.

Coverage of the f/6.8-series at "small stop"

- 60mm f/6.8 (for 6x12cm)
- 75mm f/6.8 (for 6x12cm)
- 80mm f/5.6 (for 6×7 cm)
- 90mm f/6.8 (for 4x5")
- 100mm f/5.6 & 175mm f/12 (for 6×9 cm)
- 105mm f/6.8 (for 4×5")
- 120mm f/6.8 (for 5x7")
- 135mm f/5.6 & 235mm f/12 (for 4×5")
- 135mm f/6.8 (for 5x7")
- 150mm f/5.6 & 265mm f/12 (for 4×5")
- 150mm f/6.8 (for 5x7")
- 165mm f/6.8 (for 5x7")
- 180mm f/5.6 & 315mm f/12 (for 5×7")
- 180mm f/6.8 (for 8x10")
- 195mm f/6.8 (for 8x10")
- 210mm f/5.6 & 370mm f/12 (for 5×7")
- 210mm f/6.8 (for 10x12")
- 240mm f/5.6 & 420mm f/12 (for 8×10")
- 240mm f/6.8 (for 11x14")
- 270mm f/6.8 (for 14x16")
- 300mm f/5.6 & 500mm f/12 (for 8×10")
- 300mm f/6.8 (for 16x18")
- 360mm f/5.6 & 620mm f/12 (for 11×14")
- 360mm f/6.8 (for 16x20")

=== Symmar-S ===
The Symmar-S is an incremental improvement to the original Symmar design, adding multicoating to the feature set. The lens is not symmetric like its predecessor and is not convertible. The available focal lengths are slightly different, with the subtraction of the 80 mm, and addition of a 120 mm and two 480 mm lenses of varying speeds.

- 100 mm f/5.6 (for 6×9 cm)
- 120 mm f/5.6 (for 4×5 in)
- 135 mm f/5.6
- 150 mm f/5.6
- 180 mm f/5.6 (for 5×7 in)
- 210 mm f/5.6
- 240 mm f/5.6 (for 8×10 in)
- 300 mm f/5.6
- 360 mm f/6.8 (for 11×14 in)
- 480 mm f/8.4
- 480 mm f/9.4

=== Apo-Symmar ===
This is a 6-element, 4-group apochromatic lens design, which has since been replaced by the Apo-Symmar L-Series. Using low-dispersion glass and multicoating techniques, secondary-spectrum reflections have been greatly reduced. The Apo-Symmar lenses up to 360 mm have a 72° angle of coverage, and the 480 mm lenses give a 56° angle.

- 100 mm f/5.6 (for 6×9 cm)
- 120 mm f/5.6 (for 4×5 in)
- 135 mm f/5.6
- 150 mm f/5.6
- 180 mm f/5.6 (for 5×7 in)
- 210 mm f/5.6
- 240 mm f/5.6 (for 8×10 in)
- 300 mm f/5.6
- 360 mm f/6.8 (for 11×14 in)
- 480 mm f/8.4
- 480 mm f/9.4

=== Apo-Symmar L-Series ===
This is a redesign of the Apo-Symmar line, using new environmentally friendly glass compositions and incorporating slightly more coverage. These are 6-element, 4-group apochromatic lenses with a 75° angle of coverage.

- 120 mm f/5.6 (for 4×5 in)
- 150 mm f/5.6 (for 5×7 in)
- 180 mm f/5.6
- 210 mm f/5.6 (for 8×10 in)
- 300 mm f/5.6
- 480 mm f/8.4 (for 11×14 in)

=== Super-Symmar HM ===
These are 8-element, 6-group variations of the Symmar line, which feature an 80° angle of coverage. The HM in the name indicates that these lenses use high-modulation glass elements.

- 120 mm f/5.6 (for 4×5 in)
- 150 mm f/5.6 (for 5×7 in and 4x10 in)
- 210 mm f/5.6 (for 8×10 in)

=== Super-Symmar XL ===
These are wide-angle lenses of a 6-element, 5-group aspheric design, which give a 105° angle of coverage. These lenses are also heavily corrected for chromatic aberrations, and are physically more compact than other wide-angle lenses of similar focal lengths.

- 80 mm f/4.5 (for 5×7 in)
- 110 mm f/5.6 (for 5x7 in)
- 150 mm f/5.6 (for 8×10 in)
- 210 mm f/5.6 (for 11×14 in)

=== Xenar ===
Schneider's inexpensive, classic Xenar asymmetrical, anastigmatic, 4-element, 3-group lens design was introduced in 1919, and is largely unchanged from the original Zeiss Tessar formula. They feature an angle of coverage of 60–62°.

- 75mm f/3.5 (for 6×6 cm)
- 90mm f/4.5 (for 6×9 cm)
- 90mm f/5.5
- 100mm f/3.5
- 105mm f/2.9
- 105mm f/3.5
- 105mm f/3.8
- 105mm f/4.5
- 105mm f/5.5
- 120mm f/3.5
- 120mm f/4.5
- 120mm f/5.5
- 135mm f/3.5 (for 4×5")
- 135mm f/3.8
- 135mm f/4.5
- 135mm f/4.7
- 135mm f/4.7 with Synchro COMPUR-P shutter
- 135mm f/5.5
- 150mm f/3.5
- 150mm f/4.5
- 150mm f/4.5 with Press-COMPUR shutter
- 150mm f/5.5
- 165mm f/3.5
- 165mm f/4.5
- 165mm f/5.5
- 180mm f/3.5
- 180mm f/4.5
- 180mm f/5.5
- 195mm f/4.5 (for 5×7")
- 195mm f/5.5
- 210mm f/3.5
- 210mm f/4.5
- 210mm f/5.5
- 210mm f/6.1
- 240mm f/3.5
- 240mm f/4.5
- 270mm f/4.5
- 300mm f/3.5 (for 8×10")
- 300mm f/4.5
- 300mm f/5.6
- 360mm f/4.5
- 420mm f/4.5 (for 11×14")
- 480mm f/4.5 (for 14×17")

=== Aero-Xenar ===
- 250mm f/4.5 (for 4.5x6")
- 300mm f/4.5 (for 5x7")
- 500mm f/4.5 (for 5x12")

=== Press-Xenar ===
- 127mm f/4.7 (for 4x5 Linhof)

=== Tele-Xenar ===
An inexpensive 4-element, 2-group telephoto lens design featuring 35° of coverage. The 1000 mm lenses, by comparison, give only an 18° angle of coverage, but require even less focal distance than other telephoto designs (slightly more than 1/2 the effective focal length, as opposed to about 2/3 for a normal tele lens).

- 180mm f/5.5
- 180mm f/5.6
- 240mm f/5.5
- 270mm f/5.5
- 300mm f/5.5
- 360mm f/5.5 (for 4x5")
- 500mm f/5.5
- 1000mm f/8
- 1000mm f/10

=== Tele-Xenar ===
- 90mm f/3.8 fitted with the Robot Camera mount
- 135 mm f/4 (Retina-Tele-Xenar DKL mount)
- 200 mm f/4.8 (Retine-Tele-Xenar for Kodak camera in DKL mount)
- 245mm f/4.5 fitted with Exakta mount

=== Apo-Tele-Xenar ===
These are apochromatic telephoto lenses using a 5-element variation of the Tele-Xenar design. They can be used on subjects as close as 2 meters without a loss of resolution, and are painted a non-reflective flat grey to reduce thermal absorption and expansion under sunlight or hot studio lights. The 400 mm Compact model is half the length and 70% the weight of the normal Apo-Tele-Xenar 400 mm lens. The 350 mm compact model is actually not a tele-design but a dialyte; however it is called the Apo Tele Xenar 350 Compact.

- 350mm f/11 Compact (for up to 8x10 in)
- 400 mm f/5.6 (for 5×7 in)
- 400 mm f/5.6 Compact
- 600 f/9 - 800 f/12 mm
- 800 mm f/12 (for 8×10 in)

=== Xenotar ===
A 5-element, 4-group design, giving a 60° angle of coverage. These are fast lenses compared to other lens designs of similar focal length, but with somewhat less coverage.

- 75mm f/3.5 (for 6×6 cm)
- 80mm f/2.8 (for 6×7 cm)
- 100mm f/4
- 100mm f/2.8 (for 6×9 cm)
- 105mm f/2.8
- 135mm f/3.5 (for 4x5")
- 150mm f/2.8
- 210mm f/2.8 (for 5×7" – only five examples made)

=== Tele-Arton ===
The Tele-Arton is a telephoto design. Earlier f/4 and f/5.5 models are 5 elements in 4 groups. The 250 mm f/5.6 is a modern multicoated 5-element, 5-group lens. All models have a 35° angle of coverage.

- 85mm mm f/4 Retina -Tele-Arton for DKL Kodak mount
- 180 mm f/4 (for 6×9 cm)
- 180 mm f/5.5
- 240 mm f/5.5
- 250 mm f/5.6 (for 4×5 in)
- 270 mm f/5.5
- 360 mm f/5.5 (for 5×7 in)

=== Fine-Art XXL ===
The Fine-Art XXL line is designed for ultra-large format shooting, covering 20×24 inches. Both lenses are large and heavy, but are designed with exceptional image quality and a huge 900 mm circle of coverage in mind. The 550 mm lens is a 6/2 construction, giving 78° of coverage, while the 1100 mm lens is 4/4 with 45.7° of coverage. Both lenses are mounted in a Copal 3 shutter, and the longer lens is also available in a barrel mount with Waterhouse stops, if the faster f/14 version is desired.

- 550mm f/11
- 770mm f/14.5
- 1100mm f/22(14)

=== Isconar ===
One of Schneider's original lens designs, a symmetric double gauss design, introduced in 1914.

Also known as the "Jsconar", the lens branding refers to "Joseph Schneider & Company -nar"

=== Radiogon ===
A 4-element, 4-group design.

== Digital lenses ==
=== Digitar ===
The Digitar lenses are designed for use with digital imaging view camera systems, offering focal lengths ideal for the imaging area of digital backs, which are typically smaller than standard sheet film sizes. Digitar lenses also allow excellent results with film as well as digital imagers.

- 47 mm f/5.6
- 60 mm f/4.0
- 80 mm f/4.0
- 90 mm f/4.5
- 100 mm f/5.6
- 120 mm f/5.6
- 150 mm f/5.6

=== WA-Digitar ===
The WA-Digitar is a wide angle lens designed for use with digital imaging systems.

- 28 mm f/2.8

=== M-Digitar ===
The M-Digitars are macro lenses offering 1:1 magnification, designed for use with digital imaging systems. They may also be used with good result with film cameras.

- 80 mm f/5.6
- 120 mm f/5.6

== Copy and macro lenses ==
=== Claron ===
One of the original lens designs.

=== C-Claron ===
The C-Claron, or Copy-Claron, is a family of lenses designed for 1:1 reproduction. The f/4.5 lenses are 4 elements in 3 or 4 groups, the f/5.6 are a 6/4 design, and the f/8 is 8/4. All were supplied from the factory in barrel mount.

The following Claron lens has these markings on the beauty ring Cy Ξ Claron 1:1,8/50 1:1,6

- 50mm 1:1,8 1:1,6
- 100mm f/8
- 135mm f/4.5
- 200mm f/4.5
- 200mm f/5.6
- 210mm f/4.5
- 210mm f/5.6
- 240mm f/5.6

=== D-Claron ===
The D-Claron (Dokumentations-Claron) is a lens family designed for copying of documents onto microfilm.

- 10mm f/1.8 (for 16mm)
- 16mm f/5.6
- 25mm f/1.4
- 28mm f/2
- 30mm f/3.5
- 35mm f/2
- 40mm f/2
- 45mm f/3.5
- 60mm f/5.6 (for 35mm)
- 100mm f/4.0
- 105mm f/5.6 (for 70mm)
- 180mm f/5.6
- 210mm f/5.6 (for 105mm)

=== G-Claron ===
The Grafik-Clarons are 6-element, 4-group, symmetrical plasmat-type lenses with a 64° angle of coverage, designed for 1:1 flat-field reproduction, but can be used as macro lenses at magnifications up to 5:1 as well. It is recommended to stop down to at least than f/22 for use at infinity. They are available in barrel mount, as well as mounted in shutters.

Coverage listed at 1:1

- 150mm f/9 (for 8x10")
- 210mm f/9 (for 11x14")
- 240mm f/9 (for 14x17")
- 270mm f/9 (for 16x20")
- 305mm f/9
- 355mm f/9 (for 20x24")
- 355mm f/11 Copal No. 1

=== G-Claron WA ===
A wide-angle process lens with 4 elements in 4 groups, optimized for reproduction ratios between 2:1 and 1:2. The 270 mm lens has an angle of coverage of 72°, the 240 mm has 80°, and the 210 mm has 86°, which give these lenses gigantic image circles, though the image softens considerably near the edges of coverage.

- 210mm f/11 (for 20×24 in)
- 240mm f/11 (for 16×20 in)
- 270mm f/11 (for 20×24 in)

=== Repro-Claron ===
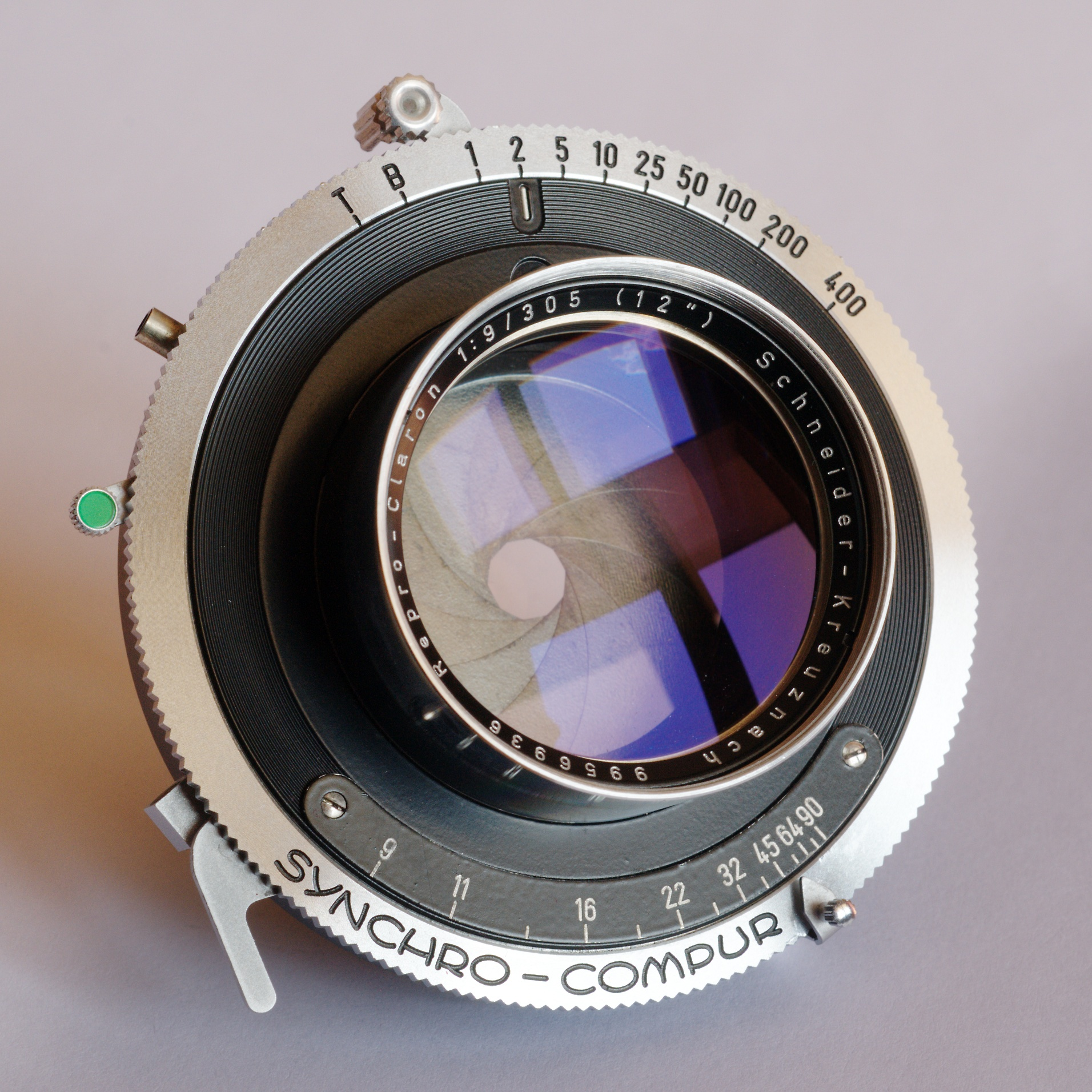
Repro-Claron 305 mm f/9, mounted on a Synchro-Compur shutter.

The Repro-Claron is a line of 4-element, 4-group lenses optimized for 1:1 reproduction ratios, but still usable at infinity. The f/9 lenses also have a slot for between-the-lens filtration or Waterhouse stops, the latter of which are available in f/128, f/180, and f/260.

- 55mm f/8
- 135mm f/8
- 210mm f/9
- 305mm f/9
- 355mm f/9
- 420mm f/9
- 485mm f/9
- 610mm f/9

=== Apo-Artar ===
Apo-Artar lenses are an apochromatic symmetrical 4-element design, which is optimized for 1:1 reproduction. These lenses give 46° of coverage up to 480mm, 40° in 890-1065mm, and 38° in 1205mm.

Coverage listed at 1:1.

- 240mm f/9 (for 4×5")
- 360mm f/9 (for 11×14")
- 480mm f/11 (for 11x14")
- 610mm f/11 (for 20x24")
- 890mm f/14 (for 30x40")
- 1065mm f/14 (for 33x46")
- 1205mm f/14 (for 40x50")

=== Apo-Artar HM ===
Apo-Artar HM lenses are an apochromatic symmetrical 6-element design, which is optimized for 1:1 reproduction. The HM in the name indicates that these lenses use high-modulation glass elements.

- 75mm f/4 (up to 6x7 cm)

=== Macro-Symmar HM ===
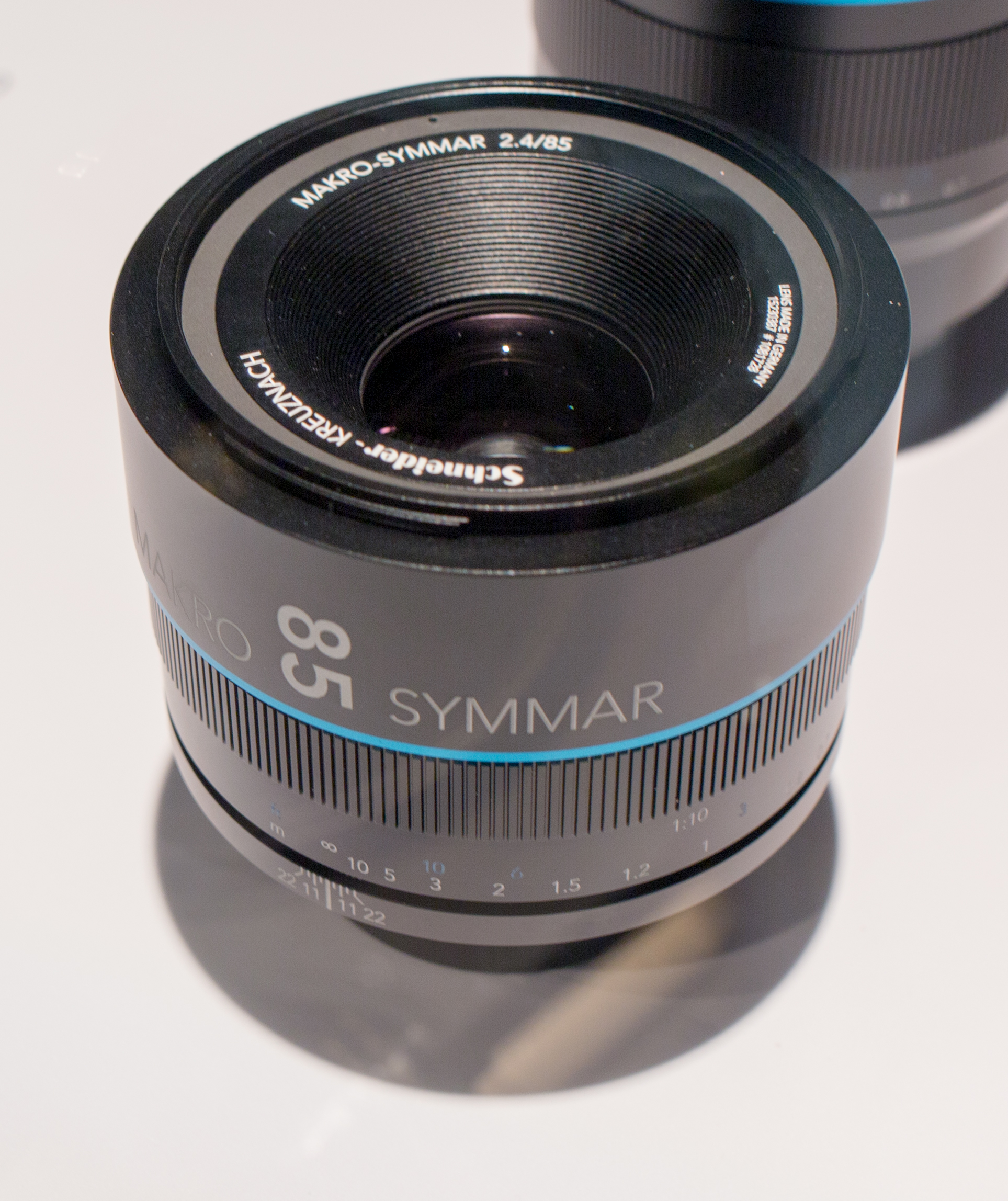
Schneider-Kreuznach MACRO-SYMMAR 2.4/85

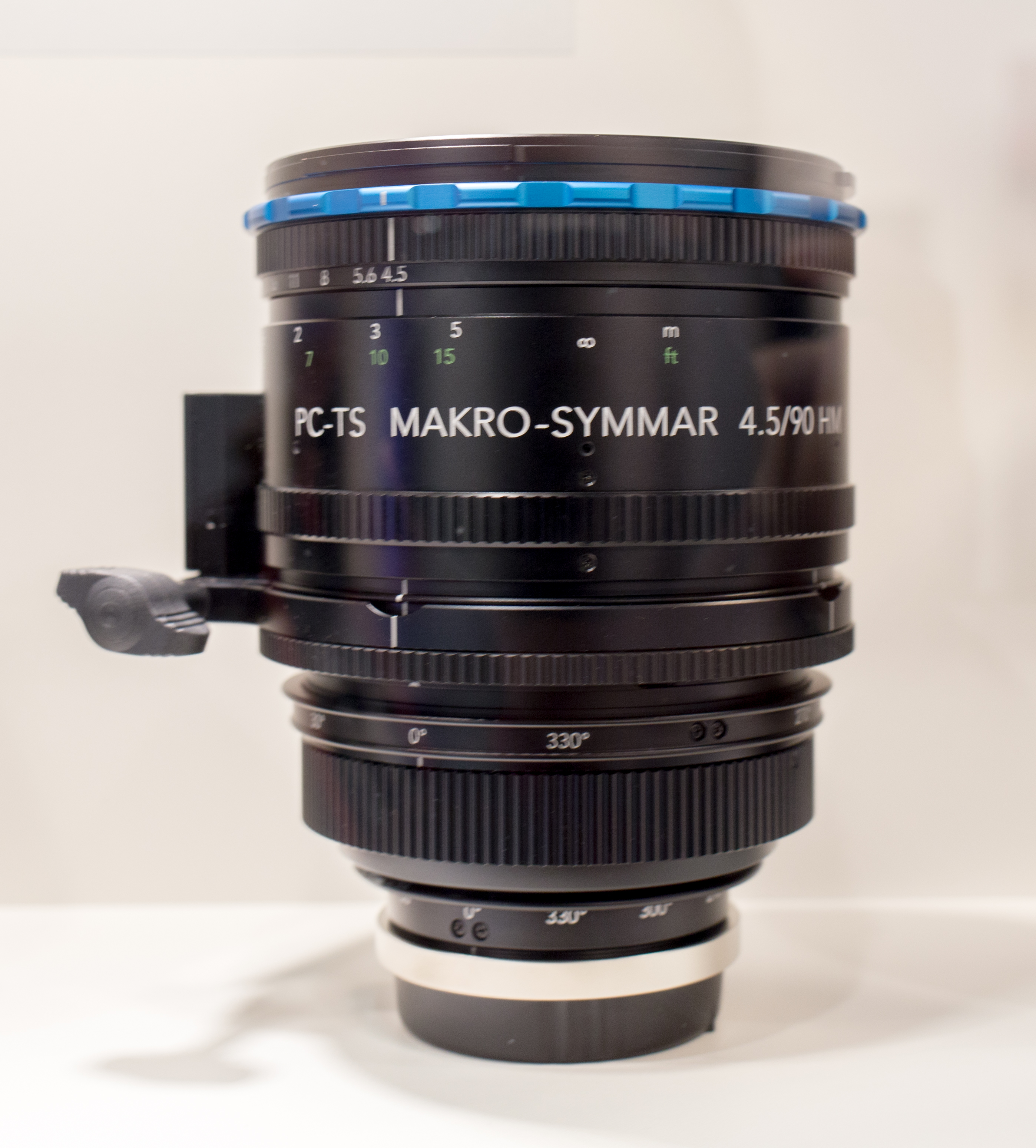
Schneider-Kreuznach TS 90mm lens

The Macro-Symmar HM is a variation of the Symmar design, engineered for 1:1 macro work and flat-field copying. The 80 mm is a 6-element, 4-group lens with a 47° angle of coverage, while the other lenses in the line are 8-element, 4-group designs with 55° of coverage. The HM in the name indicates that these lenses use high-modulation glass elements.

- 85 f/2.4 HM (for 24×36 mm) for Canon EF and Nikon F mount (2014)
- 80mm f/5.6 (for 6×9 cm)
- 90 f/4.5 HM for Canon EF and Nikon F mount (2014)
- 120mm f/5.6 (for 5×7 in)
- 180mm f/5.6 (for 8×10 in)

=== M-Componon ===
The M-Componon is a special-purpose macro (makro) lens, designed for greater than 1:1 reproduction.

- 28mm f/4 (4:1 ~ 20:1)
- 50mm f/4 (2:1 ~ 12:1)
- 80mm f/4 (1:1 ~ 7:1)

=== Variomorphot ===
A process lens with 12 elements in 8 groups and a fixed aperture, optimized for a 1:1 reproduction ratio. It has the capability of altering the aspect ratio of the image by up to 8% without any image degradation.

- 480mm f/22 (for 18×20 in)

== Enlarger lenses ==
These lenses are designed for work with a photographic enlarger. They have barrel mounts and many current models feature glow-in-the-dark aperture scales.

=== Componar ===
This is the original Schneider line of enlarging lenses, introduced in 1914. Optical designs are 3 elements in 3 groups.

- 26 mm f/4.5
- 50mm f/3,5( for 35mm)
- 50 mm f/4 (for 35 mm)
- 50 mm f/4.5
- 60 mm f/4 (for 4×4 cm)
- 75 mm f/4.5 (for 6×6 cm)
- 80 mm f/4.5 (for 6×7 cm)
- 105 mm f/4.5 (for 6×9 cm)
- 135 mm f/4.5 (for 4×5 in)

=== Componar-C ===
A 3-element, 3-group line of enlarging lenses, optimized for enlargements up to 8×.

- 50mm f/2.8 (for 24x36mm)
- 75mm f/4 (for 6×6 cm)

=== Componar-S ===
This was the original high-end enlarging lens line, the Componar-Satz. This is the currently available low-end enlarging lens line. They are 4-element, 3-group designs, and optimized for enlargements in the 6×-10× range.

- 50 mm f/2.8
- 80 mm f/4.5
- 90 mm f/4.5
- 105 mm f/4.5

=== Comparon ===
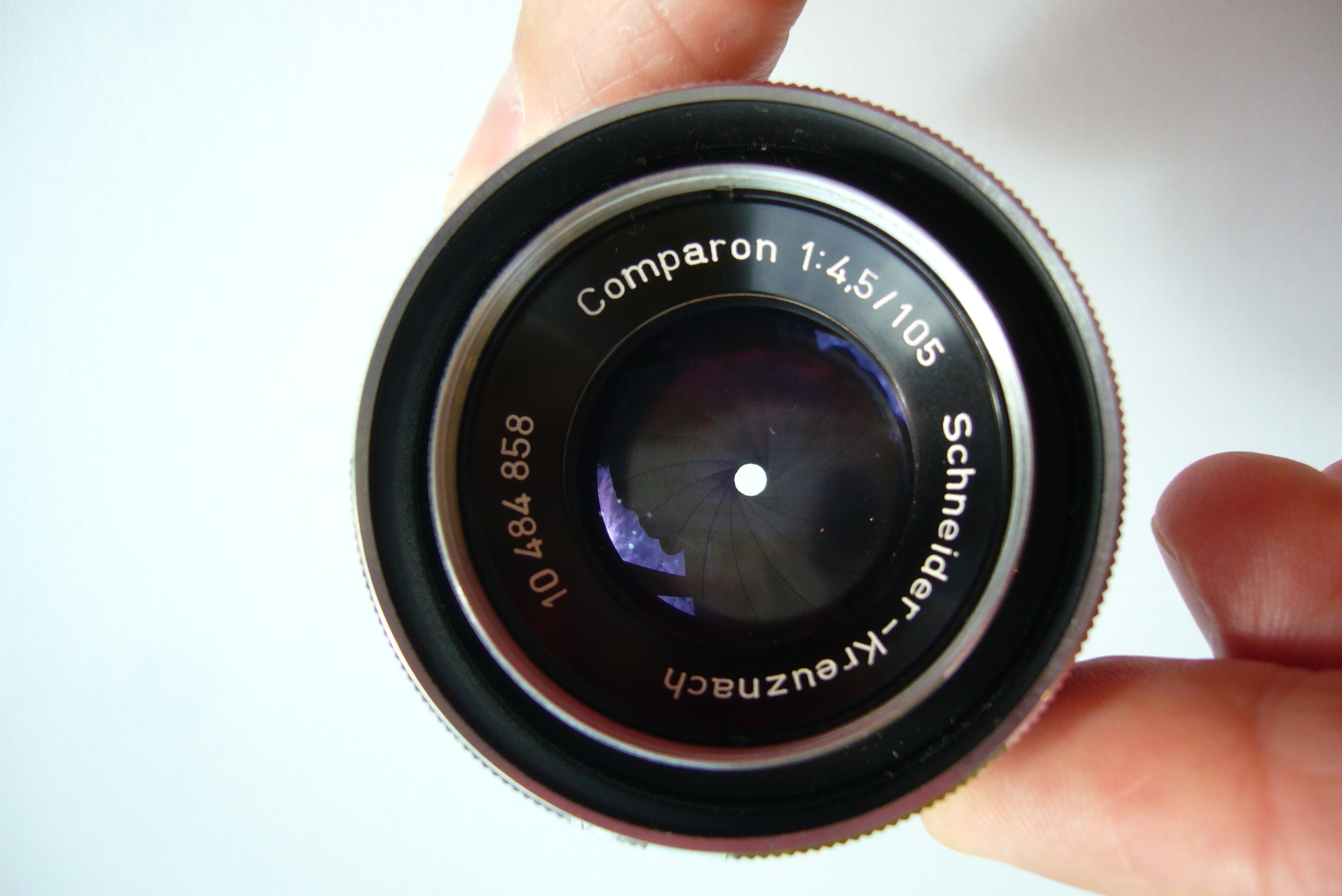
An F4.5/105mm Comparon lens used for making photographic enlargements

A middle-grade line of enlarging optics. They are 4-element, 3-group, Tessar-based designs, and optimized for enlargements in the 2×-6× range.

- 50mm f/3.5 (for 24x36mm)
- 50mm f/4
- 75mm f/4.5 (for 6×6 cm)
- 105mm f/4.5 (for 6×9 cm)
- 135mm f/4.5 (for 4×5")
- 150mm f/5.6
- 210mm f/5.6 (for 5×7")
- 300mm f/5.6 (for 8×10")

=== Componon ===
The Componon is a high-quality enlarging lens line. These models have been largely superseded by the Componon-S units, though a few Componon lenses are still manufactured today. Optical designs are 6 elements in 4 groups, and they are optimized for >10× enlargements.

- 16 mm f/2.8
- 25 mm f/4
- 28 mm f/4 (for 18×24 mm)
- 35 mm f/4 (for 126 film)
- 40 mm f/4 (for 24x24 mm)
- 40 mm f/5.6 24mm threaded
- 50 mm f/4 (for 24x36 mm)
- 60 mm f/5.6 (for 4×4 cm)
- 80 mm f/5.6 (for 6×6 cm)
- 100 mm f/5.6 (for 6×7 cm)
- 105 mm f/5.6 (for 6×9 cm)
- 135 mm f/5.6 (for 4×5 in)
- 150 mm f/5.6 (for 4×5 in)
- 180 mm f/5.6 (for 5×7 in)
- 210 mm f/5.6 (for 5×7 in)
- 240 mm f/5.6 (for 8×10 in)
- 300 mm f/5.6 (for 24×30 cm)
- 360 mm f/5.6 (for 30×40 cm)

=== Durst Componon- ===
- 50 mm f/4.0 (Durst Componon printed on beauty ring - Durst in red - black lens barrel)
- 50 mm f/4.0 (Componon printed on beauty ring - Durst printed is Script letters on the silver barrel next to the abbreviation Pat. different design than black barrel version)
- 80 mm f/5.6 (Durst Componon printed on beauty ring - Durst in red - black lens barrel)
- 80 mm f/5.6 (Durst Componon printed on beauty ring - Durst in red - silver lens barrel of a different design than the black version)
- 105 mm f5.6 (Durst Componon printed on beauty ring - Durst in red -black lens barrel)
- 105 mm f5.6 (Durst Componon printed on beauty ring - Durst in red - barrel is silver rather than black. Different design than black barreled version)
- 150 mm f5.6 (Durst Componon printed on beauty ring - Durst in red - black lens barrel)
- 210 mm f5.0 (Durst Componon printed on beauty ring - Durst in red - black lens barrel looks like a large format lens design)

=== Componon-S ===
These are high quality enlarger lenses which are updated versions of the Componon line. Most are 6-element, 4-group lenses except for the 50mm F2.8 which was originally released as a 5-element, 4-group design but which changed (from serial number ...?) to a 6-element, 4-group design. They are corrected for flatness of field, contrast, and color rendition.

- 50 mm f/2.8 (for 35 mm)
- 80 mm f/4 (for 6×6 cm)
- 80 mm f/5.6
- 100 mm f/5.6 (for 6×9 cm)
- 105 mm f/5.6
- 135 mm f/5.6 (for 4×5 in)
- 150 mm f/5.6 (for 4×5 in)
- 180 mm f/5.6 (for 5×7 in)
- 210 mm f/5.6 (for 5×7 in)
- 240 mm f/5.6 (for 8×10 in)
- 300 mm f/5.6 (for 24×30 cm)
- 360 mm f/6.8 (for 10x12 in)

=== WA-Componon ===
A 6-element, 4-group line of wide-angle enlarging lenses.

- 40mm f/4 (for 24x36mm)
- 60mm f/5.6 (for 6×6 cm)
- 80mm f/5.6 (for 6×9 cm)

=== G-Componon ===
A 6-element, 4-group line of lenses optimized for enlargements above 20×.

- 100 mm f/5.6 (for 6×9 cm)
- 150 mm f/5.6 (for 4×5 in)
- 210 mm f/5.6 (for 5×7 in)
- 240 mm f/5.6
- 300 mm f/5.6 (for 8×10 in)
- 360 mm f/6.8
- 480 mm f/9.4 (for 24×30 cm)

=== APO-Componon HM ===
These are 6-element, 4-group apochromatic enlarger lenses, using high-modulation glass elements, designed for critical color rendition and precision industrial applications.

- 40 mm f/2.8
- 44 mm f4.5
- 45 mm f/4
- 60 mm f/4
- 90 mm f/4.5
- 120 mm f/5.6
- 150 mm f/4

=== Betavaron ===
The Betavaron is a zoom enlarging lens for 35 mm film. The relative positions of the negative, paper easel, and lens remain fixed, while the magnification setting of the lens is changed to alter the degree of enlargement. The design is 11 elements. The Betavaron 3...10, the base model, is limited to 3.1–10× magnification, with a maximum aperture of f/4.1-f/5.6 (the aperture changes slightly with the magnification). Adding a supplementary −0.9 diopter lens turns the unit into a Betavaron 5,3...17, and changes the magnification range to 5.3–17×, and the maximum aperture to f/5.4-f/5.7.

- 3.0mm - 10mm - 0.08 (zoom / macro capability)
- 3.5mm - 11mm - 0.08 (zoom / macro capability)

=== =Repronar ===
- 110mm apertures shown on ring as 1 2 4 8 16 Lens has the brand designation Schneider Gottingen. Thread mount

== Motion picture lenses ==
Schneider produced its first cinema projection lenses in 1915.

=== Cinegon ===
- 5.3mm f2 CCD close circuit camera lens
- 6.5mm f1.9 (D-mount)
- 10mm f 1.8 (16mm format)
- 10mm f 1.9 (C-mount - used for industrial applications)
- 11.5mm f1.9
- 16mm f1.4 C-mount, Arriflex
- 16mm f1.8 C-mount Ruggedized
- 18mm f1.8 Arriflex-Cinegon, Arriflex standard mount

=== Super-Cinelux ===
A range of projection lenses for 35mm and 70mm motion picture film with an aperture of f/2.

- 24 mm f/2 (for 35 mm)
- 26 mm f/2
- 28 mm f/2
- 30 mm f/2
- 32.5 mm f/2
- 35 mm f/2
- 37.5 mm f/2
- 40 mm f/2
- 42.5 mm f/2
- 45 mm f/2
- 47.5 mm f/2
- 50 mm f/2
- 52.5 mm f/2
- 55 mm f/2
- 57.7 mm f/2
- 60 mm f/2 (for 35 mm or 70 mm)
- 65 mm f/2
- 70 mm f/2
- 75 mm f/2
- 80 mm f/2
- 85 mm f/2
- 90 mm f/2
- 95 mm f/2
- 100 mm f/2

=== ES Super-Cinelux 2X ===
Available as either anamorphic converters for prime lenses longer than 42.5 mm, or as standalong anamorphic projection lenses, in focal lengths from 42.5 mm to 100 mm.

=== Super-35-Cinelux ===
The Super-35-Cinelux is a line of projection lenses designed for 35 mm film. Lenses of 55 mm focal length and shorter are 7 elements, and 60 and longer are 6, with no cemented surfaces to avoid any possible damage due to heat.

- 42.5 mm f/2
- 47.5 mm f/2
- 50 mm f/2
- 55 mm f/2
- 60 mm f/2
- 65 mm f/2
- 70 mm f/2
- 75 mm f/2
- 80 mm f/2
- 85 mm f/2
- 90 mm f/2
- 95 mm f/2
- 100 mm f/2

=== Cinelux-Ultra ===
- 30–45 mm

=== Cinelux-Première ===
A projection lens incorporating aspheric elements to correct for spherical aberration. They feature a variable aperture with an aperture range from f/1.7 to f/4. These are available in normal or anamorphic models.

- 57.5 mm f/1.7
- 60 mm f/1.7
- 62.5 mm f/1.7
- 65 mm f/1.7
- 67.5 mm f/1.7
- 70 mm f/1.7
- 72.5 mm f/1.7
- 75 mm f/1.7
- 77.5 mm f/1.7
- 80 mm f/1.7
- 82.5 mm f/1.7
- 85 mm f/1.7

=== Cine-Xenon ===
A 6-element double gauss lens.

- 25 mm f1.4 Cine-Xenon RX for C-mount
- 26 mm f/2.8
- 30 mm f/2
- 35 mm f/2 for Arriflex
- 35 mm f/2.8
- 40 mm f/2
- 45 mm f/2
- 45 mm f/2.8
- 50 mm f/2
- 50 mm f/2 for Bolex
- 50 mm f/2.8
- 55 mm f/2
- 60 mm f/2
- 60 mm f/2.8
- 65 mm f/2
- 70 mm f/2
- 75 mm f/2
- 80 mm f/2
- 85 mm f/2
- 90 mm f/2
- 90 mm f/2.5
- 95 mm f/2
- 100 mm f/2
- 105 mm f/2
- 105 mm f/2.4
- 110 mm f/2
- 115 mm f/2
- 120 mm f/2
- 125 mm f/2
- 130 mm f/2
- 135 mm f/2
- 140 mm f/2
- 145 mm f/2
- 150 mm f/2
- 150 mm f/2.8

Note that some Xenon formula lenses sold for motion picture use are marked 'Xenon' rather than 'Cine-Xenon'.

Cine-Xenon also refers to projection lenses of the same design.

For 16mm

- 10 mm f/1.8
- 16 mm f/2.0
- 70 mm f/2.0

Cine-Tele-Xenar For 16mm

- 150 mm f4.0 (C-mount for Bolex)

=== Vario-Cine-Xenon ===
A variable-focal-length projection lens for 35mm slides.

- 85–210 mm f/3.9

=== Optivaron ===
- 6–66 mm f/1.8 C-mount zoom lens (1.5 m to inf.) with macro control from 0 to 1.5 meters (0 to 59 inches)

=== PC Cine-Xenon ===
A 6-element projection lens for 35mm slides with perspective control, to eliminate problems with cross-fading multiple projectors.

- 45 mm f/2.8
- 60 mm f/2.8
- 90 mm f/2.8
- 105 mm f/2.9

=== Prolux ===
Long focal-length projection lenses for 35mm slides.

- 135 mm f/3
- 150 mm f/3
- 180 mm f/3.5
- 200 mm f/3.5
- 250 mm f/4.3

=== Vario-Prolux ===
Variable-focal-length projection lenses for 35mm slides.

- 70–120 mm f/3.5

=== Variogon ===
A variable-focal-length lens of 13 elements in 9 groups, originally introduced in 1959, after two years of development.

- 8–48 mm f/1.8 (for 8 mm D mount)
- 10–40 mm f/2.8
- 10-35 mm f1.8 (zoom lens for 8mm movie camera - C mount)
- 10-100 mm f/1.8 C mount CCD lens
- 12.5-75 mm f1.8 (zoom lens for C mount)

=== Xenon FF ===
- 25 mm T2.1 Tilt Shift lens for cinema
- 35 mm T2.1 Tilt Shift lens for cinema
- 50 mm T2.1 Tilt Shift lens for cinema
- 100 mm T2.1 Tilt Shift lens for cinema
- 50 mm T2.1 (Xenon 50 FF Prime printed in large letters around lens barrel - Canon EF mount - not a tilt shift lens)

=== APO-Xenoplan ===
- 16 mm f/2.8

=== Curtar ===
- 0.5x projector lens silver AGFA Moviex 88
- 0.5x projector lens black

=== Vario-Curtar ===
- 0.75x projector lens black with zebra bars around lens barrel - Schneider Kreuznach Vario-Curtar 0.75 x is printed around the beauty ring
- 0.75x projector lens black different lens barrel design - shorter than the above listed zebra lens. Schneider Kreuznach Vario-Curtar 0.75 x is printed around the outside of the lens barrel near the main lens element.

=== Titanar ===
- 35mm mm f/2.0 marked Schneider Kreuznach Titanar 35/2 apparently a type of industrial lens?

=== Xenoplan ===
- 8 mm f/1.7 (C mount)
- 11 mm f5 (C mount)
- 13 mm f1.9 (for 8mm movie camera - D mount)
- 17 mm f1.7 (for M 25 mount)
- 21 mm f6.7
- 23 mm f1.4 Industrial camera CCTV lens
- 25 mm f1.9 (C mount for Bolex movie camera)
- 28 mm f2.0

== Lenses for various mobile phones ==
- LG Dare
- LG Viewty KU990
- LG Renoir KC910
- LG Viewty Smart GC900
- LG enV Touch
- LG Arena KM900
- LG Shine KE970
- BlackBerry Priv

== Gallery ==
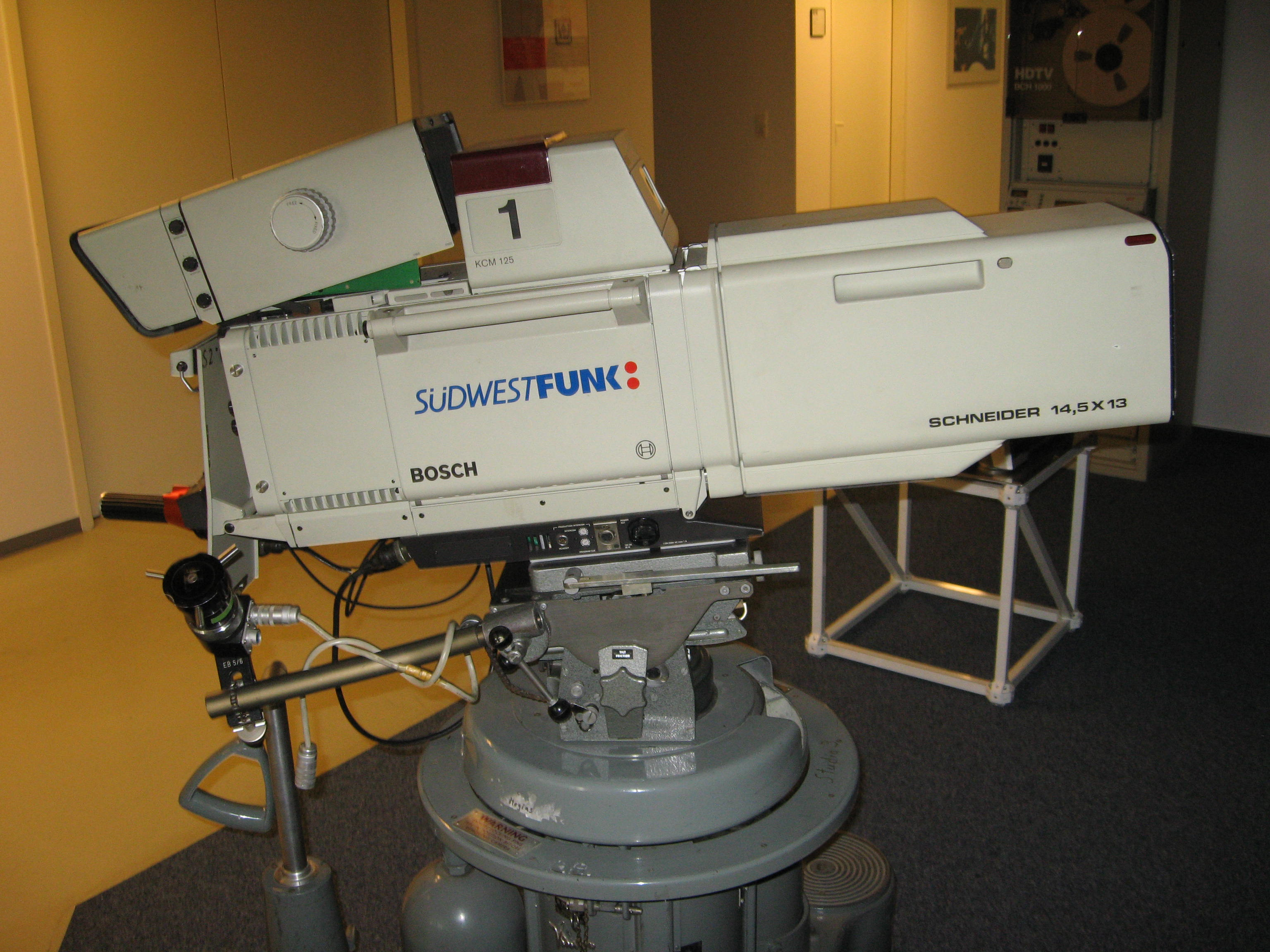
Bosch Fernseh KCM-125 professional video camera with a Schneider Optics Lens.
