= Patrick Whitehouse =

English railway preservation pioneer

Patrick Whitehouse OBE
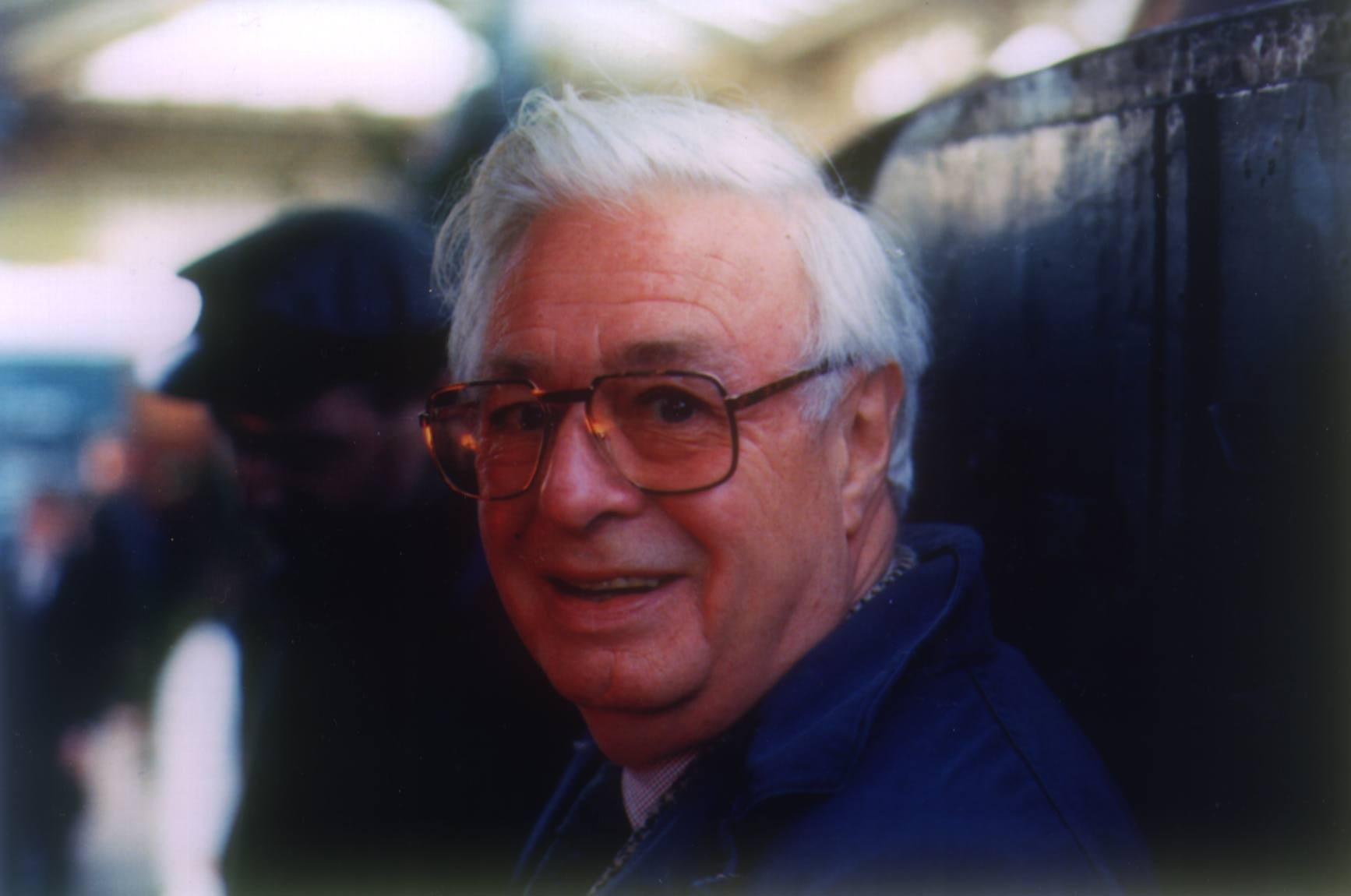
- Born: 25 February 1922; Warwick, England
- Died: 17 July 1993 (aged 71)
- Education: Warwick School
- Occupations: RAF officer (navigator); Construction company owner
- Years active: 1939-1993?
- Known for: Construction safety; Railway preservation
- Notable work: Birmingham Railway Museum
- Children: Michael, Maggy
- Awards: Officer of the Order of the British Empire

Patrick Bruce Whitehouse OBE (25 February 1922 – 17 July 1993) was one of the pioneers of railway preservation, when he helped save the Talyllyn Railway in 1951. He also led the restoration to working order of several of Britain's steam locomotives after they were replaced by diesel locomotion in the 1960s.

== Early life ==
Patrick Bruce Whitehouse was born in Warwick, the son of Cecil Whitehouse who was the co-owner of the family construction firm B. Whitehouse and Sons based in Birmingham, West Midlands and his wife Phyllis (née Bucknell), who was a descendant of the founding family of the shipping line that became the Ellerman & Bucknell Steamship Company.

== Career ==
=== RAF: 1939–1945 ===
Educated at Warwick School, on graduation he was due to join the family firm, but the outbreak of World War II meant that he tried to follow his ambition of becoming a pilot. With less than perfect eyesight, the Royal Air Force approved his training as a navigator, which he completed in Canada under the Empire Air Training Scheme. Returning to the UK he was posted to No. 15 Squadron RAF, completing three tours each of 30 flights over Nazi Germany and occupied western-Europe.

Assigned to RAF Transport Command, he was then posted by them to what was considered the less stressful Middle East. Shot down over the Mediterranean, he was the sole survivor of a crew of four, picked up four days later from his RAF issue rubber dinghy by a Greek freighter. By the time of his demobilisation in 1946, he had reached the rank of Squadron Leader.

=== Construction: 1946–1970 ===
Post-WW2, Whitehouse returned to the family firm, initially becoming number three behind his father and uncle. He succeeded his uncle as chairman, but sold the business in 1964 to Holland, Hannen & Cubitts Ltd. This allowed him to serve on their board until 1971, being appointed Officer of the Order of the British Empire (OBE) in the 1967 Birthday Honours for his campaign for safety regulations on building sites.

== Railway preservation ==
Whitehouse was a member of what later became chronicled as the "Birmingham Railway Mafia", a group centred around a core of steam railway enthusiasts who were members of both the Birmingham Locomotive Club and West Midlands branch of the Stephenson Locomotive Society.

Newly married, Whitehouse bought a Rolleiflex camera, and began chronicling the demise of steam and the railways in some of his favourite railway locations in the West Midlands. These were supplemented by photographs from SLS tours organised by the Birmingham Mafia, including one Whitehouse co-arranged on the Ashover Light Railway, Derbyshire. Inspired by H Fayle's book Narrow Gauge Railways of Ireland, Whitehouse and his wife toured Ireland in the summers of the early 1950s, in 1952 accompanied by fellow publisher Ian Allan, with the group especially enjoying chasing trains along the Tralee and Dingle Railway. These tours are also where Whitehouse met fellow enthusiasts who would later play a key role in preservation of the UK's steam railway heritage, including Ivo Peters, Henry S Orbach and Peter Allen, later knighted for his chairmanship of Imperial Chemical Industries. With a good volume and sufficient personal confidence in his own photographic ability, in the mid-1950s Whitehouse submitted a selected portfolio to the Royal Photographic Society, and in 1958 co-authored with John Powell published a book on the Tralee & Dingle.

=== Talyllyn Railway ===
In 1950, the Talyllyn Railway, a narrow gauge slate railway in mid-Wales, was on the brink of closure following the death of its owner Sir Henry Haydn Jones. A number of railway enthusiasts from Birmingham (known as the "Birmingham Railway Mafia"), formed a group in an attempt to save the railway. On 11 October 1950, Whitehouse's friend Tom Rolt called a meeting at the Imperial Hotel, Birmingham which led to the formation of the Talyllyn Railway Preservation Society (TRPS), the world's first railway preservation society. Whitehouse attended the founding meeting and accepted the position of Secretary of the preservation society. He later became vice-president of the society, using his knowledge of civil engineering to help preserve and develop the permanent way, and became a skilled steam locomotive fireman on the line.

In the mid-1950s, a number of Whitehouse's Talyllyn friends formed a group to attempt a revival of the Ffestiniog Railway in North Wales, and Whitehouse contributed to this preservation effort as well. In 1968, a group of business people, including Whitehouse, made an offer to BR to purchase the Vale of Rheidol Railway, which was turned down by the Labour Party government.

=== 4555 and the Dart Valley Railway ===
In 1962/3, B Whitehouse & Sons Ltd had been commissioned to rebuild a bridge and walls at Walsall railway station. With the oncoming introduction of diesel and electric services to the area, and subsequent rationalisation and simplification of the required infrastructure, the BR specification changed on numerous occasions resulting in large cost rises. At a subsequent meeting between Whitehouse and the regional manager Stanley Raymond (who as Sir Stanley Raymond, succeeded Dr Richard Beeching as chairman of the Board of British Railways), the cost issues were resolved, and Raymond asked if he could help Whitehouse with anything else. Whitehouse responded that he wanted to buy a steam locomotive, which after within the room discussions with his staff, Raymond agreed to.

Whitehouse and fellow Talyllyn member Pat Garland secured Great Western Railway 4500 Class Small Prairie Tank No.4555 for £750, which included a light overhaul at Swindon Works, a spare boiler, a wagon load of spares and free delivery to Tyseley TMD. Subsequently utilised lightly by BR around the Birmingham area, Whitehouse and his friends wanted to run the locomotive on a GWR branch line. Having originally focused on the already closed GWR Kingswear branch in Devon, with track already being removed they then focused on the Dart Valley Railway from Buckfastleigh to Ashburton. Operated from the outset – as had the Talyllyn and the Ffestiniog – as a commercial railway, in the first year the Dart Valley carried 60,000 passengers at a profit.

=== Clun Castle and Tyseley ===
In 1965, an agreement was made to purchase Castle Class No.7029 Clun Castle from BR for its scrap price of £2,400. In January 1966, Whitehouse and John Evans donated the remaining amount the fund to allow the transaction to be completed.

Clun Castle was purchased by the Standard Gauge Steam Trust. Whitehouse helped secure a lease from BR on part of GWR Tyseley roundhouse which was due to be demolished. The site leased included the coaling stage, ash shelter and watering tower. Dr. Beeching refused permission for the Trust to run their locomotives on the BR mainline so they were limited to the leased motive power depot. The site of the demolished roundhouse, including the surviving turntable - later became part of the Birmingham Railway Museum (BRM), a 16-acre (6.47 ha) site equipped to preserve and maintain main line steam locomotives. Whitehouse led the team which restored the LMS Jubilee Class No.5593 Kolhapur at the BRM. By the 1970s, the BRM housed up to 15 locomotives, and from that time on leased engines to preservation lines throughout Britain. It is now home to the Shakespeare Express which runs on the main line from Birmingham to Stratford-upon-Avon.

=== Photographer, writer and publisher ===
In 1952, with Tom Rolt undertaking the writing and Whitehouse contributing the photographs and research, Whitehouse co-authored his first book "Lines of Character". Five years later he wrote his first solo book "Narrow Gauge Album", published by Ian Allan Publishing. Whitehouse became the author or co-author of 53 books on railways, and built up a collection of more than a quarter of a million photographs of British and foreign railways. In the 1980s, his travels in China led to a long-standing friendship with the China Railway Publishing House in Beijing, and a treaty of friendship between Birmingham and the north-eastern city of Changchun, Manchuria.

Published under the title Millbrook House, the publishers collection of over 250,000 photographs – from both those taken by Whitehouse, and the collections he purchased – became known as the Millbrook House collection. After his death, the majority of the photographs that he took himself known as the Whitehouse Collection was donated to the nation, acquired by the National Railway Museum.

Whitehouse had inherited a Kodak film camera, on which he chronicled his excursions across the UK, Ireland and mainland Europe. In 1956, he produced his first commercial film with John Adams, about the railways of the Isle of Man. Showing the production at a local film club in Birmingham, they met BBC Children's producer Peggy Bacon, who commissioned the two men to present and produce some full-length railway programmes for children. Whitehouse and John Adams subsequently filmed, produced and co-presented the BBC1 Children's programme Railway Roundabout. Although the films still exist, the programme commentaries and links were live to air and unrecorded. Film archivist John Huntley estimated the Whitehouse and Adams were responsible for 137 films, of which around 100 were shown on Railway Roundabout.

== Family ==
His book, China By Rail was co-authored by his daughter Maggy Whitehouse. His son Michael Whitehouse is a lawyer specialising in rail transport, and non-executive director of the Rail Freight Group.
