= Mamiya C220 =

Twin-lens reflex camera model

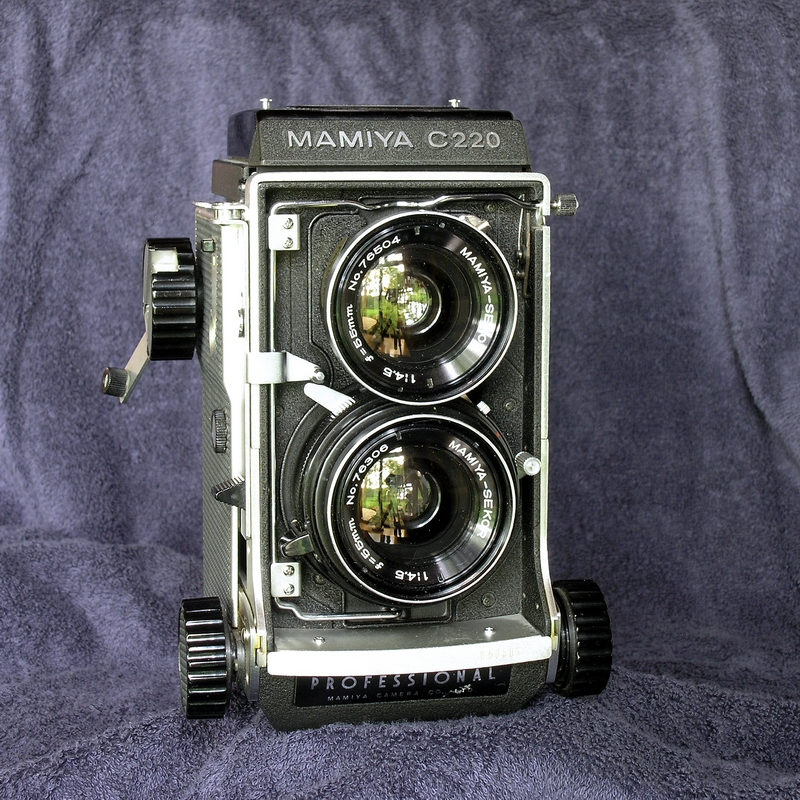
Mamiya C220 with 55 mm wide-angle lens

The Mamiya C220 is a twin-lens reflex camera made in the early 1970s by the Japanese camera manufacturer Mamiya. The camera has interchangeable lenses ranging from 55 mm wide-angle to 250 mm telephoto and accepts 120 and 220 rollfilms. The rack and pinion focusing system with a bellows makes it possible for close-up photography without attachments. The straight film path has no sharp turns for absolute flatness of the film.

Variations of the Mamiya TLR line from the Mamiyaflex to the C330S Professional continued the evolution of the TLR camera with the final TLR, the c330S Pro.

Changeable lenses on medium format SLR and rangefinder cameras such as the Hasselblad line or Koni-Omega Press were the norm. The Mamiya twin lens reflex cameras are among the very few medium-format TLR cameras with interchangeable lenses.

- Dimensions: 118 mm (w) x 167 mm (h) x 113 mm (d)
- Weight: 1.44 kg

== Lenses ==
Mamiya TLR lenses

There are seven Mamiya Sekor lenses:

2 wide-angle lenses
55 mm f/4.5 and 65 mm f/3.5
2 normal lenses
80 mm f/2.8 and 105 mm f/3.5
3 telephoto lenses
135 mm f/4.5, 180 mm f/4.5, and 250 mm f/6.3

Every lens has its own Seikosha shutter system with a shutter speed of B, 1' -1/500 or 1/400 sec, X or M flash synchronisation and bulb mode.

== Gallery of images ==
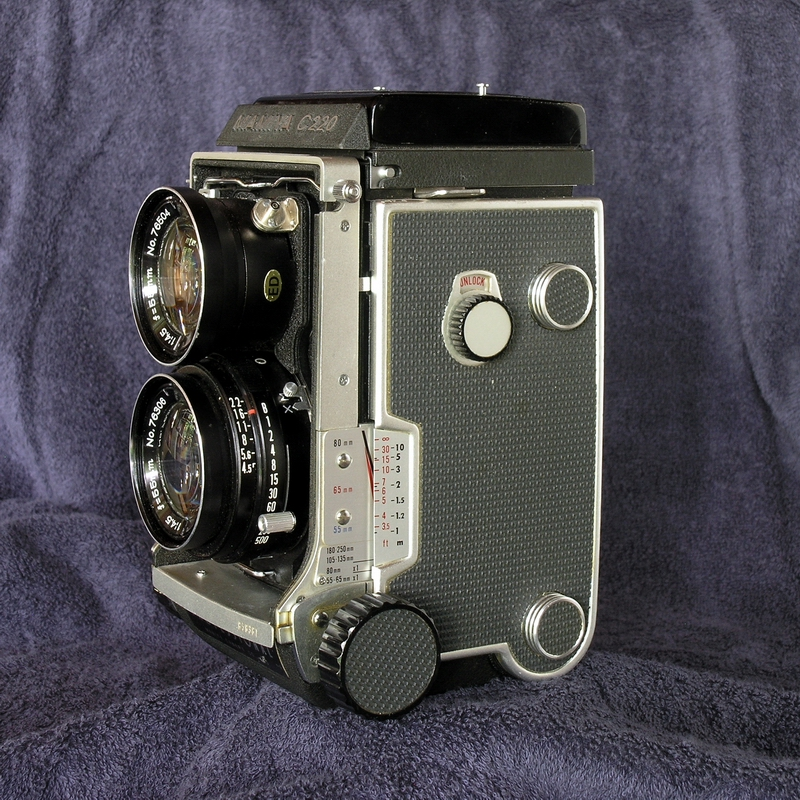
Oblique view with waist-level viewfinder closed

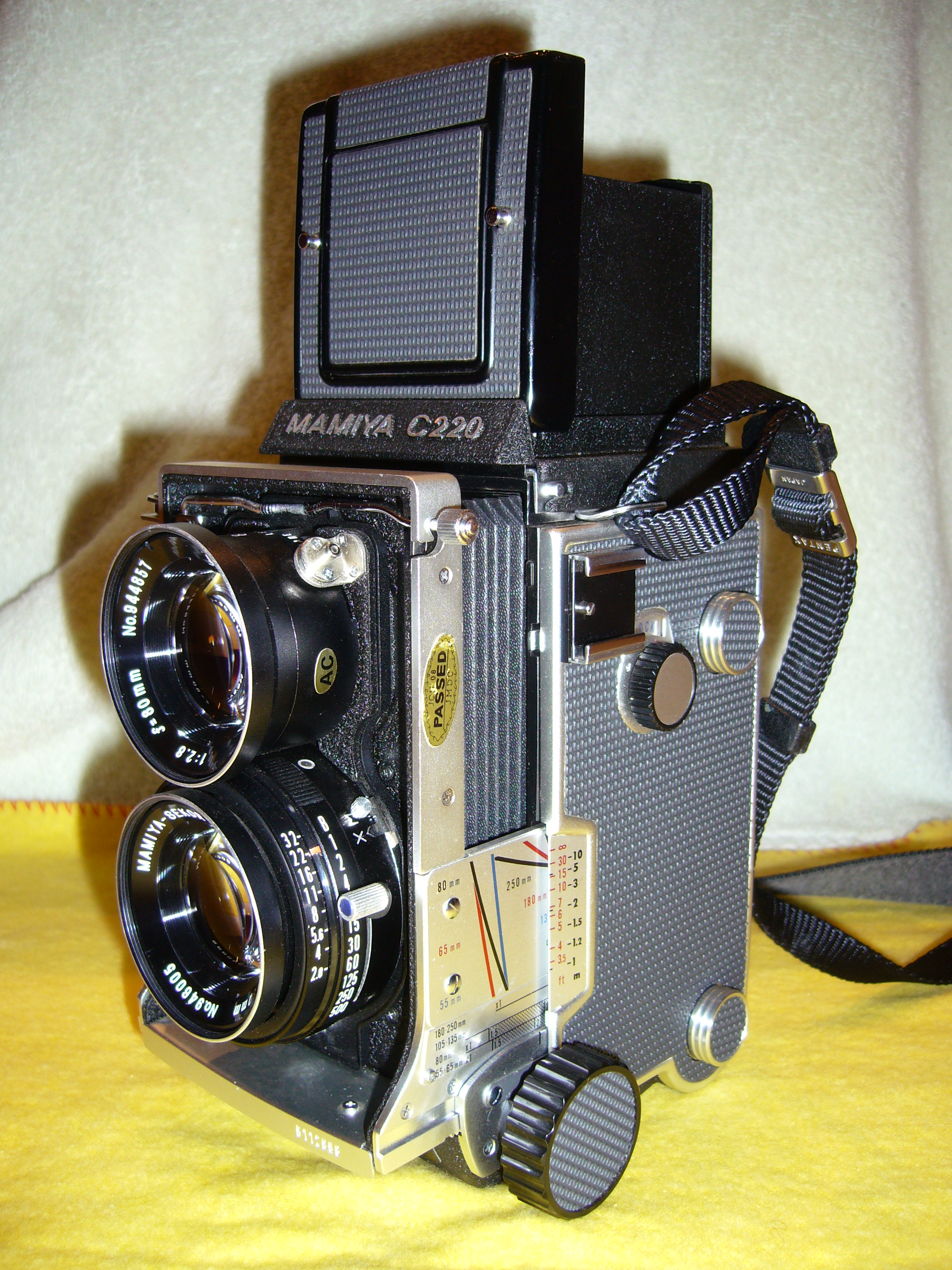
Oblique view with waist-level viewinder open

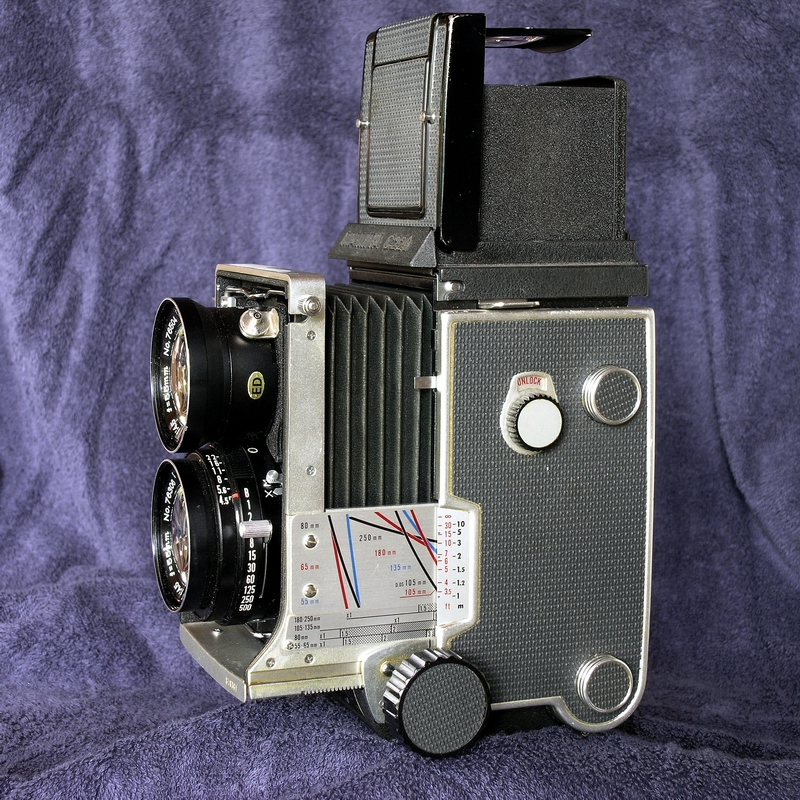
Focussed for a close-up, showing distance scale

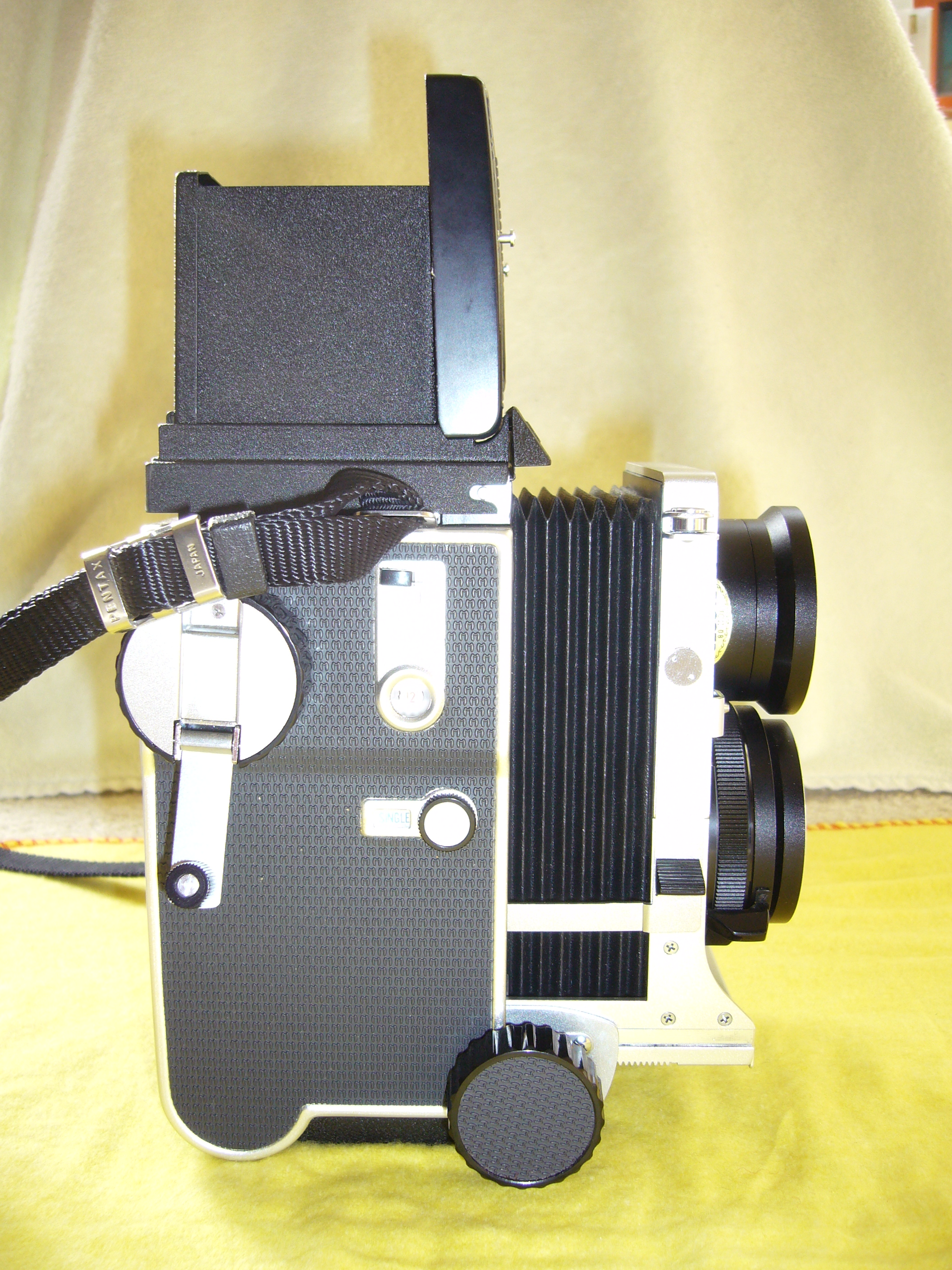
Side view showing film winder

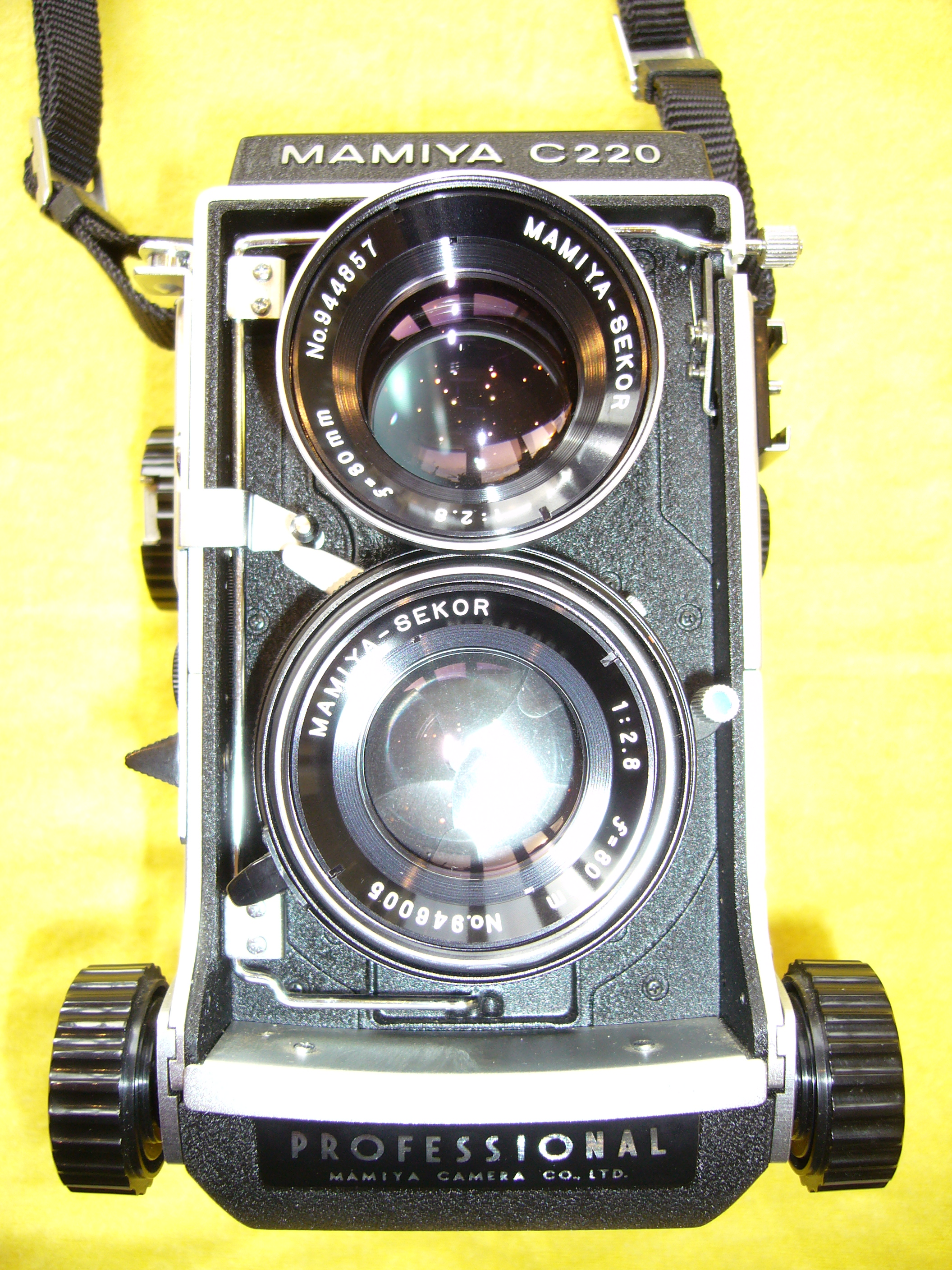
Frontal view showing 80mm standard lens

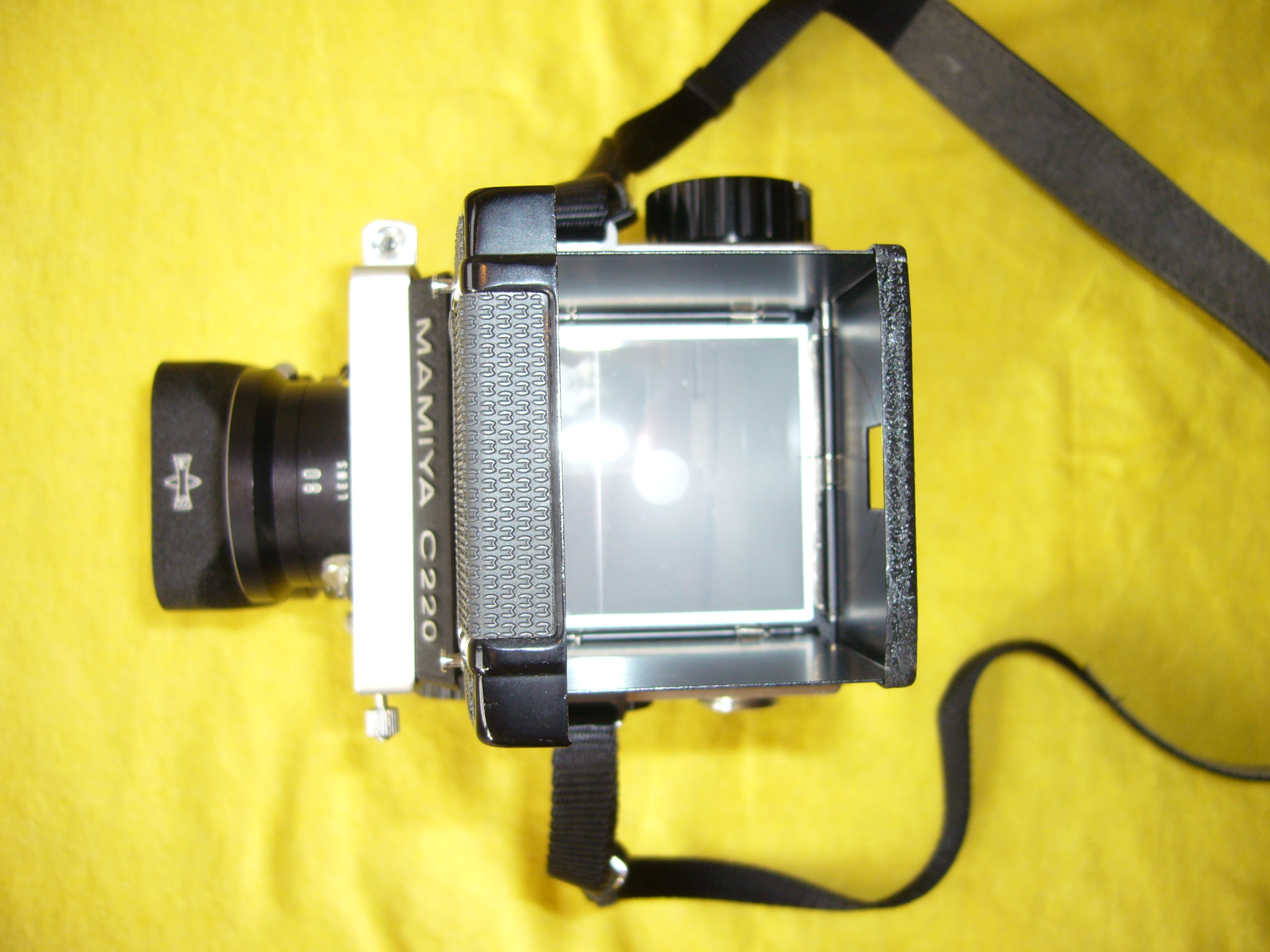
Looking down into the waist-level viewfinder

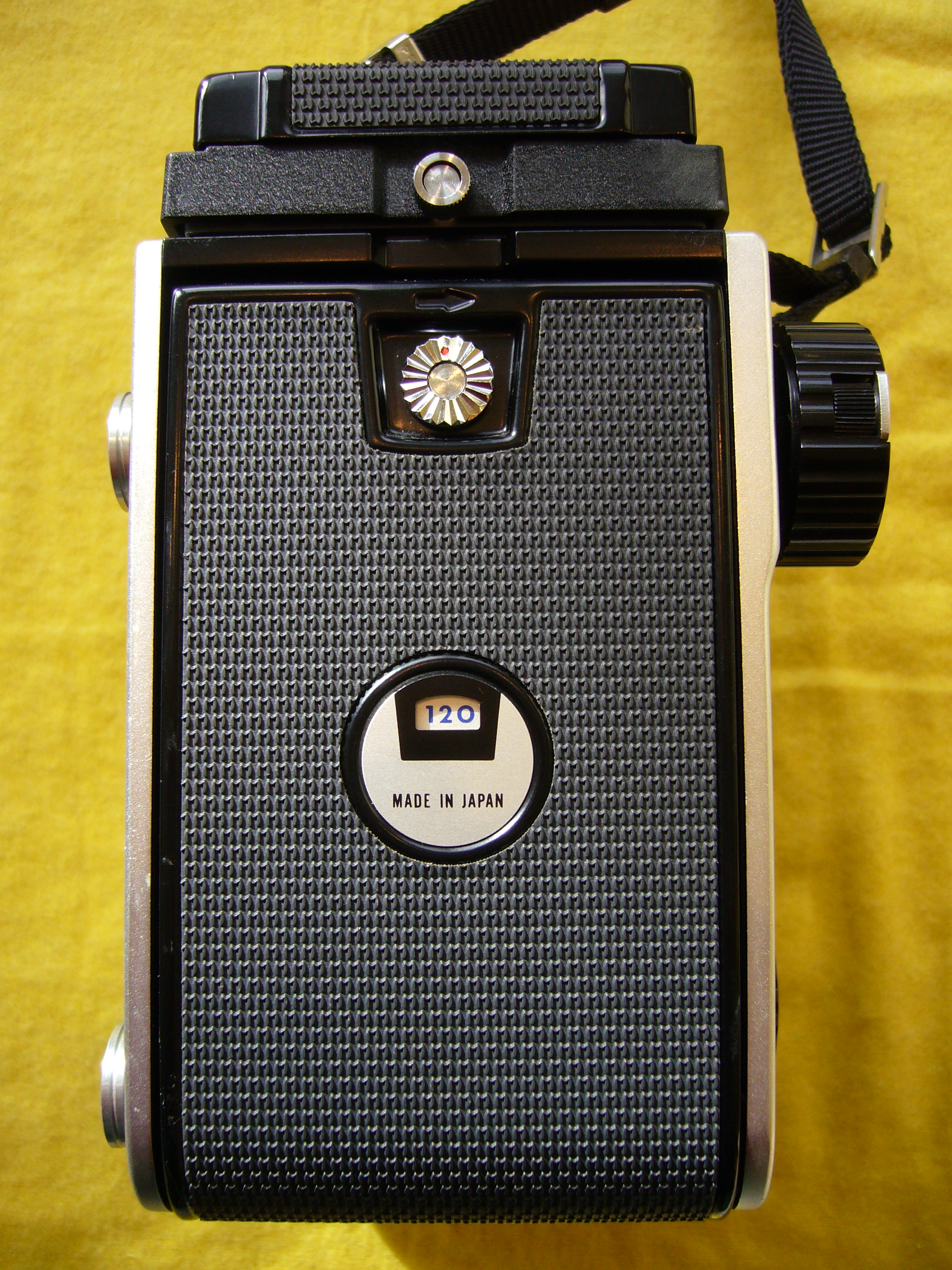
Rear view

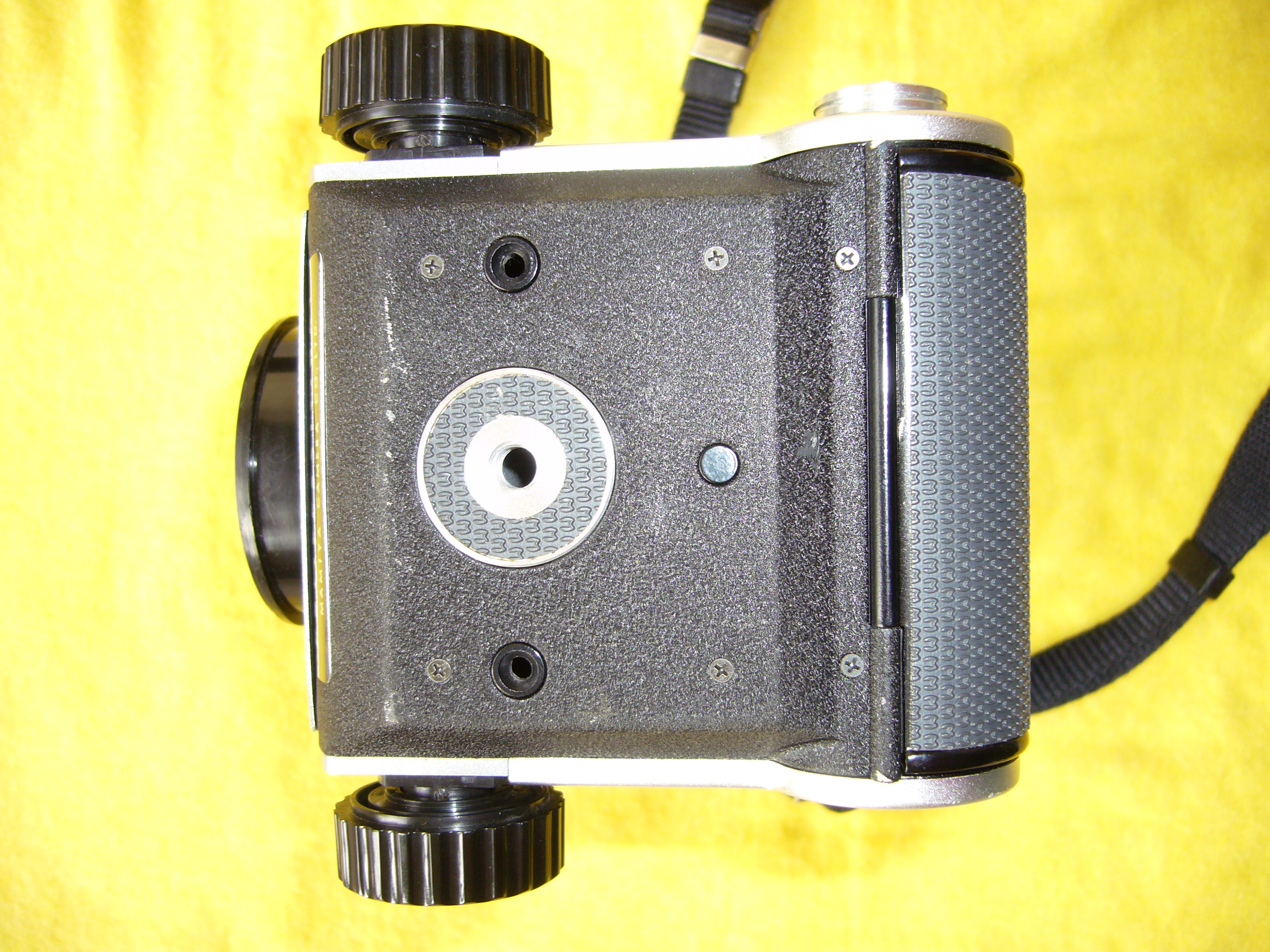
Base view (underneath) showing tripod mount

== See also ==
- Mamiya C330 - uses the same lenses and other accessories
- Mamiyaflex - predecessor model
