= Railway Roundabout (TV series) =

British children's television series

Railway Roundabout is a British children's television series produced by the BBC from 1958 to 1962. Presented by Patrick Whitehouse and John Adams, there were many 15 minute episodes.

Most if not all of the episodes are available on DVD. The majority of these episodes being narrated by Peter Woods.

The programme was commissioned, and some episodes produced, by Peggy Bacon.
