= Twin-lens reflex camera =

Type of camera

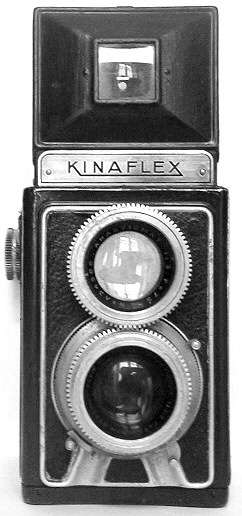
The front of a Kinaflex twin-lens reflex camera. The focus rings of the two lenses are coupled with gears around their circumference in this simple design.

A twin-lens reflex camera (TLR) is a type of camera with two lenses with the same focal length: a viewfinder lens and a taking (or objective) lens, which is usually viewed from above at waist level.

In addition to the objective, the viewfinder consists of a 45-degree mirror (the reason for the word reflex in the name), a matte focusing screen at the top of the camera, and a pop-up hood surrounding it. The two objectives are connected, so that the focus shown on the focusing screen will be exactly the same as on the film. However, many inexpensive "pseudo" TLRs (eg. the Kodak Duaflex) are fixed-focus models to save on the mechanical complexity. Most TLRs use leaf shutters with shutter speeds up to 1/500 of a second with a bulb setting.

For practical purposes, all TLRs are film cameras, most often using 120 film, although there are many examples which used 620 film, 127 film, and 35 mm film. Few general-purpose digital TLR cameras exist, since the heyday of TLR cameras ended long before the era of digital cameras, though they can be adapted with digital backs.

== History ==
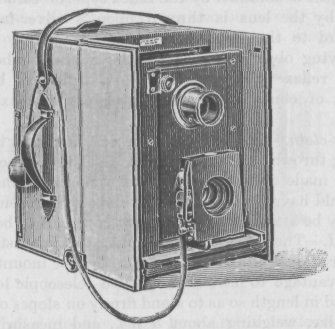
Sketch of an early-20th-century twin-lens reflex camera

In traditional cameras, the photographer first viewed the image on a screen of ground glass in the same place that a photographic plate would be placed. After adjusting the camera and closing the objective aperture the ground glass screen was swapped for the photographic plate, and finally the picture could be taken. With the addition of a second lens and a permanent piece of ground glass, this made it possible for a photographer to snap a picture immediately after focusing the image instead of having to remove and replace the ground glass screen every shot. This advantage of course applies to SLR cameras as well, but early SLR cameras caused delays and inconvenience due to moving the mirror needed for viewfinding out of the optical path to the photographic plate. When this process was automated, the movement of the mirror could cause shake in the camera and blur the image. Using a mirror to allow viewing from above also enabled the camera to be held much more steadily against the body than a camera held with the hands only.

The London Stereoscopic Co's "Carlton" model, dating from 1885, is claimed to be the first off-the-shelf TLR camera. A major step forward to mass marketing of the TLR came with the Rolleiflex in 1929, developed by Franke & Heidecke in Germany. The Rolleiflex was widely imitated and most mass-market TLR cameras owe much to its design. It is said that Reinhold Heidecke had the inspiration for the Rollei TLRs while undertaking photography of enemy lines from the German trenches in 1916, when a periscopic approach to focusing and taking photos radically reduced the risk to the photographer from sniper fire.

TLRs are still manufactured in Germany by DHW Fototechnik, the successor of Franke & Heidecke, in three versions.

== Features ==
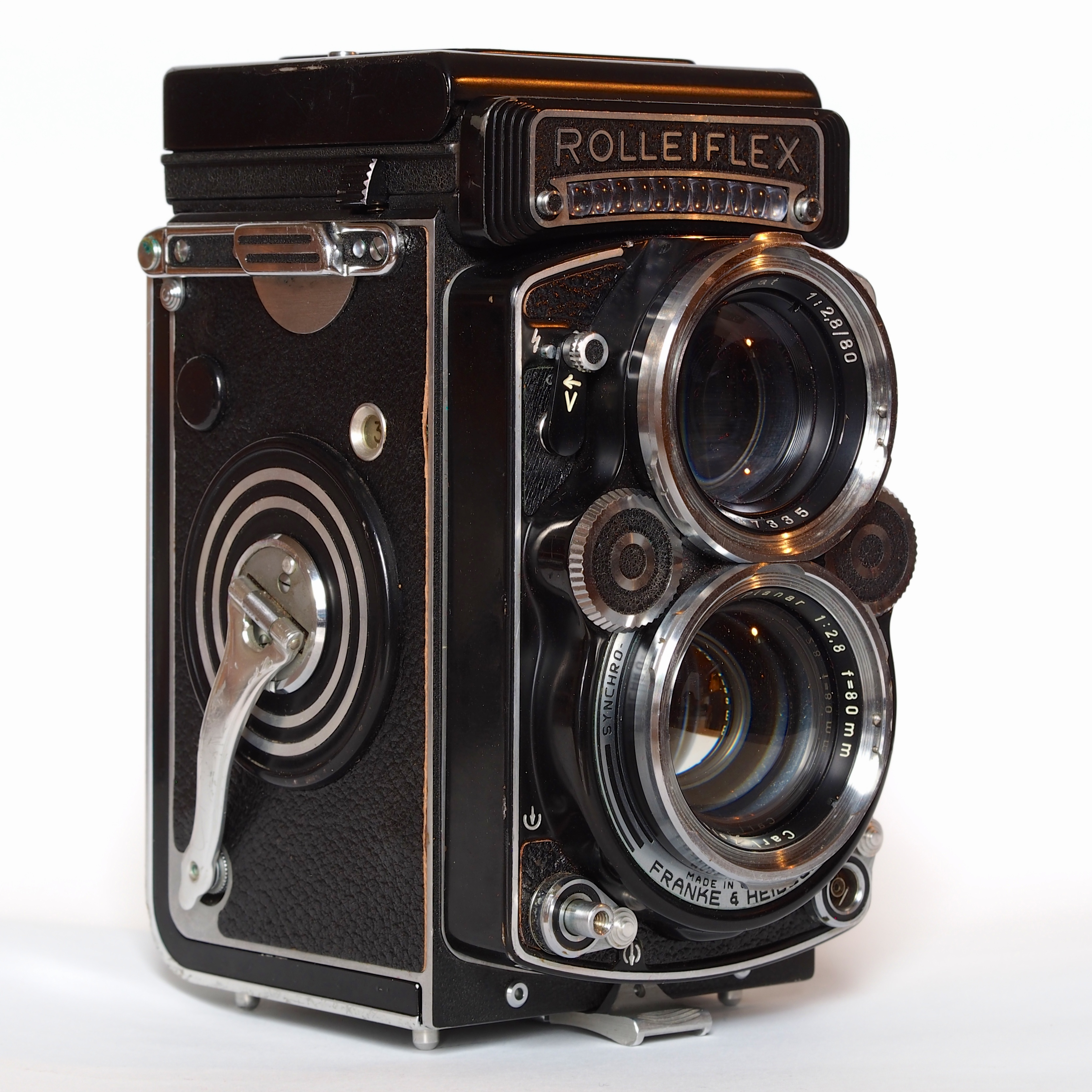
The classic Rolleiflex TLR

Higher-end TLRs may have a pop-up magnifying glass to assist the user in focusing the camera. In addition, many have a "sports finder" consisting of a square hole punched in the back of the pop-up hood, and a knock-out in the front. Photographers can sight through these instead of using the matte screen. This is especially useful in tracking moving subjects such as animals or race cars, since the image on the matte screen is reversed left-to-right. It is nearly impossible to accurately judge composition with such an arrangement, however.

Mamiya's C-Series, introduced in the 1960s, the C-3, C-2, C-33, C-22 and the Mamiya C330 and Mamiya C220 along with their predecessor the Mamiyaflex, are the main conventional TLR cameras to feature truly interchangeable lenses. "Bayonet-mount" TLRs, notably Rolleis & Yashicas, had both wide-angle and tele supplementary front add-ons, with Rollei's Zeiss Mutars being expensive but fairly sharp. Rollei also made separate TLRs having fixed wide-angle or tele lenses: the Tele Rollei and the Rollei Wide, in relatively limited quantities; higher sharpness, more convenient (faster than changing lenses) if one could carry multiple cameras around one's neck, but much more costly than using 1 camera with supplements. The Mamiya TLRs also employ bellows focusing, making extreme closeups possible.

Many TLRs used front and back cut-outs in the hinged top hood to provide a quick-action finder for sports and action photography. Late model Rollei Rolleiflex TLRs introduced the widely copied additional feature of a second-mirror "sports finder". When the hinged front hood knock-out is moved to the sports finder position a secondary mirror swings down over the view screen to reflect the image to a secondary magnifier on the back of the hood, just below the direct view cutout. This permits precise focusing while using the sports finder feature. The magnified central image is reversed both top-to-bottom and left-to-right. This feature made Rolleis the leading choice for press photographers during the 1940s to 1960s.

== Advantages ==
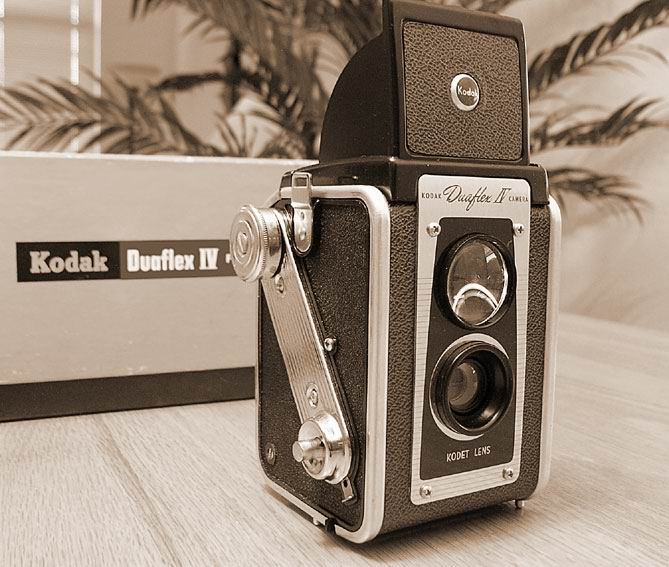
1957 Kodak Duaflex IV, an inexpensive fixed-focus TLR

A primary advantage of the TLR is in its mechanical simplicity as compared to the more common single-lens reflex cameras (SLR) cameras. The SLR must employ some method of blocking light from reaching the film during focusing, either with a focal plane shutter (most common) or with the reflex mirror itself. Both methods are mechanically complicated and add significant bulk and weight, especially in medium-format cameras. Because of their mechanical simplicity, TLR cameras are considerably cheaper than SLR cameras of similar optical quality, as well as inherently less prone to mechanical failure.

TLRs are practically different from SLR in several respects. First, unlike virtually all film SLRs, TLRs provide a continuous image on the finder screen. The view does not black out during exposure. Since a mirror does not need to be moved out of the way, the picture can be taken much closer to the time the shutter is actuated by the photographer, reducing so-called shutter lag. This trait, and the continuous viewing, made TLRs the preferred camera style for dance photography. The separate viewing lens is also very advantageous for long-exposure photographs. During exposure, an SLR's mirror must be retracted, blacking out the image in the viewfinder. A TLR's mirror is fixed and the taking lens remains open throughout the exposure, letting the photographer examine the image while the exposure is in progress. This can ease the creation of special lighting or transparency effects. Models with leaf shutters within the lens, rather than focal-plane shutters installed inside the camera body, can synchronize with flash at higher speeds than can SLRs. Flashes on SLRs usually cannot synchronize accurately when the shutter speed is faster than 1/60th of a second and occasionally 1/125th. Some higher quality DSLRs can synchronize at up to 1/500th of a second. Leaf shutters allow for flash synchronization at all shutter speeds. SLR shutter mechanisms are comparatively noisy. Most TLRs use a leaf shutter in the lens. The only mechanical noise during exposure is from the shutter leaves opening and closing.

TLRs are also ideal for candid camera shots where an eye-level camera would be conspicuous. A TLR can be hung on a neck strap and the shutter fired by cable release. Owing to the availability of medium-format cameras and the ease of image composition, the TLR was for many years also preferred by many portrait studios for static poses.

Extreme dark photographic filters like the opaque Wratten 87 can be used without problems, as they cover and thus darken only the taking lens. The image in the viewfinder stays bright.

== Disadvantages ==
Few TLR cameras offered interchangeable lenses and none were made with a zoom lens. In systems with interchangeable lenses, such as the Mamiya, the fixed distance between the lenses sets a hard limit on their size, which precludes the possibility of large aperture long-focus lenses. The lenses are also more expensive because the shutter mechanism is integrated with the lens, not the camera body, so each lens pair must include a shutter. Because the photographer views through one lens but takes the photograph through another, parallax error makes the photograph different from the view on the screen. This difference is negligible when the subject is far away, but is critical for nearby subjects. Parallax compensation may be performed by the photographer in adjustment of the sight line while compensating for the framing change, or for highly repeatable accuracy in tabletop photography (in which the subject might be within a foot (30 cm) of the camera), devices are available that move the camera upwards so that the taking lens goes to the exact position that the viewing lens occupied. (Mamiya's very accurate version was called the Para-mender and mounted on a tripod.) Some TLRs like the Rolleiflex (a notable early example is the Voigtländer Superb of 1933) also came with – more or less complex – devices to adjust parallax with focusing.

It is generally not possible to preview depth of field, as one can with most SLRs, since the TLR's viewing lens usually has no diaphragm. Exceptions to this are the Rolleiflex, the Mamiya 105 D and 105 DS lenses, which have a depth-of-field preview.

As the viewfinder of a TLR camera requires the photographer to look down toward the camera, it is inconvenient to frame a photo with a subject that requires the camera to be positioned above the photographer's chest unless a tripod is used. In these cases, the camera may be positioned with the lenses oriented horizontally. Due to the TLR's square format, the composition need not be altered. The image in the waist-level finder is reversed "left to right", which can make framing a photograph difficult, especially for an inexperienced user or with a moving subject. With high-quality TLRs like the Rolleiflex and the Mamiya C220/C330, the waist-level finder can be replaced by an eye-level finder, using a roof pentaprism or pentamirror to correct the image while making it viewable through an eyepiece at the rear of the camera.

The design of the leaf shutter limits almost all TLRs to a maximum shutter speed between 1/100 and 1/500 of a second.

Certain photographic filters are inconvenient without line of sight through the taking lens – notably, graduated neutral density filters are hard to use with a TLR, as there is no easy way to position the filter accurately.

== Film formats ==
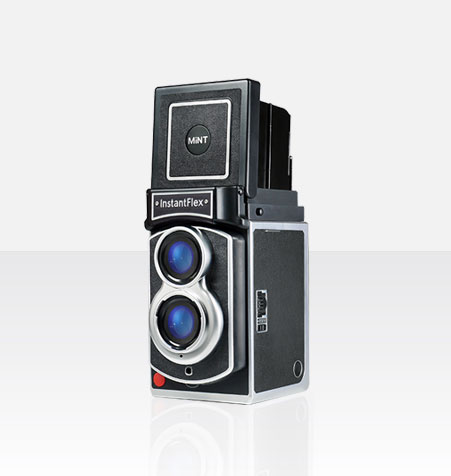
Instantflex TL70

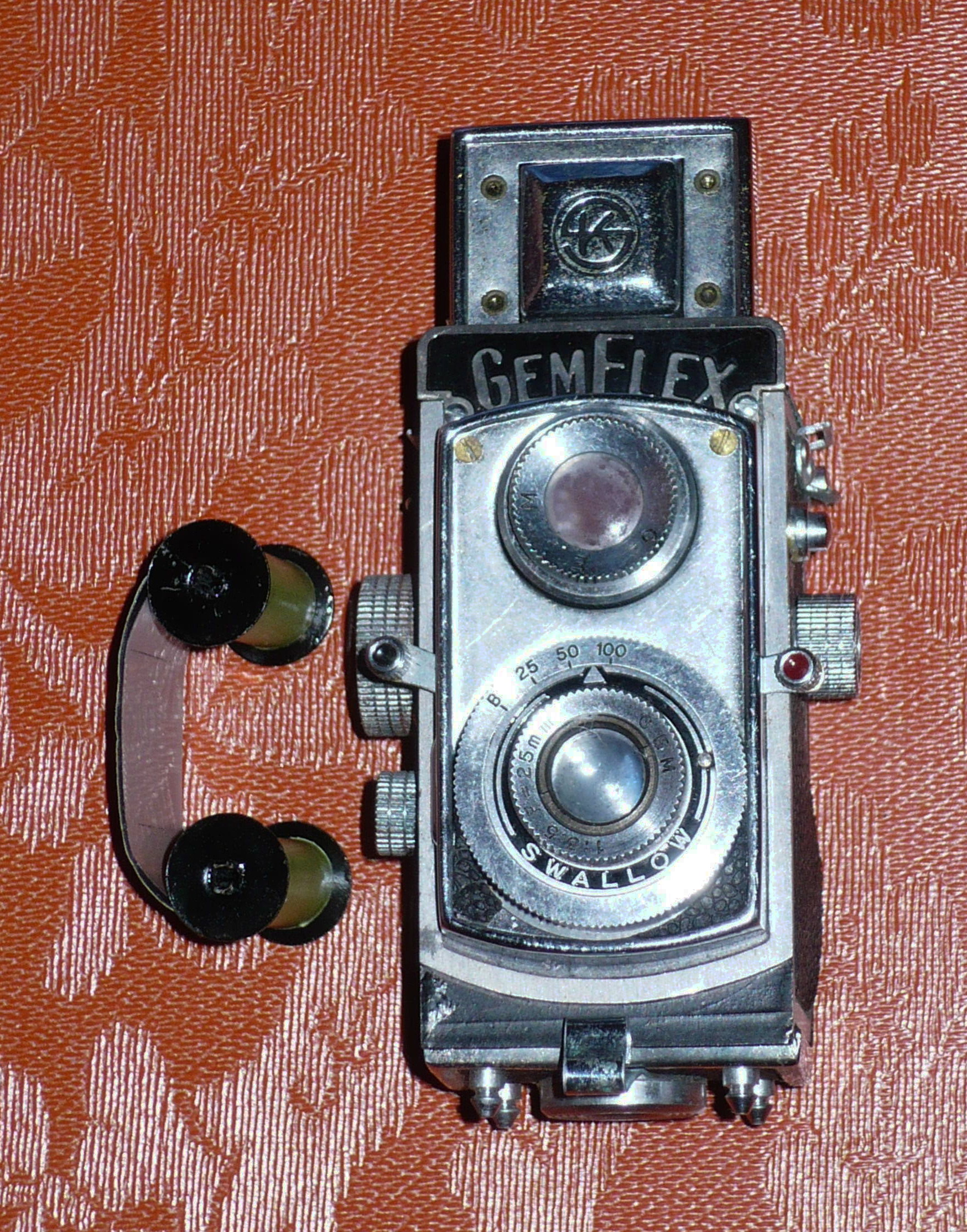
Gemflex twin lens reflex camera

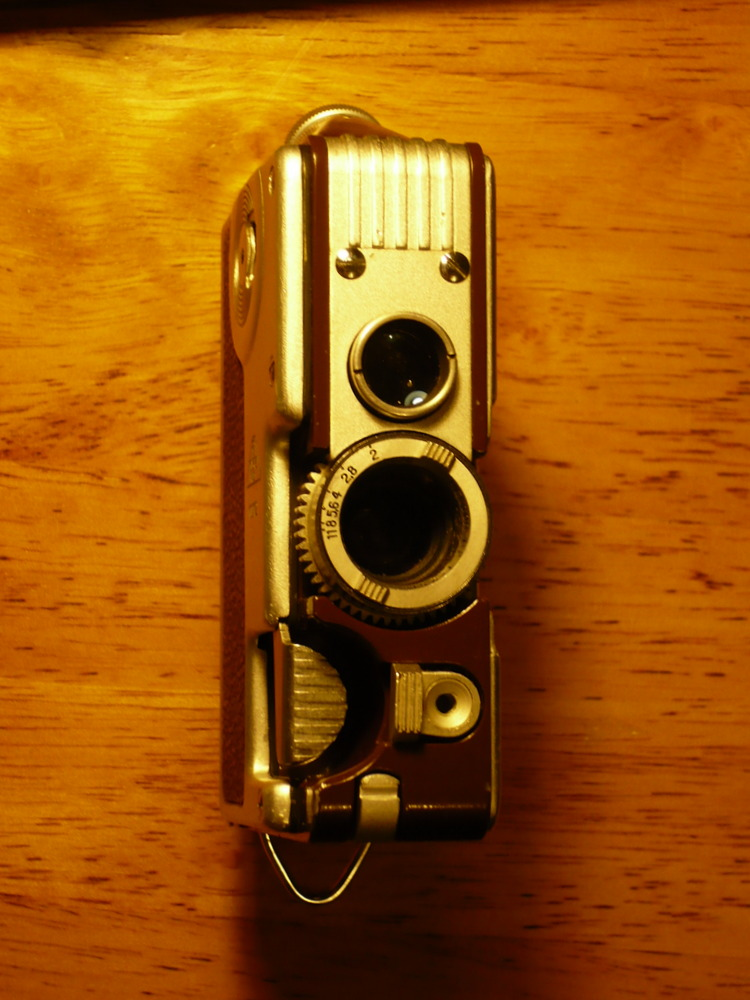
Goerz Minicord III twin lens reflex 16 mm camera

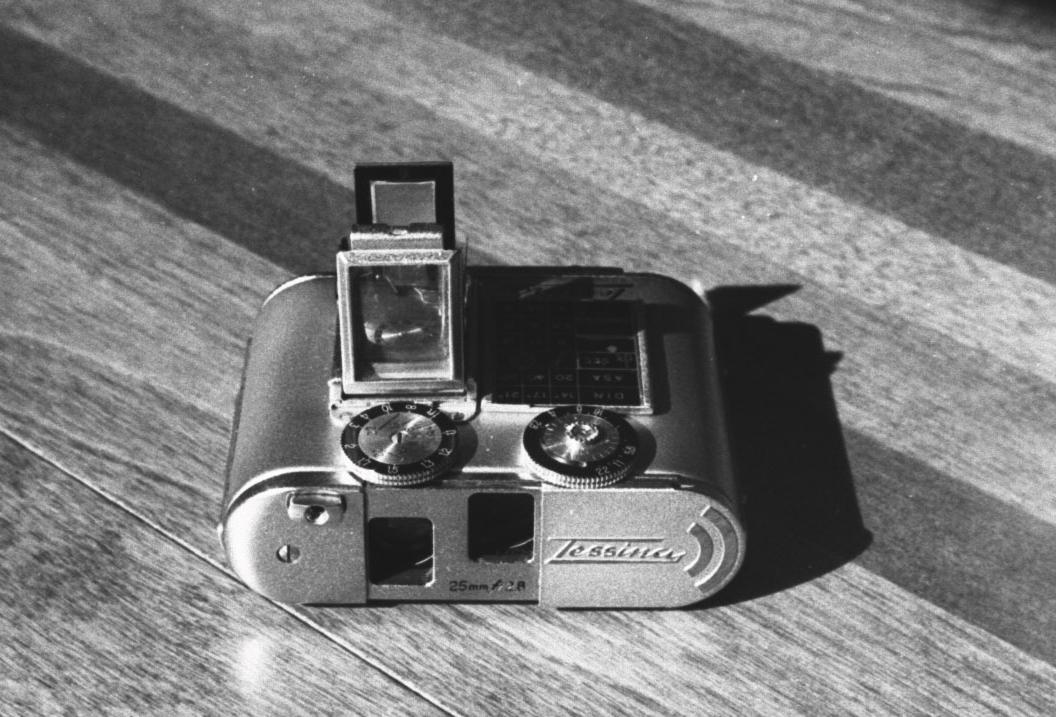
Tessina TLR

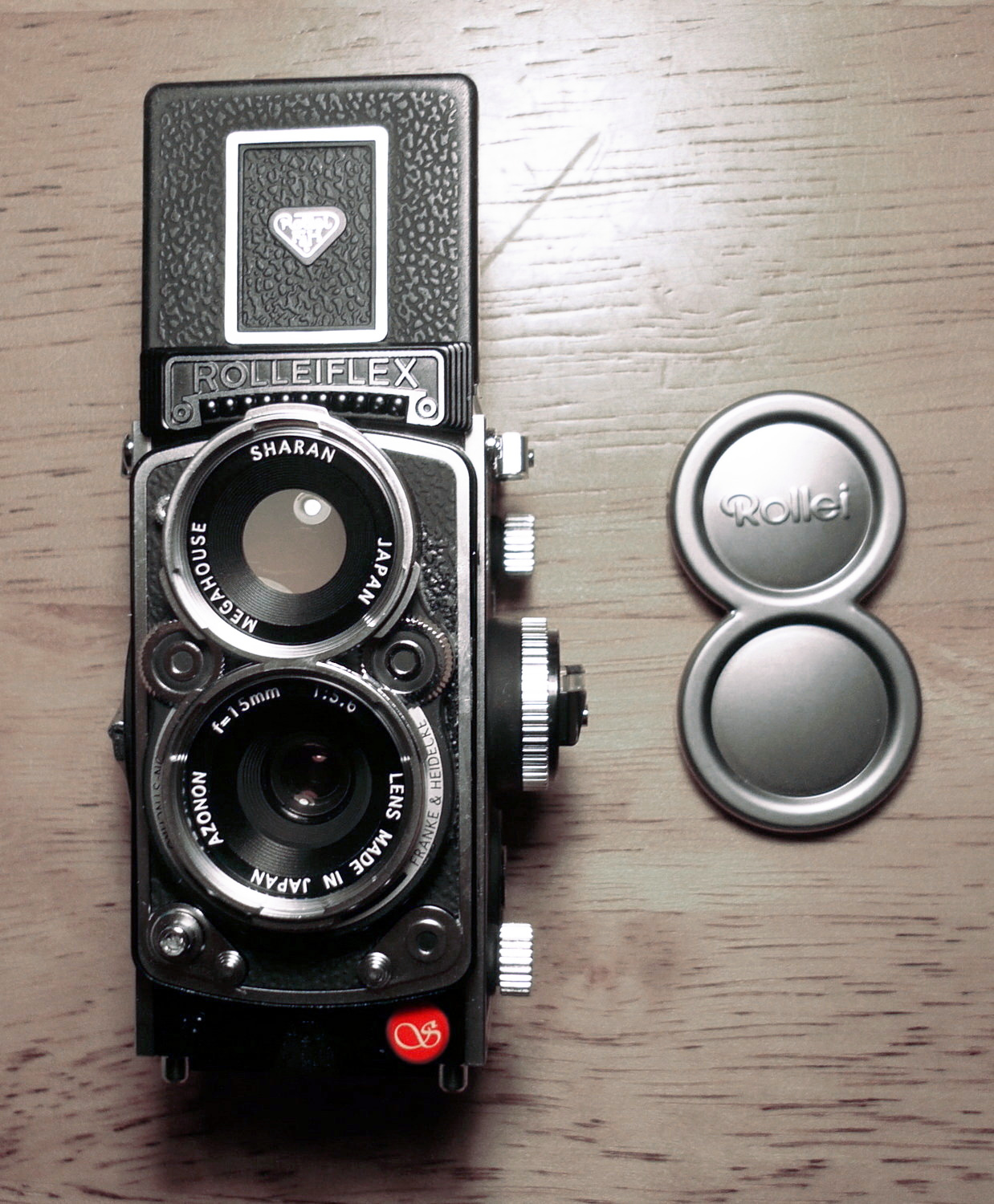
Sharan Rolleiflex 2.8F TLR Minox film camera

=== 6×6 format ===
The typical TLR is medium format, using 120 roll film with square 6 cm × 6 cm images. Presently, the Chinese Seagull Camera is still in production along with Lomography's Lubitel, but in the past, many manufacturers made them. DHW-Fototechnik GmbH continues to make the Rolleiflex TLR as well. The Ciro-flex, produced by Ciro Cameras Inc., rose dramatically in popularity due in large part to the inability to obtain the German Rollei TLRs during World War II. The Ciro-flex was widely accessible, inexpensive, and produced high quality images. Models with the Mamiya, Minolta and Yashica brands are common on the used-camera market, and many other companies made TLRs that are now classics. The Mamiya C series TLRs had interchangeable lenses, allowing focal lengths from 55 mm (wide angle) to 250 mm (telephoto) to be used. The bellows focusing of these models also allowed extreme closeups to be taken, something difficult or impossible with most TLRs. The simple, sturdy construction of many TLRs means they have tended to endure the years well. Many low-end cameras used cheap shutters however, and the slow speeds on these often stick or are inaccurate.

=== 127 format ===
There were smaller TLR models, using 127 roll film with square 4 cm × 4 cm images, most famous the "Baby" Rolleiflex and the Yashica 44. The TLR design was also popular in the 1950s for inexpensive fixed focus cameras such as the Kodak Duaflex and Argus 75.

=== 35 mm format ===
Though most used medium format film, a few 35 mm TLRs were made, the very expensive Contaflex TLR being the most elaborate, with interchangeable lenses and removable backs. The LOMO Lubitel 166+, a natively medium format camera, comes with an adapter for 35 mm film. As do most Rolleiflex models with their respective Rolleikin 35mm adapter. Furthermore the Yashica 635 was made specifically for use with 120 and 135 film and was shipped with the appropriate adapters.

=== Instant film format ===
The only twin lens reflex camera that uses instant film is Instantflex TL70 manufactured by MiNT Camera which is compatible with Fuji instax mini film (film size 54 mm × 86 mm, picture size 46 mm × 62 mm) . It is the world's first instant twin lens reflex camera.

=== Subminiature format ===
Gemflex is a subminiature twin lens reflex camera made by Showa Optica Works (昭和光学精機) in occupied Japan in the 50s. Gemflex resembles the well known Rolleiflex 6×6 twin lens reflex, but much smaller in size. The body of Gemflex is die cast from shatter proof metal.

The smallest photography TLR camera using 35 mm film is the Swiss-made Tessina, using perforated 35 mm film reloaded into special Tessina cassette, forming images of 14 mm × 21 mm.

Goerz Minicord twin lens reflex made 10 mm × 10 mm format on double perforated 16 mm film in metal cassette. 6 Element Goerz Helgor F2 lens, metal focal plane shutter B, 10, 25, 50, 100, and 400. Viewing lens uses pentaprism reflex optics for the viewing lens. Picture format 10 mm × 10 mm on double perforated 16 mm film.

Minox rebadged Sharan Rolleflex 2.8F classic retro TLR film camera, 1/3 scale 6x6 Rolleiflex TLR, using Minox cassette image size 8 mm × 11 mm, 15 mm F5.6 glass triplet lens, mechanical shutter 1/250 sec.

Japan made Gemflex, a twin lens reflex using 17.5 mm paper back roll film.

It has been argued that the medical gastroscopy camera, the Olympus Gastro Camera is technically the smallest TLR device.
