= Maggy Whitehouse =

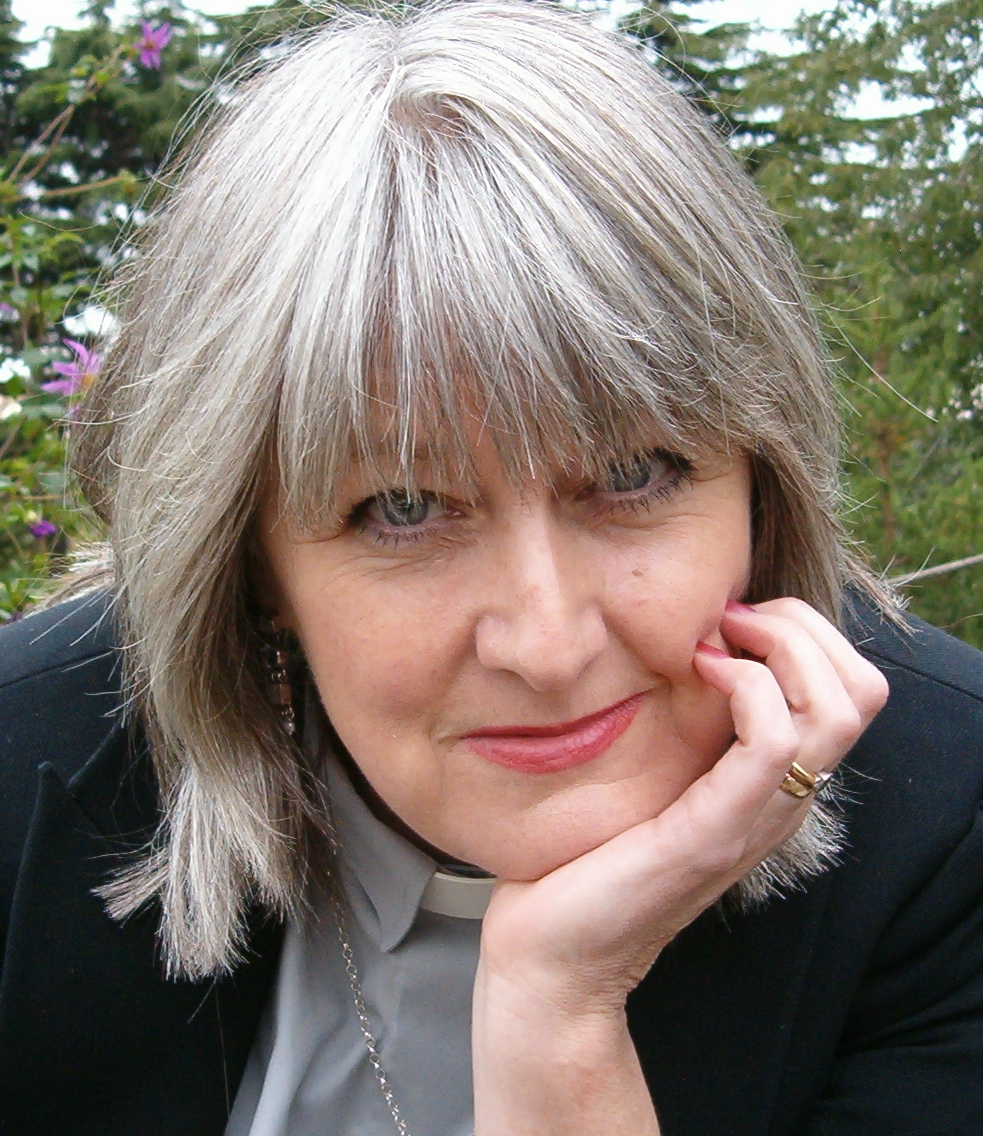
Maggy Whitehouse

Maggy Whitehouse (born April 26th 1956) is an English independent Sacramental priest, a stand-up comedian, a broadcaster and an author and specialist in Judaeo-Christian mysticism, particularly Bible interpretation for interfaith.

She is a radio presenter and former BBC journalist, a travel documentary presenter and producer for Carlton TV, has acted as host moderator for BBC's Religion and Ethics message boards and was producer of BBC's now defunct holistic health and spirituality website.

Whitehouse is the author of books on Judaism, Christianity and faith, including four on the Judaic mystical system known as Kabbalah. She was co-founder and Consultant Editor of the holistic magazine Tree of Life.

Whitehouse is also literary agent for the British novelist Norah Lofts.

== Comedy ==
Maggy Whitehouse trained as a stand-up comedian in 2012 at the age of 56. She is unique for her no-holds-barred interpretation of religion and priesthood and is now a professional comic gigging throughout the UK. In 2014, she took her one-hour show The Maggy Whitehouse Experience to the Edinburgh Fringe Festival. She was a finalist in the 2015 UK Funny Women Awards. In 2018, she joined forces with two Anglican clergy, Rev. Ravi Holy of the Wye Benefice and Rev. Kate Bruce, RAF Chaplain to form White Collar Comedy. The three performed at Edinburgh Fringe from 1 to 10 August 2019 at Sofi's Southside.

== Bible metaphysics and authorship ==
Maggy Whitehouse is an author and teacher of the Judaic mystical system of Kabbalah with particular reference to the mystical interpretation of the teachings of Jesus and the place and role of women in the Bible era.

Her latest book is Some Velvet Morning, the third of the Blue Panda trilogy about a vicar who works between worlds reuniting lost souls.

Whitehouse's 2007 book The Marriage of Jesus explored the social and economic times in which Jesus lived. Her theory is that Jesus would have married, like any other young man of his times, at the age of approximately 14. Working from historical knowledge of the times (and referring to Suzanne Dixon's book The Roman Mother) Whitehouse begins from the premise that the average lifespan of a woman in Jesus' time was 27 years. As Jesus is said to have begun his ministry at approximately 30 years old, she finds it likely that he was a widower by that time.

In the 1990s, Whitehouse wrote a fictional trilogy about a female cousin of Jesus, including The Book of Deborah.

Whitehouse's novel The Miracle Man, an updated version of the story of Christ, was published in November 2010.

== Background and ministry ==
From 1993 to 2009, Whitehouse studied the Toledano Tradition of Kabbalah with Z'ev ben Shimon Halevi (Warren Kenton). She has acknowledged Kenton as the inspiration for her books on Kabbalah, which she calls "primers" for Kenton's own work.

Whitehouse studied New Testament Greek at Birmingham University for a year with Mark Goodacre and David Parker. She became an interfaith funeral minister in 2003. In 2007 she was ordained into the Apostolic Church of the Risen Christ, an Independent Catholic church, part of the Ascension Alliance.

== Broadcasting ==
Whitehouse presented the Sunday morning breakfast show on BBC Radio Devon between August 2016 and October 2017. She worked as breakfast presenter for BBC Radio WM and Hereward Radio in the 1980s and as assistant producer on BBC Pebble Mill At One. In 1989, Whitehouse presented and co-produced the documentary Manchuria Express, about steam engines in China as part of Channel 4's 'Voyager' series. Her father Patrick Whitehouse was an advisor on the series.

== Works ==
Non-Fiction

- China By Rail. Century (1987). ISBN 978-0-091737-09-2
- Living Kabbalah. Hamlyn (2004). ISBN 978-0-600609-70-4
- Prosperity Teachings Of The Bible Made Easy. Axis Mundi (2012). ISBN 978-1-780991-07-8
- The Marriage of Jesus. O Books (2007). ISBN 978-1-84694-008-8
- The Secret History of Opus Dei. Lorenz Books (2007). ISBN 978-0-7548-1699-7
- Total Kabbalah: Bring Balance and Happiness into Your Life. Chronicle Books (2007). ISBN 978-0-8118-6137-3
- The Complete Illustrated History of Kabbalah. Lorenz Books (2008). ISBN 978-0-7548-1765-9
- From Credit Crunch to Pure Prosperity. O Books (2009). ISBN 978-1-84694-328-7
- The Spiritual Laws of Prosperity. Tree of Life Publishing (2009). ISBN 978-1-905806-37-9
- A Woman's Worth, the Divine Feminine in the Hebrew Bible. Axis Mundi (2013). ISBN 978-1780998343
- Kabbalah & Healing. O Books (2020). ISBN 978-1789040692
- Kabbalah Made Easy. O Books (2011) ISBN 978-1-846945-44-1

Fiction

- The Book Of Deborah (Chronicles of Deborah). Little, Brown (1997): Tree of Life Publishing (2007). ISBN 978-1-905806-00-3
- Into the Kingdom (Chronicles of Deborah). Tree of Life Publishing (2003). ISBN 978-1-905806-17-1
- Leaves Of The Tree (Chronicles of Deborah). Tree of Life Publishing (2007). ISBN 978-1-905806-10-2
- The Miracle Man. O Books (Nov 2010). ISBN 978-1-84694-416-1
- For the Love of Dog. Tree of Life Publishing (2016). ISBN 978-1905806485
- Tales of the Blue Panda Tree of Life Publishing (2020). ISBN 978-1905806942
- Hounds of Heaven. Tree of Life Publishing (2022). ISBN 978-1915816023
- Some Velvet Morning. Tree of Life Publishing (2024). ISBN 978-1915816146
