= Mamiya C330 =

1970s twin-lens reflex camera

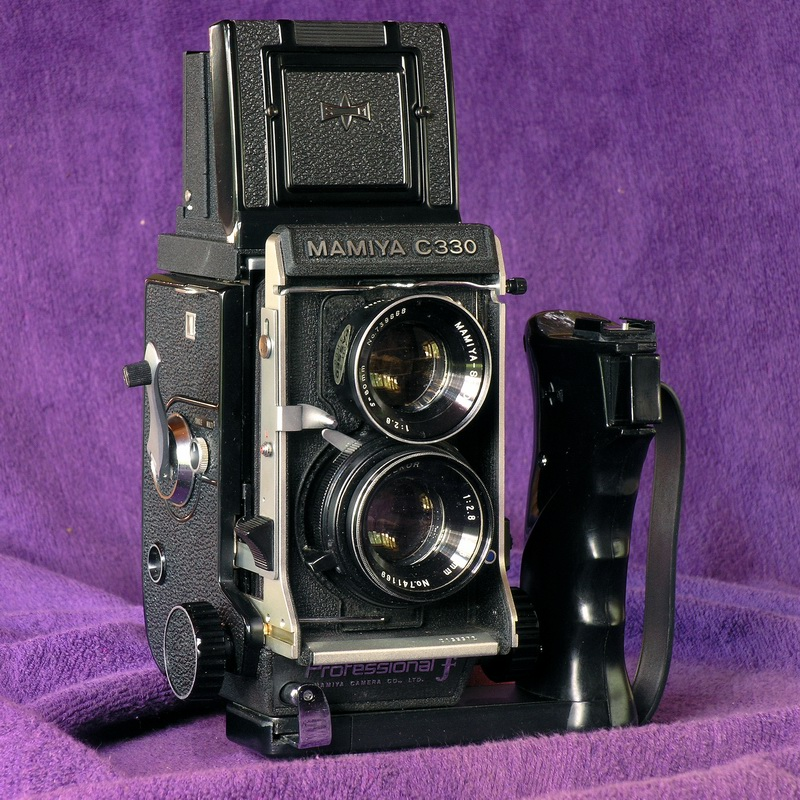
C330f with one of the gripholders

The Mamiya C330 Professional is a traditional film twin-lens reflex camera introduced in the 1970s for the professional and advanced amateur photography markets. This model was 340 grams lighter than the previous model C33, which weighed 2040 grams (with 80 mm lens). The later C330f is an improvement on the C330 and was succeeded by the C330S with further improvements.

- Uses 120 and 220 rollfilms
- With the rack and pinion bellows type focusing system, close-up photography is possible without attachments.
- Has a self-cocking one action 360° winding crank with a double exposure prevention device. Double exposure is also possible. The straight filmroll path has no right-angle turn and guarantees an absolutely flat film.
- The backplate is changeable for single-exposure photography
- Dimensions: 122 (w) × 168 (h) × 114 (d)
- Weight: 1.7 kg (with standard lens)

The Mamiya C-series cameras are one of the very few twin-lens reflex cameras with interchangeable lenses, along with the Koni-Omegaflex and Zeiss Contaflex.

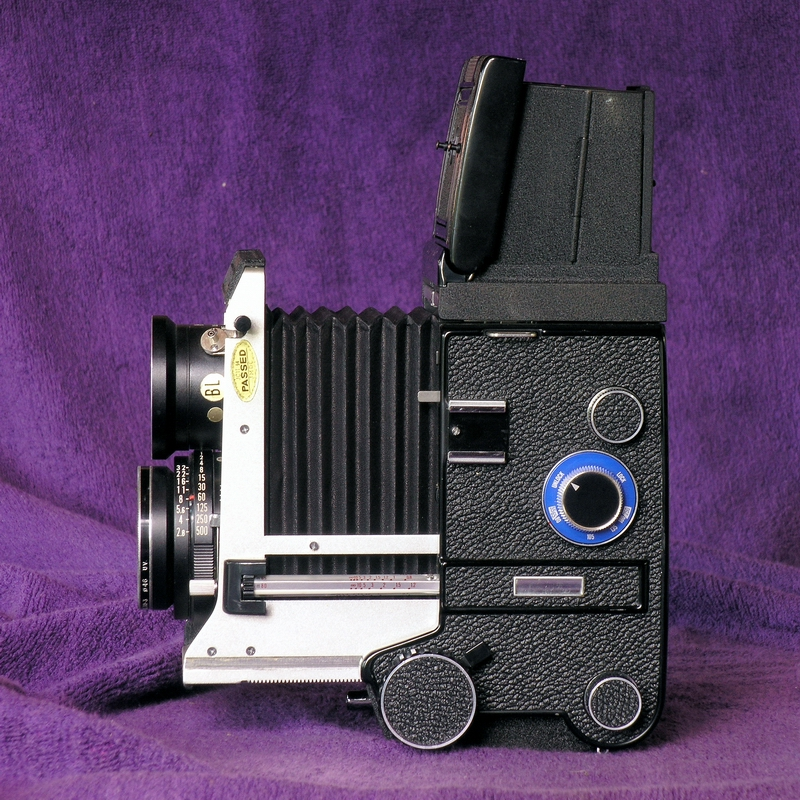
Extended bellows for close-ups

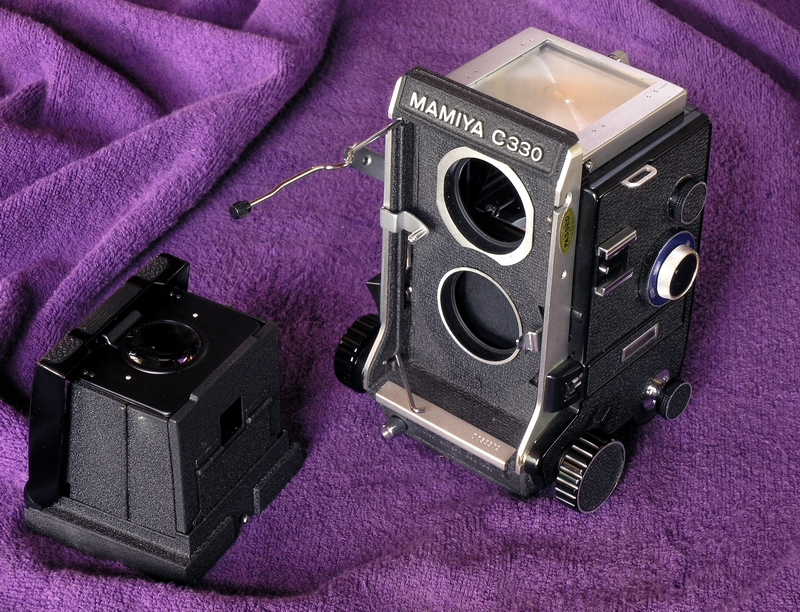
Focusing hood and changeable screen

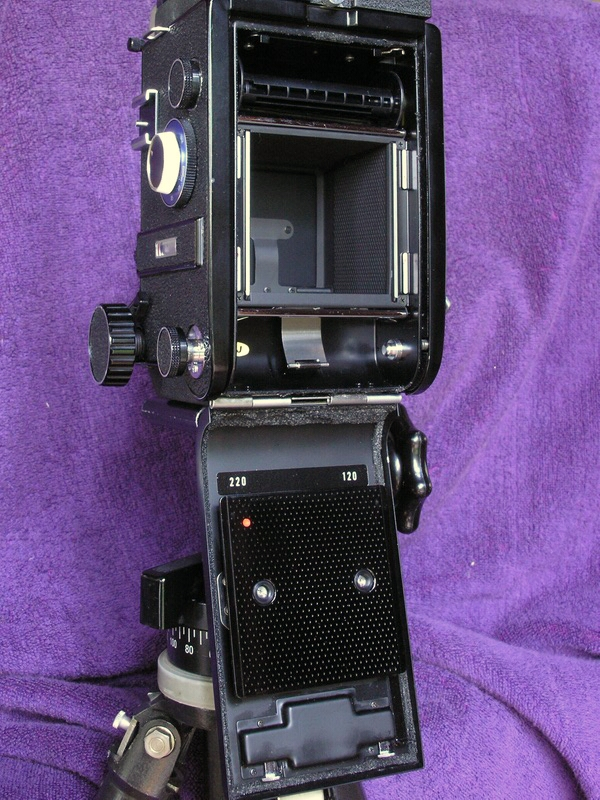
Film compartment with adjustable filmplate and changeable backplate

== Lenses ==
Mamiya TLR lenses

There are seven Mamiya Sekor lenses:

2 wide-angle lenses
55 mm f/4.5 and 65 mm f/3.5
4 normal lenses
80 mm f/3.7, two versions of 80 mm f/2.8 and 105 mm f/3.5
3 telephoto lenses
135 mm f/4.5, 180 mm f/4.5, and 250 mm f/6.3

Every lens has its own Seikosha (chrome) or Seiko (black) leaf shutter system with a shutter speed of B, 1' -1/500 sec, X or M flash synchronisation and bulb mode. The C330 camera has two shutter release buttons, an automatic conversion film counter 120/220, an indicator of the film in use, a removable back cover, a hexagonal distance scale rod for the different lenses, automatic parallax compensation, an automatic exposure factor indicator and interchangeable focusing screens.

== Accessories ==
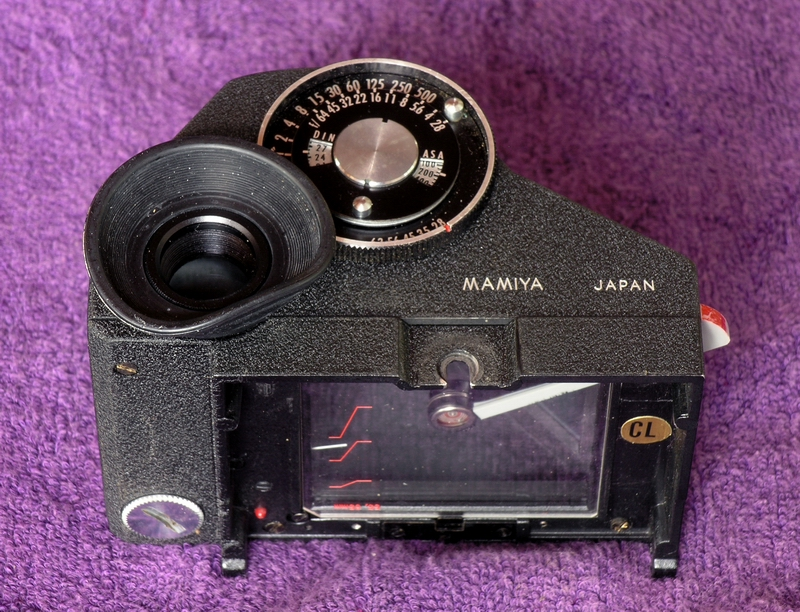
Porrofinder with CdS cell

- 7 interchangeable screens for focusing (matte, split image 4°, split image 6°, microprism, microprism + split image 45°, cross-hair and checkerboard pattern.
- 3 types of finders: a prismfinder, a porrofinder and a CdS-porrofinder (with a built-in CdS exposure meter).
- Three types of magnifying hoods: normal focusing hood, CdS magnifying hood and a magnifying hood 3.5× or 6×.
- Two paramenders for parallax correction
- gripholders and pistol grip
- backplates for sheet film

== See also ==
- Mamiya C220
- Mamiyaflex
