= Rolleiflex =

Line of twin-lens and single-lens reflex cameras by Rollei

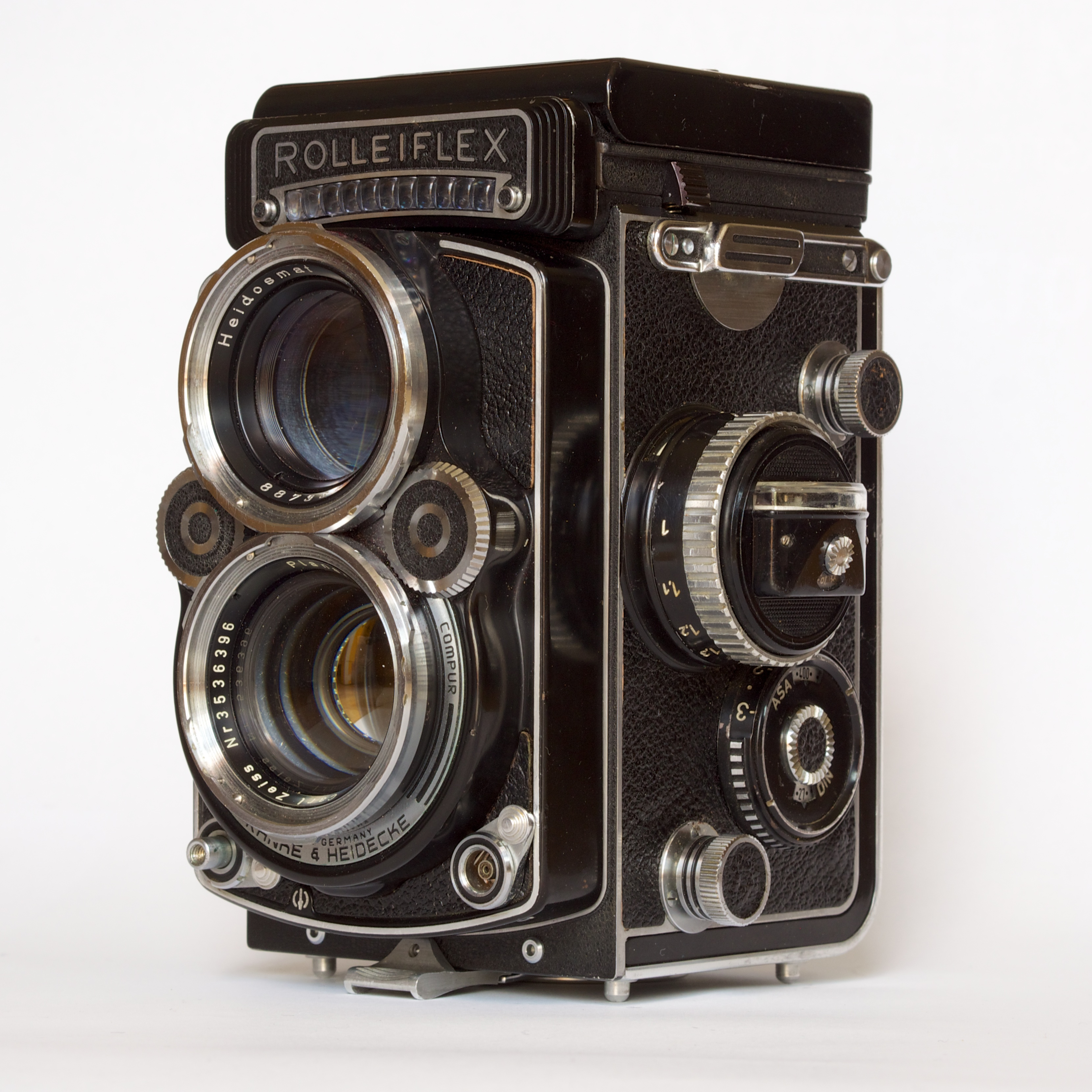
A Rolleiflex 2.8 F

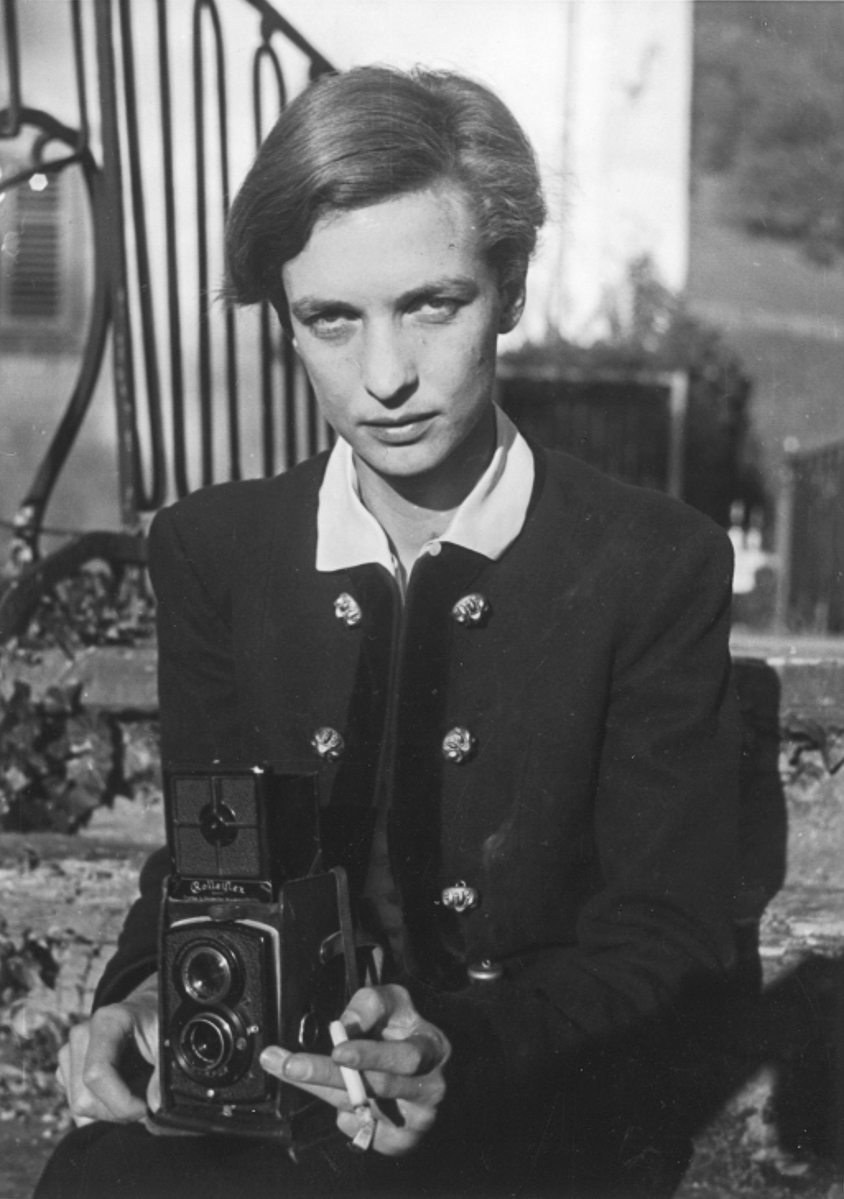
Swiss writer and photographer Annemarie Schwarzenbach holding the Rolleiflex Standard 621 (1938).

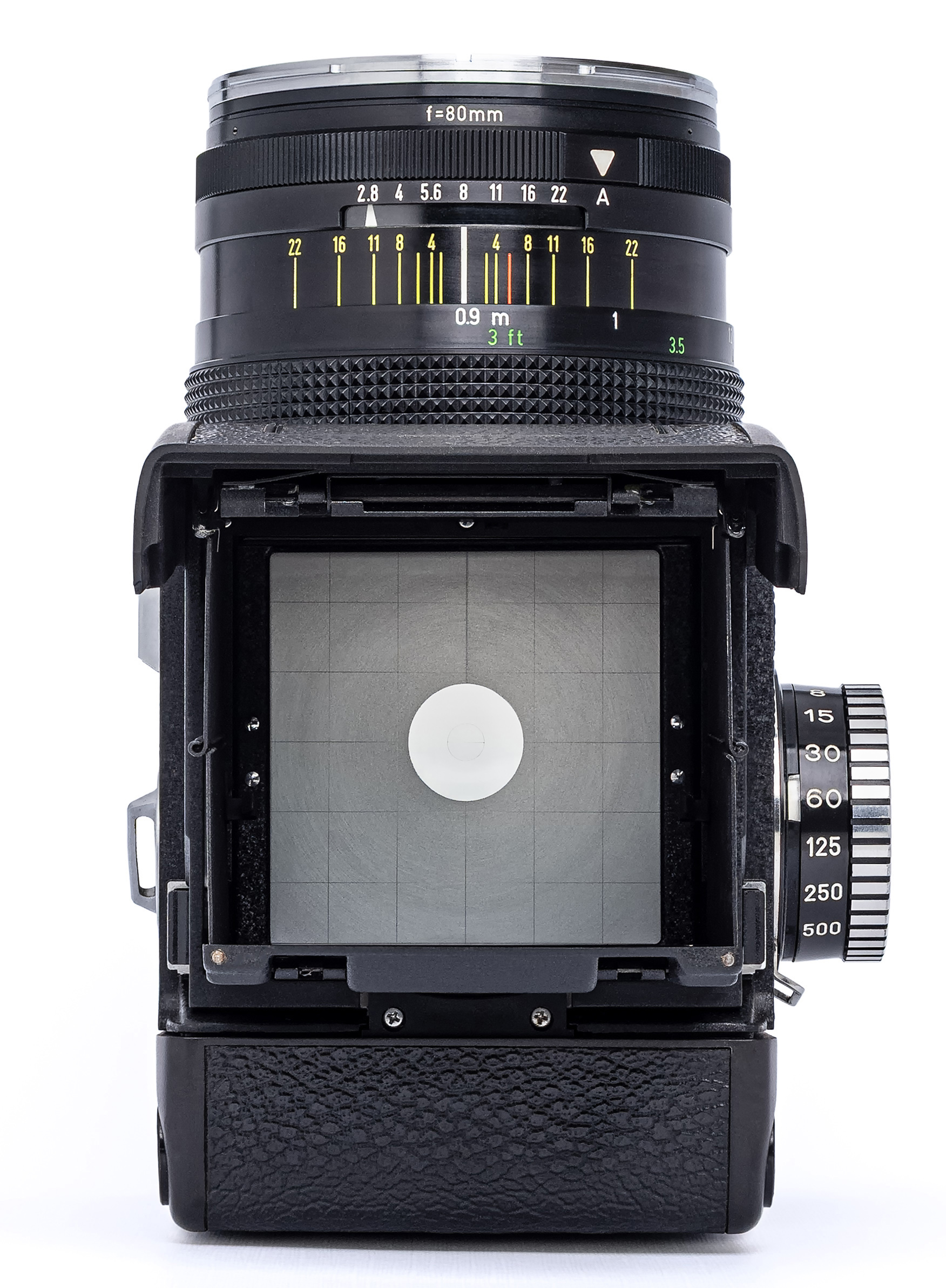
The camera is held at the waist, with the viewfinder mounted on top (here, a Rolleiflex SLX).

Rolleiflex is a long-running and diverse line of cameras originally made by the German company Franke & Heidecke, and later Rollei-Werke.

== History ==
The "Rolleiflex" name is most commonly used to refer to Rollei's premier line of medium format twin lens reflex (TLR) cameras. (A companion line intended for amateur photographers, Rolleicord, existed for several decades.) A variety of TLRs and SLRs in medium format, zone focus and SLR 35 mm, as well as digital formats have also been produced under the Rolleiflex label. The 120 roll film Rolleiflex series is marketed primarily to professional photographers. Rolleiflex cameras have used film formats 117 (Original Rolleiflex), 120 (Standard, Automat, Letter Models, Rollei-Magic, and T model), and 127 (Baby Rolleiflex).

The Rolleiflex TLR film cameras were known for their exceptional quality, compact size, modest weight, superior optics, durability, simplicity, reliable mechanics and bright viewfinders. The high-quality 7.5 cm focal length lenses, manufactured by Zeiss and Schneider, allowed for a smaller, lighter, more compact camera than their imitators. The Zeiss Planar f2.8 and Schneider Xenotar lenses, both 80mm focal length and fast in comparison, were quality optics. Unique to the Rolleiflex Automat and letter model cameras, the mechanical wind mechanism was robust, making film loading semi-automatic and quick. This mechanism started the exposure counter automatically, auto-spaced the 12 or (on the later model F cameras) 24 exposures, and tensioned the shutter; all with less than one full turn of the film advance crank. This made the Rolleiflex Automat/Letter model cameras very popular after for shooting fast-paced action, such as street photography.

A range of accessories made this camera a system: panorama head, sun shade, parallax-corrected close-ups lenses, color correction, contrast enhancing, and special effect filters, all mounted with a quick release bayonet, as well as a quick-change tripod attachment. Some professional, amateur, and fine-art photographers still shoot Rolleiflex TLR film cameras with color transparency, color negative, or black-and-white film. The later f2.8 and f3.5 letter models (Planar or Xenotar lens) are highly sought after in the used market, and command the greatest price. Historically there were five focal length cameras available including 5.5 cm Rollei-Wide, 6.0 cm Baby Rollei, 7.5 cm (f:3.5), 8.0 cm (f2.8), and 13.5 cm (f:4 Zeiss Sonnar) Tele-Rolleiflex. Although all Rolleiflex cameras can be fine user cameras, there is also an active market for many Rolleiflex models as collectables, and this adds (greatly in some models) to the end price paid, particularly in Japan.

Rolleiflex medium format cameras continued to be produced by DHW Fototechnik up to 2014—a company founded by former Franke & Heidecke employees. DHW Fototechnik announced two new Rolleiflex cameras and a new electronic shutter for photokina 2012. The company filed for insolvency in 2014 and was dissolved in April 2015, ending any further production. The factory production equipment and remaining stocks of parts were auctioned off in late April 2015.

A smaller company was created again with former DHW Fototechnik employees, under the name DW Photo at the same location. DW Photo focuses on producing the Rolleiflex Hy6 mod2 medium format SLR camera (digital & film), servicing existing cameras, including providing firmware and hardware upgrades.

== Notable models ==
=== TLR models ===
Classic Rolleiflex TLR timeline
System	1930s										1940s										1950s										1960s										1970s										1980s									
System	0	1	2	3	4	5	6	7	8	9	0	1	2	3	4	5	6	7	8	9	0	1	2	3	4	5	6	7	8	9	0	1	2	3	4	5	6	7	8	9	0	1	2	3	4	5	6	7	8	9	0	1	2	3	4	5	6	7	8	9
Early	Orig (K1)		Std (K2)							Std (K4)																																																		
3.5										Automat																		3.5C (3.5E)			3.5E2/E3																													
3.5																													3.5F																															
3.5																													T																															
2.8																				2.8A			2.8B			2.8D					2.8F																													
2.8																							2.8C				2.8E																																	
Tele																														Tele																														
Wide																																Wide																												

Early and Automat Rolleiflex TLR cameras
Camera		Dates		Taking lens (FL=75 mm)		Viewing lens (FL=75 mm)		Shutter		Notes
Name	Model	Intro.	Disc.	Name	Ap.	Name	Ap.	Name	Speeds	Notes
Original (K1)	611	Jan 1929	Jul 1929	Zeiss Tessar	f/4.5	Heidoscop Anastigmat	f/3.1	Compur	1-1/300 + B, T	
Original (K1)	612	Apr 1929	Jul 1929	Zeiss Tessar	f/3.8	Heidoscop Anastigmat	f/3.1	Compur	1-1/300 + B, T	
Original (K1)	613	Aug 1929	Feb 1932	Zeiss Tessar	f/4.5	Heidoscop Anastigmat	f/3.1	Compur	1-1/300 + B, T	
Original (K1)	614	Aug 1929	Feb 1932	Zeiss Tessar	f/3.8	Heidoscop Anastigmat	f/3.1	Compur	1-1/300 + B, T	
(Old) Standard (K2)	620	Jan 1932	Jan 1934	Zeiss Tessar	f/4.5	Heidoscop Anastigmat	f/3.1	Compur	1-1/300 + B, T	
(Old) Standard (K2)	621	Feb 1932	Jan 1935	Zeiss Tessar	f/3.8	Heidoscop Anastigmat	f/3.1	Compur	1-1/300 + B, T	
(Old) Standard (K2)	622	Nov 1932	Jan 1938	Zeiss Tessar	f/3.5	Heidoscop Anastigmat	f/3.1	Compur Rapid	1-1/500 + B, T	
(New) Standard (K4)	640	May 1939	Jul 1941	Zeiss Tessar	f/3.5	Heidoscop Anastigmat	f/3.1	Compur Rapid	1-1/500 + B, T	
Automat	RF 111A	Aug 1937	Mar 1939	Zeiss Tessar	f/3.5	Heidoscop Anastigmat	f/2.8	Compur Rapid	1-1/500 + B, T	
Automat (K4B)	K4B	Apr 1939	Oct 1945	Zeiss Tessar	f/3.5	Heidoscop Anastigmat	f/2.8	Compur Rapid	1-1/500 + B, T	
Automat (K4B)	K4B2	Oct 1945	Sep 1949	Zeiss Jena Tessar	f/3.5	Heidoscop Anastigmat	f/2.8	Compur Rapid	1-1/500 + B, T	
Automat (K4B)	K4B2	Oct 1945	Sep 1949	Zeiss Opton (Oberkochen) Tessar	f/3.5	Heidoscop Anastigmat	f/2.8	Compur Rapid	1-1/500 + B, T	
Automat (K4B)	K4B2	Oct 1945	Sep 1949	Schneider Xenar	f/3.5	Heidoscop Anastigmat	f/2.8	Compur Rapid	1-1/500 + B, T	
Automat	K4/50	Oct 1949	May 1951	Zeiss Jena Tessar	f/3.5	Heidoscop Anastigmat	f/2.8	Compur Rapid	1-1/500 + B, T; X-sync	
Automat	K4/50	Oct 1949	May 1951	Zeiss Opton (Oberkochen) Tessar	f/3.5	Heidoscop Anastigmat	f/2.8	Compur Rapid	1-1/500 + B, T; X-sync	
Automat	K4/50	Oct 1949	May 1951	Schneider Xenar	f/3.5	Heidoscop Anastigmat	f/2.8	Compur Rapid	1-1/500 + B, T; X-sync	
Automat	K4A	Jun 1951	Mar 1954	Zeiss Jena Tessar	f/3.5	Heidoscop Anastigmat	f/2.8	Compur Rapid	1-1/500 + B, T; X-sync	
Automat	K4A	Jun 1951	Mar 1954	Zeiss Opton (Oberkochen) Tessar	f/3.5	Heidoscop Anastigmat	f/2.8	Compur Rapid	1-1/500 + B, T; X-sync	
Automat	K4A	Jun 1951	Mar 1954	Schneider Xenar	f/3.5	Heidoscop Anastigmat	f/2.8	Compur Rapid	1-1/500 + B, T; X-sync	
Automat	K4B	Apr 1954	Sep 1956	Zeiss Jena Tessar	f/3.5	Heidoscop Anastigmat	f/2.8	Compur Rapid	1-1/500 + B, T; M&X-sync	
Automat	K4B	Apr 1954	Sep 1956	Zeiss Opton (Oberkochen) Tessar	f/3.5	Heidoscop Anastigmat	f/2.8	Compur Rapid	1-1/500 + B, T; M&X-sync	
Automat	K4B	Apr 1954	Sep 1956	Schneider Xenar	f/3.5	Heidoscop Anastigmat	f/2.8	Compur Rapid	1-1/500 + B, T; M&X-sync	

==== Original Rolleiflex ====
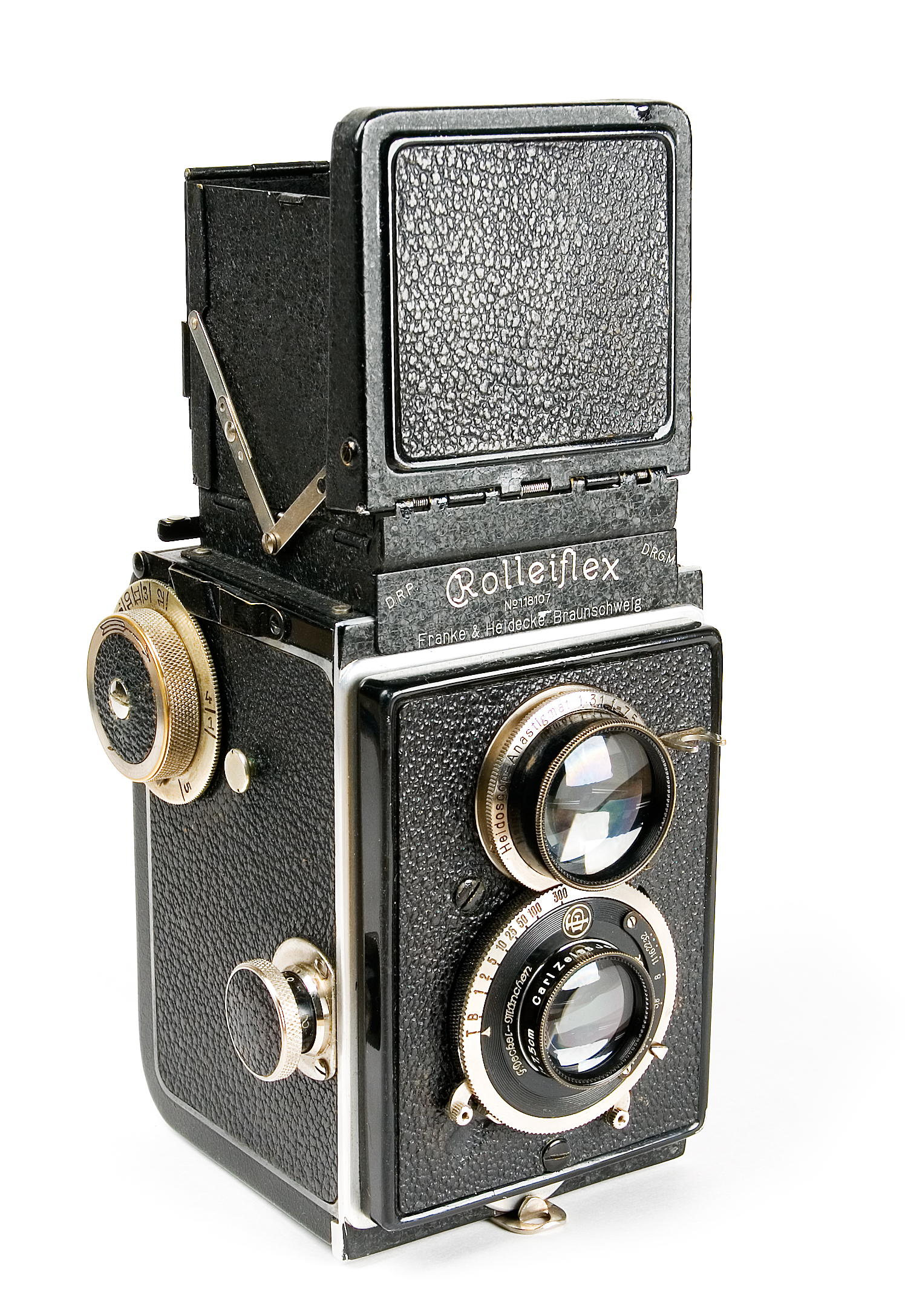
Rolleiflex Original with Carl Zeiss Jena Tessar f/3.8

This first Rolleiflex was introduced in 1929 after three years of development, and was the company's first medium format roll-film camera, which was used with unpopular 117 (B1) film. It was a Twin-Lens Reflex camera.

==== Old Standard ====
- The "Old Standard" was originally known as simply the "Standard" until the introduction of the New Standard in 1939.
- This model introduced a hinged back and a frame counter. While not automatic, like in the Rolleiflex Automat, the photographer could reset the counter with a small button after reaching the first frame
- Robert Capa used an Old Standard to document World War II.

==== Rolleiflex Automat ====
- Introduced an automatic film counter; this counter senses the thickness of the film backing to accurately begin counting frames, obviating the need for the ruby window that forced the photographer to read the frame number off the backing paper of the film.
- This model won the Grand Prix award at the Paris World's Fair in 1937.
- The first Rolleiflex to offer a Schneider Kreuznach Xenar taking lens as an option, in addition to the Carl Zeiss Tessar.

Rolleiflex 2.8 TLR cameras (A–F)
Camera		Dates		Taking lens (FL=80 mm)		Viewing lens (FL=80 mm)		Shutter		Notes
Name	Model	Intro.	Disc.	Name	Ap.	Name	Ap.	Name	Speeds	Notes
2.8A	K7A	Dec 1949	Feb 1951	Zeiss Opton (Oberkochen) Tessar	f/2.8	Heidosmat	f/2.8	Compur Rapid	1-1/400 + B; X-sync	
2.8A	K7A	Apr 1951	Aug 1951	Zeiss Opton (Oberkochen) Tessar	f/2.8	Heidosmat	f/2.8	Compur Rapid MX	1-1/500 + B; M&X-sync	
2.8B	K7B	Feb 1952	Mar 1953	Zeiss Jena Biometar	f/2.8	Heidosmat	f/2.8	Compur Rapid MX	1-1/500 + B; M&X-sync	
2.8C	K7C	Dec 1952	Jun 1955	Schneider Xenotar	f/2.8	Heidosmat	f/2.8	Compur Rapid MXV	1-1/500 + B; M&X-sync	
2.8C	K7C	Dec 1952	Jun 1955	Zeiss Planar	f/2.8	Heidosmat	f/2.8	Compur Rapid MXV	1-1/500 + B; M&X-sync	
2.8D	K7D	Aug 1955	Sep 1956	Schneider Xenotar	f/2.8	Heidosmat	f/2.8	Compur Rapid MXV	1-1/500 + B; M&X-sync	
2.8D	K7D	Aug 1955	Sep 1956	Zeiss Planar	f/2.8	Heidosmat	f/2.8	Compur Rapid MXV	1-1/500 + B; M&X-sync	
2.8E	K7E	Oct 1956	Sep 1959	Schneider Xenotar	f/2.8	Heidosmat	f/2.8	Synchro Compur MXV	1-1/500 + B; M&X-sync	
2.8E	K7E	Oct 1956	Sep 1959	Zeiss Planar	f/2.8	Heidosmat	f/2.8	Synchro Compur MXV	1-1/500 + B; M&X-sync	
2.8E2	K7E2	Aug 1959	Mar 1960	Schneider Xenotar or Zeiss Planar	f/2.8	Heidosmat	f/2.8	Synchro Compur MXV	1-1/500 + B; M&X-sync	With self-timer
2.8E2	K7E3	Mar 1962	Jan 1965	Schneider Xenotar or Zeiss Planar	f/2.8	Heidosmat	f/2.8	Synchro Compur MXV	1-1/500 + B; M&X-sync	With self-timer
2.8F	K7F	Jun 1960	Dec 1965	Zeiss Planar	f/2.8	Heidosmat	f/2.8	Synchro Compur MXV	1-1/500 + B; M&X-sync	With self-timer
2.8F	K7F2	Jan 1966	Dec 1966	Zeiss Planar	f/2.8	Heidosmat	f/2.8	Synchro Compur MXV	1-1/500 + B; M&X-sync	With self-timer
2.8F	K7F3	Jan 1967	Jan 1973	Zeiss Planar	f/2.8	Heidosmat	f/2.8	Synchro Compur MXV	1-1/500 + B; M&X-sync	With self-timer
2.8F	K7F4	Jan 1973	Oct 1981	Schneider Xenotar	f/2.8	Heidosmat	f/2.8	Synchro Compur MXV	1-1/500 + B; M&X-sync	With self-timer

==== Rolleiflex 2.8A ====
Incorporated the first 8 cm f2.8 taking lens (an 80 mm Tessar, either by Carl Zeiss Jena Zeiss Opton [Oberkochen]) into the Rolleiflex line. It also added an X flash synch contact. Built from 1949 to 1951.

==== Rolleiflex 2.8E ====
Released in October 1956, this was the first model with a built in, uncoupled light meter as an option.

Rolleiflex 3.5 TLR cameras (C/E/F/T)
Camera		Dates		Taking lens (FL=75 mm)		Viewing lens (FL=75 mm)		Shutter		Notes
Name	Model	Intro.	Disc.	Name	Ap.	Name	Ap.	Name	Speeds	Notes
3.5C	K4C	Oct 1956	Feb 1959	Zeiss Planar	f/3.5	Heidosmat	f/2.8	Synchro Compur MXV	1-1/500 + B; M&X-sync	
3.5C	K4C	Apr 1957	Feb 1959	Schneider Xenotar	f/3.5	Heidosmat	f/2.8	Synchro Compur MXV	1-1/500 + B; M&X-sync	
T (K8)	T1	Oct 1958	Jun 1961	Tessar	f/3.5	Heidosmat	f/2.8	Synchro Compur MXV	1-1/500 + B; M&X-sync	
T (K8)	T2	Jul 1961	Jul 1966	Tessar	f/3.5	Heidosmat	f/2.8	Synchro Compur MXV	1-1/500 + B; M&X-sync	
T (K8)	T3	Jul 1966	Aug 1976	Tessar	f/3.5	Heidosmat	f/2.8	Synchro Compur VX	1-1/500 + B; M&X-sync	Includes self-timer
3.5F (Model 1)	K4E	Dec 1958	Feb 1960	Zeiss Planar	f/3.5	Heidosmat	f/2.8	Synchro Compur MXV	1-1/500 + B; M&X-sync	With self-timer
3.5F (Model 1)	K4E	Dec 1958	Feb 1960	Schneider Xenotar	f/3.5	Heidosmat	f/2.8	Synchro Compur MXV	1-1/500 + B; M&X-sync	With self-timer
3.5E2	K4C2	Dec 1959	Apr 1960	Zeiss Planar or Schneider Xenotar	f/3.5	Heidosmat	f/2.8	Synchro Compur MX	1-1/500 + B; M&X-sync	With self-timer
3.5E2	K4C3	Jun 1960	May 1962	Zeiss Planar or Schneider Xenotar	f/3.5	Heidosmat	f/2.8	Synchro Compur MX	1-1/500 + B; M&X-sync	With self-timer
3.5F (Model 2)	K4E	Feb 1960	Nov 1960	Zeiss Tessar	f/3.5	Heidosmat	f/2.8	Synchro Compur MXV	1-1/500 + B; M&X-sync	With self-timer
3.5F (Model 2)	K4E	Feb 1960	Nov 1960	Schneider Xenotar	f/3.5	Heidosmat	f/2.8	Synchro Compur MXV	1-1/500 + B; M&X-sync	With self-timer
3.5F (Model 3)	K4F	Nov 1960	Dec 1964	Zeiss Tessar or Opton	f/3.5	Heidosmat	f/2.8	Synchro Compur MXV	1-1/500 + B; M&X-sync	With self-timer
3.5F (Model 3)	K4F1	Jan 1965	Dec 1976	Schneider Xenotar	f/3.5	Heidosmat	f/2.8	Synchro Compur MXV	1-1/500 + B; M&X-sync	With self-timer
3.5E2	K4C3	Jun 1961	May 1962	Zeiss Planar or Schneider Xenotar	f/3.5	Heidosmat	f/2.8	Synchro Compur MX	1-1/500 + B; M&X-sync	With self-timer
3.5E3	K4G	Jul 1961	Jan 1965	Zeiss Planar or Schneider Xenotar	f/3.5	Heidosmat	f/2.8	Synchro Compur MX	1-1/500 + B; M&X-sync	With self-timer

==== Rolleiflex T ====
Released in 1959, this camera came in a new color of gray. The camera was most successful for it was more affordable to the public. The camera had a 75mm Tessar lens made of lanthanum glass, giving higher resolution and color correction.

Tele and Wide Rolleiflex TLR cameras
Camera		Dates		Taking lens			Viewing lens			Shutter		Notes
Name	Model	Intro.	Disc.	Name	FL (mm)	Ap.	Name	FL (mm)	Ap.	Name	Speeds	Notes
Tele	K7S	Sep 1959	1975	Zeiss Sonnar	135	f/4	Heidosmat	135	f/4	Synchro Compur MXV	1–1/500+B; X-sync	Based on K7E; includes self-timer
Wide	K7W	Apr 1961	Dec 1967	Zeiss Distagon	55	f/4	Heidosmat	55	f/4	Synchro Compur MXV	1–1/500+B; X-sync	Based on K7E; includes self-timer

==== Tele Rolleiflex ====
This camera used a 135 mm/f4.0 Carl Zeiss Sonnar taking lens. The introduction to a 1990 sale catalogue by Sotheby's auction house in London estimated that approximately 1200 cameras existed at that date.

The new Tele Rolleiflex uses 135mm/f4 Schneider Tele-Xenar taking lens.

==== Wide Rolleiflex ====
This camera had a 55 mm/f4.0 Carl Zeiss Distagon taking lens. The introduction to a 1990 sale catalogue by Sotheby's auction house in London estimated that fewer than 700 such cameras existed at that date. Only 3600 models were originally produced.

The new Wide Rolleiflex uses a 50mm/f4 Schneider Super-Angulon taking lens.

=== SLR models ===
Rolleiflex SLR timeline
System	1960s										1970s										1980s										1990s										2000s										2010s										2020s									
System	0	1	2	3	4	5	6	7	8	9	0	1	2	3	4	5	6	7	8	9	0	1	2	3	4	5	6	7	8	9	0	1	2	3	4	5	6	7	8	9	0	1	2	3	4	5	6	7	8	9	0	1	2	3	4	5	6	7	8	9	0	1	2	3	4	5	6	7	8	9
SL66							SL66																				SL66SE																																											
SL66																							SL66E				SL66X																																											
6×6E																									6006																							Hy6																						
6×6E																													6008																																									
6×6E																	SLX										6002								6003																																			
6×6E																																							6001																															
QBM											SL35							SL35M / SL35ME				SL2000F					SL3003																																											
QBM																	SL350				SL35 E																																																	

==== Rolleiflex SL66 ====
Rollei's first medium-format SLR, introduced in 1966.

==== Rolleiflex SL35 ====
A 35 mm SLR introduced in 1970.

=== Others ===
==== Rolleiflex miniature Reproductions ====
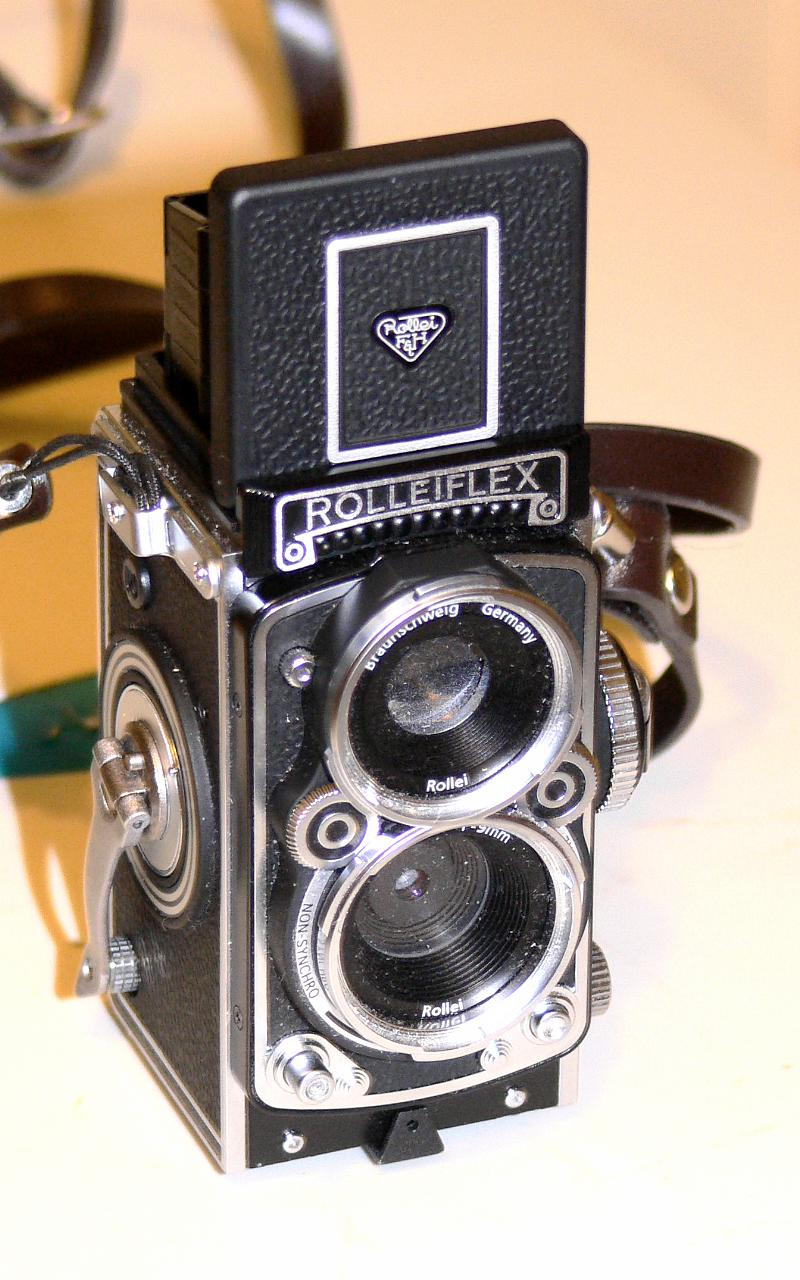
Rolleiflex minidigi digital camera

There are two models of miniature Rolleiflex cameras. These are not true Rolleiflex cameras but are miniature reproductions of the Rolleiflex TLR design produced under licence by the German camera manufacturer Minox. The cameras are manufactured by the Japanese company Sharan Megahouse. One model is a miniature digital camera, the other is a miniature Rolleiflex TLR film camera.

The original model, now discontinued, was the Rolleiflex MiniDigi, a miniature reproduction of the TLR Rolleiflex. In many details the camera retained the look of the original, including a waist-level viewfinder and a crank to prepare the camera for the next shot. As the name implies, the camera was a digital reproduction, with the "viewing" lens being a dummy. The camera had a 2 megapixel CMOS sensor in the square format of the traditional TLR. The lens was a 9 mm f/2.8 with five elements, focusing down to 10 cm. The shutter speeds were automatically controlled between 1/15 to 1/400 second, exposure time was automatic. The camera was operated by a single CR2 battery. The storage media were either SD or MMC cards.

This was superseded by the MINOX DCC (Digital Classic Camera) Rolleiflex AF 5.0. The name change brings the current model more firmly in line with the rest of Minox's Classic Camera miniature reproduction range. It is visually identical to the original model, but available in both black and red leather finishes. The CMOS sensor has been upgraded to 3 megapixels, with 5.0 megapixels available by interpolation. The taking lens is a 4.9 mm f/2.8; the camera has digital autofocus. The electronic shutter has also been upgraded to a maximum speed of 1/2500 of a second. The camera operates on a single CR2 battery and uses miniSD memory cards.

There was also a 1/3 scale miniature Rolleiflex TLR, using Minox film, producing 36 exposures of 8x11mm format negative.

== List of models ==
=== TLR (twin-lens reflex) ===
==== Tessar models ====
Rolleiflex Cameras—7.5 cm (f: 2.8, 3.5, 3.8)

- Original Rolleiflex: 1929–32
- Standard Rolleiflex: 1932–38
- New Standard Rolleiflex: 1938–41
- Rolleiflex Automat: 1937–39
- Rolleiflex Automat: 1939–49 (double bayonet)
- Rolleiflex Automat X: 1949–51
- Rolleiflex Automat A (MX in North America): 1951–54
- Rolleiflex Automat B (MX-EVS in North America): 1954–56
- Rolleiflex 4×4: 1931–38 Baby Rolleiflex (1930s) (6 cm f:3.5 or 2.8 Tessar lens)
- Rolleiflex 4×4: 1938–41 Sports Baby Rolleiflex (6 cm f:2.8 Tessar Only)
- Rolleiflex 2.8A: 1950–51
- Rolleiflex T: 1958–75 (no Automat film transport and with f:3.5 Tessar lens only. Grey or Black)

==== Baby Rolleiflex ====
===== Pre-war =====
- Rolleiflex 4×4: 1931–38 Baby Rolleiflex (1930s) (6 cm f:3.5 or 2.8 Tessar lens) Two models, with rim set shutter and f. Deckel made diaphragm control, or with Rollei made levers on the shutter and a small shutter speed, f-number indicator window above the viewing lens. So in the first model of Pre-War Baby Rolleiflex there are actually four different cameras.
- Rolleiflex 4×4: 1938–41 Sports Baby Rolleiflex (6 cm f:2.8 Tessar Only) New fast focus with larger knob, front cover like a Rolleicord II, with early cameras having only one bayonet, and later cameras with two.

===== Post-war =====
- Rolleiflex 4×4: 1957–63 (Schneider, 6 cm f:3.5 Xenar lens, on all post war Rolleiflex 4×4 cameras)
- Rolleiflex 4×4 Black: 1963–69 (rare) By serial numbers 9,120 were made.

==== Non-Tessar models (letter models) ====
Planar or Xenotar lenses. f/2.8 cameras have 8 cm focal length, f/3.5 have 7.5 cm

- Rolleiflex 2.8B: 1952–53, 8 cm Biometar lens (Rare)
- Rolleiflex 2.8C: 1953–55, 8 cm f:2.8 Schneider Kreuznach Xenotar only
- Rolleiflex 2.8D: 1955–56, 8 cm f:2.8 Carl Zeiss Planar or Xenotar
- Rolleiflex 2.8E: 1956–59, (option for uncoupled meter)
- Rolleiflex 2.8E2: 1959–60
- Rolleiflex 2.8E3: 1962–65
- Rolleiflex 3.5 C (E1 in North America): 1956–59 (optional uncoupled light meter)
- Rolleiflex 3.5E2: 1959–62
- Rolleiflex 3.5E3: 1962–65

==== Coupled exposure meter, removable focus hood ====
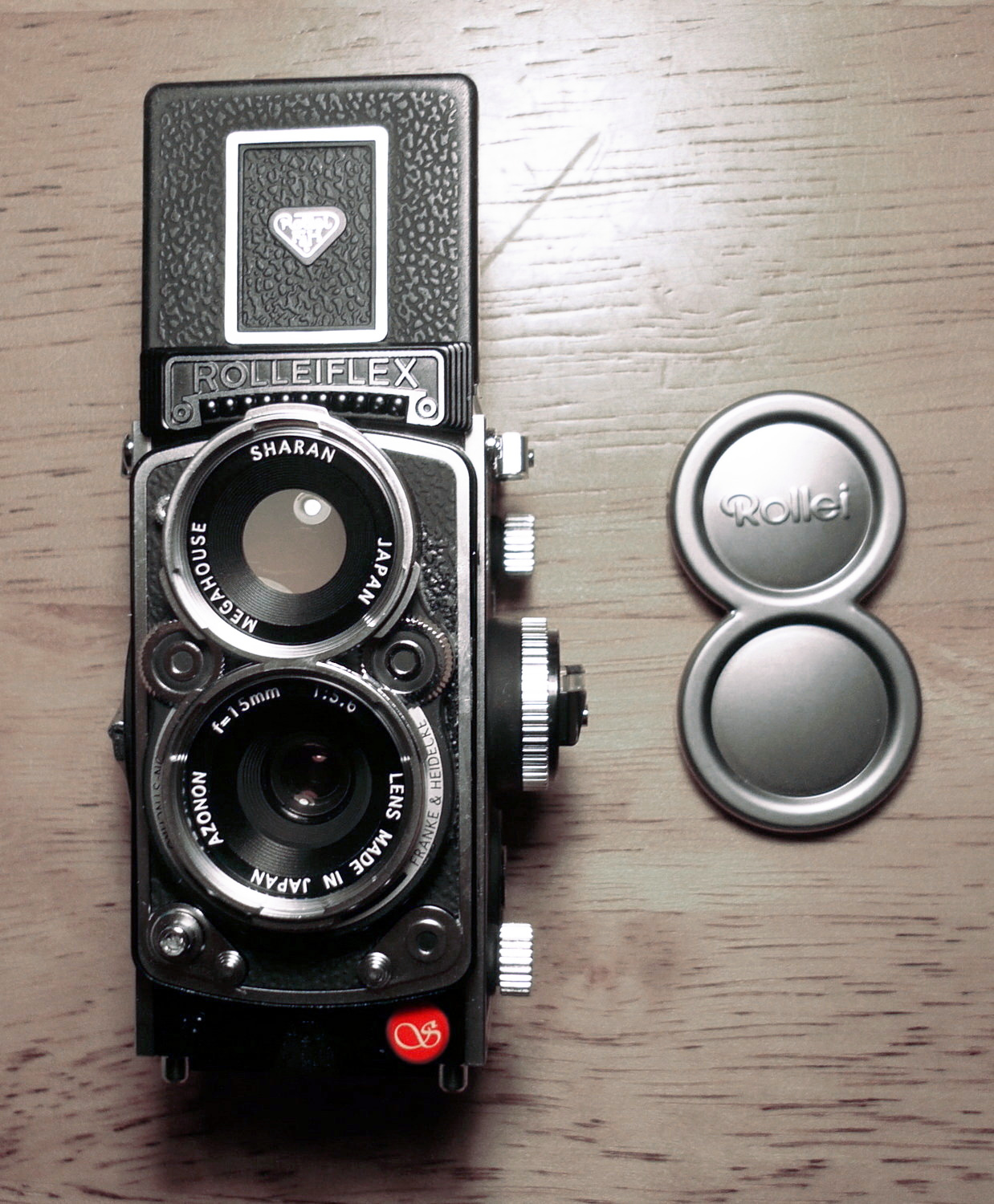
Sharan (Megahouse) miniature TLR "Rolleiflex 2.8F", uses Minox film cartridges

The F model introduced coupled exposure metering and removable focus hood on all subsequent models

- Rolleiflex 2.8F: 1960–81 (various models)
- Rolleiflex 2.8F Aurum: 1983
- Rolleiflex 2.8F Platinum: 1987
- Rolleiflex 2.8GX: 1989 (from this model onward the Automat film transport was replaced with transport similar to the "T" model)
- Rolleiflex 2.8FX (2002–2012)
- Rolleiflex 2.8FX-N (2012–2015)

==== Specialty cameras ====
Rollei responded to the introduction of the Mamiya C line of TLRs with two models, the Tele Rolleiflex (equipped with a 135 mm lens), and the Rollei Wide (with 55 mm).

- Tele Rolleiflex: 1959–75 (Zeiss Sonnar)
- Rolleiflex Wide: 1961–67 (Zeiss Distagon)
- Wide Rolleiflex 4.0 FW (Schneider Angulon)—classic reissue.
- Tele Rolleiflex 4.0 FT (Tele-Xenar)—classic reissue.
- Rolleiflex 2.8F Mini

==== Miniatures ====
Reproductions by Minox

- Rolleiflex MiniDigi
- DCC Rolleiflex AF 5.0

=== SLRs (single-lens reflex cameras) ===
==== Medium format SLRs ====
- Rolleiflex SL66
- Rolleiflex SL66 E
- Rolleiflex SL66 X
- Rolleiflex SL66 SE
- Rolleiflex SLX
- Rolleiflex SLX Metric
- Rolleiflex 6002
- Rolleiflex 6006
- Rolleiflex 6006 Metric
- Rolleiflex 6008 Professional
- Rolleiflex 6008 LR Professional
- Rolleiflex 6008 Metric 3D Industrial
- Rolleiflex 6008 Professional Gold
- Rolleiflex 6008 Professional SRC 1000
- Rolleiflex 6003 SRC 1000
- Rolleiflex 6008 ChipPack Digital Metric
- Rolleiflex 6008 E
- Rolleiflex 6008 Q 16 Digital Metric
- Rolleiflex 6008 AF
- Rolleiflex 6008 integral
- Rolleiflex 6008 integral2
- Rolleiflex 6008 Metric
- Rolleiflex 6003 Professional
- Rolleiflex 6001 Professional
- X-Act_{2} view camera
- Rolleiflex Hy6
- Rolleiflex Hy6 Mod2

==== 35 mm SLRs ====
- Rolleiflex SL35
- Rolleiflex SL350
- Rolleiflex SL35M
- Rolleiflex SL35ME
- Rolleiflex SL35E
- Rolleiflex SL 2000 F
- Rolleiflex SL 3003
- Rolleiflex SL 3001
