= Peggy Bacon (radio producer) =

English radio and television producer and radio presenter

- Born: Margaret Bacon; 19 November 1918; Kings Heath
- Died: 1 March 1976 (aged 57); London
- Alma mater: King Edward VI High School for Girls
- Occupation: Radio producer, radio personality, television producer, nurse
- Employer: BBC

Margaret Bacon (19 November 1918 – 1 March 1976), who worked under the name Peggy Bacon, was a BBC radio and television producer and radio presenter.

== Early life and education ==
Bacon was born on 19 November 1918 in Kings Heath, Birmingham, England, to Arthur Charles Bacon and Doris Elizabeth, née Day. She was educated at the city's King Edward VI High School for Girls from 1931 to 1936.

== Career ==
She joined the BBC in Birmingham as a secretary in 1938 before working as a Red Cross nurse, treating wounded servicemen at an emergency hospital in Birmingham for several months in 1940, during World War II.

She produced and presented - as "Aunty Peggy" - the BBC Home Service radio programme Children's Hour for almost 20 years, with the Radio Times first listing her appearance on 17 September 1947. She also edited a B.B.C. Children's Hour Annual book, for the BBC.

After meeting two railway-enthusiast film makers, she commissioned them to work on Railway Roundabout, a television series, episodes of which she also produced, and which ran from 1958 to 1962.

She commissioned Brian Vaughton to make the documentary The Cats Whiskers: celebrating forty years of broadcasting from the heart of England, broadcast on the Home Service (Midland) on 12 November 1962. In 1965, after she made a successful series of programmes for O-level students, she was transferred to the BBC's education department, in London. While there, she edited F. D. Flower's Reading to Learn: An Approach to Critical Reading (BBC, 1969).

== Personal life and death ==
In her leisure time, she was a singer and linguist, and translated song lyrics from French and German, some of which were broadcast.

She retired in 1975 and died in London on 1 March 1976, aged 57.
