= Topcon RE Super =

35mm camera

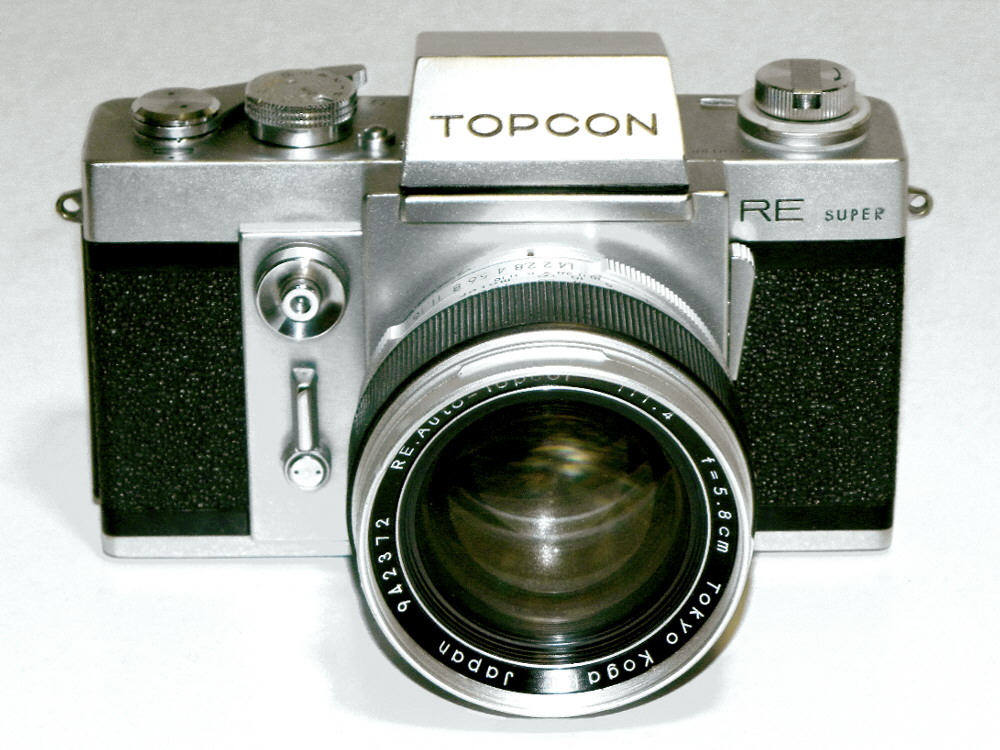

Overview
- Type: 35mm camera

Lens
- Lens mount: Exakta bayonet

Focusing
- Focus: Manual

Exposure/metering
- Exposure: 24 × 36 mm on 35mm film

The Topcon RE Super, or Beseler Topcon Super D in USA, was launched by Tokyo Kogaku KK in 1963 and manufactured until 1971, at which point it was upgraded to the Super D and again to Super DM the following year. General sale continued for several years. These later models have a shutter release lock lever on the shutter release collar. It is a professional oriented 35mm SLR camera that had a comprehensive range of accessories available. It has a removable pentaprism viewfinder and focusing screen. It features the Exakta bayonet lens mount for interchangeable lenses. A special accessory shoe is situated at the base of the rewind knob with a standard PC sync. contact next to it. The release button is placed at the right-hand camera front, but there is no mirror-up facility; this was included on the upgraded versions. The standard lens is the RE. Auto-Topcor 1:1.4 f=5.8cm or the slightly slower 1:1.8 version. A battery-operated winder could be attached to the camera base.

Some common features of 35mm SLR photography were first seen on the Topcon RE Super. Among these is the through-the-lens exposure metering. This enabled improved exposure accuracy, especially in close-up macro photography using bellows or extension rings, and in telephotography with long lenses. In addition to this feature, the metering is at full aperture. For this purpose the RE-lenses have an aperture simulator that relays the preset aperture to the exposure meter at full aperture, retaining a bright viewfinder image while determining the correct exposure, avoiding the stop-down method. The meter also works independently of the pentaprism finder, which allows for different viewfinder configurations. The meter cell is actually incorporated in the camera's reflex finder mirror. This was accomplished by milling narrow slits in the mirror surface letting a fraction of the light through to the CdS cell placed just behind it.

Identifying the different models (elsewhere/USA)

- Topcon RE Super / Beseler Topcon Super D: type 46A, serial no. prefix 46. Prod. period: 1963 to 1971
- Topcon Super D / Beseler Topcon Super D: type 71A, serial no. prefix 71. Prod. period: 1972 only
- Topcon Super DM / Topcon Super DM: type 72A, serial no. prefix 72. Prod. period: 1973 only

All models were available in chrome or black enamel finish.

Tokyo Kogaku KK

Tokyo Kogaku KK launched their first 35mm SLR camera in 1957, about two years before the Nikon F and the Canonflex. This was the Topcon R, with bayonet lens mount from the Exakta Varex camera from Ihagee in Dresden, successor to the Kine Exakta of 1936. It was also inspired by the Zeiss Ikon Contax S as well as the Japanese Miranda T—most obviously the body shape by the former, and the detachable finder prism by the latter. However, it was not until 1963 the Topcon name became famous by introducing the Topcon RE Super, an event that took the entire camera industry by surprise: This camera featured through-the-lens (TTL) exposure metering, at full lens aperture. The RE Super was fully prepared for professional work, supported by a choice of lenses and accessories to complement it. The United States importer was the Charles Beseler Company and it was sold as the Beseler Topcon Super D.

The interchangeable lenses for the RE Super

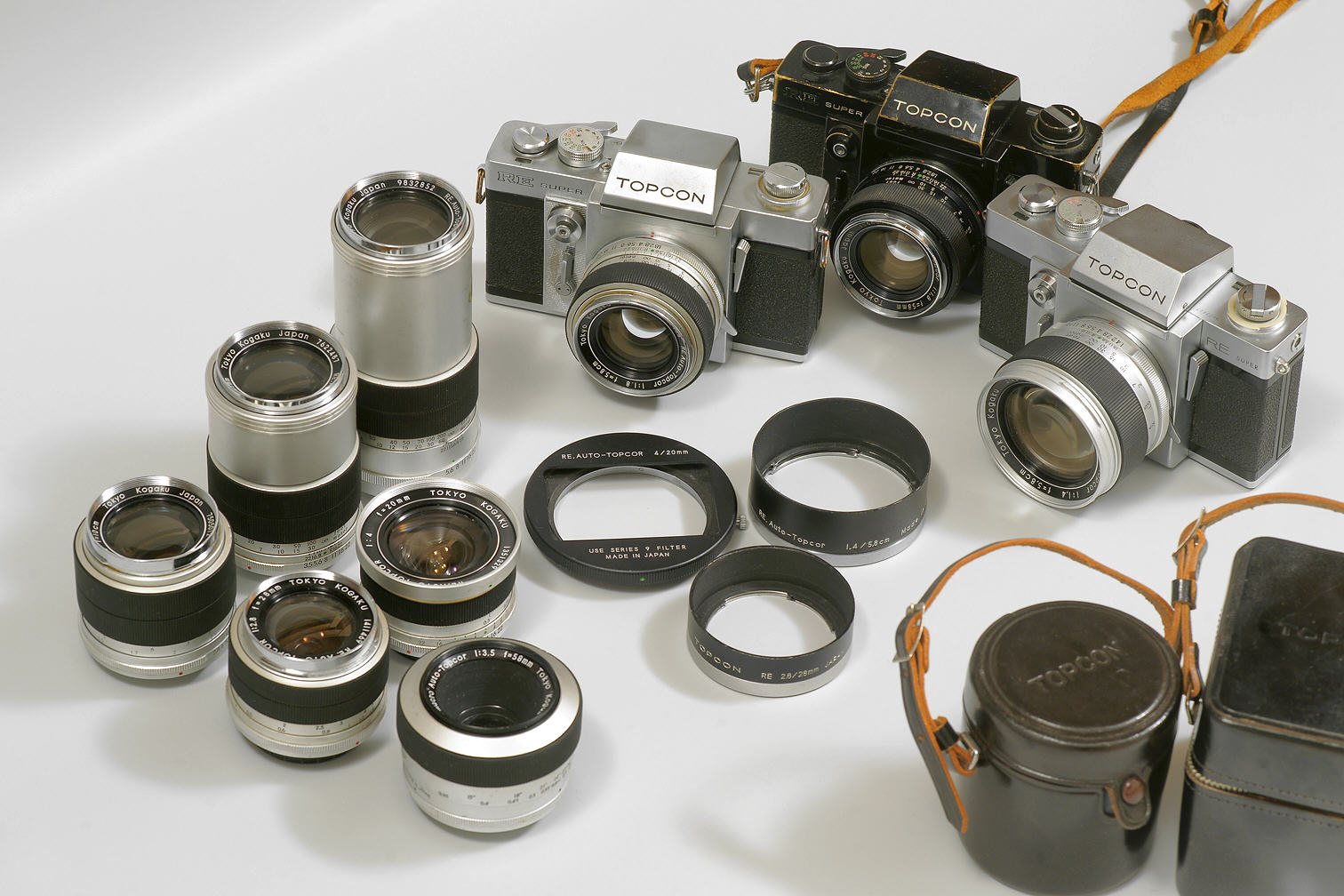
Camera with array of lenses and filters

The following lenses have their own focusing thread:

- RE. Auto-Topcor 1:4.0 f= 20mm 62 mm filter, introduced 1969
- RE. Auto-Topcor 1:3.5 f= 25mm 62 mm filter, introduced 1965
- RE. Auto-Topcor 1:2.8 f= 28mm 49 mm filter, introduced 1971
- RE. Auto-Topcor 1:2.8 f= 35mm 49 mm filter, introduced 1963
- RE. GN Auto-Topcor 1:1.8 f= 50mm 62 mm filter, introduced 1973 with lens aperture interconnected to distance set on the lens' focusing ring.
- RE. GN Auto-Topcor M 1:1.4 f= 50mm 62 mm filter, introduced 1973 with lens aperture interconnected to distance set on the lens' focusing ring.
- RE. Auto-Topcor 1:1.4 f= 58mm 62 mm filter, introduced 1963
- RE. Auto-Topcor 1:1.8 f= 58mm 49 mm filter, introduced 1963
- RE. Macro Auto-Topcor 1:3.5 f=58mm 49 mm filter
- RE. Auto-Topcor 1:1.8 f= 85mm 62 mm filter, introduced 1973
- RE. Auto-Topcor 1:2.8 f= 100mm 49 mm filter, introduced 1965
- RE. Auto-Topcor 1:3.5 f= 135mm 49 mm filter, introduced 1963
- RE. Auto-Topcor 1:5.6 f= 200mm 49 mm filter, introduced 1966
- RE. Auto-Topcor 1:5.6 f= 300mm 62 mm filter, introduced 1965
- RE. Auto-Topcor 1:5.6 f= 500mm, introduced 1969
- RE. Zoom Auto-Topcor 1:4.7 f= 87~205mm 58 mm filter, introduced 1967

In addition, a range of special lenses without focusing thread (to be used with bellows or focusing extension tube) were available for macro work:

- Macro Topcor 1:3.5 f= 30mm
- Macro Topcor 1:3.5 f= 58mm
- Macro Topcor 1:4 f= 135mm
