= Sokkia =

Business

Sokkia Co., Ltd.
- Type: Public K.K.
- Traded as: TYO: 7720
- Industry: High precision instruments for construction, surveying and industrial applications
- Founded: 1920
- Headquarters: Atsugi, Kanagawa, Japan
- Key people: Jin Ito
- Products: Total station
- Number of employees: 333
- Parent: Topcon
- Subsidiaries: 19
- Website: http://www.sokkia.com

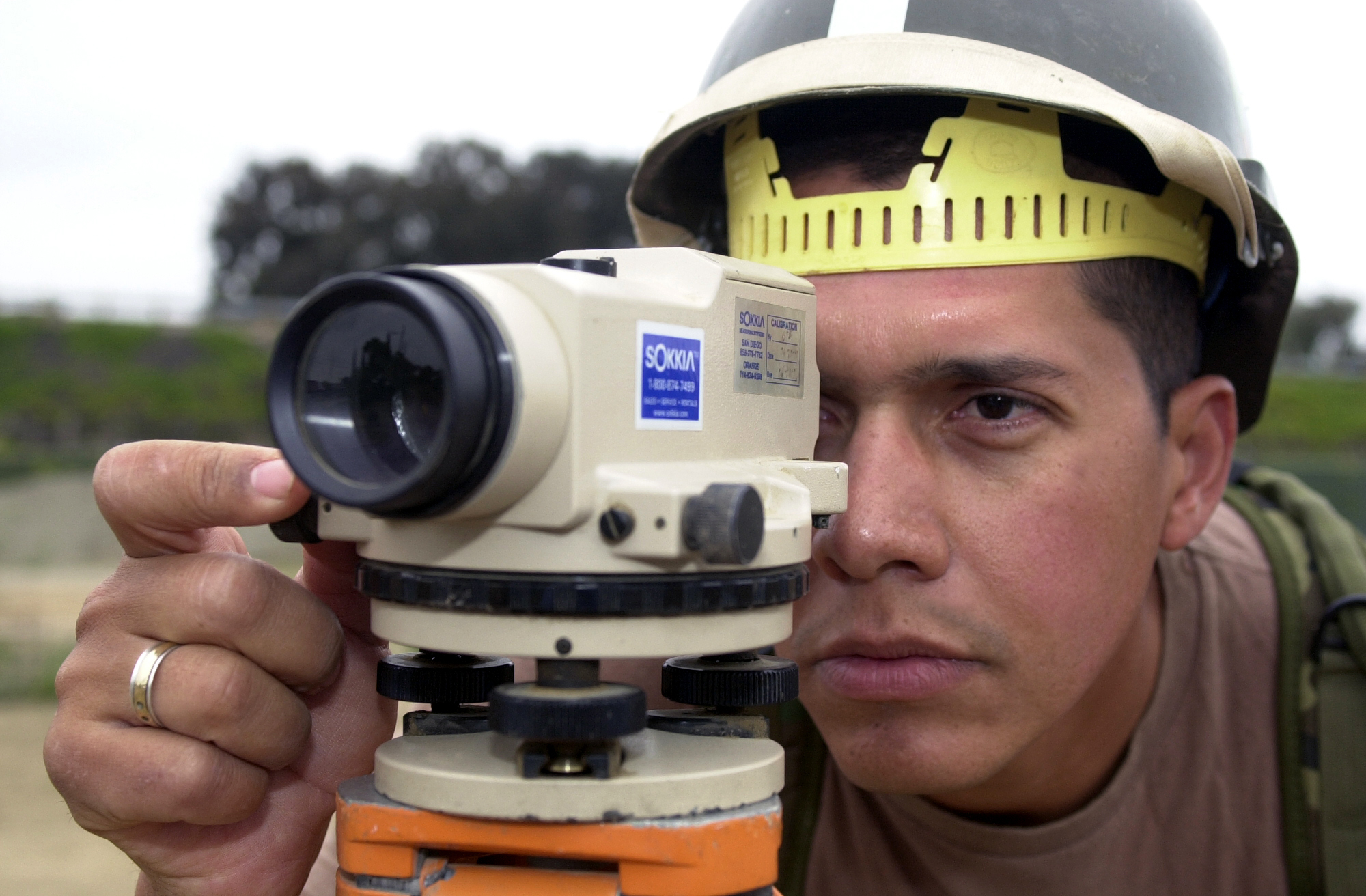
Sokkia level

Sokkia Co., Ltd. was founded in 1920 as Sokkisha in Japan. It makes measurement instruments for the surveying, construction and industrial measurement industries. In 2008 Sokkia was acquired by Topcon, but still maintains a separate brand.

== History ==
In the beginning, the company was called Sokkisha Company and was founded by a group of 13 people. It started with manufacturing transits in a small workshop in Tokyo in 1920. At first limited to the Japanese market, Sokkisha began to develop precision measuring instruments and quickly became a popular manufacturer in Japan. The worldwide expansion started with the United States. The American company Lietz became the exclusive distributor for Sokkisha instruments in the 1970s. In 1984 Sokkisha took over Lietz and becoming the world's largest manufacturer of surveying and measuring instruments.

In the early 1990s, Sokkisha started a corporate identity project to improve and expand the company's global marketing. The result of this project was a new brand name: Sokkia. In 2008, Sokkia became a wholly owned subsidiary of Topcon.

== Achievements ==
The company's major achievements include the development and production of Japan's first automatic levels, theodolite and coaxial total station. In 1964, Sokkisha developed the company's patented magnetically damped compensator for automatic levels, which quickly became the world standard.

== Products ==
Products for Surveying from Sokkia are GNSS systems, robotic total stations, reflectorless total stations, automatic / digital levels, field / desktop software etc.

Products for Construction from Sokkia are rotating lasers, line lasers, machine control receivers, levels, theodolites, total stations etc.

Products for Industrial from Sokkia are industrial total stations, 3-DIM industrial software, special magnetic targets, dedicated business partner alliance with German industrial applications specialists.

== See also ==
- Total station EDM
