= GPS in the earthmoving industry =

GPS when applied in the earthmoving industry can be a viable asset to contractors and increase the overall efficiency of the job. Since GPS satellite positioning information is free to the public, it allows for everyone to take advantage of its uses. Heavy equipment manufacturers, in conjunction with GPS guidance system manufacturers, have been co-developing GPS guidance systems for heavy equipment since the late 1990s. These systems allow the equipment operator to use GPS position data to make decisions based on actual grade and design features. Some heavy equipment guidance systems can even operate the machine's implements automatically from a set design that was created for the particular jobsite. GPS guidance systems can have tolerances as small as two to three centimeters making them extremely accurate compared to relying on the operator's skill level. Since the machine's GPS system has the ability to know when it is off the design grade, this can reduce surveying and material costs required for a specific job.

== History ==
GPS Technology was officially introduced as a guidance system for earthmoving machines in the late 1990s. Since this time, many manufacturers of earthmoving equipment now offer GPS and other guidance systems, as a factory option. Many companies exist that also sell GPS guidance systems for the earthmoving industry as a retrofit option. The two main companies for heavy equipment guidance systems are Trimble and Topcon. In April 2002, Trimble and Caterpillar Inc. began a joint venture known as Caterpillar Trimble Controls Technology LLC (CTCT). "The joint venture develops machine control products that use site design information combined with accurate positioning technology to automatically control dozer blades and other machine tools". Though aftermarket kits were available from various companies to retrofit an existing machine for GPS guidance, Caterpillar Inc. was the first heavy equipment manufacturer to offer GPS guidance systems as a factory option from the dealer called an ARO (Attachment Ready Option). John Deere soon followed with their own version of ARO called "Integrated Grade Control" in 2006 on many Track-Type Tractors (TTT) and Motorgraders (MG).

== Types ==
While there are various GPS systems currently used in the heavy equipment industry, they can typically be categorized as either "indicate only" or "fully automatic". Both systems can utilize one or two GPS receivers. Using only one GPS receiver limits how the guidance system can orient the machine's position in respect to the site design. Using two GPS receivers gives the guidance system two points of position allowing it to calculate what angle the machine is on relative to the site plan. The following describes "indicate only" and "fully automatic" in more detail.

== Indicate only ==
Indicate only uses GPS positioning information as a guide to the operator. Depending on the system used, the machine position can be displayed over the specific design site that was created for the earthmoving project. This system relies on the operator to steer and move the machine's implements in order to match the site's design. Indicate only systems are typically cheaper and less complicated since they do not require hardware to tap into the machine's implement control systems. Indicate only systems typically utilize a single GPS receiver mounted on the machine itself and can use an angle sensor to calculate the machine's slope. Accuracy of these systems depends on if the site has a base station that can relay site specific corrections. If the site does not have a base station, indicate only systems can just use satellite information, however, the accuracy is usually in the one to two meter range.Utilizing a base station allows for site specific corrections to be transmitted to the machine, increasing the accuracy through Real Time Kinematics (RTK). Site specific corrections can increase the accuracy of an indicate only system to be around two to three centimeters. Machines that typically use indicate only consist of Soil Compactors (SC), Track-Type Tractors (TTT), and Motor Graders (MG). The use of a base station really depends on the accuracy requirements of the project. Some projects such as clearing overburden at a mine site with a TTT, may not need two to three centimeter accuracy while as grading a road base with a MG does.

== Fully automatic ==
Fully automatic systems allow the ability of the machine's implements to be controlled by the GPS guidance system. This is typically used in the fine grading applications where precise levels of material need to be moved on a predetermined design or grade. The advantages to this system is due to the accuracy that can be achieved with GPS and RTK, but requires an onsite base station. These systems can use either one or two GPS receivers and are mounted on the machine's blade. The more advanced systems use two receivers since it allows the machine to be controlled in a three-dimensional design. Fully automatic systems require the GPS guidance system to be integrated in the machine's implement controls. Some manufacturers sell the machine with these controls already integrated into the machine as an option. Aftermarket kits are available that can retrofit your existing machine to fully automatic control, but requires the GPS system to interface with the machine's implement controls. This is typically done one of two ways. If the machine's implements are controlled using electric over hydraulic (EH), the GPS system can input lever commands in parallel with the machine's implement lever. The output from the GPS system is interpreted by the machine's electronic control module as a lever command given by the operator and moves the implements accordingly. The second method for integrating GPS in the machine's implement controls is by adding a second pilot hydraulic valve in parallel with the machine's pilot hydraulic valve. This second valve is controlled by the GPS system and moves the implement valve according to the system design and blade location. Types of machines that use fully automatic GPS systems include TTT and MG.

== Applications ==
The key to successfully using GPS in the earthmoving industry is having an accurate site design. The site design, typically created by an engineering firm, can be imported from the original design file into the machine's GPS display. Most GPS guidance systems also have the ability to allow the operator to define a specific grade elevation or grade angle without a specific design. The following describes common machine applications that utilize GPS guidance systems.

Track-Type Tractors TTT are an extremely popular machine platform for GPS guidance systems specifically in the smaller sized models that are used for fine grading. Caterpillar Inc. and John Deere both offer fully automatic integrated GPS as an option from the factory on some of these models. One example of GPS being used on a TTT would be on a road project.

=== Motorgraders ===
Motorgraders are another popular machine platform since they also perform fine grading activities that can benefit from the GPS accuracy. Caterpillar Inc. and John Deere also offer some models with integrated GPS.

=== Hydraulic Excavators ===
Hydraulic excavators are just beginning to be integrated using GPS technology and are typically indicate only. Excavators use GPS technology in conjunction with angle sensors integrated in the machine's boom, stick, and bucket. This allows the operator to see how deep they are digging by comparing the actual bucket location to the site design on the GPS display. In recent years, Komatsu has released excavators offering semi-automatic functions. With these functions, the machine will automatically raise the boom and bucket to maintain the predetermined design grade. These machines also offer an auto stop function, preventing the bucket and boom function from lower beyond the predetermined design grade. https://www.youtube.com/watch?v=X0ELceB420I

=== Scrapers ===
Scrapers use GPS technology and are typically indicate only. The GPS antenna is typically mounted on the bowl of the scraper and allows the operator to compare the depth of the cut versus the site plan. This takes a lot of the ambiguity out of moving large amounts of material.

=== Compactors ===
GPS technology is applied in both trash compactors and soil compactors. Typical systems record where the compactor has been in order to create a map of the area's compaction. Usually the display has various colors that indicate that the machine has compacted the area.

== Financial Information ==
GPS systems typically have a high initial cost of around $100,000 per machine. When used properly GPS on average can increase productivity by as much as 30% over traditional methods. There is also cost reduction of material (since less is needed) because such high accuracy can be achieved. Some construction projects even require the use of GPS since it can bring down the overall cost of the project due to its efficiency advantages. Some GPS systems allow the user to switch systems to other machines making this tool very versatile. The contractor must plan for greater efficiency, since increasing one aspect of the job by 30% may not increase the overall efficiency, since another area may not be able to keep up. "If you do everything right and boost overall productivity say 30 percent, you’re going to have to line up 30 percent more work in the future or send crews home early".

== GPS Limitations ==
GPS is extremely versatile in the earthmoving industry, but it does have its limitations. GPS satellite signals can only be received in a non obstructed view of the sky with the exception of clouds. If a contractor wanted to perform grade work in preparation for a concrete floor within a building, for example, the roof would block the view to the GPS satellites, preventing the system from working. Working too close to a structure can also obstruct the machine's view of the sky creating dead zones. High-voltage power-lines can also create dead zones when working underneath them. GPS satellite coverage can also be weaker during certain parts of the day lowering the number of satellites the machine's system can use. This all depends on the geographical location and time of day. Improvements in GPS technology and the addition of GLONASS (Russian GNSS Satellites) satellites have reduced this issue. As mentioned earlier, in order to increase the overall accuracy of GPS you have to purchase and use a base station, which adds additional cost.

== Future use ==
GPS continues to be integrated in the construction industry and soon will be an industry standard. Autonomous cars that utilize GPS are currently being developed, and someday the earthmoving industry could incorporate such features. Already, new machines are coming equipped with GPS integrated from the factory. The possibilities are endless and who knows what other practical uses for GPS in the earthmoving industries will be discovered.

== Resources ==
The first user-oriented web resource for prospective 3D machine control users was created in 2010. The Kellogg Report publicized a detailed comparison of the major systems available on the market, evaluating more than 200 system features. The report continues to be updated as the technology evolves.
