= Novatron =

Novatron is a trademark referring to one of various products:

- 2D and 3D machine control products
- photographic lighting equipment
- the Mellotron keyboard musical instrument
- a series of Schmidt video projection monitors developed by Kloss Video Corporation
- a trade name of the drug Ondansetron
- Swedish fusion energy startup company Novatron Fusion Group
