= Exakta =

German camera brand

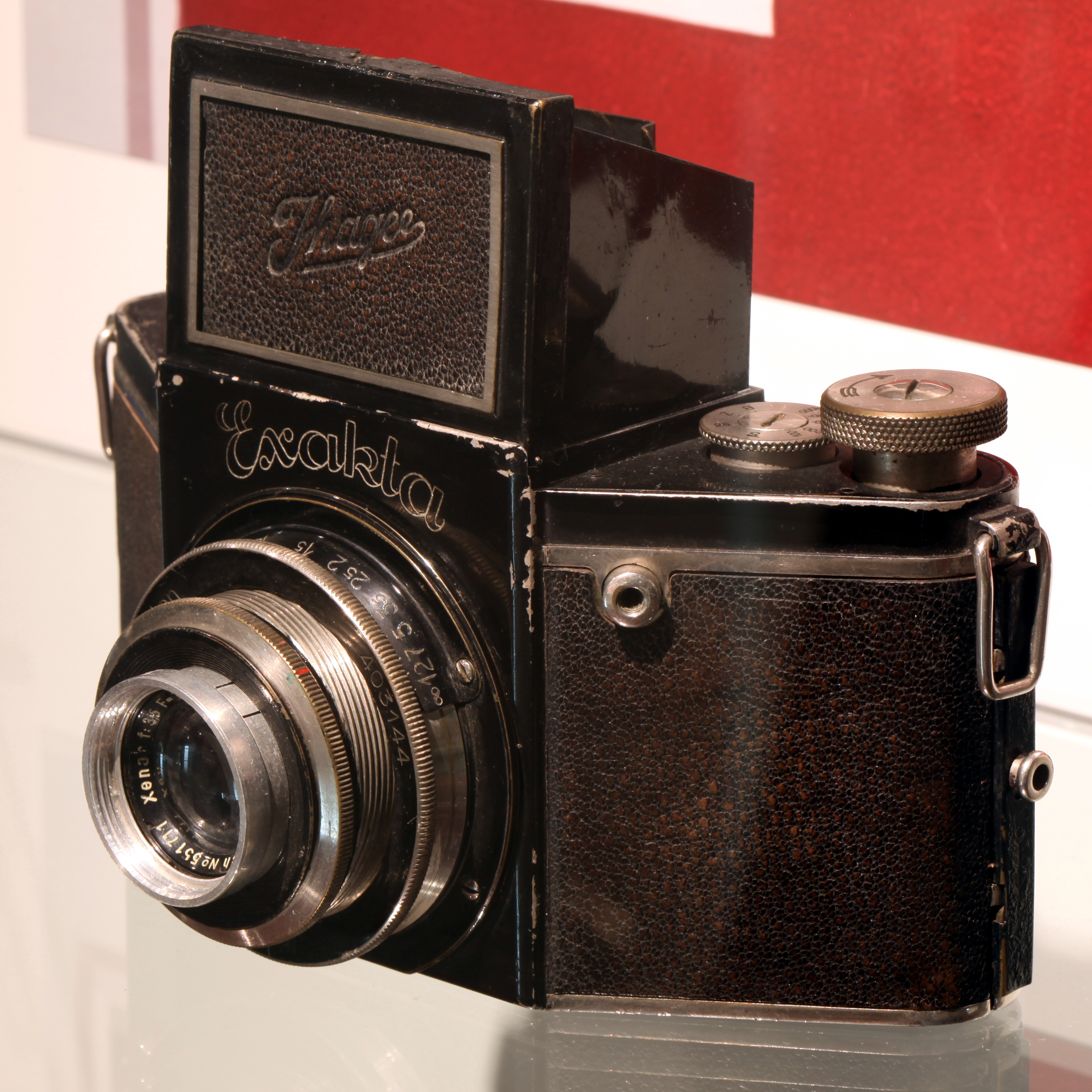
Roll film VP Exakta

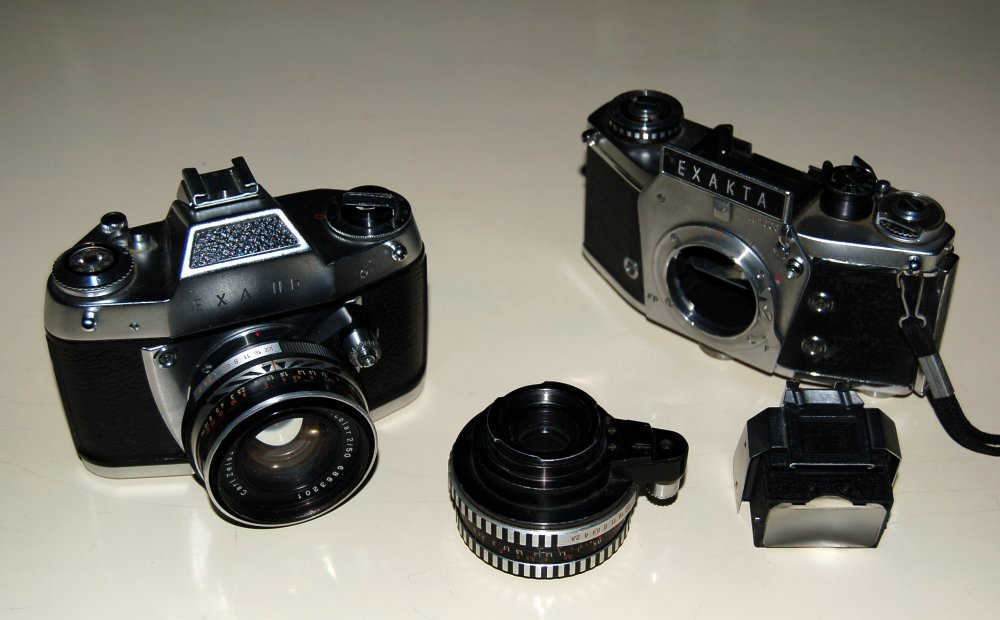
An Exa IIb and an Exakta Camera

The Exakta (sometimes Exacta) was a camera produced by the Ihagee Kamerawerk in Dresden, Germany, founded as the Industrie und Handels-Gesellschaft mbH, in 1912. The inspiration and design of both the VP Exakta and the Kine Exakta are the work of the Ihagee engineer Karl Nüchterlein (see Richard Hummel's Spiegelreflexkameras aus Dresden), who did not survive the Second World War.

An Exakta VX was used by James Stewart's character, a professional photographer, to spy on his possibly murderous neighbor in Alfred Hitchcock's Rear Window.

== Characteristics ==
Highlights of Exakta cameras include:

- First single-lens reflex camera (SLR) for 127 roll film (VP Exakta) came in 1933
- First wind-on lever in 1934
- First built-in flash socket, activated by the shutter, in 1935
- First popular SLR for 35mm film came in 1936, the Kine Exakta

Early Kine Exaktas had a fixed waist-level viewfinder, but later models, starting with the Exakta Varex, had an interchangeable waist- or eye-level finder. Examat and Travemat through-the-lens metering prisms were introduced in the mid 1960s. Most controls, including the shutter release and the film wind lever, are on the left-hand side, unlike many other cameras. The film is transported in the opposite direction to other 35mm SLRs. In classic Exaktas made between 1936 and 1969, two film canisters can be used, one containing unexposed film and a second into which is wound the exposed film. A sliding knife built into the bottom of the camera can be used to slice the film so that the canister containing the exposed film can be removed while preserving the unexposed film in the main canister. The knife was omitted in the Exakta VX500, one of the last "official" Exakta cameras.

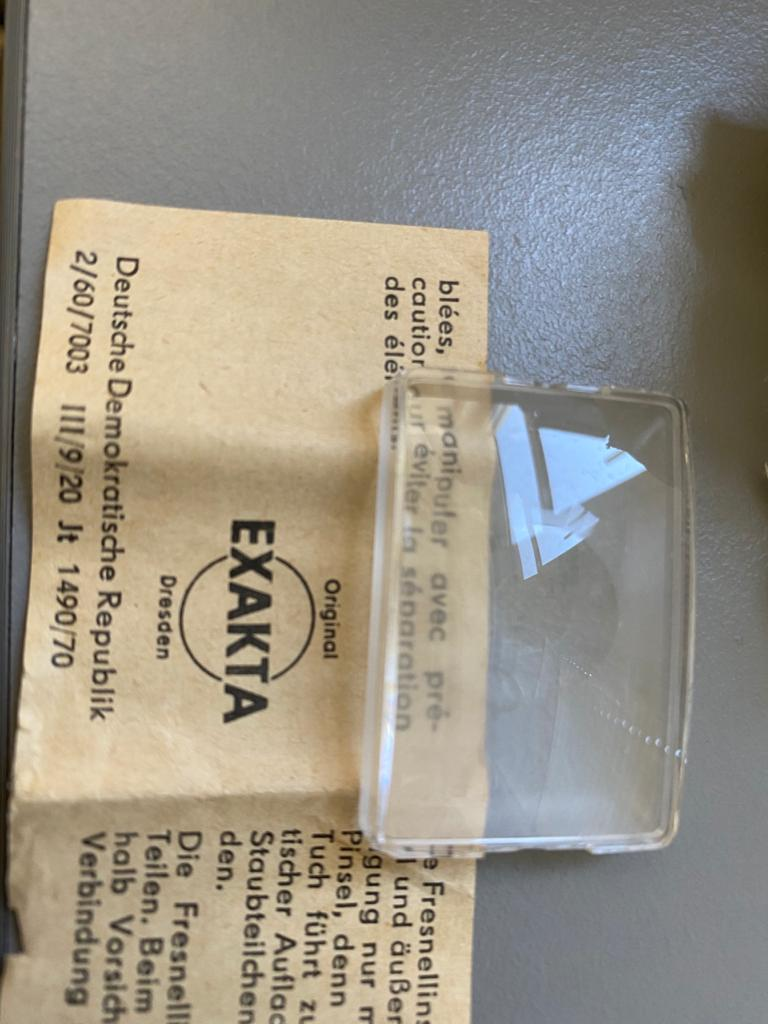
A viewfinder screen with instructions

The shutter release on classic Exaktas is on the front of the camera, rather than the top. It is pressed with the left forefinger. Amongst others, Topcon would use this bajonet mount for a time. This is quite similar to the Praktica design (that adapted it from Ihagee's product), the shutter-release of which was located on the right-hand side of the camera-body front. Most later lenses produced for Exaktas (Ihagee did not make their own lenses), known either as "automatic" or "semi-automatic" lenses, included a button in an extension that would align over the camera body's shutter release when the lens was mounted. The diaphragm of these lenses remained fully open, providing a bright viewfinder image, until the button was depressed halfway, when the iris would be stopped down to the shooting aperture; pressed further, the lens button engaged the camera's shutter release button, tripping the shutter.

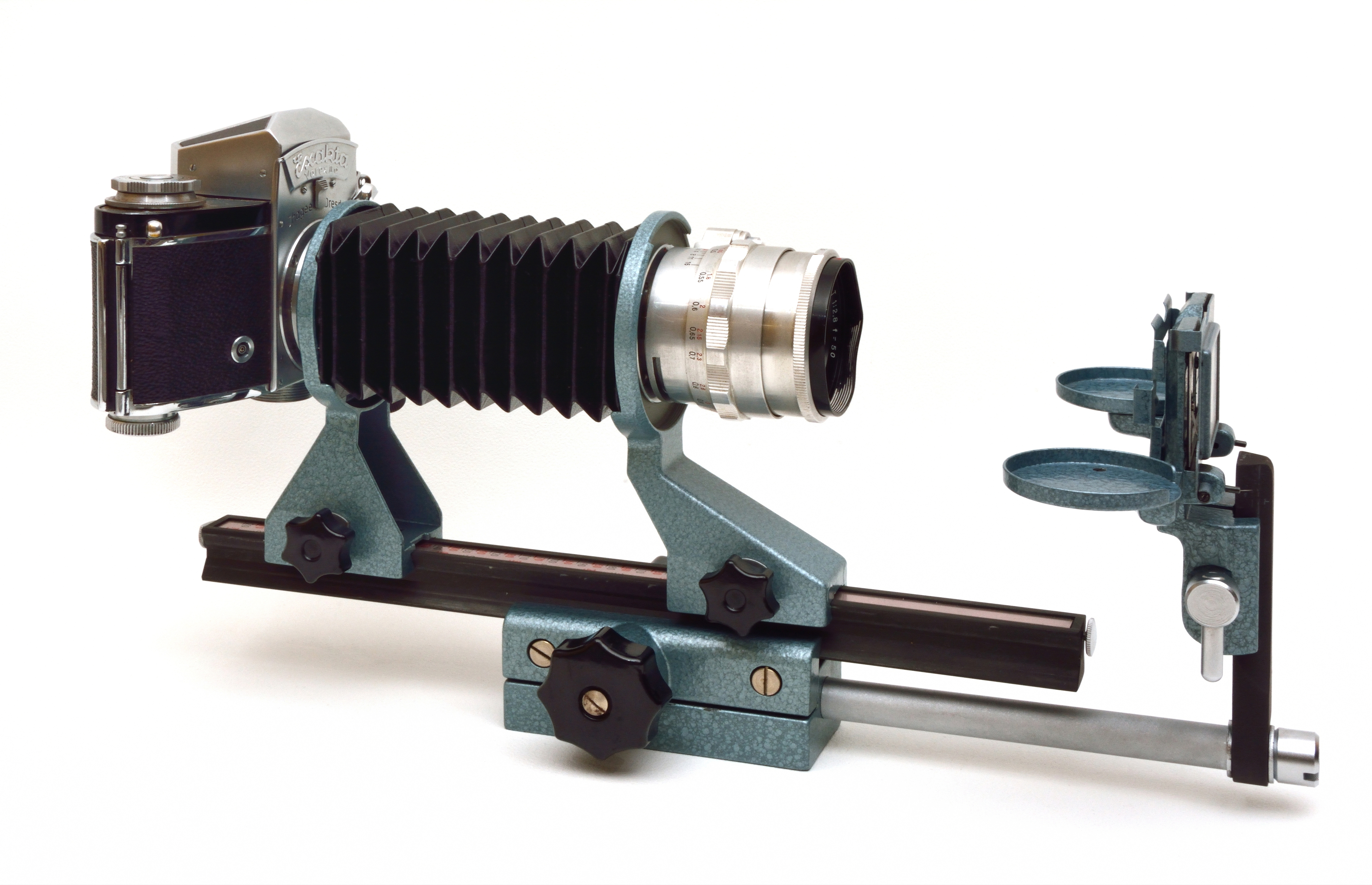
An Exakta Varex with bellows and slide copier

There was a full line of specialized equipment available for these system cameras that included microscope adaptor, extension bellows, stereo attachments, medical attachments and various specialized finder screens. Equipment is fully compatible between all models manufactured between 1936 and 1969. The spelling found on cameras has traditionally been Exakta, but some early Kine-Exaktas were marked Exacta specifically for marketing in France, Portugal and the U.S., perhaps for copyright reasons; and certainly a great number of American collectors refer to the whole range as the "Exacta." A related line of smaller, simpler cameras was the "Exa" line; these, too, existed in several variations. The Beseler Topcon line of 35mm cameras used the same lens mount as the Exakta. In the early 1970s, the Exakta "RTL 1000" was introduced; it accepted the older models' lenses, but had its own range of viewfinders, which included a model with through-the-lens light metering. M42 lens mount variants of the RTL line of cameras also appeared under the Praktica name.

After an economic collapse following Germany's reunification, the successor of the firm (Pentacon, which subsumed Ihagee) is now back in business. This company is not related to the Dutchman Johan Steenbergen, the founder of Ihagee, or with the Exakta, which was discontinued in the 1970s.

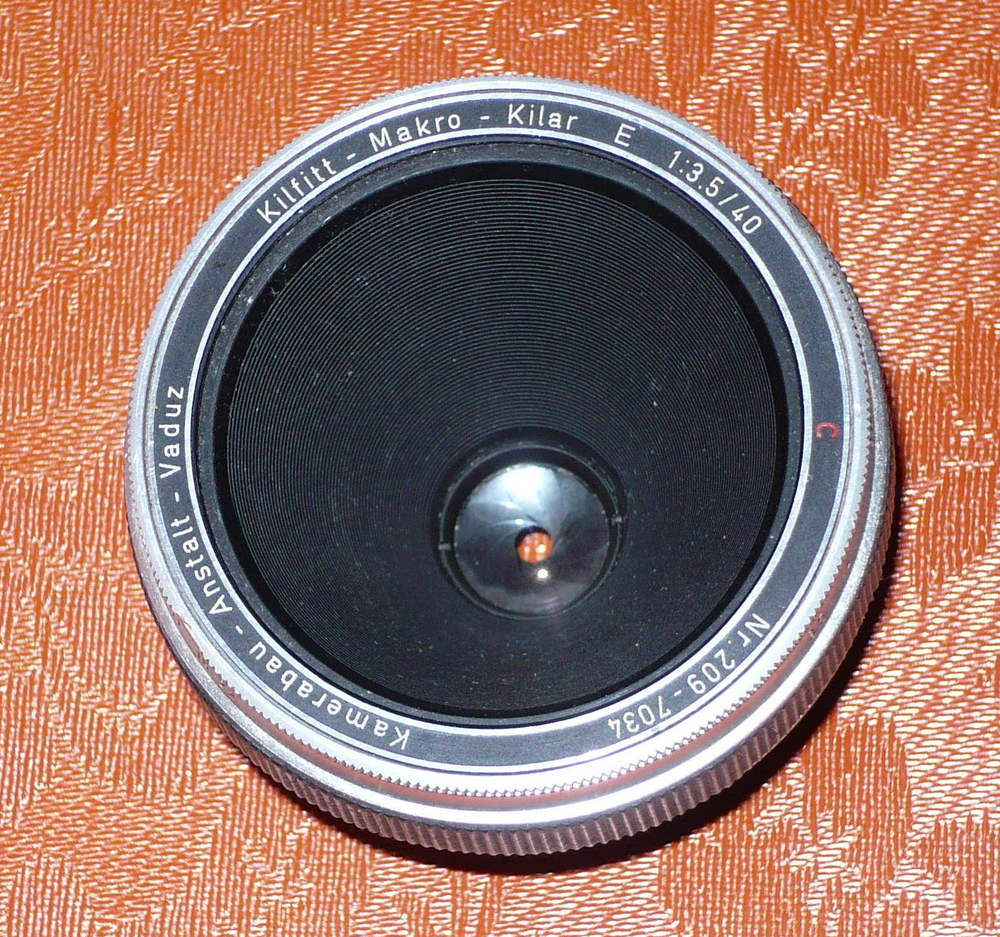
Kilfit macro Kilar 40/3.5, Exakta mount

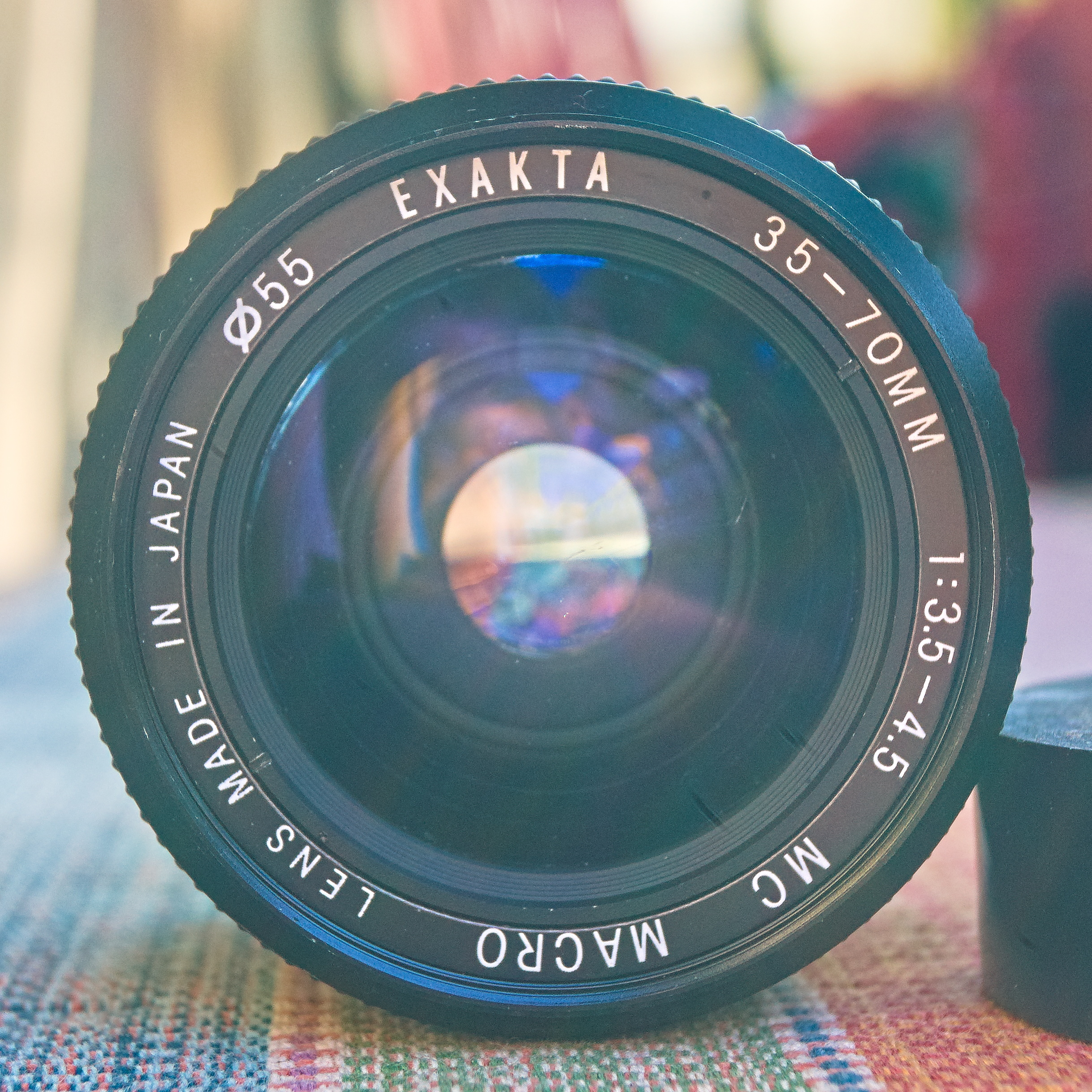
Exaktar 35-70 mm f/3.5-4.5

== See also ==
- History of the single-lens reflex camera
- Ihagee
- Kine Exakta
- Praktica
- Zeiss Ikon
