= Machine control =

Concept in civil engineering

In civil engineering, machine control is used to accurately position earthwork machinery based on 3D design models and GPS systems, and thus aid machine operators to e.g. control the position of a road grader's blade. Many machine control systems utilize the Real Time Kinematic (RTK) system to improve the positioning accuracy.

There are six dominant manufacturers of machine control systems: Makin, iDig, Leica Geosystems, MOBA Mobile Automation AG, Trimble Navigation Limited, Unicontrol and Topcon Positioning Systems. In 2010, the Kellogg Report was published to serve as a resource for comparing the systems from these and other manufacturers.

== See also ==
- GPS in the Earthmoving Industry
