= Kine Exakta =

First 35mm SLR still camera

Kine Exakta (1936–1948)
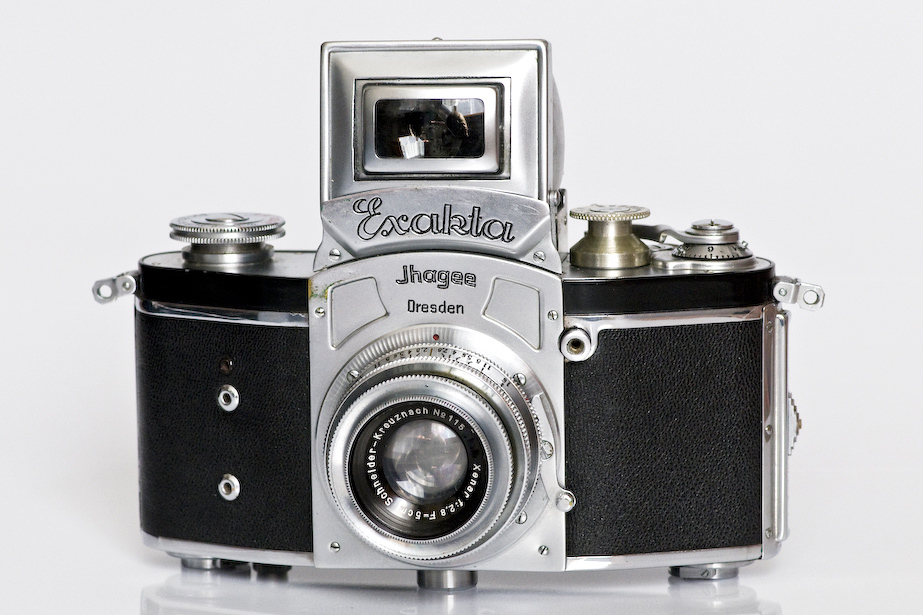

Overview
- Maker: Ihagee
- Type: 35mm SLR camera

Lens
- Lens mount: Exakta bayonet

The Kine Exakta was the first 35mm single-lens reflex (SLR) still camera in regular production. It was presented by Ihagee Kamerawerk Steenbergen GmbH, Dresden at the Leipziger Frühjahrsmesse in March 1936. The Exakta name had already been used by Ihagee on a roll film rangefinder RF camera line since 1933, among these the Vest Pocket Exakta Model B from which the Kine Exakta inherited its general layout and appearance. The word Kine (cine, cinema, movie film) never appeared on the camera itself, only in the instruction manuals and advertising to distinguish it from the roll film variants. Several of its features constituted the foundation for the majority of 35mm SLR cameras produced ever since, although at this stage in a relatively primitive state.

The perforated 35mm film had been used in miniature cameras for more than two decades using the 24x36mm negative format. The single lens reflex principle is even older and was widely used in cameras for the medium format plate- and film material. However, several obstacles had to be overcome to devise a useful miniature SLR camera apart from the fact that the film material itself seriously restricted the usefulness of the negative: It is impossible to determine sharp focus on a ground glass for this format with the naked eye - even with a large aperture lens. To overcome this, Ihagee substituted the traditional ground glass focusing screen with a Plano-convex magnifying glass with the flat side facing downwards and ground to form a focusing screen visible and magnified in the finder. To further improve focusing accuracy, a small magnifying glass could be swung into place for accurate focusing on a small part of the image. Also to improve focusing accuracy fast lenses were needed, and from the start Carl Zeiss Jena provided the Tessar 1:2.8 f=5cm, soon to be followed by the Biotar 1:2 5cm and the Schneider-Kreuznach Xenar 1:2 f=5cm for the Kine Exakta.

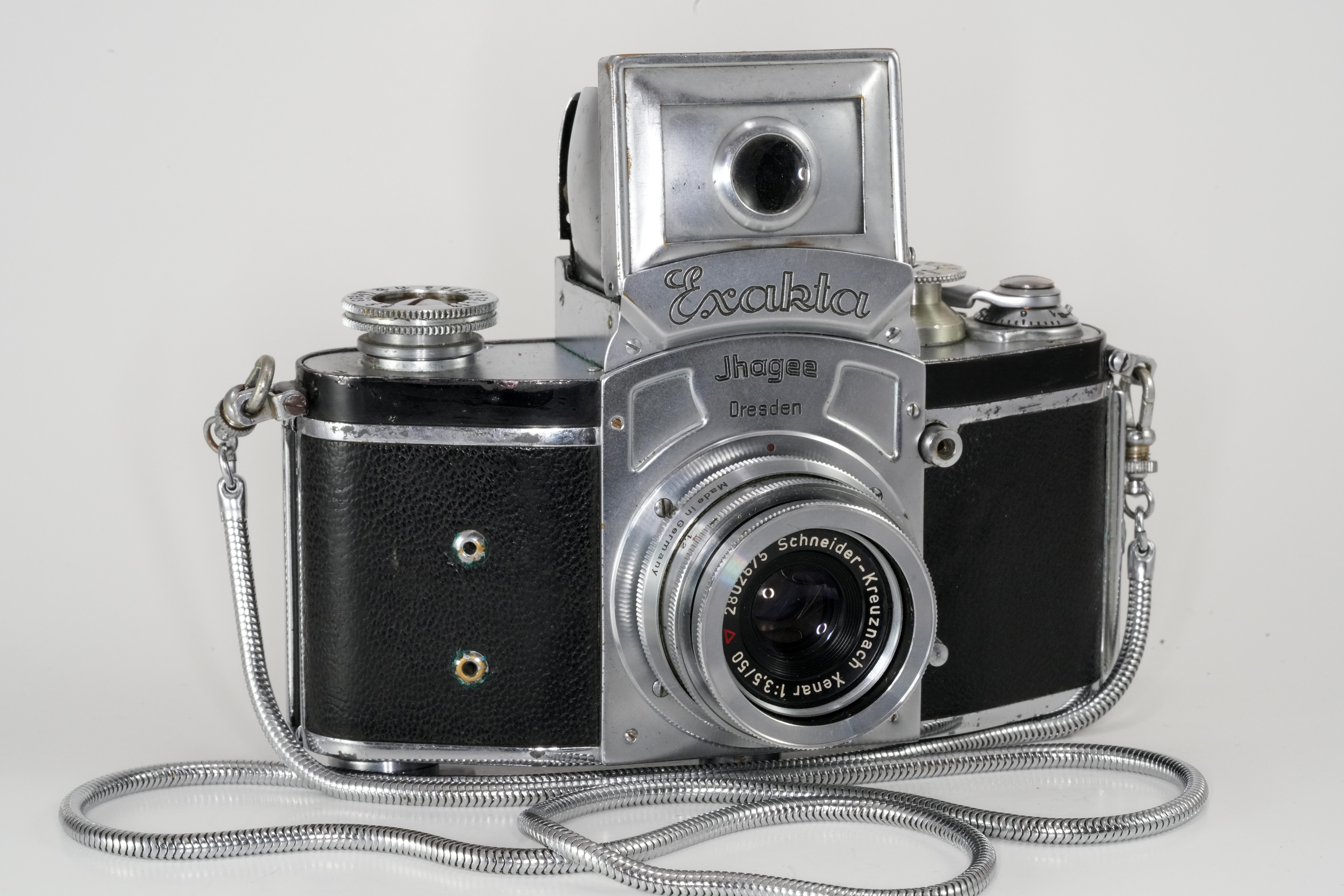
Version 1, round magnifier

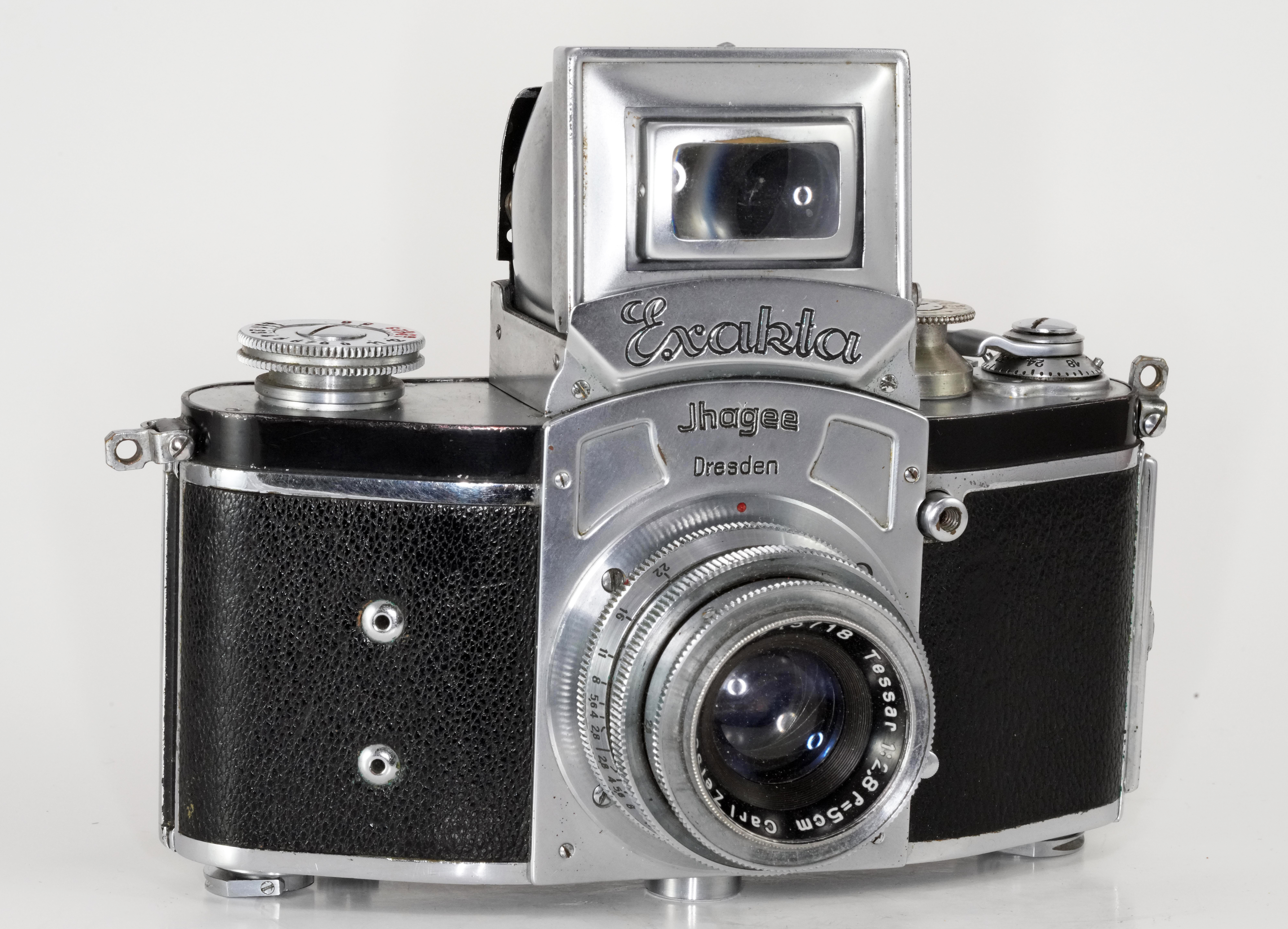
Version 2 and next, rectangular magnifier

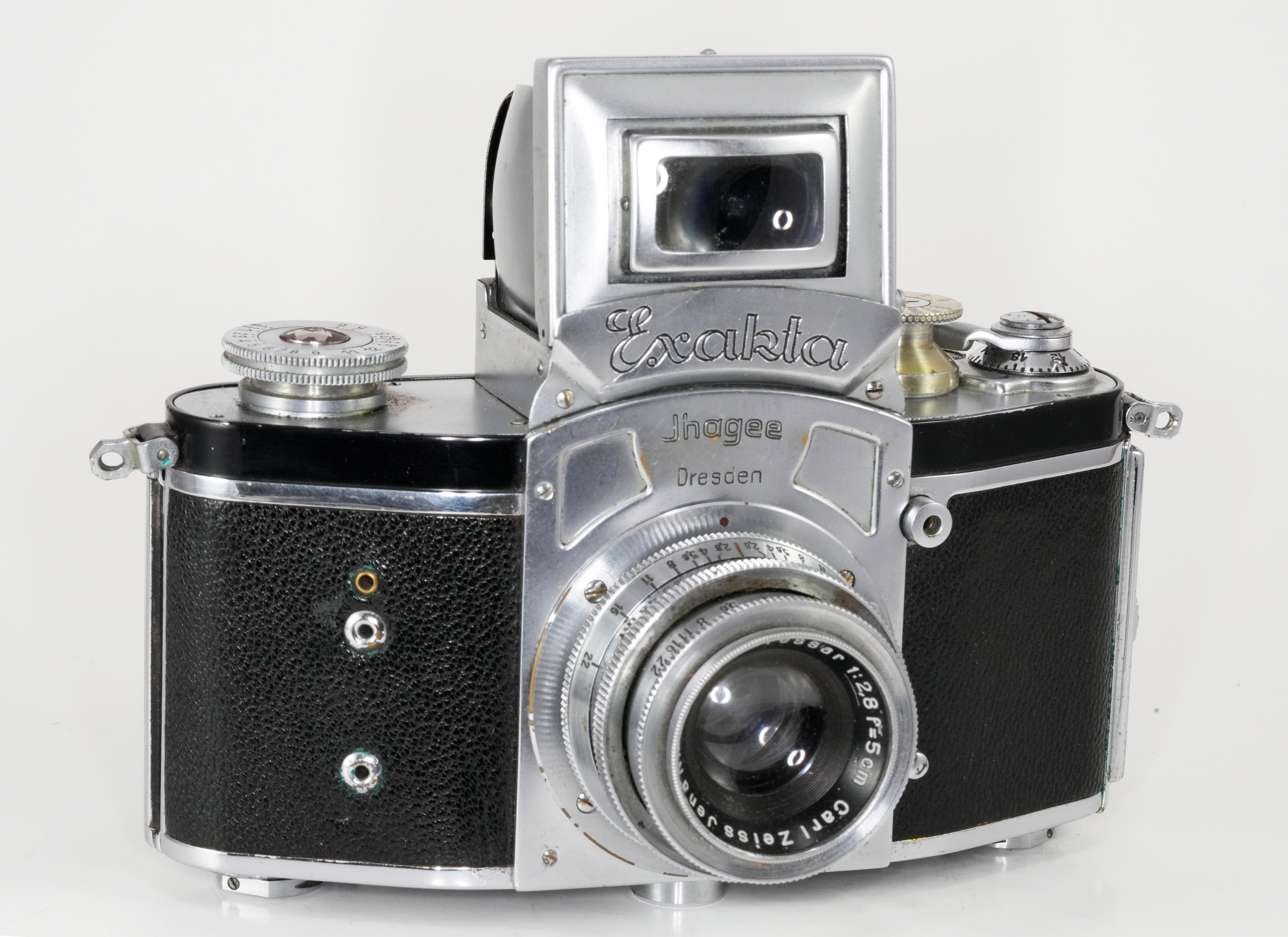
Version 3, third hole added

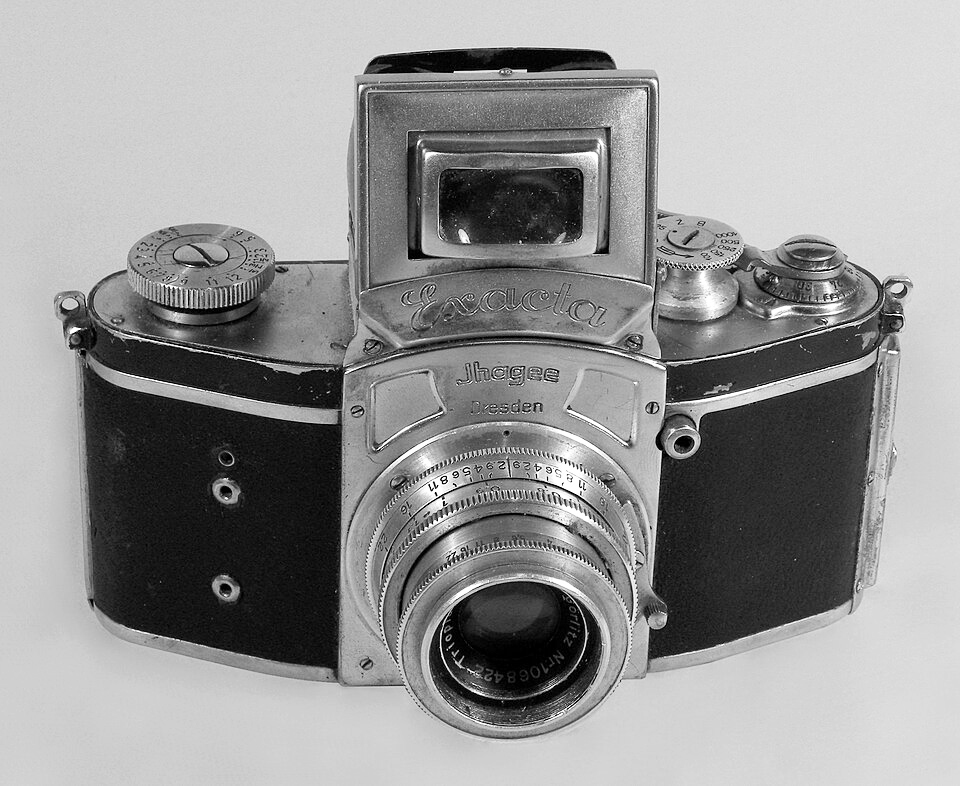
Version 4, after WW2

== Description ==
The Kine Exakta is made of two major aluminium alloy castings, the outer body shell and the internal frame for the mirror box, the shutter mechanism and the film transport. The latter is inserted into the shell from the top and secured by screws. A fixed finder hood and a separate detachable back cover complete the general layout. The Exakta bayonet lens mount was developed for this camera. The shutter is of the horizontal cloth focal plane type providing exposure times from 12 seconds to 1/1000 second with bipolar flash synchronising contacts on the right-hand camera front.

The Kine Exakta controls are somewhat different from those found on most later 35mm SLR film cameras: the finder hood in its collapsed state automatically blocks the shutter release. The film is transported towards the left, leaving the exposed frames the other way round on the filmstrip. The wind-on lever on the left-hand top plate is operated by the left hand thumb and it requires a single 300-degree movement. This advances the film one frame, cocks the shutter, and increments the manual reset frame counter. The lift, turn and set shutter speed dial on the left-hand top plate provides exposure times from 1/25 to 1/1000 second, plus B and Z (time). For double exposures, the shutter may be cocked again by turning the shutter speed dial itself. On the right-hand top plate sits a separately wound dual purpose dial, featuring long time exposure and delayed action shutter release. This works at the shutter setting B and is only settable after the shutter is cocked. Slow speeds are selected by the lift, turn and set procedure against a small index dot. The long exposures times, without delay, are marked in black numerals all the way to 12 seconds, while slow speeds with delayed action are in red numerals to 6 seconds. This is the extent of self-timer release available. All functions are activated by the left-hand front located threaded shutter release button. A film-cutting device is located inside the camera. It enables a partially exposed film to be removed from the camera in daylight for processing provided the left-hand take-up spool was placed in a cassette. A small milled knob at the base is unscrewed and pulled out to cut the film close to the unexposed film cassette.

The primary function of the collapsible finder hood is to shield the focusing screen from outside stray light, but by lowering the hinged magnifying glass into the finder for critical focusing, it also becomes a direct vision frame finder. By looking into the rectangular opening at the back of the hood, it provides the field of view of a 50mm lens, a useful feature since the focusing screen image is laterally reversed, which makes it less useful as an action finder. Pushing a small notch to the side at the lover right on the rear finder hood panel, flips the lowered magnifying glass up and away. The finder panels are stowed away one by one, sides first, and covered by the front lid, which is held down by a hook at the back. The hook is furnished with a release button to erect the hood. A small sector lever close to the shutter dial, with R and V engraved next to it in the top plate, controls the film transportation, R for rewind and V for advance, for rückwärts and vorwärts in German. A knob on the left-hand edge of the body slides downwards to release the back, which is not hinged, only hooked onto the right-hand edge just before closing by a firm pressure on the left-hand back.

== Variants ==
Only a few significant changes were made to the original Kine Exakta (version 1) during its production run until it was replaced by the model II in 1948: Within a few months the circular focusing loupe, visible on top of the collapsed finder hood, was replaced by a rectangular one covering about 50% of the ground glass image (version 2). This version also appeared on the North American market as Exacta, spelled with a c (version 3). About a year later, a threaded hole was added at the right-hand front above the flashbulb synchronising contacts for securing the flashgun to the camera (version 4). After the Second World War production of the Exacta version slowly resumed, but with several minor changes to the camera body. Among these are: the Ihagee logo no longer appears in relief on the rectangular back door leather patch; the carrying strap eyelets on either side of the top edge of the camera are inserted between two small protrusions and riveted in place, and the right-hand shutter dial is milled without a groove along the middle of the edge.

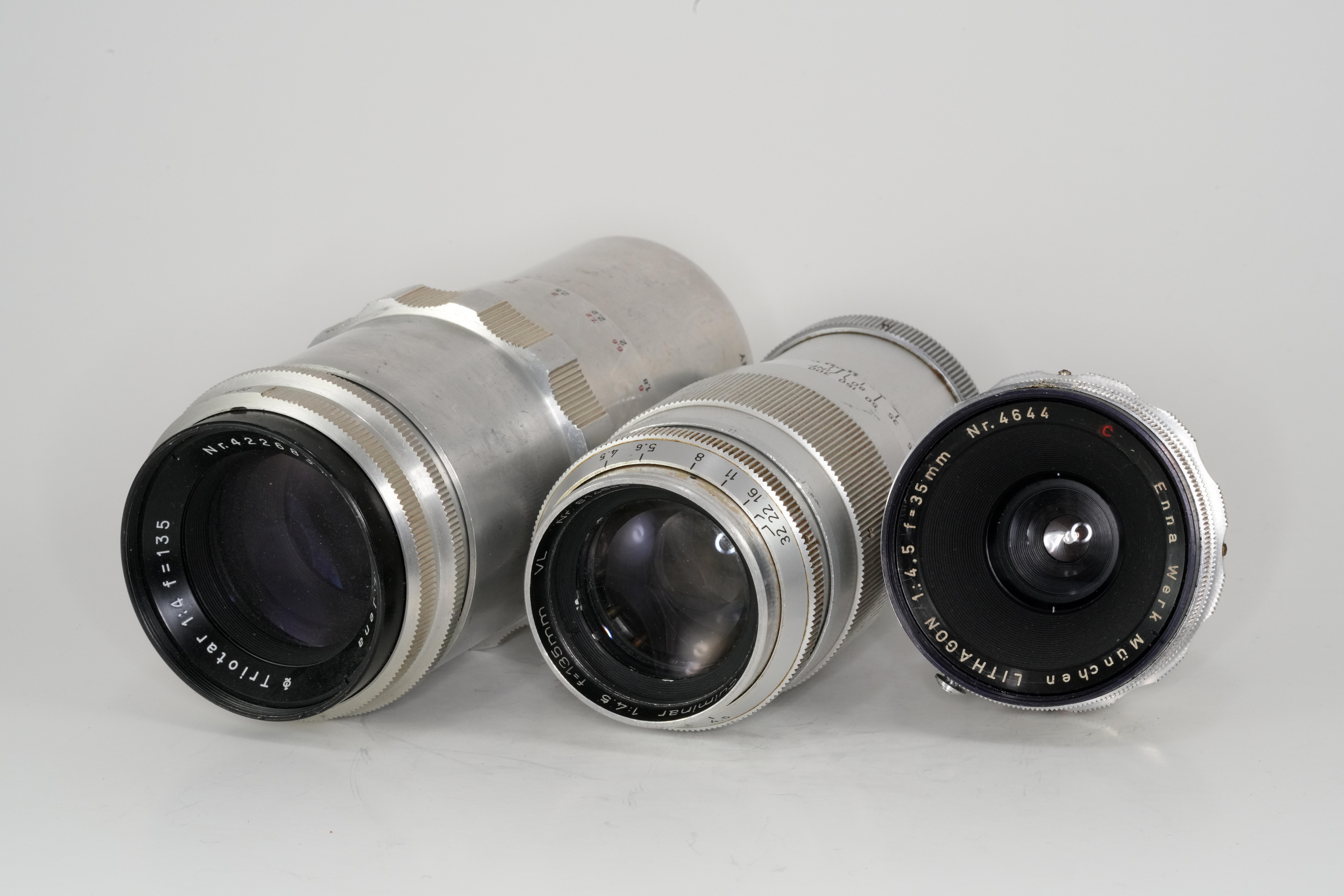
Lenses: C.Z.Jena Triotar 135mm, Steinheil Muenchen Culminar 135mm, Enna Werk Lithagon 35mm

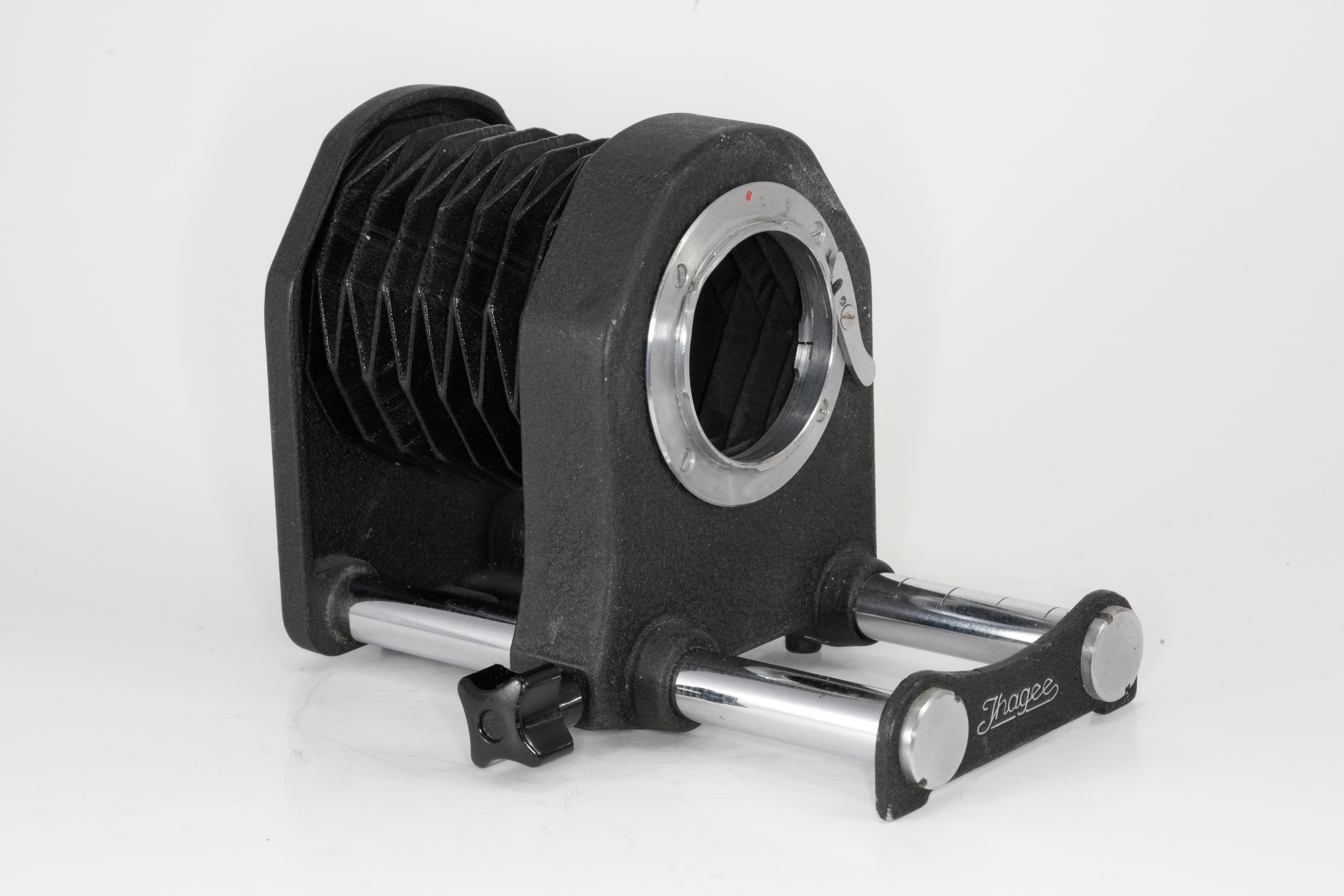
Bellows from Ihagee

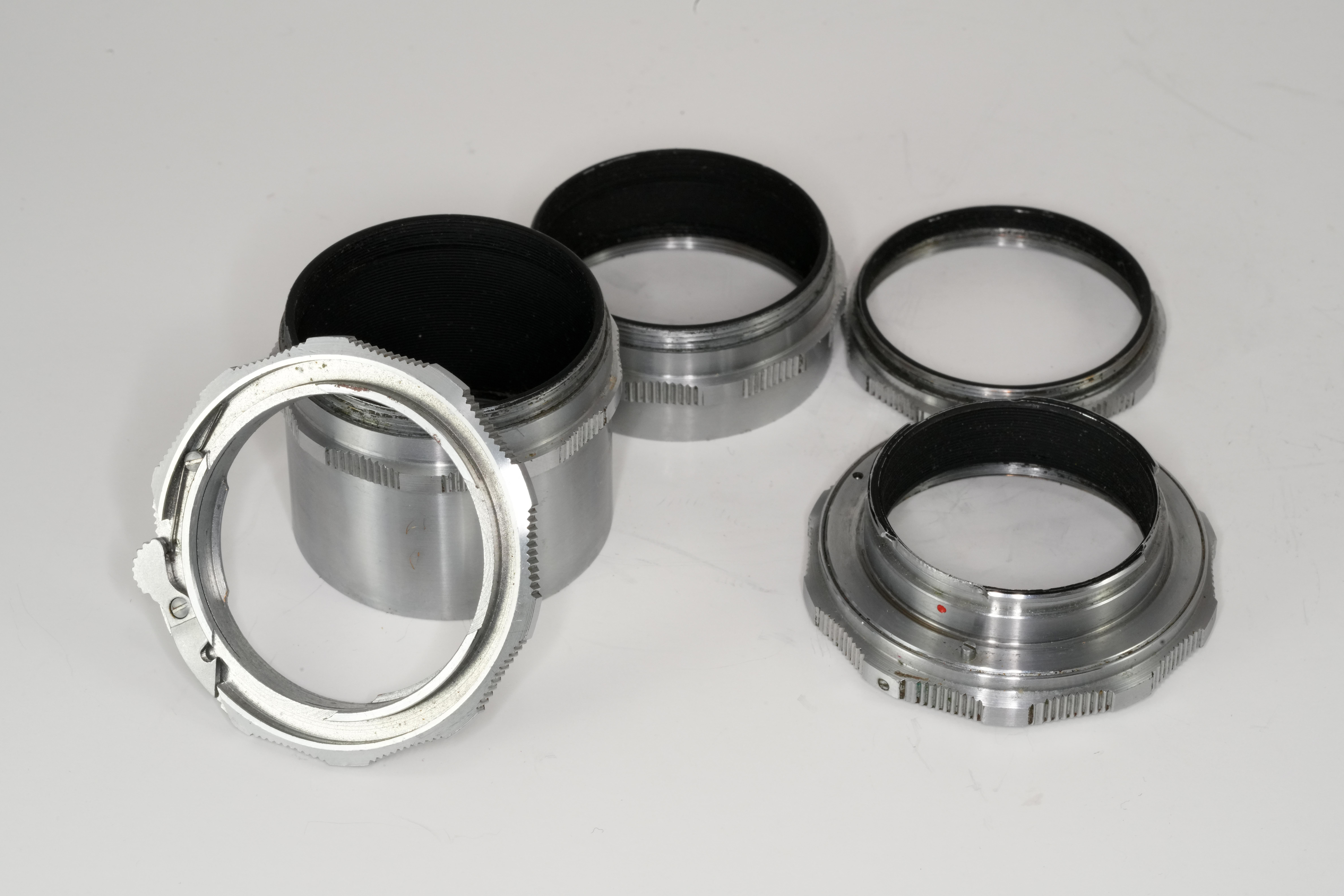
Extension tubes
