= Ihagee =

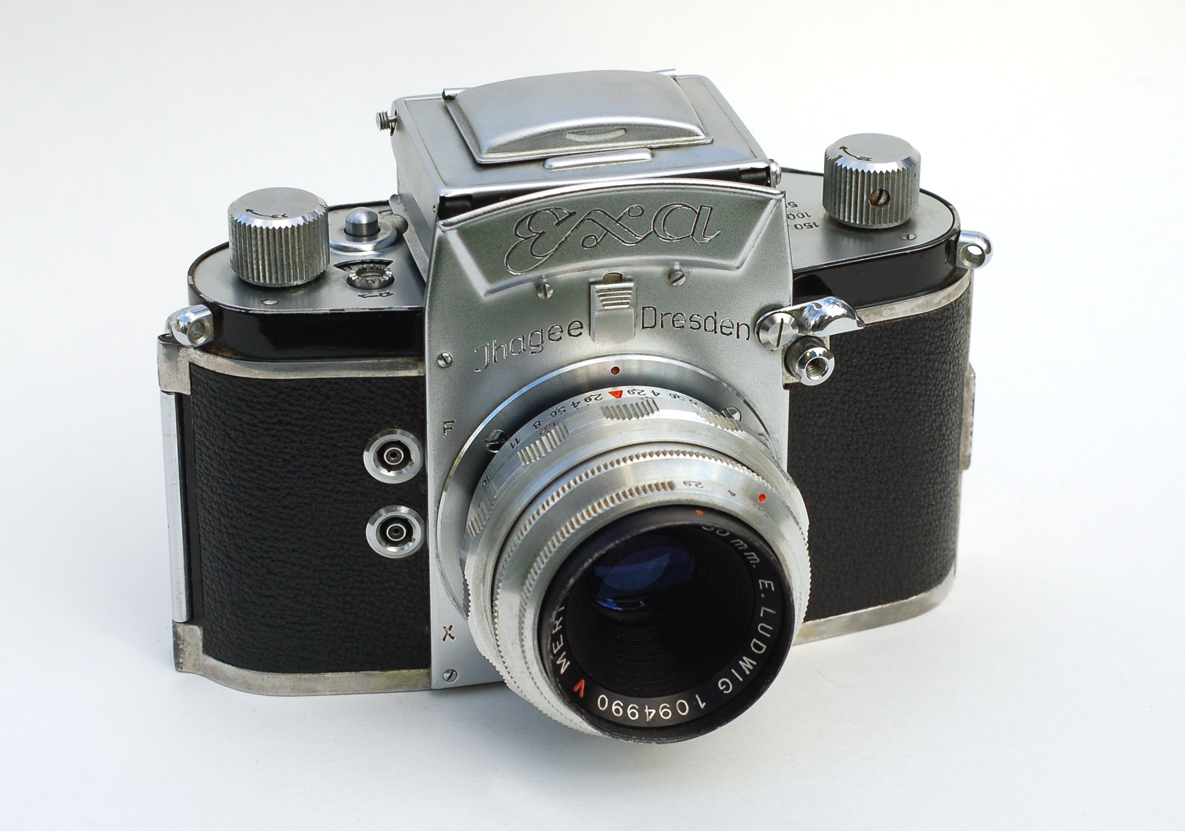
Exa

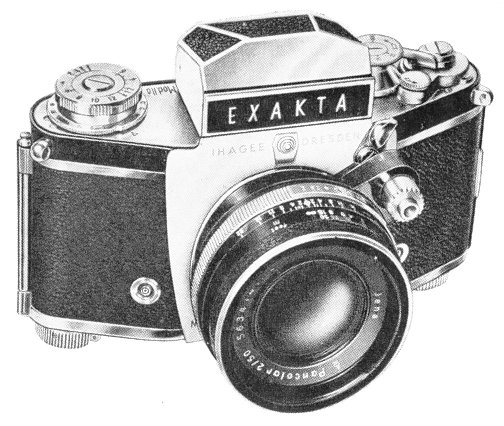
Exakta Varex

Ihagee was a camera manufacturer based in Dresden, Germany. Its best-known product was the Exakta single-lens reflex camera.

== History ==
Johan Steenbergen, a Dutchman, founded a camera company called Industrie- und Handelsgesellschaft in Dresden in 1912. The name was shortened to Ihagee (based on the German pronunciation of the acronym IHG, ee-hah-geh). In 1918, six woodworkers joined Steenbergen at what was known from then on as Ihagee Kamerawerk Steenbergen & Co.

Ihagee's most successful camera by far was the Exakta, which was produced between 1933 and 1976. The series began in 1933 with the Standard, or VP, Exakta, which used 127 rollfilm. This was followed in 1936 by the popular 35mm Kine Exakta. Ihagee also made a smaller, less complex, version of the Exakta called the Exa.

The company was greatly affected by World War II. Steenbergen left Dresden in 1942, never to return, and the Ihagee factory was destroyed during the Allied bombing of Dresden in February 1945. The partitioning of Germany after the war left Dresden and Ihagee in the Soviet occupation zone, later East Germany. The Soviet Union quickly reestablished Ihagee, producing some Exakta and Exa cameras from the parts and machinery that had survived the bombing. The company was taken over by Pentacon, the maker of the successful Praktica camera, in 1951.

Steenbergen returned to West Germany and created a new company in 1959 which was called Ihagee West and had its headquarters in Frankfurt. In 1966 the company marketed its own camera, the Exakta Real, without much success. After Steenbergen's death in 1967, Ihagee West ordered and sold the Exakta TwinTL, which was built by Cosina. The company was dissolved in 1976.

Ihagee in Dresden was very successful in the development and sales of the Exakta SLR. In 1970, however, the company was completely absorbed by Pentacon and camera production under the Ihagee nameplate ceased. The last Exakta model, the RTL 1000, was a cooperative effort with Pentacon. It is possible that the Ihagee company still exists on paper.

Since 1997, the Steenbergen Foundation (Steenbergen Stichting) in The Hague has commemorated Johan Steenbergen by awarding the Steenbergen Stipendium to a graduate of one of the Dutch photo academies, and to a university graduate, supporting a study of a historical aspect of the Dutch province of Drenthe, birthplace of Steenbergen.
