= Charles Beseler Company =

American industrial company

Charles Beseler Company is a Stroudsburg, Pennsylvania industrial company addressing four primary markets: public and corporate steel shelving and furniture, iron shelving and storage, shrink wrap packaging and silver halide photography (film photography). The company now has two divisions left, its photo division and shrink wrap packaging.

The company is a historic contributor to silver halide photography. The company still sells photographic enlargers; one of the few remaining companies to market the device.

== History ==
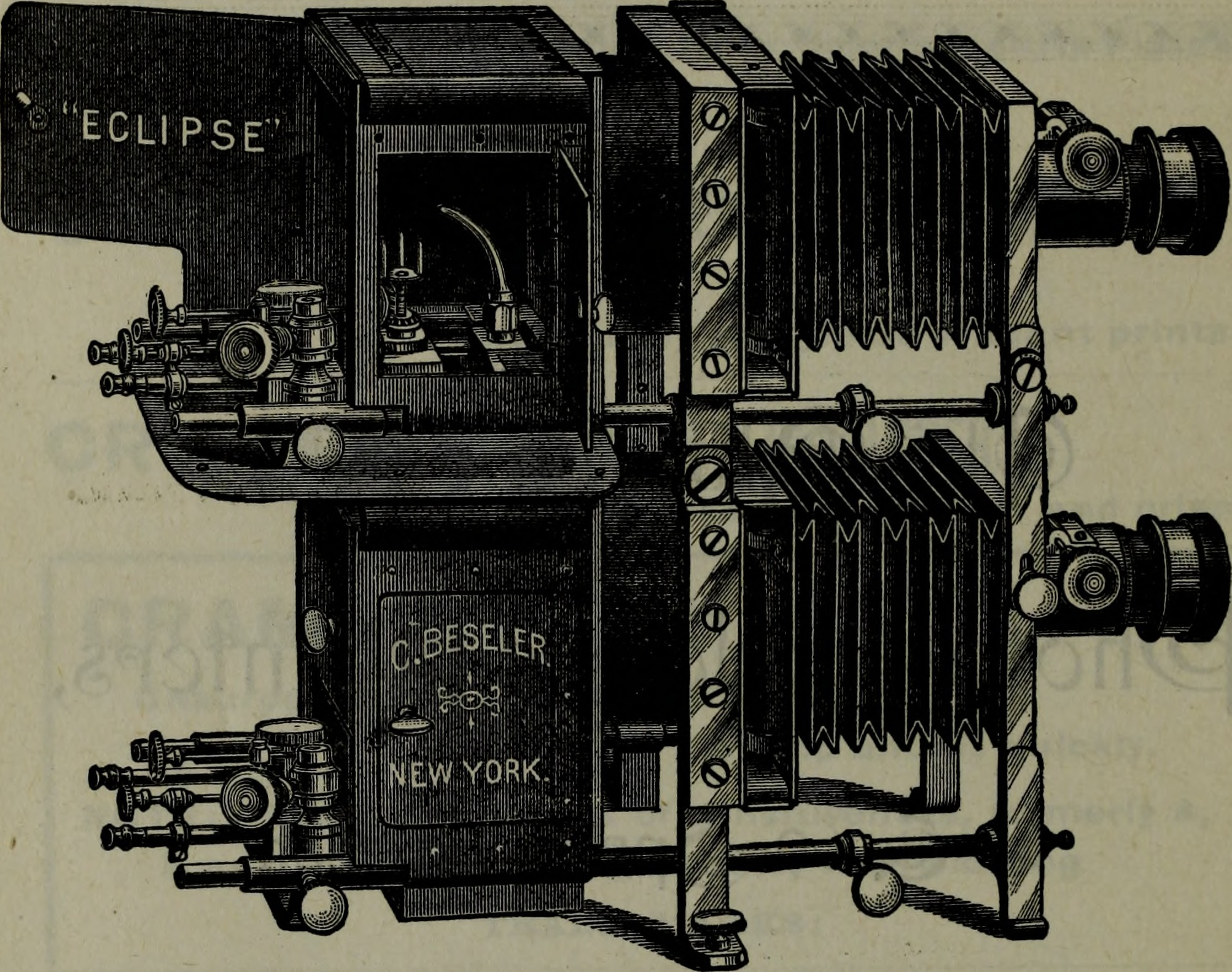
C. BESELER The Eclipse Stereopticon (1892)

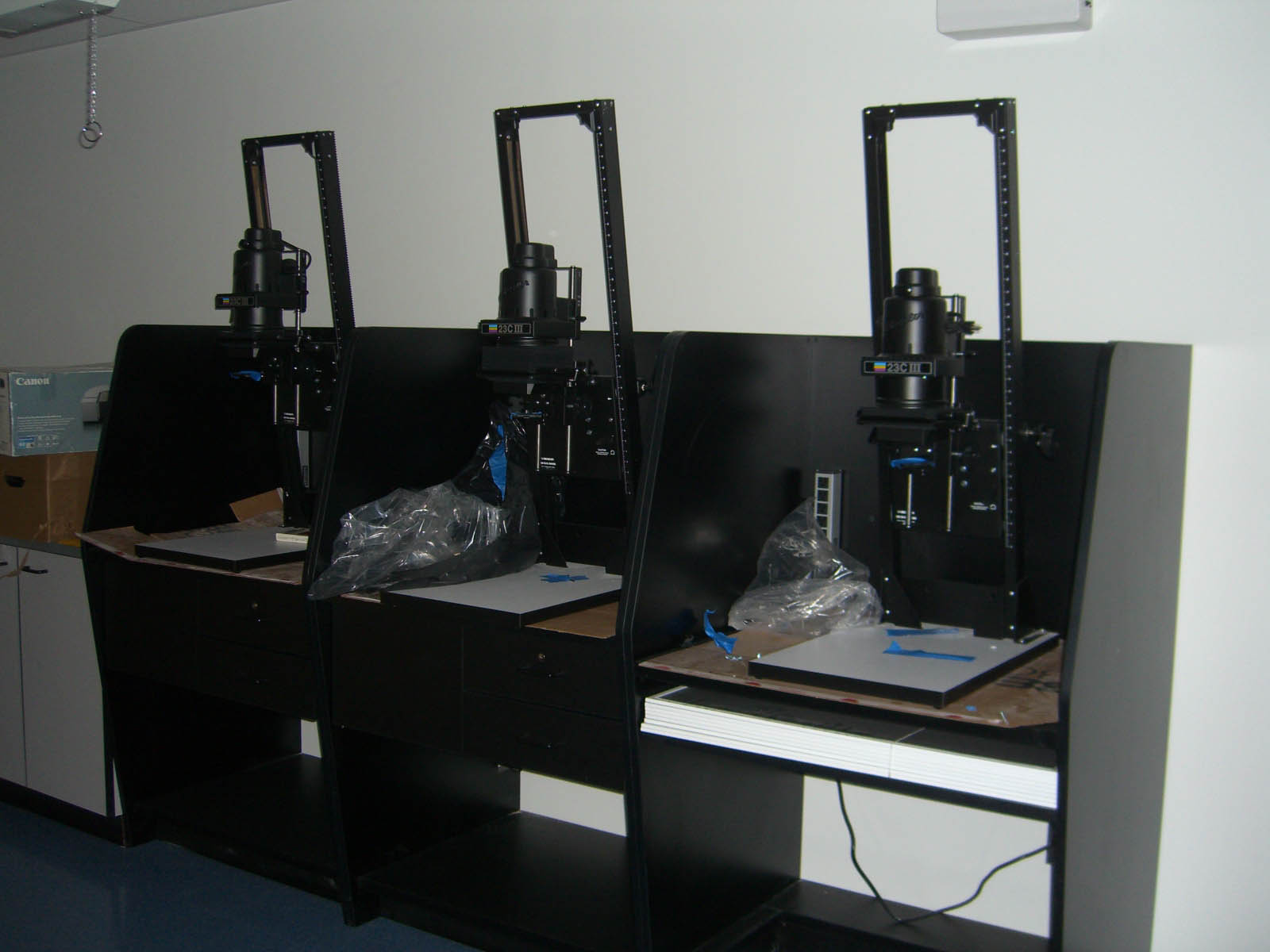
Beseler 23C III enlargers

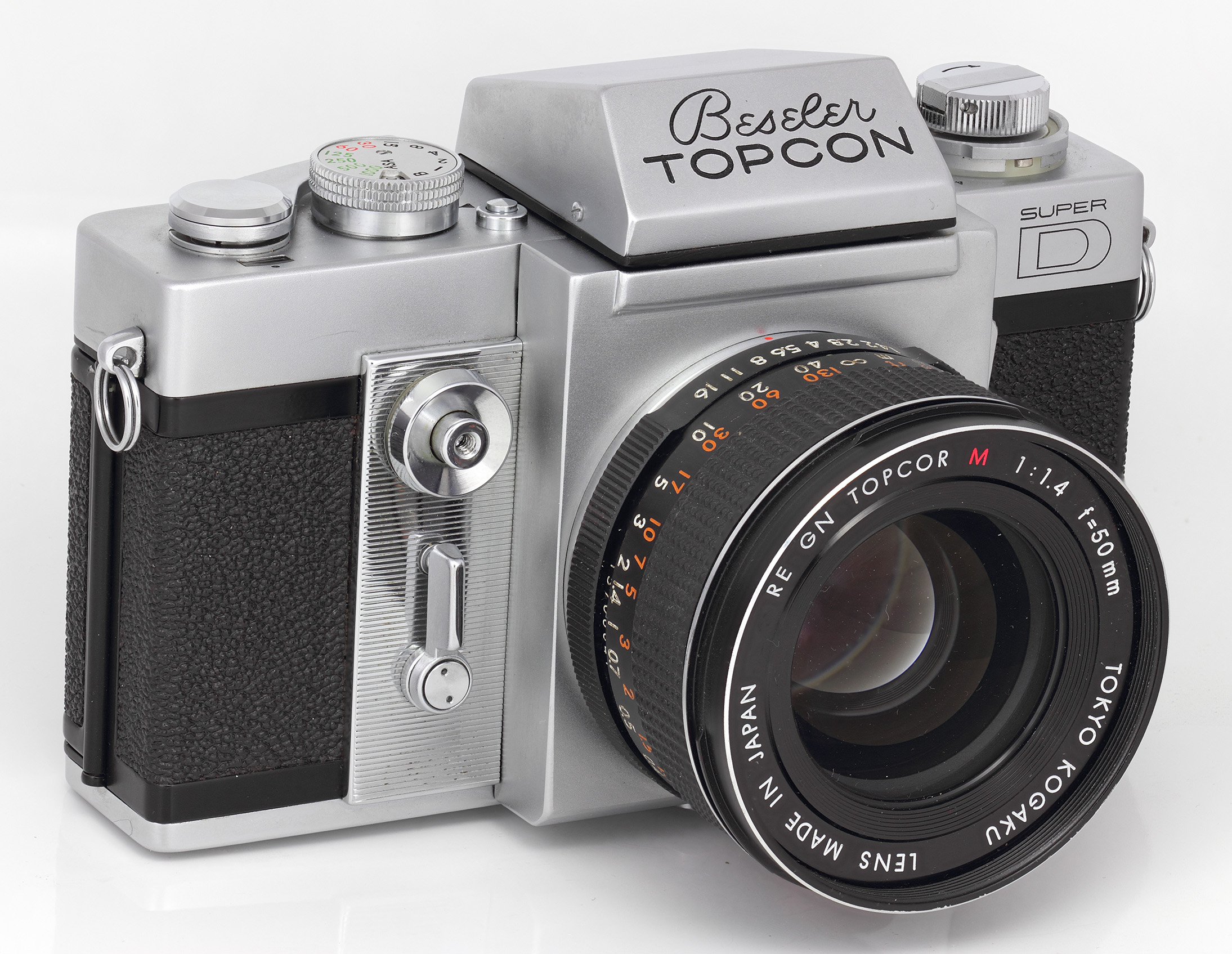
Beseler Topcon Super D (1963)

The name Charles Beseler Company comes from Charles Beseler, a businessman in Germany in the 19th century who sold magic lanterns and stereopticons.

Beseler died in 1909, but his company remained and then moved to New Jersey in 1919. The company manufactured photographic enlargers and other photographic equipment throughout the 20th century. It also imported the Topcon line of cameras into the US during the time that the company made cameras.

Following a three-way merger in 1987, the company introduced other industrial lines to its business, and assumed new ownership.

Around 2004, the president died and ownership passed to his wife, with the previous CEO taking on the role of president.

== Role in education ==
From as early as the 1990s and as of the 2000s, the Charles Beseler Company was a supplier to high schools for photography classes in Minnesota and Ontario.
