= Topcon =

Japanese manufacturer of optical equipment

Topcon Corporation
- Native name: 株式会社トプコン
- Type: Private
- Traded as: TYO: 7732
- Industry: Electronics
- Founded: Tokyo (September 1932; 94 years ago)
- Headquarters: 75-1, Hasunuma-cho, Itabashi-ku, Tokyo 174-8580, Japan
- Key people: Takashi Eto (President and CEO)
- Products: Measuring equipment; Medical equipment
- Revenue: ▲US$ 1.471 billion (FY 2022) (JPY 215.625 billion) (FY 2022) (2022)
- Net income: ▲US$101.13 million (JPY 14.82 billion) (2022)
- Number of employees: 5543 (2023)
- Subsidiaries: Sokkia
- Website: Official website

Topcon Corporation (株式会社トプコン, Kabushiki-gaisha Topukon) is a Japanese manufacturer of optical equipment for ophthalmology and surveying.

== History ==
=== 1930s ===
TOPCON was established in September 1932 by the merger of the surveying instruments division of K. Hattori & Co., Ltd. (now known as Seiko Holdinge Corporation) to manufacture the optical instruments for the Japanese Army. Initially, the company produced surveying instruments, binoculars, and cameras, as well as sniper scopes used mainly by the Army.

In April 1933, TOPCON built its head offices and main factory at 180, Shimura-motohasunuma-cho, Itabashi-ku, Tokyo.

=== 1940s ===
In August 1945, TOPCON temporarily closed its factories after the end of World War II, but soon gained the authorization from the Tokyo Governor to convert the factory for production of civil products. By the end of the year, the factory reopened to manufacture binoculars and surveying instruments. They established Yamagata Kikai Kyogo Kabushikikaisha (currently Topcon Yamagata Co., Ltd.) in 1946, in Yamagata-shi, Yamagata Prefecture.

In December 1947, TOPCON started selling lens meters and an Ophthalmic and Medical Instruments business. In May of 1949, it listed its stock on Tokyo and Osaka Stock Exchanges.

=== 1950s–1990s ===
- 1957 — released its first single-lens reflex camera, the Topcon R, with semi-auto lens and an interchangeable finder.
- March 1960 — Became an affiliate of Tokyo Shibaura Electric Co., Ltd. (currently Toshiba Corporation).
- May 1963 — Released the first single-lens reflex camera with through-the-lens metering (TTL), the TOPCON RE Super.
- October 1969 — Established Tokyo Kogaku Seiki Kabushikikaisha (currently OPTONEXUS Co., Ltd.) in Tamura-gun, Fukushima Prefecture.
- April 1970 — Established Topcon Europe N.V. (currently Topcon Europe B.V.) in Rotterdam, The Netherlands.
- September 1970 — Established Topcon Instrument Corporation of America (currently Topcon Medical Systems, Inc.).
- January 1975 — Established Topcon Sokki Co., Ltd. (currently Topcon Sales corporation), a surveying instrument sales company.
- December 1976 — Established Topcon Medical Japan Co., Ltd., a medical instrument sales company.
- April 1978 — Started selling an electric distance meter DM-C1 adopting a near-infrared.
- October 1978 — Started selling a refractometer RM-100 incorporating near-infrared beam and a television system.
- March 1979 — Established Topcon Singapore Pte. Ltd. in Singapore.
- 1986 — Established Topcon Optical (H.K.) Ltd. in Hong Kong in April; listed on First Sections of Tokyo and Osaka Stock Exchanges in September.
- April 1989 — Changed its corporate name to TOPCON CORPORATION.
- April 1991 — Entry into electron beam business.
- December 1991 — Built an engineering center in corporate premises.
- September 1994 — Established Topcon Laser Systems, Inc. (currently Topcon Positioning Systems, Inc.) in California, U.S.A., acquired Advanced Grade Technology, advanced into machine control business.
- October 1994 — Delivered a nationwide GPS continuous observation system to Geographical Survey Institute, Ministry of Construction, Japanese Government.

=== 2000s onward ===
- July 2000 — Acquired Javad Positioning Systems Inc. in the United States and started selling precision GPS receivers and related system products.
- July 2001 — Established Topcon America Corporation in New Jersey, U.S.A. as a holding company. Reorganized the subsidiaries in the United States, dividing them into the ophthalmic and medical instrument business and the positioning business.
- July 2002 — Liquidated Topcon Singapore Pte. Ltd. and established Topcon South Asia Pte. Ltd. in Singapore.
- February 2004 — Established Topcon (Beijing) Opto-Electronics Corporation in Beijing, China.
- July 2005 — Reorganized sales subsidiaries in Europe and established two firms in the European market – one overseeing eye care business, and the other overseeing positioning business – with Topcon Europe B.V. as the holding company.
- July 2005 — Transferred from part of the Hoya Corporation Vision Care Company's ophthalmic instruments segment in Japan.
- April 2006 — Implemented two-for-one stock split.
- August 2006 — Acquired ANKA Systems, Inc., in the United States for full-fledged entry into the ophthalmic network business in the United States.
- October 2006 — Acquired KEE Technologies Pty Ltd., in Australia for entry into the field of agriculture.
- April 2007 — Topcon adopted three business structures, Positioning Business Unit, Eye Care Business Unit and Finetech Business Unit, for quick business expansion into a global group.
- May 2007 — Business rights for mobile control (navigation systems, ITS and others) transferred to U.S. subsidiary from Javad Navigation Systems, Inc.
- February 2008 — Conducted a takeover bid for shares of Sokkia Co., Ltd. and made it a subsidiary to enhance competitiveness of the positioning business in the global market.
- July 2008 — Established TIERRA SPA in Turin (Italy), a joint venture with Divitech spa entering in the Telematic and Remote Diagnostic market segments.
- June 2009 — Acquired shares of Italian wireless communications manufacturer DESTURA s.r.l. to strengthen operations in mobile communications, machine controls, and agricultural IT market segments.
- October 2009 — Established Topcon 3D Inspection Laboratories, Inc., a 3D inspection technology development/design company, in Canada. Entry into the 3D measurement and high-end print board fields.
- March 2010 — Acquired InlandGEO Holding S.L., the largest dealer in Spain, to enhance sales channels for precision agricultural systems in the European, Middle-Eastern, and African markets.
- July 2010 — Expanded Chinese subsidiary and established Topcon (Beijing) Opto-Electronics Development Corporation as a manufacturing base in the Chinese market.
- July 2010 — Reorganized sales subsidiary in Singapore, established Topcon Singapore Holdings Pte. Ltd. as a holding company. Established new Positioning and Eye Care sales companies.
- August 2010 — Established Topcon Medical Laser Systems, Inc. by acquiring retina and glaucoma business of OptiMedica (U.S.A) and entered therapeutic laser market.
- January 2011 — Established Topcon Positioning Middle East and Africa FZE to expand Positioning Business in Middle Eastern and African market.
- November 2014 — Acquired Wachendorff Elektronik GmbH and Wachendorff Electronics Inc.
- September 2015 — Toshiba sold its shares of Topcon.
- April 2018 — Established Topcon Healthcare Solutions, Inc. a medical software company based in Oakland, New Jersey. Their primary focus is the eye-care industry.
- July 2021 — Topcon Corporation acquired VISIA Imaging S.r.l, an ophthalmic device manufacturer headquartered in suburban Florence, Italy.
- March 2025 — Topcon agreed to be taken private through a management buyout led by KKR & Co., which acquired a majority stake for approximately ¥256 billion (US$1.7 billion) alongside investments from Japan Investment Corporation and Topcon's management, valuing the company at ¥348 billion (US$2.3 billion) and resulting in its delisting from the Tokyo Stock Exchange in December.

== Cameras ==
Tokyo Kogaku produced cameras, beginning with a 6×4.5 cm medium format model, Lord in 1937. A 127 film camera followed the next year. The Primoflex I twin-lens reflex camera came out in 1951. The Topcon 35A was unveiled in 1953. In 1960, the company produced a 6x9 press camera on order from the Tokyo Metropolitan Police Department. It initially used a Mamiya lens; civilian models became available with Topcon lenses.

=== 35mm SLR cameras ===
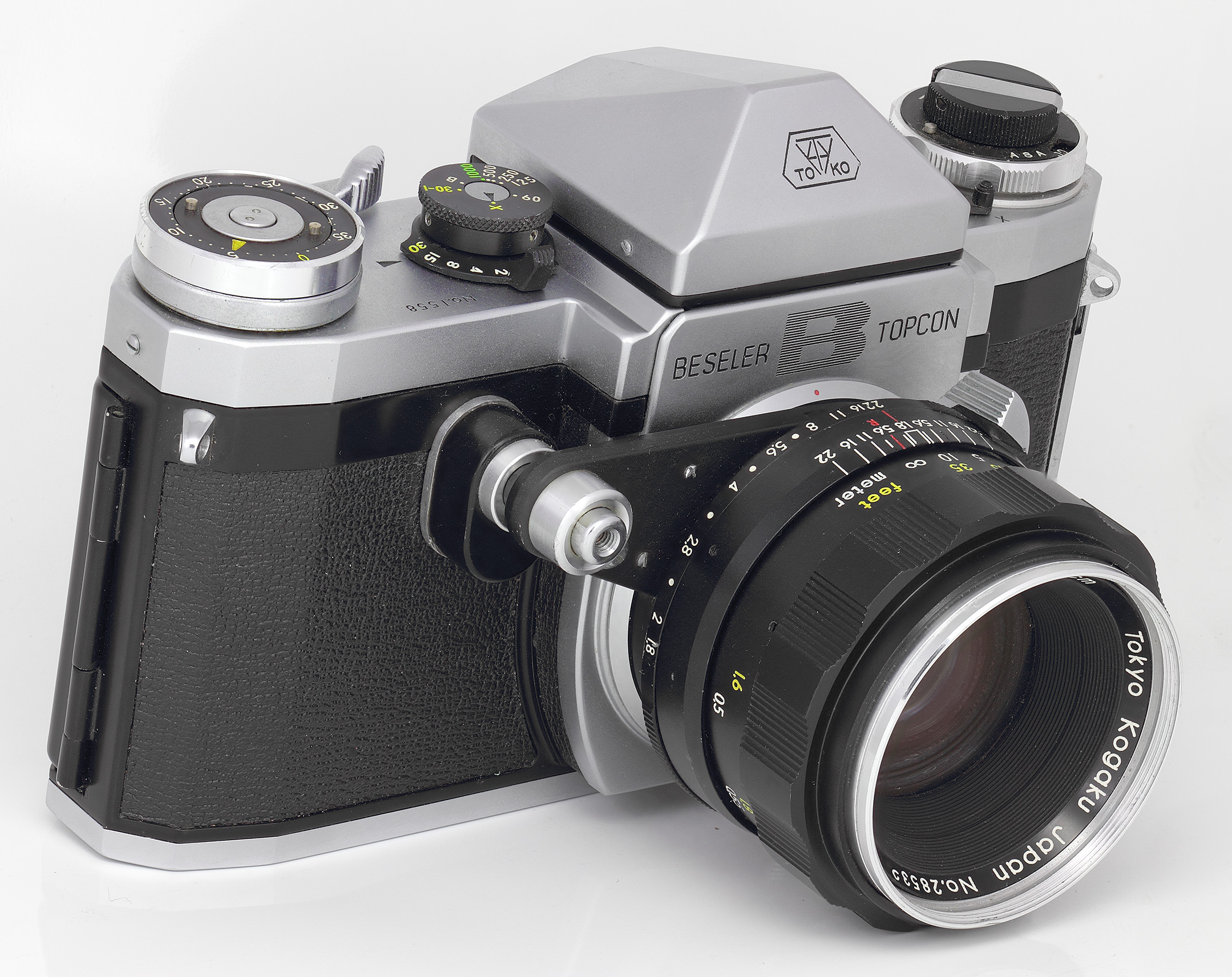
Beseler Topcon B, aka Topcon R, with early Auto-Topcor semi-automatic lens

The third 35mm SLR camera released in Japan was Tokyo Kogaku's Topcon R (1957), which features a "semi-automatic" aperture: the photographer composes the image, selects an aperture, presses a lever to charge a spring, and then presses the shutter release, which also releases the spring to stop down the aperture to the selection as the focal-plane shutter is opened. Because of this arrangement, the Auto-Topcor lenses have a triangular protrusion which overlaps the shutter release mounted on the front of the camera body.

Topcon cameras put the shutter release under the photographer's right index finger, making the Topcor lenses incompatible with Exakta cameras, despite sharing the same mechanical bayonet mount. In the United States, the Charles Beseler Company sold the Topcon R as the Beseler Topcon B. Compared to its contemporary competitors, the Topcon R used a quick-return mirror, which allowed the photographer to recompose immediately after taking a picture, although this advantage was mostly lost as the lens remained stopped down, only returning to full aperture when the presetting lever was charged.

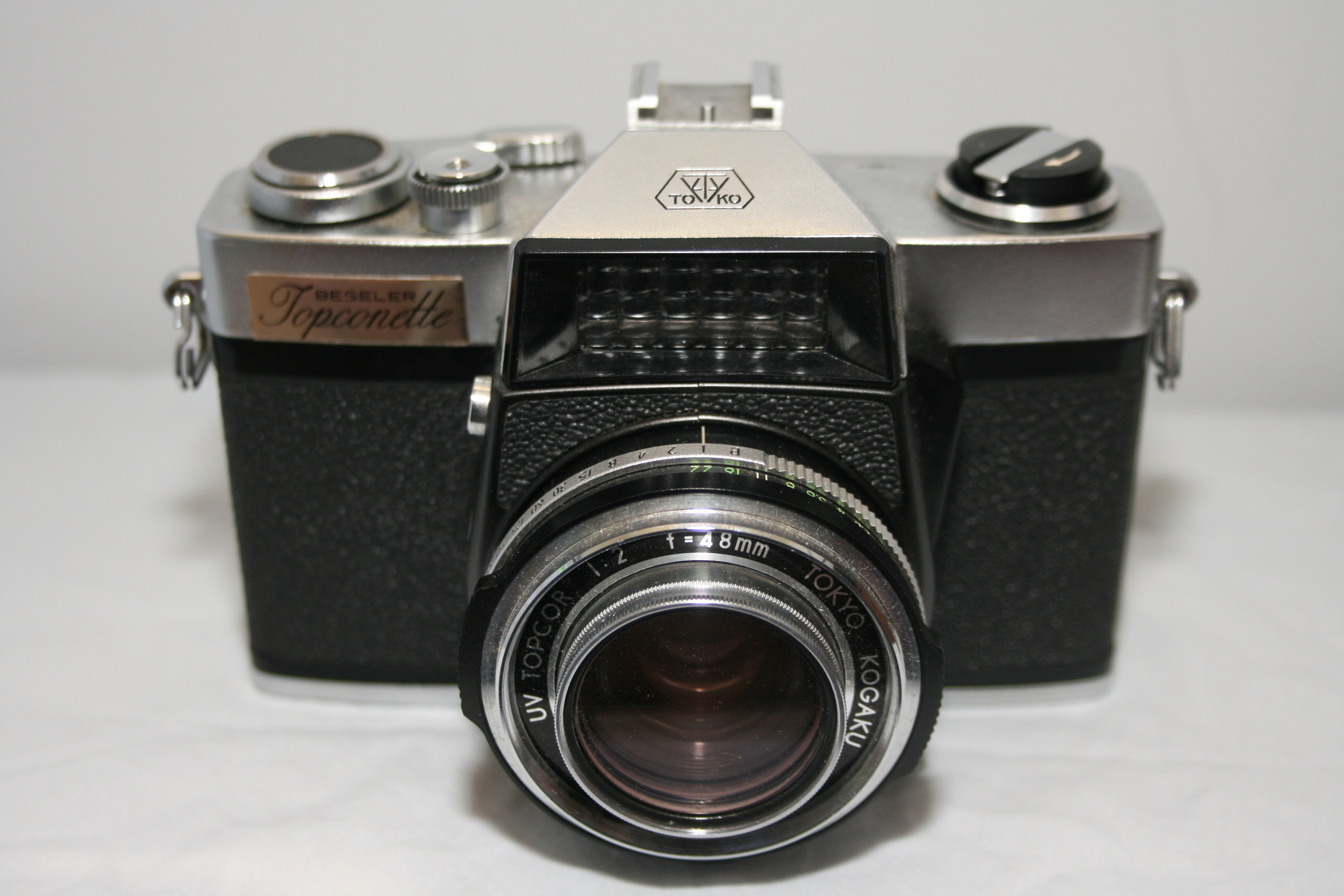
Beseler Topconette aka Wink Mirror E, with fixed UV Topcor lens

Tokyo Kogaku introduced the Topcon PR in 1959, which was the start of a lower-priced in-lens leaf shutter SLR line with a fixed Tessar-derived 50 mm f/2.8 lens; shutter speeds range from 1 to 1/500 sec. Two front-mounted converter lenses were available, with a composite system focal lengths of 37 mm f/4 and 94 mm f/4. It was succeeded by the PR II (1960), which had mostly minor cosmetic changes but added automatic diaphragm operation, and was accompanied by a third conversion lens with a focal length of 85 mm.

Beseler imported this camera into the US as the Beseler Topcon A (although not marked as such), and it also was sold by DeJUR as the Dekon-SR. Later that year, the Topcon Wink Mirror was released, which incorporated a faster double Gauss lens, although still fixed, and a quick-return mirror. A new set of converter lenses were made available, for 35 mm f/4 and 80 mm f/4. Also in 1960, Tokyo Kogaku released the Topcon R II or Automatic Topcon R, which added an automatic diaphragm function to the focal plane SLR line; Beseler sold this as the Beseler Topcon C.

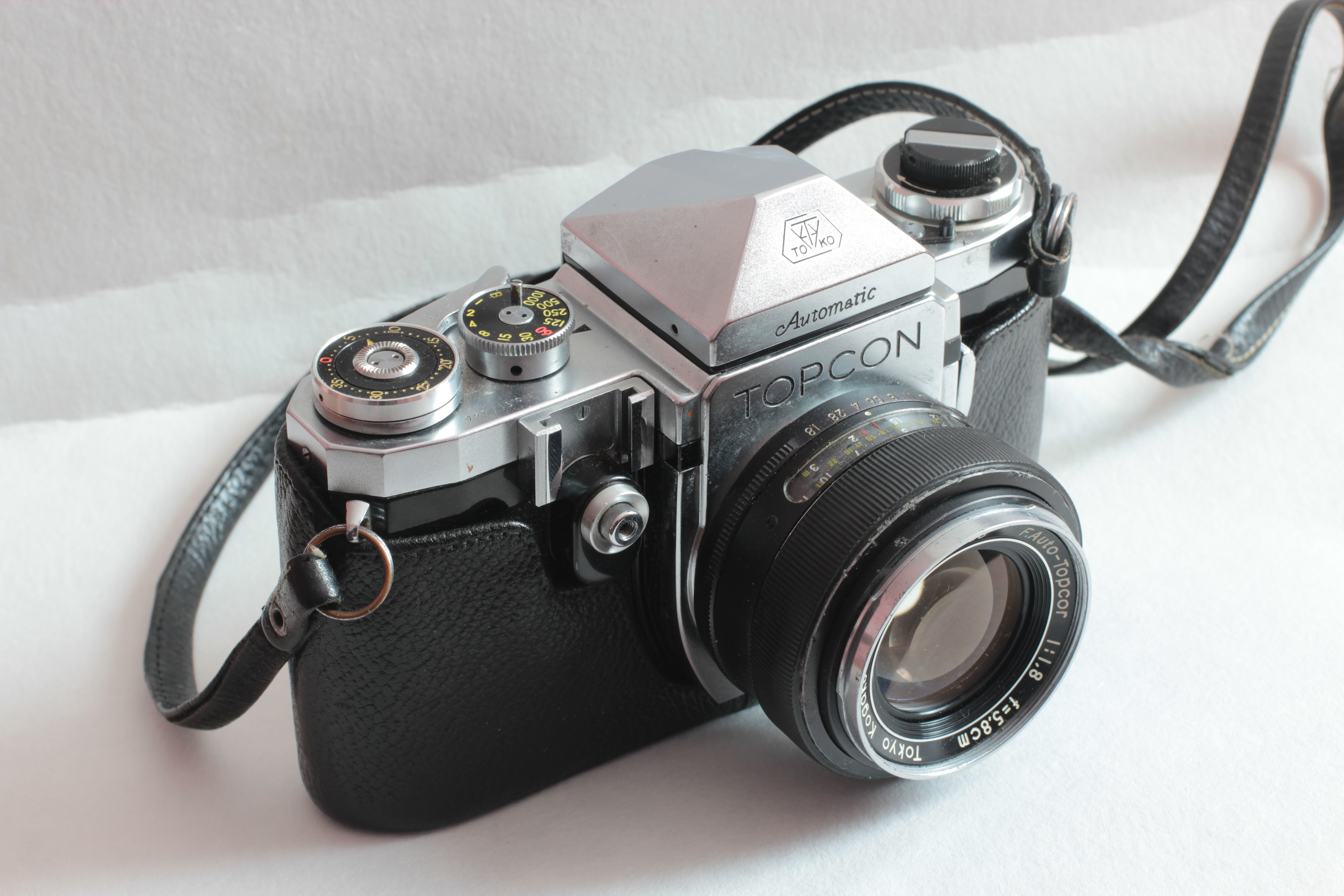
Topcon R III with updated F.Auto-Topcor lens

The Wink Mirror E followed in 1961, which added a selenium photocell light meter to the front of the Wink, but was otherwise unchanged; the lens incorporated a material that acts as an UV filter, and so was renamed UV Topcor. The Wink Mirror E was similarly imported into the United States as the Beseler Topconette. In addition, the Topcon R III was introduced in 1961, partly in response to the Nikon F and Canon Canonflex (both 1959), although it was little changed compared with the R II: the most prominent difference is the presence of a front-mounted cold shoe just above the shutter release on the R III for a shutter speed-linked selenium meter. The R II was accompanied by a line of F.Auto-Topcor lenses, which dropped the triangular projection and used black-finished aluminum barrels. The focal plane Topcon R SLRs soon were followed by the short-lived Topcon RS (1962), which traded the selenium meter for one with a CdS photoresistor.

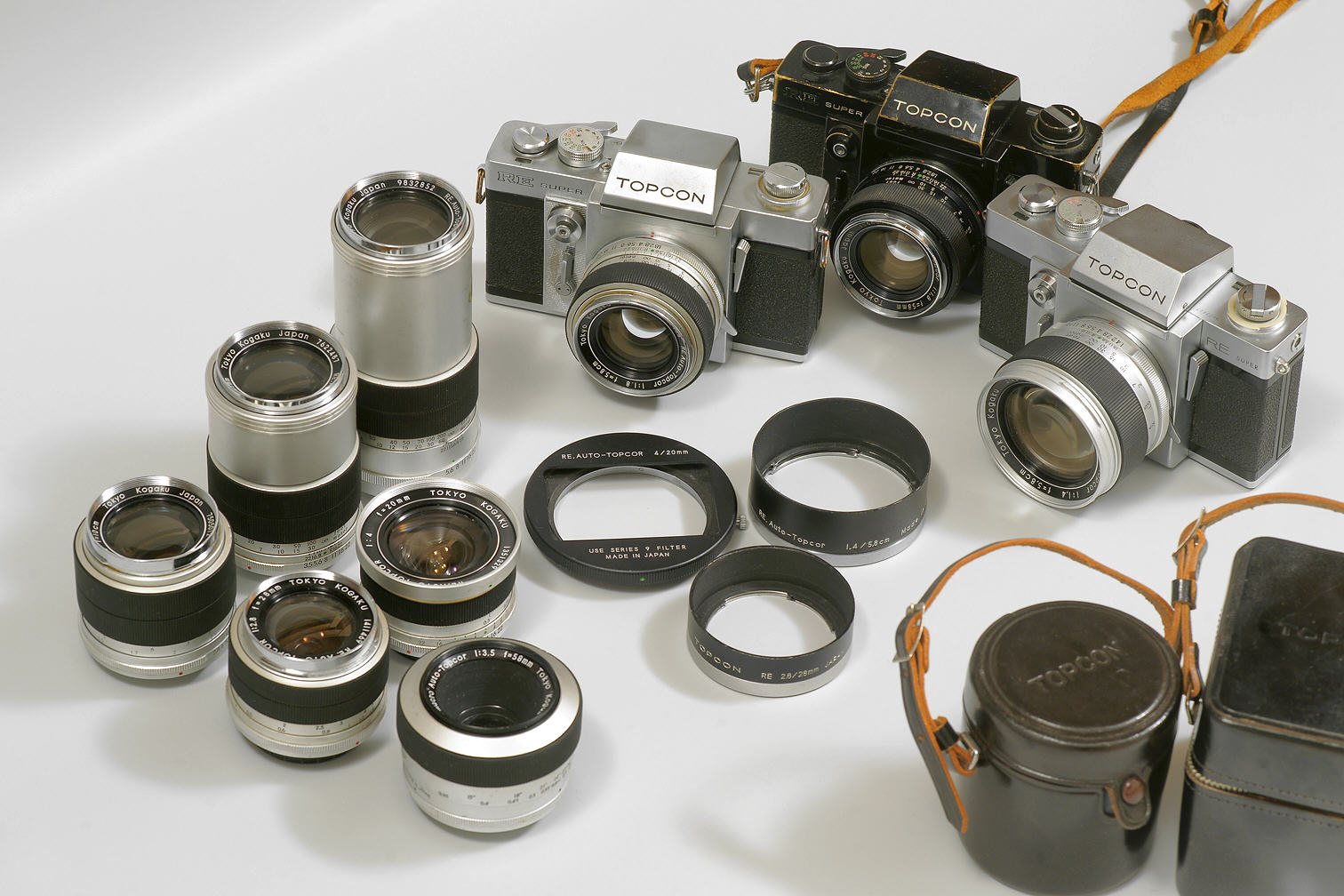
Topcon RE Super and RE.Auto-Topcor lenses

Tokyo Kogaku updated its leaf-shutter SLR line with the Wink Mirror S in 1963, which added an interchangeable lens mount and a shutter-priority autoexposure mode. Lenses with the UV Topcor mount do not have an aperture control, which remained on the body. In Europe, the Wink Mirror S was sold as the Porst Reflex S. 1963 also brought the Topcon RE Super, which improved on the RS with full-aperture, through-the-lens metering; this was imported into the United States as the Beseler Topcon Super D and the UK/Australia/New Zealand as the Hanimex Topcon RE Super.

Numerous minor changes were implemented while the RE Super was being sold. In addition, the Exakta-mount lens line was updated again with the RE.Auto-Topcor designation, carrying distinctive silver barrels. In about 1965, the US Navy tested cameras from several Japanese and German manufacturers (including the Nikon F). The Super D was the winner of this competition, and was used exclusively by the Navy until 1977.

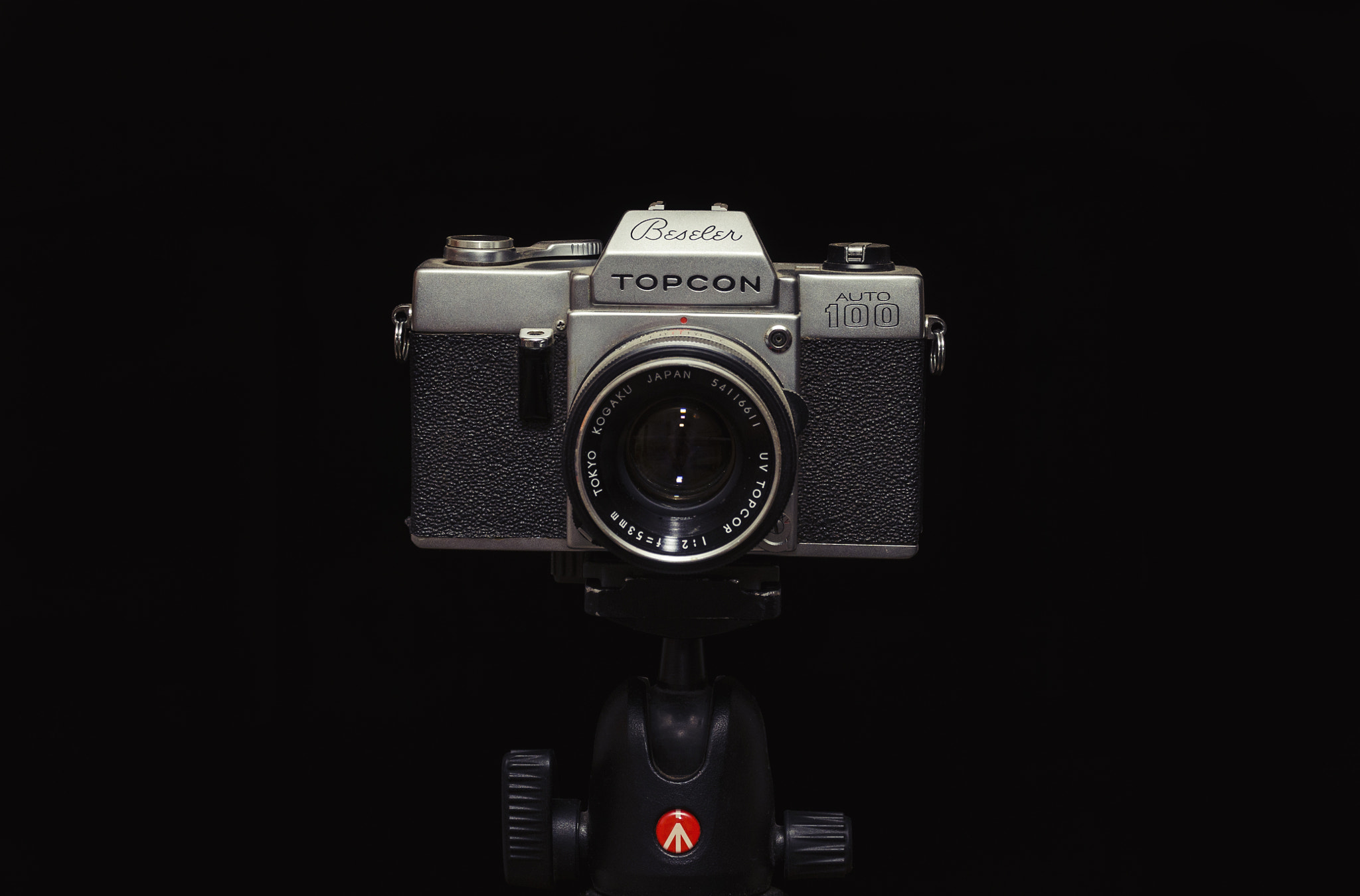
Beseler Auto 100 / Topcon Uni with UV Topcor lens

In 1964, another upgrade to the leaf-shutter line, the Topcon Uni, made it the world's first SLR with through-the-lens metering and shutter-priority autoexposure; in the US it was sold as the Beseler Auto 100. Beseler touted the camera's "Meter-inside-the-Mirror". The Topcon RE-2 was introduced in 1965 aimed at the mid-range market, switching the horizontally-running focal plane shutter for a vertical Copal unit; this is immediately distinguishable through the switched positions of the shutter speed selector (now on the front of the body) and the shutter release (on the top deck).

As before, the RE-2 was sold under rebadged version as the Beseler Topcon D-1 and Hanimex Topcon RE-2. By 1969, the last of the 35mm leaf-shutter SLRs was released, the Topcon Unirex, sold in the US as the Beseler Topcon Unirex; its primary upgrade was the ability to switch between spot and average metering patterns, though a 1972 export-only model, the Unirex EE, removed that function.

The Topcon Super DM succeeded the RE Super in 1973; the primary improvement was the ability to attach a winder and later motor drive, and it was sold until Tokyo Kogaku withdrew from the photographic market in 1981, again with numerous minor changes throughout its production. Also in 1974, the production of the IC-1 AUTO SLR started; "IC" means "Integrated Circuit", used for aperture control. The IC-1 uses the UV mount and has a body shape similar to the Unirex, but incorporates a focal plane shutter instead while maintaining the capability of shutter-priority autoexposure. The Hi Topcor lenses released alongside the IC-1 may not be fully compatible with earlier cameras. The final cameras with an Exakta-based mount were released in 1977 and 1978, the Topcon RE200 and RE300, respectively, which also were sold under the Exakta brand as the EDX2 and EDX3.

The last SLR released by Tokyo Optical was the Topcon RM300, which uses the Pentax K-mount and rebadged with numerous versions including Exakta CX5, KE 4 and KE 5; Rony RS1; Carena KSM 1; Quantaray D2-RZ. A successor was developed, the K-mount Topcon AM-1, but was not released before Tokyo Optical withdrew from the market in 1981; Cima Optical, to which Tokyo Optical previously had subcontracted lens assembly, purchased the design and released it as the Cimko LS-1 in 1983.

=== Lenses for 35mm SLRs ===
Tokyo Optical produced both fixed and interchangeable lens SLR cameras; the interchangeable lenses were split into two separate types, one for cameras with focal plane shutters (using an Exakta bayonet mount) and another for cameras with leaf shutters (using the UV mount).

The fixed-lens SLRs had leaf shutters; the earliest lenses fitted to the PR and PR II were 50 mm f/2.8 four element / three group designs derived from the venerable Tessar. These were succeeded by the 48 mm f/2.0 double Gauss lens fitted to the Wink Mirror and Wink Mirror E.

Mechanical features on a RE Auto-Topcor lens

Focal plane shutter SLRs use an Exakta mount; the earliest of these lenses were introduced with the Topcon R in 1957: 35 mm f/2.8, 58 mm f/1.8, 100 mm f/2.8, and 135 mm f/3.5, all labeled as Auto-Topcor with the triangular projection overlapping the front-mounted shutter release. These early Auto-Topcor lenses included the aperture charging lever; later production lenses and those sent to the export market omit the charging lever, as pressure on the lens button would open the aperture and close it down to the preset.

With the R II, the triangular flange was omitted from the same four lenses, now labeled as F Auto-Topcor with black-finished bodies, a rubber inset for the focusing ring, and a clear plastic window covering the distance scale. The F series added the automatic diaphragm action lever, at approximately 3 o'clock on the lens flange, which held the aperture open during composition and focusing, then when the shutter was released, stopped the diaphragm to its preset value.

The RE Auto-Topcor series, distinguished by their silver-colored bodies and black rubber inset focusing rings, added an aperture keying pin to allow the body to read the aperture selected on the lens. This pin rides in a arc-shaped groove from approximately 11 o'clock to 1 o'clock on the lens flange.

Exakta-mount Topcor lenses
Name	FL	Ap.	Constr.	Angle	Min. focus	Filt. (mm)	Φ×L	Wgt.	Notes
Ultra wide angle lenses
RE Auto-Topcor	20	f/4.0	8e	94°	0.30 m (1 ft)	62	?	215 g (7.6 oz)	
Wide-angle lenses
RE Auto-Topcor	25	f/3.5–22	7e/7g	82°	0.17 m (6 1/2 in)	Ser.IX / Rear	?×54 mm (2 1/8 in)	320 g (11 oz)	
RE Auto-Topcor	28	f/2.8–22	10e	75°	0.30 m (1 ft)	62	?	310 g (11 oz)	
Macro-Topcor	30	f/3.5	6e	70°	(focusing tube or bellows)	22.5	?	52 g (1.8 oz)	
RE Auto-Topcor	35	f/2.8–22	7e/5g	63°	0.23 m (9 in)	49	?×57 mm (2 1/4 in)	250 g (8.8 oz)	Also produced as Auto-Topcor and F Auto-Topcor types.
Normal lenses
RE GN Topcor M	50	f/1.4	7e	45°	0.40 m (1.3 ft)	62	?	350 g (12 oz)	
RE GN Topcor	50	f/1.8–22	6e	45°	0.40 m (1.3 ft)	62	?	290 g (10 oz)	
RE Auto-Topcor	58	f/1.4–16	7e/5g	41°	0.46 m (18 in)	62	?×43 mm (1 11/16 in)	300 g (11 oz)	
RE Auto-Topcor	58	f/1.8–22	6e/5g	41°	0.46 m (18 in)	49	?×38 mm (1 1/2 in)	220 g (7 3/4 oz)	Also produced as Auto-Topcor and F Auto-Topcor types.
RE Macro Auto-Topcor	58	f/3.5	5e/4g	41°	?	49	?	260 g (9.2 oz)	
Macro-Topcor	58	f/3.5	5e/4g	41°	(focusing tube or bellows)	49	?	120 g (4.2 oz)	
Portrait lenses
RE Auto-Topcor	85	f/1.8	6e	28.5°	0.91 m (3 ft)	62	?	420 g (15 oz)	
RE Zoom Auto-Topcor	87~205	f/4.7	13e	28~12°	2.7 m (9 ft)	58	?	710 g (25 oz)	
R Topcor	90	f/3.5–22	3e/3g	27°	1.1 m (3 1/2 ft)	49	?×62 mm (2 7/16 in)	99 g (3 1/2 oz)	Pre-set diaphragm
RE Auto-Topcor	100	f/2.8–22	5e/3g	24.5°	1.2 m (4 ft)	49	?×54 mm (2 1/8 in)	280 g (9.9 oz)	Also produced as Auto-Topcor and F Auto-Topcor types.
R Topcor	135	f/2.0–22	6e/4g	18°	1.8 m (6 ft)	77	?×135 mm (5 5/16 in)	1,100 g (40 oz)	Pre-set diaphragm
RE Auto-Topcor	135	f/3.5–22	4e/3g	18°	1.2 m (4 ft)	49	?×86 mm (3 3/8 in)	400 g (14 oz)	Also produced as Auto-Topcor and F Auto-Topcor types.
Macro-Topcor	135	f/4.0	3e/3g	18°	(focusing tube or bellows)	49	?	268 g (9.5 oz)	
Telephoto lenses
R Topcor	200	f/4.0–32	5e/3g	12°	2.1 m (7 ft)	62	?×154 mm (6 1/16 in)	840 g (29 1/2 oz)	Pre-set diaphragm
RE Auto-Topcor	200	f/5.6–22	5e/4g	12°	3.0 m (10 ft)	49	?×144 mm (5 11/16 in)	460 g (16 oz)	
R Topcor	300	f/2.8–22	5e/4g	8°	4.6 m (15 ft)	62	?×380 mm (15 1/8 in)	3,300 g (120 oz)	Pre-set diaphragm
R Topcor	300	f/5.6–32	4e/4g	8°	4.6 m (15 ft)	62	?×183 mm (7 3/16 in)	740 g (26 oz)	Pre-set diaphragm
RE Auto-Topcor	300	f/5.6	4e/4g	8°	4.6 m (15 ft)	62	?	750 g (26 oz)	
RE Auto-Topcor	500	f/5.6	5e	5°	6.1 m (20 ft)	62	?	2,100 g (74 oz)	

Interchangeable lenses for leaf-shutter SLRs are labeled UV Topcor or Hi Topcor. Adaptors exist to mount UV-mount lenses on R-mount bodies and vice versa; however, the aperture control for UV/Hi Topcor lenses is mounted on the body, so the UV lens to R-mount body adapter includes an iris control ring. In addition, the leaf-shutter SLR lenses are relatively slow compared to the Exakta/R-mount equivalent focal lengths.

UV-mount Topcor lenses
Name	FL	Ap.	Constr.	Angle	Min. focus	Filt. (mm)	Φ×L	Wgt.	Notes
Wide-angle lenses
UV Topcor	28	f/4.0	6e	75°	0.38 m (15 in)	49	?	170 g (6.0 oz)	
UV Topcor	35	f/3.5–22	6e/5g	63°	0.38 m (15 in)	49	?×40 mm (1 9/16 in)	160 g (5.6 oz)	
Normal lenses
Hi Topcor	50	f/2.0–22	6e	47°	0.61 m (2 ft)	49	?	142 g (5.0 oz)	
UV Topcor	53	f/2.0–22	6e/4g	43°	0.69 m (27 in)	49	?×27 mm (1 1/16 in)	160 g (5 3/4 oz)	
Portrait lenses
Hi Topcor	87~205	f/4.7	13e	28~12°	2.7 m (9 ft)	58	?	710 g (25 oz)	
UV Topcor	100	f/4.0–22	5e/5g	24°	1.5 m (5 ft)	49	?×30 mm (1 3/16 in)	220 g (7.8 oz)	
UV Topcor	135	f/4.0–22	5e/5g	18°	1.7 m (5 1/2 ft)	49	?×73 mm (2 7/8 in)	305 g (10.8 oz)	
Telephoto lenses
UV Topcor	200	f/4.0	6e	12°	6.1 m (20 ft)	67	?	520 g (18 oz)	
Teleconverters
UV Topcor	2×	+2	3e	approx. 1/2	unchanged	—N/a	?	?	Used with lenses ≥100 mm

== In Australia ==
TOPCON has operated since 2003 started operations from its Brisbane office, with an office in Technology Park Adelaide at Mawson Lakes, South Australia and representatives in Sydney.

== Topcon Positioning Systems ==
Topcon Positioning Systems Inc., provides positioning technology for surveyors, civil engineers, construction contractors, equipment owners and operators.

Topcon Corporation acquired Advanced Grade Technology in 1995 and became known as Topcon Laser Systems.

In August 2000, Topcon acquired JPS Inc., of San Jose, California, a provider of precision GPS and GPS/GLONASS products.

With the introduction of a series of positioning products, Topcon Laser Systems grew, and consolidated the survey instruments, GPS products and construction positioning products divisions in July 2001. Topcon Positioning Systems was formed.

== Topcon Healthcare ==
In September 1970, Topcon established Topcon Instrument Corporation of America which is currently Topcon Healthcare, Inc., (formerly Topcon Medical Systems, Inc.), is a developer and supplier of diagnostic equipment for the ophthalmic community. In April 2018, Topcon established a medical software division, Topcon Healthcare Solutions, Inc., a developer of eyecare software and provider of related healthcare services.

Topcon ophthalmic (eye) machines are widely used in many health centers in Americas, Western Europe, Australia, and are often interconnected to their surrounding IT systems through the RS232 protocol using DICOM.

== Gallery ==
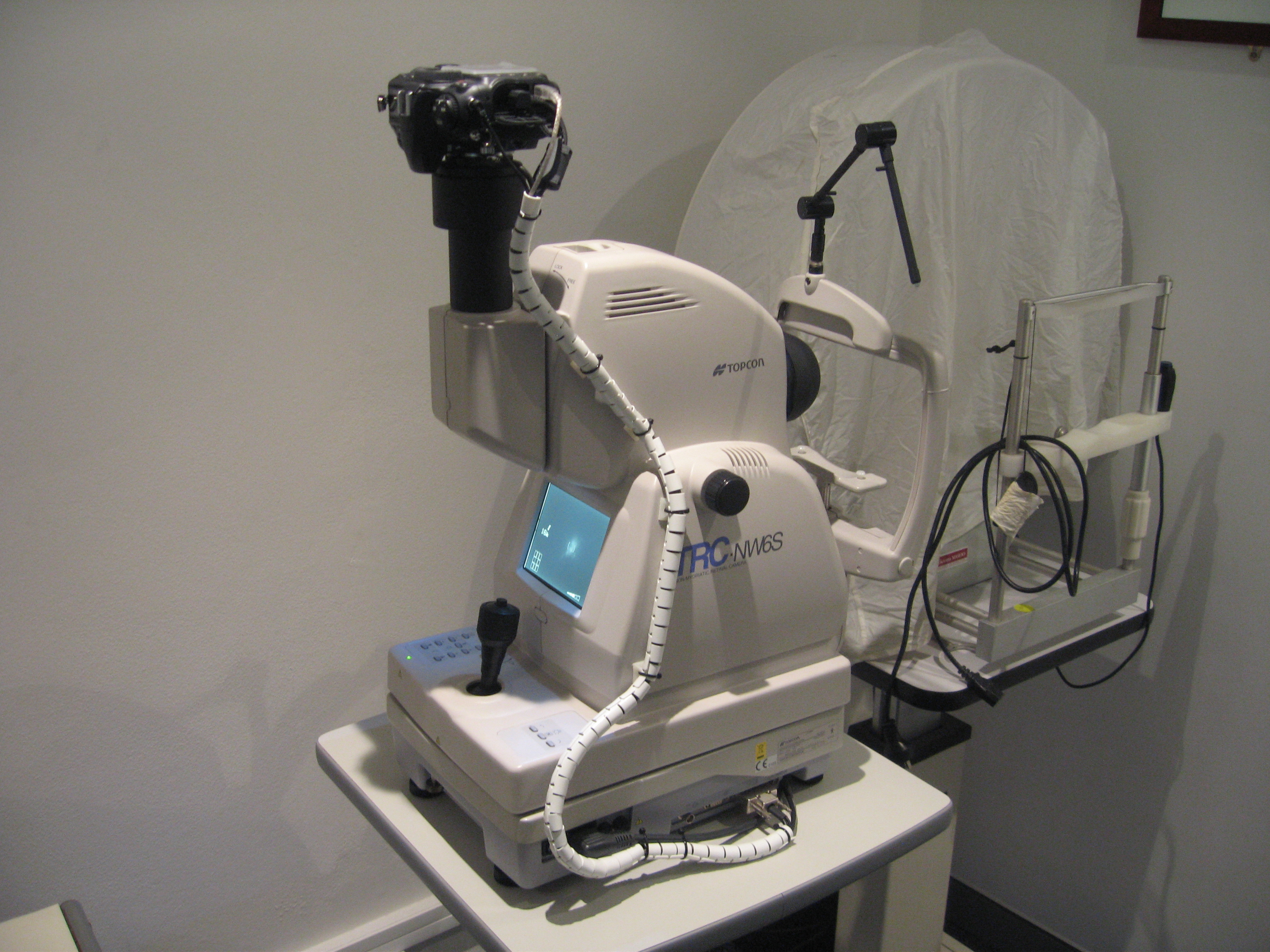
A Topcon non-mydriatic retinal camera

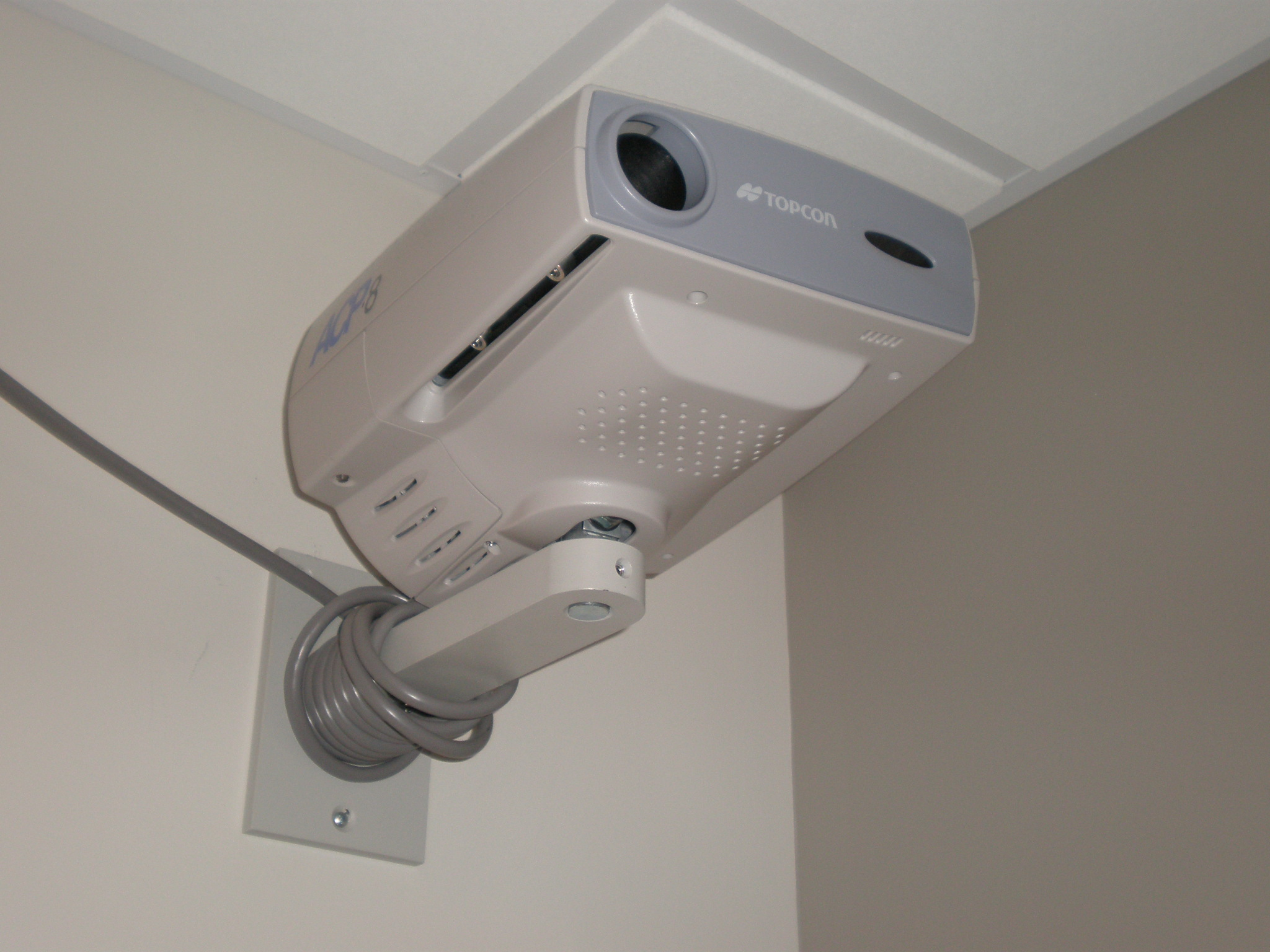
A Topcon ACP 8 projector

Usage demonstration of a Topcon GR-3 global navigation satellite system

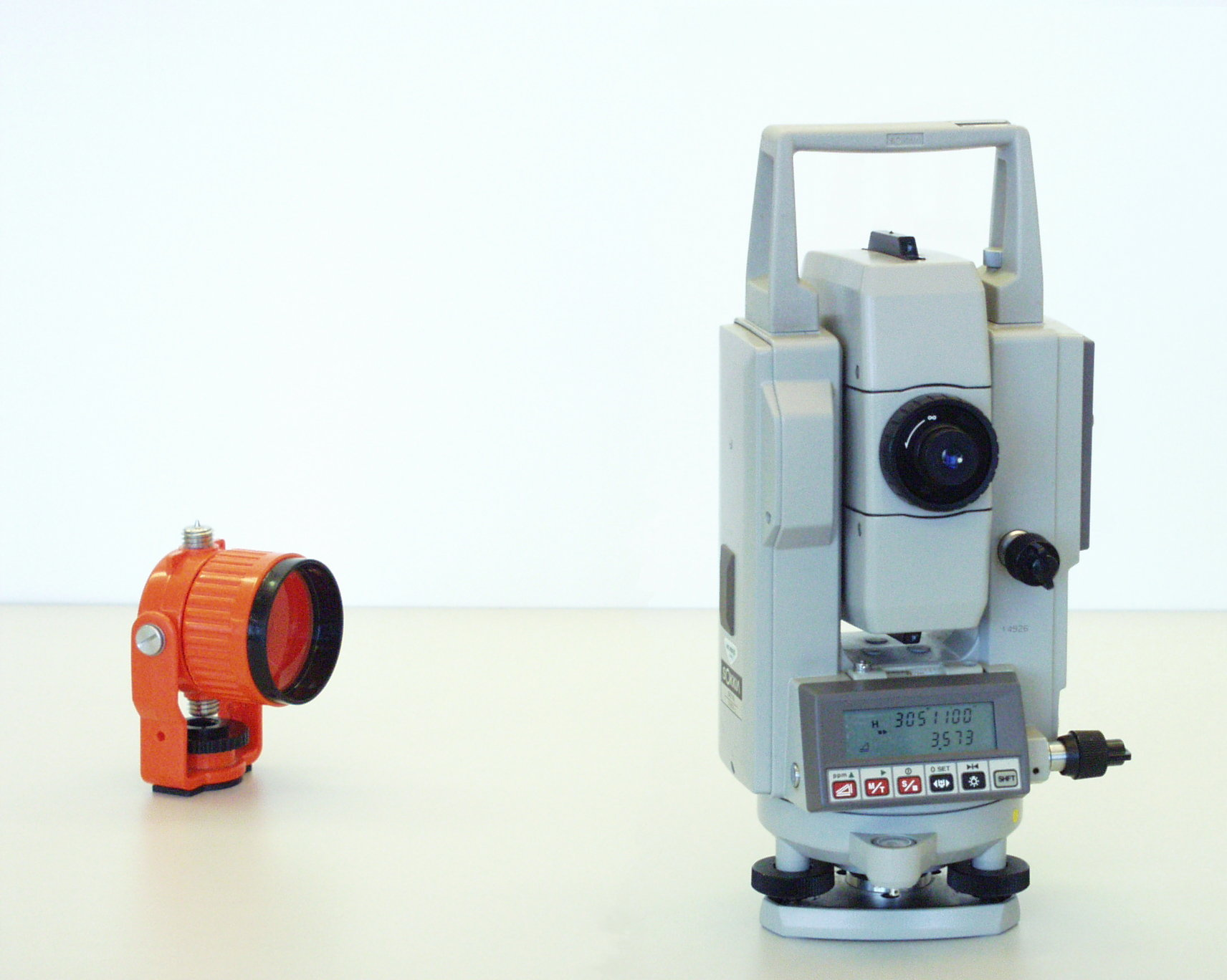
A laser tachymeter and surveying prism made by Sokkia
