= History of the single-lens reflex camera =

Aspect of photography history

The history of the single-lens reflex camera (SLR) begins with the use of a reflex mirror in a camera obscura described in 1676, but it took a long time for the design to succeed for photographic cameras. The first patent was granted in 1861, and the first cameras were produced in 1884, but while elegantly simple in concept, they were very complex in practice. One by one these complexities were overcome as optical and mechanical technology advanced, and in the 1960s the SLR camera became the preferred design for many high-end camera formats.

The advent of digital point-and-shoot cameras in the 1990s through the 2010s with LCD viewfinder displays reduced the appeal of the SLR for the low end of the market, and in the 2010s and 2020s smartphones have taken this place. The SLR remained the camera design of choice for mid-range photographers, ambitious amateur and professional photographers well into the 2010s, but by the 2020s had become greatly challenged if not largely superseded by the mirrorless interchangeable-lens camera, with notable brands such as Nikon and Canon having stopped releasing new flagship DSLR cameras for several years in order to focus on mirrorless designs.

Cross-section view of a typical 35 mm SLR camera: 1. Front-mount Lens; 2. Reflex mirror; 3. Focal plane shutter; 4. 135 film or 35 mm format sensor; 5. Focusing screen; 6. Condensing lens; 7. Pentaprism; 8. Eyepiece

== Early large and medium format SLRs ==
The photographic single-lens reflex camera (SLR) was invented in 1861 by Thomas Sutton, a photography author and camera inventor who ran a photography related company together with Louis Désiré Blanquart-Evrard on Jersey. Only a few of his SLRs were made. The first production SLR with a brand name was Calvin Rae Smith's Monocular Duplex (USA, 1884). Other early SLR cameras were constructed, for example, by Louis van Neck (Belgium, 1889), Thomas Rudolphus Dallmeyer (England, 1894) and Max Steckelmann (Germany, 1896), and Graflex of the United States and Konishi in Japan produced SLR cameras as early as 1898 and 1907 respectively. These first SLRs were large format cameras. While SLR cameras were not very popular at the time, they proved useful for some work. These cameras were used at waist level; the ground glass screen was viewed directly, using a large hood to keep out extraneous light. In most cases, the mirror had to be raised manually as a separate operation before the shutter could be operated.

As with camera technology in general, SLR cameras became available in smaller and smaller sizes. Medium format SLRs soon became common, at first larger box cameras and later "pocketable" models such as the Ihagee Vest-Pocket Exakta of 1933.

== Development of the 35 mm SLR ==
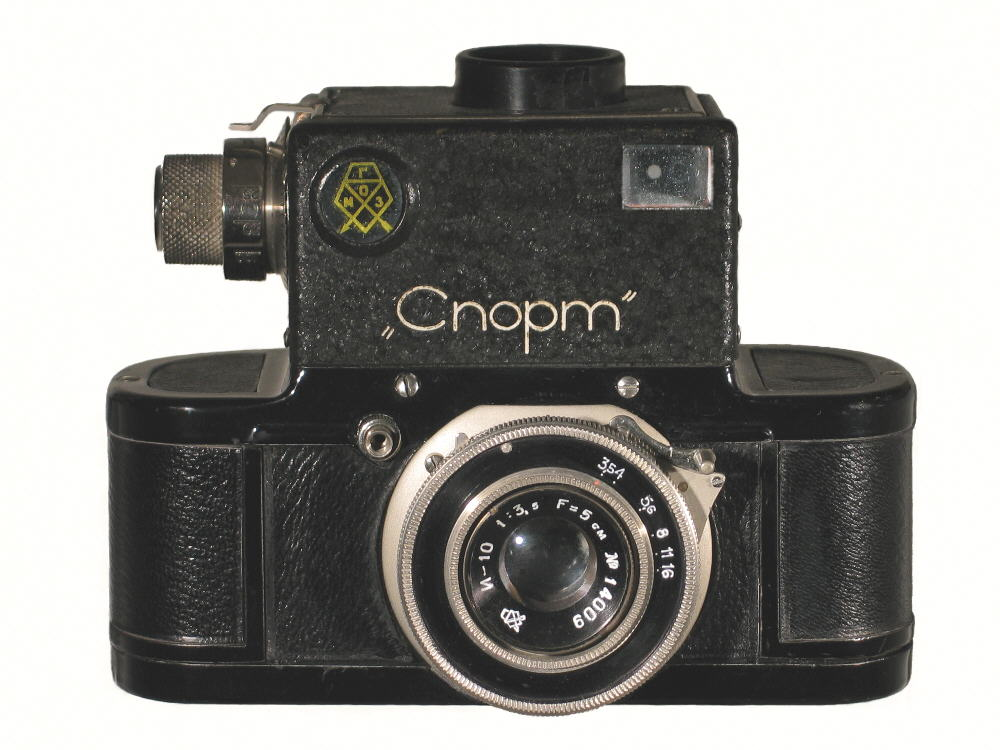
Russian: Спорт (Sport)

The first 35mm prototype SLR was the "Filmanka" developed in 1931 by A. Min in the Soviet Union. In 1933 A.O. Gelgar developed the "GelVeta" also in the USSR, later renamed Спорт ("Sport"). "Sport" was a very smart design with a 24mm × 36mm frame size, but, according to some sources, it did not enter the market until 1937, although there is now some evidence emerging that "Sport" may have been in limited production before 1936. Because of the probable production in small numbers it has been claimed not to be the first mass-produced 35mm SLR.

=== Early innovations ===
Early 35 mm SLR cameras had functionality that was similar to larger models, with a waist-level ground-glass viewfinder and a mirror that remained in the taking position and blacked out the viewfinder after an exposure, and then returned when the film was wound on. Innovations that transformed the SLR were the pentaprism eye-level viewfinder and the instant-return mirror—the mirror flipped briefly up during exposure, immediately returning to the viewfinding position. The half-silvered fixed pellicle mirror, without even the brief blackout of the instant-return mirror, was also innovative but did not become standard. Through-the-lens light metering was another important advance. As electronics advanced, new functionality, discussed below, became available.

=== Exakta ===
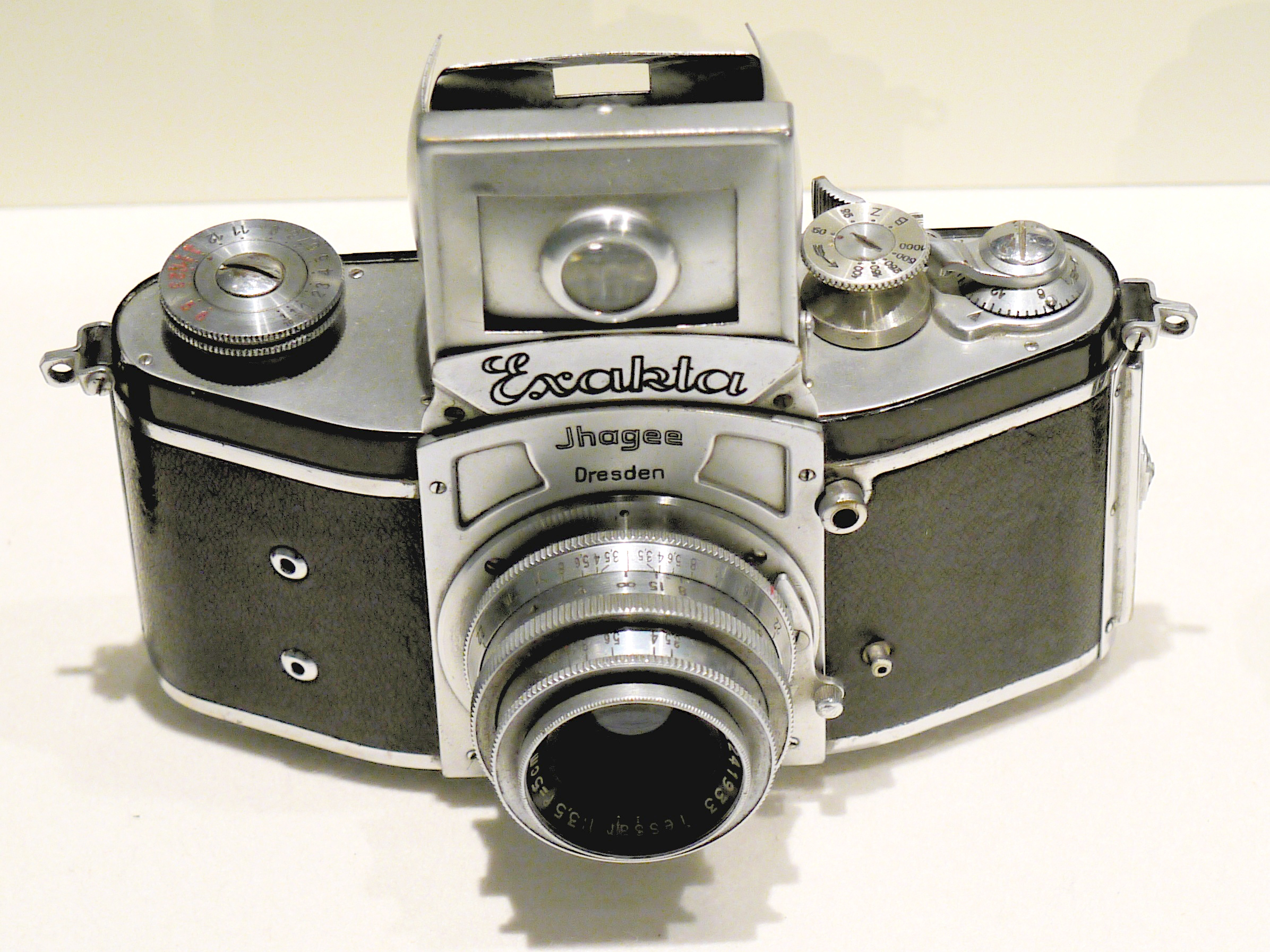
Ihagee Kine Exakta 1 of 1936

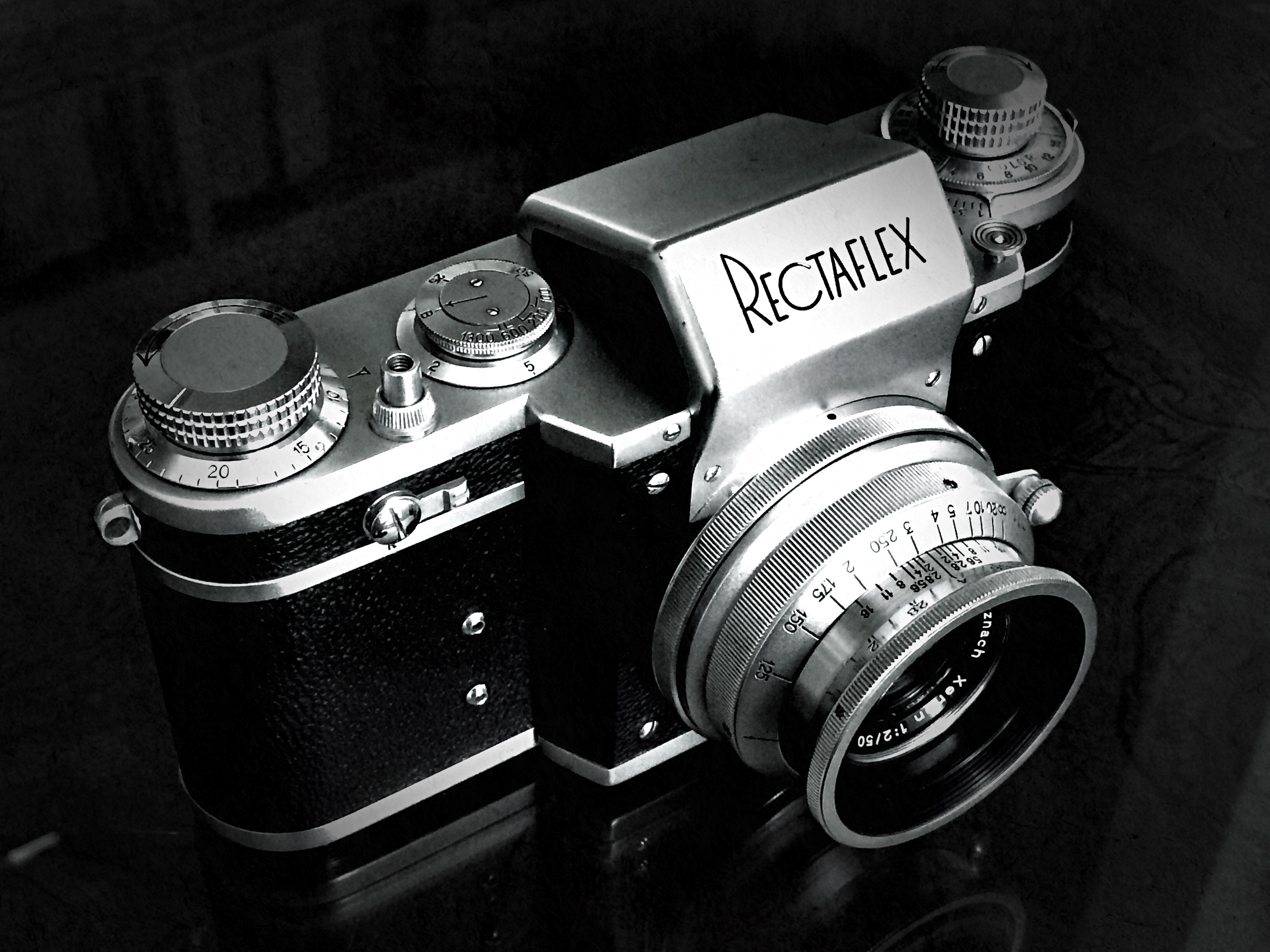
Rectaflex, the first pentaprism SLR for eye-level viewing

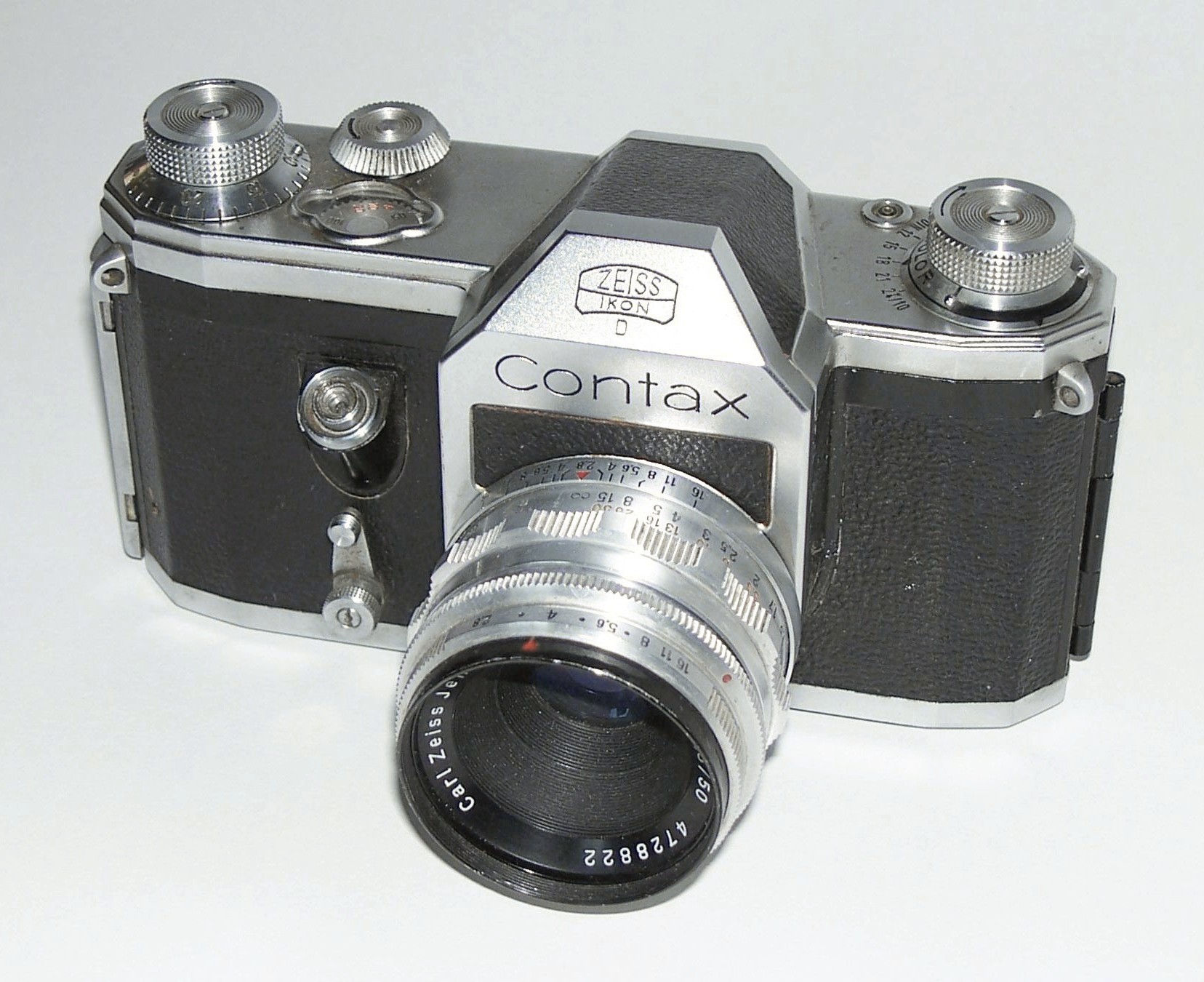
The historic East Germany Contax S, the second pentaprism SLR for eye-level viewing

A perspective drawing showing how a pentaprism corrects a laterally reversed SLR image.

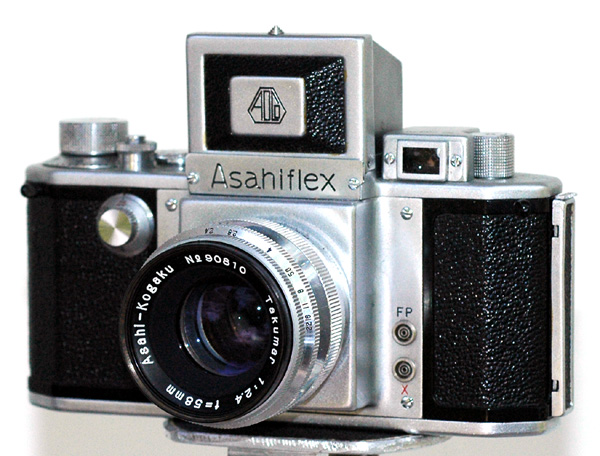
Asahiflex — the first single-lens reflex camera made in Japan

The first 35mm format SLR in large scale production was the Ihagee Kine Exakta, produced in 1936 in Germany, which was fundamentally a scaled-down Vest-Pocket Exakta. This camera used a waist-level finder.

Various other models were produced, such as the Kine-Exakta, the Exakta II, the Exakta Varex (featuring an interchangeable pentaprism eye-level viewfinder and identified in the United States as the 'Exakta V'), the Exakta Varex VX (identified in the United States as the 'Exakta VX'), the Exakta VX IIa, the Exakta VX IIb, the Exakta VX500 and the Exakta VX1000. Ihagee also manufactured less expensive cameras under the 'Exa' camera label, such as the Exa, the Exa Ia, the Exa II, the Exa IIa, the Exa IIb (which was generally not considered part of the "official" Exa line), and the Exa 500. The Exacta sold well and triggered other camera manufacturers to develop 35mm SLRs. Sales were particularly strong in the medical and scientific fields. A large range of lenses and accessories were made by a variety of manufacturers, turning the camera into one of the first system cameras, although motor drives and bulk loading backs were never produced by Ihagee.

=== Rectaflex ===
Rectaflex was the name of an Italian camera maker from 1947 to 1958. It was also the name of their sole model. The Rectaflex was a 35 mm SLR camera with a focal plane shutter, interchangeable lenses, and a pentaprism eye-level finder. Rectaflex (followed by Contax S) was the first SLR camera introducing the modern pentaprism eye-level finder. The first prototype (Rectaflex 947) was presented in 1947, with a final presentation in April 1948 and start of series production (A 1000) in September the same year, thus hitting the market one year before the Contax S, presented in 1949. Both were preceded by Alpa-Reflex, first presented to a wider public in April 1944 at the Swiss Trade Fair in Basel (Schweizer Mustermesse). Alpa's production was slow up to 1945, and it lacked a pentaprism, so the image was reversed left-to-right.

=== Zeiss ===
Zeiss had begun work on a 35mm SLR camera in 1936 or 1937. This camera used an eye-level pentaprism, which allowed eye-level-viewing of an image oriented correctly from left to right. Waist-level finders, however, showed a reversed image, which the photographer had to mentally adjust for while composing the image by looking downward and viewing and focusing. To brighten the viewfinder image, Zeiss incorporated a fresnel lens in between the ground-glass screen and the pentaprism. This design principle became the conventional SLR design used today.

World War II intervened, and the Zeiss SLR did not emerge as a production camera until Zeiss, in the newly created factory in East Germany, introduced the Contax S in 1949, with production ending in 1951. The Italian Rectaflex, series 1000 went into series production the year before, in September 1948, thus being market-ready one year before the Contax. Both were historic progenitors of many later SLRs that adopted this arrangement.

=== Praktiflex Praktica ===
In 1939, Kamerawerk Niedersedlitz Dresden presented the Praktiflex at the Leipzig spring fair. The camera was a waist type with an M40x1 screw mount and a horizontal cloth focal shutter. This camera is the pattern for most of the 35 mm SLR cameras and also for the Japanese and the digital SLR cameras today. After the war, Praktiflex was the most manufactured 35 mm SLR in Dresden, especially for the Russians as reparations. KW changed to the M42 screw mount invented at Zeiss for Contax S—later used by Pentax, Yashica and others to become a near universal mount. In 1949, it was redesigned with longer shutter speeds, and the name was changed to Praktica. In 1958, KW Niedersedlitz became a part of the VEB Kamer und Kinowerk (old Zeiss), later VEB Pentacon. Praktica was typically a consumer/amateur camera. Many developments were added. It was produced until 2000.

1. 1949 Praktica until Praktica V
2. 1964 Praktica Nova
3. 1969 Praktica L with vertical metal focal plane shutter
4. 1979 Praktica B with new bayonet mount

Highlights:

1. 1956 Praktica FX2 2. version with full automatic internal aperture activator, world standard for more than 20 years.
2. 1959 Praktica IV with permanent eye-level pentaprism.
3. 1964 Praktica V with instant return mirror.
4. 1965 Praktica Mat first European TTL semiautomatic (work aperture) in production
5. 1966 Praktica Super TL with centerweighted TTL
6. 1969 Praktica LLC world first camera with electric simulation of aperture

From 1952 to 1960 the KW factory/VEB Pentacon also produced the Praktina, a system SLR camera for professionals and advanced amateurs with a bayonet mount and focal shutter, but production was closed, partly for political reasons. Praktica was the camera that could be sold outside the DDR and bring foreign currency to the country.

=== Edixa ===
Another German manufacturer, Edixa was a brand of camera manufactured by Wirgin Kamera Werk, based in Wiesbaden, West Germany. This company's product line included 35mm SLR cameras such as the Edixa Reflex, which featured a Steinel 55mm f/1.9 Quindon lens and an Isco Traegan 50mm f/2.8 lens, the Edixamat Reflex, the Edixa REX TTL, and the Edixa Electronica. The removable pentaprism could be swapped for a waistlevel viewfinder with a pop up magnifier. The lens mount was the same screw thread as the Praktica.

== Rise of the Japanese SLRs ==
The earliest Japanese SLR for roll film was perhaps the Baby Super Flex (or Super Flex Baby), a 127 camera made by Umemoto and distributed by Kikōdō from 1938. This camera had a leaf shutter, but two years later came the Shinkoflex, a 6×6 camera made by Yamashita Shōkai, with a focal-plane shutter and interchangeable lenses. However, Japanese camera makers concentrated on rangefinder and twin-lens reflex cameras (as well as simpler viewfinder cameras), similar to those of the Western makers.

=== Pentax ===
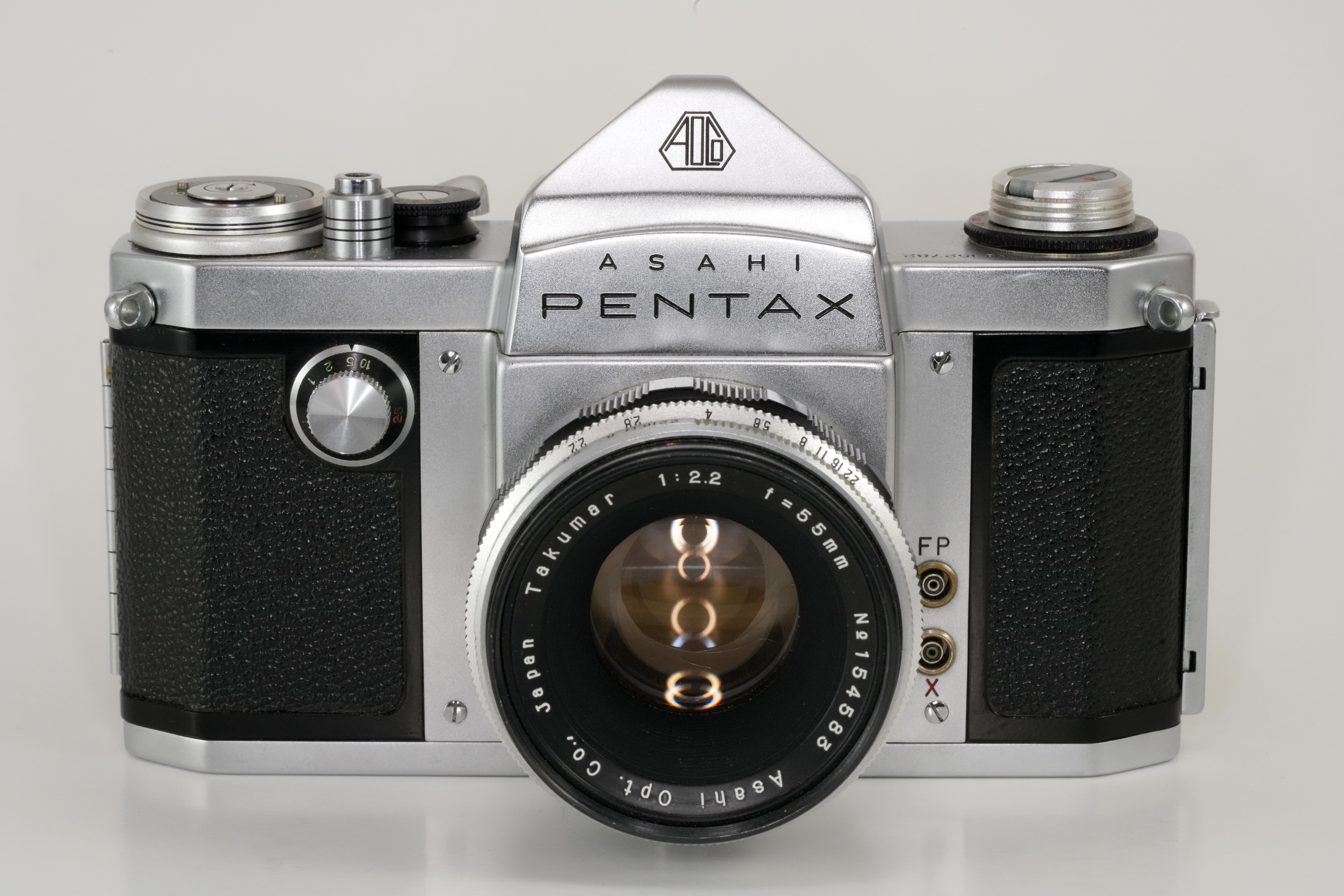
1957, Asahi Pentax

The Asahi Optical Company took a different manufacturing path, inspired by the German SLRs. Its first model, the Asahiflex I, existed in prototype form in 1951 and production in 1952, making it the first Japanese-built 35mm SLR. The Asahiflex IIB of 1954 was the first Japanese SLR with an instant-return mirror. Previously, the mirror would remain up and the viewfinder black until the user released the shutter button. In 1957, the Asahi Pentax became the first Japanese fixed-pentaprism SLR; its success led Asahi to eventually rename itself Pentax. This was the first SLR to use the right-hand single-stroke film advance lever of the Leica M3 of 1954 and Nikon S2 of 1955. Asahi (starting with the Asahi Pentax) and many other camera makers used the M42 lens mount from the Contax S, which came to be called the Pentax screw mount. Pentax is now part of Ricoh.

=== Miranda ===
Orion's (later name-changed to Miranda's) Miranda SLR camera was sold in Japan from August 1955 with the launch of the Miranda T camera. The camera was narrowly the first Japanese-made pentaprism 35mm SLR. It featured a removable pentaprism for eye-level viewing that could be removed for use as a waist-level finder.

=== Yashica ===
The Yashica Company introduced its own SLR in 1959, the Pentamatic, an advanced, modern 35mm SLR camera with a proprietary bayonet-mount. The Pentamatic featured an automatic stop-down diaphragm (offered only with the Auto Yashinon 50mm/1.8 lens), instant-return mirror, a fixed pentaprism, and a mechanical focal-plane shutter with speeds of 1-1/1000 second, along with additional interchangeable lenses.

=== Zunow ===
The Zunow SLR, which went on sale in 1958 (in Japan only), was the first Japanese 35mm SLR camera with an automatic diaphragm, which stopped down to the preselected aperture upon release of the shutter. (Although this invention had been anticipated by the 1948 Gamma Duflex and 1954 Praktina FX-A which could be used with a semi-automatic diaphragm, which stopped down automatically, but had to be opened manually after the exposure.) The automatic diaphragm feature eliminated one downside to viewing with an SLR: the darkening of the viewfinder screen image when the photographer selected a small lens aperture. The Zunow Optical Company also supplied the Miranda Camera Company with lenses for their Miranda T SLR cameras.

== General operation of a 35 mm SLR ==
A photographer using an SLR would view and focus with the lens diaphragm (aperture) fully open; he then had to adjust the aperture just before taking the picture.

- Some lenses had manual diaphragms—the photographer had to take the camera down from his eye and look at the aperture ring to set it.
- A "pre-set" diaphragm had two aperture rings next to each other: one could be set in advance to the aperture needed for the picture while the other ring controlled the diaphragm directly. Turning the second ring all the way clockwise gave full aperture; turn it all the way counterclockwise gave the preset shooting aperture, speeding up the process. Such lenses were commonly made into the 1960s.
- A lens with an "automatic" diaphragm allows the photographer to forget about closing the diaphragm to shooting aperture; such diaphragms have been taken for granted for decades. Usually this means a pin or lever on the back of the lens is pushed or released by a part of the shutter release mechanism in the camera body; the external automatic diaphragms on lenses for Exakta and Miranda cameras were the exception to that. Some lenses had "semi-automatic" diaphragms that closed to shooting aperture like an automatic diaphragm but had to be re-opened manually with a flip of a ring on the lens.

When the shutter release is pressed the mirror flips up against the viewing screen, the diaphragm closes down (if automatic), the shutter opens and closes, the mirror returns to its 45-degree viewing position (on most or all 35 mm SLRs made since 1970) and the automatic diaphragm re-opens to full aperture.

Most but not all SLRs had shutters behind the mirror, next to the film; if the shutter was in or immediately behind the lens it had to be open before the photographer clicked the shutter and then had to close, then open, then close.

== Standardization of designs ==
In the following 30 years the vast majority of SLRs standardized the layout of the controls. The film was transported from left to right, so the rewind crank was on the left, followed in order by the pentaprism, shutter speed dial, shutter release, and the film advance lever, which in some cameras was ratcheted so that multiple strokes could be used to advance the film. Some cameras, such as Nikon's Nikomat FT cameras (marketed under the brand-name 'Nikkormat' in European countries and elsewhere) and some models of Olympus OM series, deviated from this layout by placing the shutter speed control as a ring around the lens mount.

=== Miranda Camera Company ===
Miranda produced early SLRs in the 1950s which were initially manufactured with external auto-diaphragms, then added a second mount with internal auto-diaphragm. To list some of Miranda's cameras with external diaphragm, there was the Miranda Sensorex line. The internal auto-diaphragm Miranda cameras consisted of the Miranda 'D', the popular Miranda 'F', the 'FV' and the 'G' model, which had a larger than normal reflex mirror thereby eliminating viewfinder image vignetting when the camera was used with long telephoto lenses. Miranda cameras were known in some photographic discussions as 'the poor man's Nikon'.

=== Periflex ===
One unique brand of cameras was the Corfield Periflex made by K. G. Corfield Ltd in England. Three models were produced from 1953, all of which used a retractable periscope lowered into the light path for focusing through the single lens. In the early models the periscope was lowered and raised manually. In the later models pressing the shutter release moved the spring-loaded periscope out of the film path before the focal-plane shutter operated

=== Minolta ===
Minolta's first SLR, the SR-2, was introduced to the export market in the same year (in fact, at the same Philadelphia show as the Canon and Nikon products) but had been on sale in Japan since August 1958. Lenses started with the designation 'Rokkor'. With the introduction of the SRT-101, the lenses added the designation of 'MC' for 'meter-coupled', and then later to 'MD' when the Minolta XD-11 was introduced with full-program mode. Minolta was taken over in 2003 by Konica, to form 'Konica-Minolta'. Konica-Minolta sold its imaging division to Sony in January 2006.

=== Nikon F ===
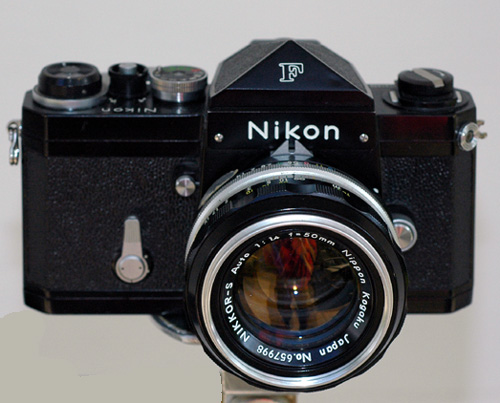
The revolutionary Nikon F, shown in black finish with standard, non-metering pentaprism and a 50mm f/1.4 7-element auto Nikkor lens attached. This and other auto Nikkor lenses standardized mostly on the 52mm front filter thread while some other large lenses used a large 72mm filter thread-size.

Nikon's 'F' model, introduced in April 1959 as the world's first system camera (if the commercially unsuccessful Praktina is not considered), became enormously successful and was the camera design that demonstrated the superiority of the SLR and of the Japanese camera manufacturers. This camera was the first SLR system that was adopted and used seriously by the general population of professional photographers, especially by those photographers covering the Vietnam War, and those news photographers utilizing motor-driven Nikon F's with 250-exposure backs to record the various launches of the space capsules in the Mercury, Gemini, and Apollo space programs, both in the 1960s. After the introduction of the Nikon F, the more expensive rangefinder cameras (those with focal plane shutters) became less attractive.

It was a combination of design elements that made the Nikon F successful. It featured interchangeable prisms and focusing screens; the camera had a depth-of-field preview button; the mirror had lock-up capability; it featured a large bayonet mount and a large lens release button; a single-stroke ratcheted film advance lever; a titanium-foil focal plane shutter; various types of flash synchronization; a rapid rewind lever; and a fully removable back. it was a well-made, extremely durable camera, and adhered closely to the then current, successful design scheme of the Nikon rangefinder cameras.

Instead of the M42 screw mount used by Pentax and other camera manufacturers, Nikon had introduced the three-claw F-mount bayonet lens mount system, which is still current in a modified form today. The focal plane shutter, unlike other SLRs of the period which used a cloth material for the focal plane shutter design (NOTE: with this design, it was possible to burn a hole into the cloth of the shutter during mirror lock-up in bright sunlight) used titanium foil which was rated for 100,000 cycles of releases of the shutter (according to Nikon). The F was also a modular camera, in which various assemblies such as the pentaprisms, the focusing screens, the special 35mm roll film 250 exposure film back and the Speed Magny film backs (two models: one using the Polaroid 100 (now 600) type pack films; and another Speed Magny was designed for 4×5 film accessories, including Polaroid's own 4×5 instant film back). These could be fitted and removed, allowing the camera to adapt to almost any particular task. It was the first 35 mm camera offered with a successful motor drive system.

Unlike most of the other manufacturers involved in 35mm camera production, the Nikon F was released with a full range of lenses from 21 mm to 1000 mm focal length. Nikon was also among the first to introduce what is commonly known today as 'mirror lenses' – lenses with Catadioptric system designs, which allowed the light path to be folded and thus yielded lens designs that were more compact than the standard telephoto designs. Subsequent top-of-the-line Nikon models carried on the F series, which has as of 2005 reached the F6 (although this camera has a fixed pentaprism). With the introduction and continued improvements being made in digital photography, the Nikon F6 is the last of the flagship Nikon F-line film SLRs.

=== Canon ===
In May 1959, the Canonflex SLR was introduced. The camera featured a quick return mirror and an automatic diaphragm, and was introduced with an interchangeable black pentaprism housing. It also featured newly developed 'R' series breech lock mount lenses. This SLR was superseded by the Canonflex RM, a fixed prism SLR which featured a built-in selenium cell meter. Later came the Canonflex R2000, with a top shutter speed of 1/2000 of a second. This model was also superseded by the Canonflex RM.

In 1962, FL series lenses were introduced along with a new camera body, the Canon FX, which had a built-in CdS light meter positioned on the front left side of the camera, a design which appeared much like the Minolta SR-7.

=== Olympus Pen F ===
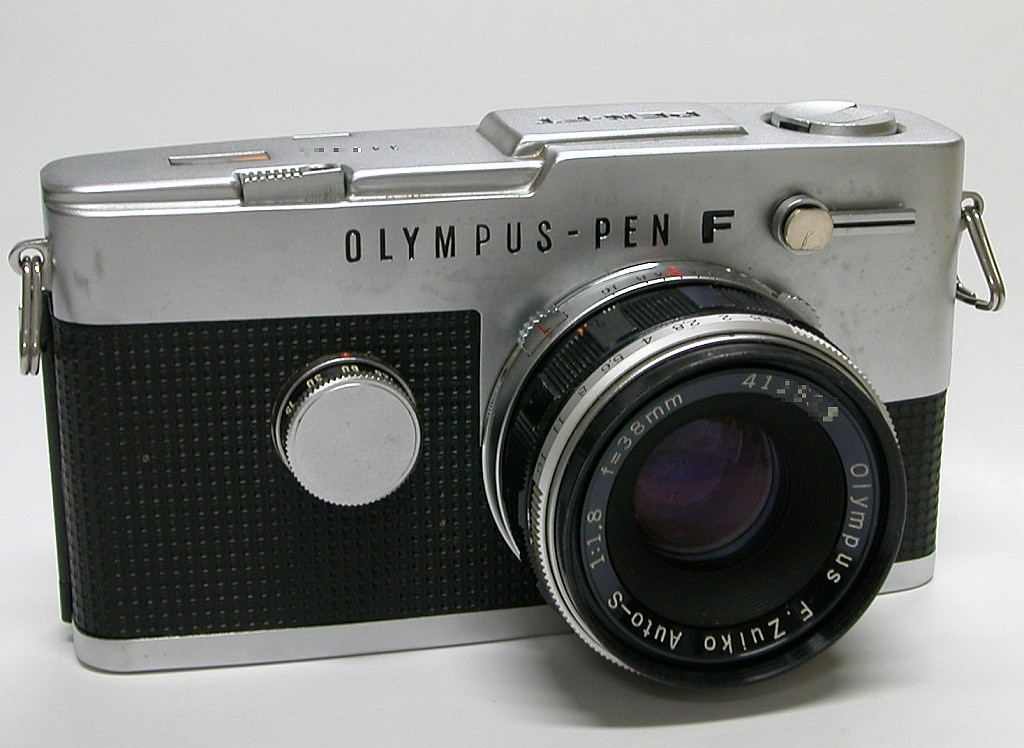
Olympus Pen FT with 38mm/F1.8

The Olympus Pen F series was introduced and produced by Olympus of Japan between 1963 and 1966. The System consisted of the original Olympus Pen F, later the behind-the-lens metering Pen FT, 1966–1972; and the non-metered version of the FT, known as the Olympus Pen FV, which was manufactured from 1967 to 1970. The design considerations used were unusual. The camera produced a half-frame 35 mm negative; it used a Porro prism as a design-replacement for the conventional pentaprism thus producing the 'flat top' appearance; and the view through the viewfinder was of 'portrait' orientation' (unlike standard 35mm SLRs which had 'landscape' orientation). These half-frame cameras were also exceptional in that all used a rotary shutter, rather than the traditional horizontally travelling focal-plane shutter commonly used in other SLR camera designs. The camera was produced with various interchangeable lenses. The smaller image format made the Pen F system one of the smallest SLR camera systems ever made. Only the Pentax Auto 110 was smaller, but the Pentax system was of much more limited range in terms of lenses and accessories.

== Introduction of light metering ==
Professional Photographers of the 1940s and 1950s time-period preferred to use hand-held meters such as the Weston or GE selenium cell light meters, and others which were common during these periods. These hand-held meters did not require any batteries and provided good analog readouts of shutter speeds, apertures, ASA (now referred to as 'ISO') and EV (exposure value). Selenium cells, however, could easily be judged for their light sensitivity by simply looking at the size of the cell's metering surface. A small surface meant it lacked low-light sensitivity. These would prove to be useless for in-camera light metering.

Built-in light metering with SLRs started with clip-on selenium cell meters. One such meter was made for the Nikon F which coupled to the shutter speed dial and the aperture ring. While the selenium cell area was big, the add-on made the camera look clumsy and unattractive. In order for built-in light metering to be successful in SLR cameras, the use of Cadmium Sulfide Cells (CdS) was imperative.

Some early SLRs featured a built-in CdS meter, usually on the front left side of the top plate, as in the Minolta SR-7. Other manufacturers, such as Miranda and Nikon introduced a CdS prism which fitted to their interchangeable prism SLR cameras. Nikon's early Photomic finder utilized a cover in front of the cell which was raised and a reading was taken and the photographer would either turn the coupled shutter speed dial and/or the coupled aperture ring to center a galvanometer-based meter needle shown in the viewfinder. The disadvantage of this early Photomic prism finder was that the meter had no ON/OFF switch so the meter was constantly 'ON', thus draining battery power. A later Photomic housing had an ON/OFF switch on the Pentaprism. CdS light meters proved more sensitive to light and thus metering in available light situations was becoming more prominent and useful. Further advances in CdS sensitivity, however, were needed as CdS cells suffered from a 'memory effect'. That is, if exposed to bright sunlight, the cell would require many minutes to return to normal operation and sensitivity.

== Through-the-lens metering ==
Through-the-lens metering measures the light that comes through the camera lens, thus eliminating much of the potential for error inherent in separate light meters. It is of particular advantage with long telephoto lenses, macro photography, and photomicrography. The first SLRs with through-the-lens metering were introduced by Japanese manufacturers in the early to mid-1960s.

=== Nikon F and F2 with interchangeable photomic prisms ===
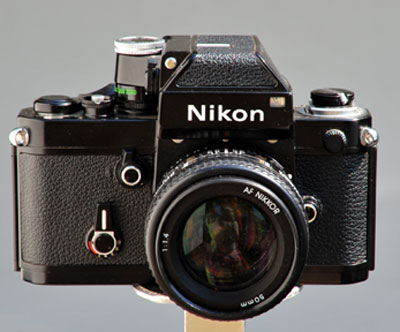
Nikon F2 Photomic and interchangeable pentaprism

The Nikon F was delivered since 1962 with various pentaprism metering heads. The Photomic series of prisms, which was initially designed with a direct coupled-metering CdS photocell (2 models were produced). The Photomic prism head later evolved to include the Photomic T with TTL in 1965, a behind-the-lens metering prism head which metered an averaging pattern of the focusing screen. The later center-area reading Photomic Tn, concentrated 60% of its sensitivity in the central portion of the focusing screen and the remaining 40% for the outlying screen area. The Photomic FTn was the last of the Photomic finders for the Nikon F.

In 1972, the Nikon F2 was introduced. It had a more streamlined body, a better mirror-locking system, a top shutter speed of 1/2000 of a second and was introduced with its own proprietary, continually improving Photomic meter prism heads. This camera's construction was mechanically superior to the F, with some models using titanium for the top and bottom cover plates, and featured slower shutter speeds via the self-timer mechanism. All Nikon F and F2 Photomic prism heads coupled to the shutter speed dial of the respective camera, and also to the aperture ring via a coupling prong on the diaphragm ring of the lens. This design feature was incorporated into most Auto Nikkor lenses of that time. Nikon technicians can still install a coupling prong on D type Auto Nikkor lenses so that these newer lenses will fully couple and operate with the older Nikon camera bodies. This is not possible with the G type Auto Nikkor lenses and lenses with the DX designation.

=== Pentax – the Spotmatic ===
Pentax was the first manufacturer to show a prototype camera with a behind-the-lens spot metering CdS meter system in 1961, the Pentax Spotmatic. Production Spotmatics, however, didn't appear until mid-to-late 1964, and these models were featured with an averaging meter system.

=== Topcon – the RE Super ===
Tokyo kogaku Optical's Topcon RE Super (Beseler Topcon Super D in the US), however, preceded Pentax into production in 1963. Topcon cameras used behind-the-lens in body, open aperature CdS (Cadmium Sulfide Cells) light meters which were integrated into an etched line total area of the silvered area of the mirror. Lines were calculated to balance sky and foreground exposure values by their spaces and patterns. The system was chain connected to the ASA dial, shutter speed and f:stops. The system was patented by Toshiba/Topcon. For 1963 this was a giant leap forward.

=== Minolta – the SRT-101 with contrast light compensation ===
Japanese-made SLRs from the mid-1960s (1966) included the Minolta SRT-101, and later the SRT-202 and 303 models, which used Minolta's own version of behind-the-lens metering which they referred to as CLC (contrast light compensation).

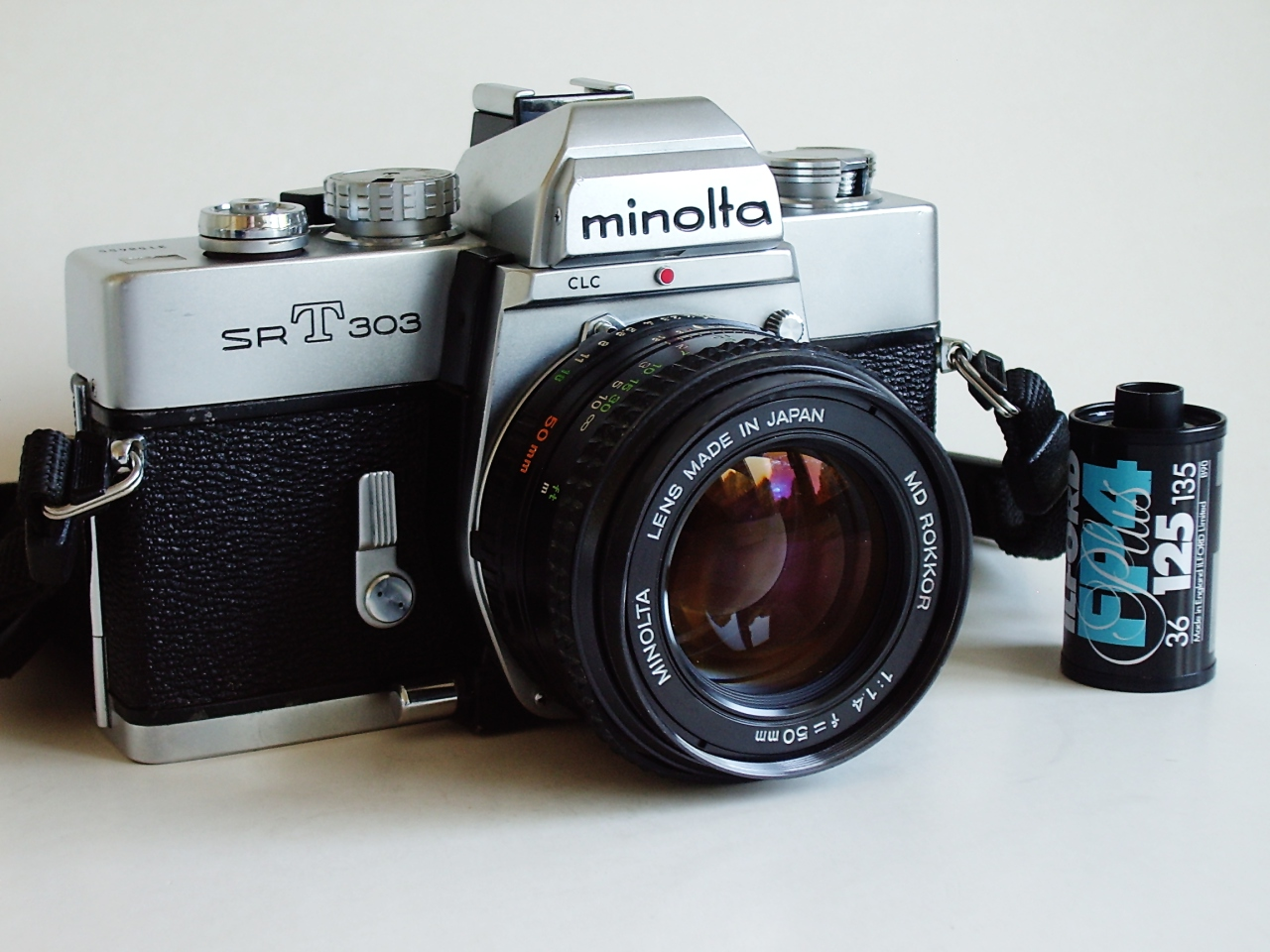
Minolta SRT303

=== Miranda and other camera manufacturers ===
Other camera manufacturers followed with their own behind-the-lens meter camera designs in order to compete in the marketplace. 35mm SLR film cameras such as Miranda with their Miranda Sensomat, unlike most other systems used a behind-the-lens meter system built into the pentaprism itself. Other Miranda 35mm SLR cameras could be adapted to behind-the-lens capability through the use of a separate pentaprism which included coupled or non-coupled built-in CdS meters. Miranda had a second lens system, consisting of the Sensorex models which had an externally coupled auto diaphragm. Sensorex camera bodies had built-in meters and these evolved to include TTL and 'EE' capability.

== The 1970s – improvements in design, light metering and automation ==
=== Design ===
One of the most significant designs of the seventies for the 35mm SLR camera industry was the introduction of the Olympus OM-1 in 1973. After experiencing success with their small Olympus Pen half-frame cameras, particularly with their half-frame SLR-based Olympus Pen-F, Pen-Ft and Pen-FV cameras, Olympus set out with its chief designer Yoshihisa Maitani to later create a compact SLR—the M-1—with new compact lenses and a large bayonet mount that could accept almost any SLR design optic. Shortly after being launched the camera was renamed the OM-1 to avoid a trademark conflict with Leica. The mechanical, manual OM-1 was significantly smaller and lighter than contemporary SLRs, but no less functional. The camera was supported by one of the most comprehensive 35 mm SLR lens and accessory systems available. Maitani decreased the size and weight by totally redesigning the SLR from the ground up with unprecedented use of metallurgy, which included repositioning the shutter speed selector to the front of the lens mount, instead of a more conventional position on top of the body.

=== 'Off-the-film' electronic flash metering ===
==== Olympus – the OM-2 ====
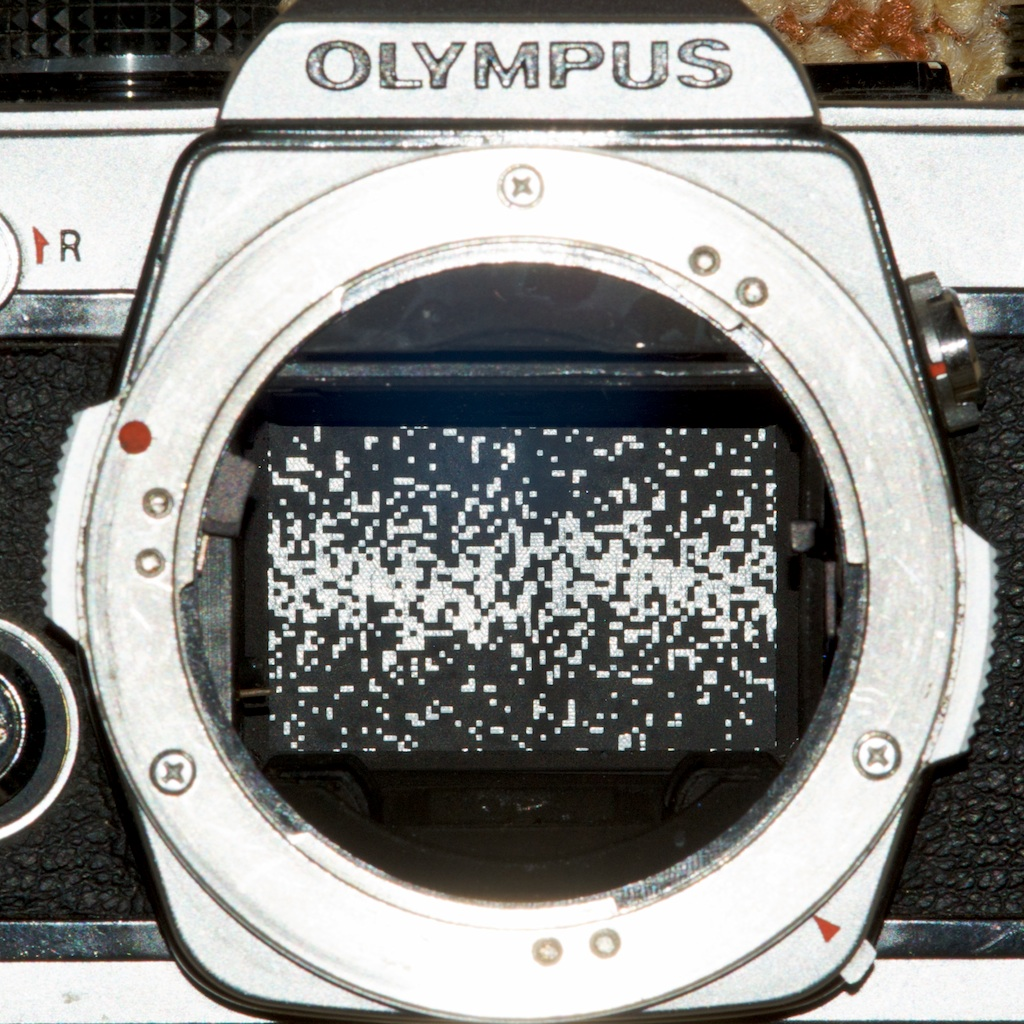
The OTF system of the OM2 (click for explanation)

Olympus made another significant advance with the OM-2 in 1975, featuring aperture-priority automatic exposure with the world's first off-the-film plane available-light metering and off-the-film (which Olympus referred to as 'OTF') flash metering systems. By metering light in real time off the film plane the OM-2 was able to adjust exposure if light levels changed during exposure. By eliminating flash metering via a built-in photocell on a flash unit the OTF system was able to meter more accurately, and also significantly simplify multi-flash shooting as it was no longer necessary to calculate and factor-in exposure for multiple light sources. This system was especially valuable in photomacrography (macrophotography) and photomicrography (microphotography).

The Olympus OM System was further enlarged; its Zuiko lenses gained a reputation as being among the sharpest lenses in the world, and in the 1980s, Olympus added further improvements by replacing the OM-1 and OM-2 cameras with the OM-3, a mechanical manual SLR and the OM-4 automatic, both of which featured multi-spot metering capabilities. These cameras were further improved into the last of the OM SLRs, the titanium-bodied OM-3Ti and OM-4Ti, introducing at the same time, the world's fastest electronic flash synchronization speeds, at 1/2000 second with their new Full-Synchro strobe-based flash technology.

Gradually, other manufacturers incorporated this feature into their own SLR camera designs.

=== Programmed autoexposure ===
By 1974, the autoexposure SLR brands had aligned into two camps (shutter-priority: Canon, Konica, Miranda, Petri, Ricoh and Topcon; aperture-priority: Asahi Pentax, Chinon, Cosina, Fujica, Minolta, Nikkormat and Yashica) supposedly based on the superiority of their chosen mode. (In reality, based on the limitations of the electronics of the time and the ease of adapting each brand's older mechanical designs to automation.) These AE SLRs were only semi-automatic. With shutter-priority control, the camera would set the lens aperture after the photographer chose a shutter speed to freeze or blur motion. With aperture-priority control, the camera would set the shutter speed after the photographer chose a lens aperture f-stop to control depth of field (focus).

==== Canon – the A-1 ====
Perhaps the most significant milestone of the 1970s era of SLR computerization was the 1978 release of the Canon A-1, the first SLR with a "programmed" autoexposure mode. Although the Minolta XD11 was the first SLR to offer both aperture-priority and shutter-priority modes in 1977, it was not until the next year that the A-1 came out with a microprocessor computer powerful enough to offer both of those modes and add the ability to automatically set both the shutter speed and lens aperture in a compromise exposure from light meter input.

Programmed autoexposure, in many variations, became a standard camera feature by the mid-1980s. This is the order of first introduction of 35 mm SLRs, by brand, with a computer programmed autoexposure mode, before the rise of autofocus (see next section): 1978, Canon A-1 (plus AE-1 Program, 1981 and T50, 1983); 1980, Fujica AX-5; 1980, Leica R4; 1981, Mamiya ZE-X; 1982, Konica FP-1; 1982, Minolta X-700; 1982, Nikon FG (plus FA, 1983); 1983, Pentax Super Program (plus Program Plus, 1984 and A3000, 1985); 1983, Chinon CP-5 Twin Program (also first with two program modes); 1984, Ricoh XR-P (tied with Canon T70 as first with three program modes); 1985, Olympus OM-2S Program; 1985, Contax 159MM; 1985, Yashica FX-103. Of the brands active in the mid-1970s, Cosina, Miranda, Petri, Praktica, Rolleiflex, Topcon and Zenit never introduced programmed 35 mm SLRs; usually the inability to make the transition forced the company to quit the 35 mm SLR business altogether. Note that the Asahi Pentax Auto 110, Pentax Auto 110 Super (Pocket Instamatic 110 SLRs from 1978 and 1982) and Pentax 645 (a 645 format SLR from 1985) also had programmed autoexposure.

== Autofocus revolution ==
Autofocus compact cameras had been introduced in the late 1970s. The SLR market of the time was crowded, and autofocus seemed an excellent option to attract novice photographers.

The first autofocus SLR was the 1978 Polaroid SX-70 SONAR OneStep. It utilized an autofocus system based on sonar technology that gauges the camera-to-subject distance using ultrasonic sound waves.

The first 35 mm SLR (the SX-70 was not 35 mm) with autofocus capability was the Pentax ME F of 1981 (using a special autofocus lens with an integral motor).

In 1981 Canon introduced a self-contained autofocus lens, the 35–70 mm AF, which contained an optical triangulation system that would focus the lens on the subject in the exact center when a button on the side of the lens was pushed. It would work on any Canon FD camera body. Nikon's F3AF was a highly specialized autofocus camera. It was a variant of the Nikon F3 that worked with the full range of Nikon manual focus lenses, but also featured two dedicated AF lenses (an 80 mm and a 200 mm) that coupled with a special AF viewfinder. F3AF lenses were only supported by the F3AF, the F501, and the F4. Nikon's later AF cameras and lenses used an entirely different design.

These cameras, and other experiments in autofocus from other manufacturers, had limited success.

=== Minolta – the Maxxum 7000 ===
Minolta 7000
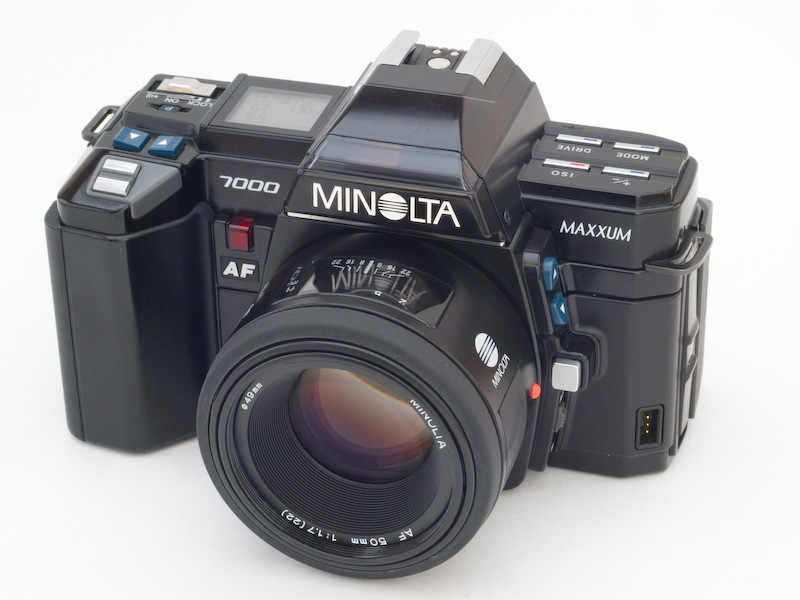

Overview
- Type: 35mm SLR

Lens
- Lens mount: Minolta A-mount

Focusing
- Focus: TTL phase detecting autofocus

Exposure/metering
- Exposure: Program, Aperture priority, Shutter priority and depth-of-field autoexposure; match-needle manual 6 zone evaluative or 6.5% partial metering

Flash
- Flash: Dedicated Hot shoe synchronization only

The first true 35mm SLR autofocus camera that had a successful design was the Minolta Dynax/Maxxum 7000, introduced in 1985. This SLR featured a built-in motor drive and dedicated flash capability. Minolta also introduced a completely new bayonet mount lens system, the Maxxum AF lens system (currently known as the Sony A-Mount), which was incompatible with its previous MD-bayonet mount system, in which the lenses' focusing action was driven from a motor in the camera body. This reduced complexity in the camera body and the lens. Canon responded with the T80 and a range of three motor-equipped AC lenses, but this was regarded as a stopgap move. Nikon introduced the N2020 (known in Europe as the Nikon F-501), which was their first SLR with built-in autofocus motor, and redesigned autofocus Auto Nikkor lenses. Nikon's AF lenses, however, remained compatible with older Nikon 35mm SLR cameras, and older manual focus Nikon lenses could be used with varying degrees of compatibility on the new AF cameras.

=== Canon – the new EOS System ===
In 1987, Canon followed Minolta in introducing a new lens-mount system, which was incompatible with their previous mount-system: EOS, the Electro-Optical System. Unlike Minolta's motor-in-body approach, this design located the motor within the lens. New, more compact motor designs meant that both focus and aperture could be driven electrically without motor bulges in the lens. The Canon EF lens mount has no mechanical linkages; all communication between body and lens is electronic.

=== Nikon and Pentax ===
Nikon and Pentax both chose to extend their existing lens mounts with autofocus capability, retaining the ability to use older manual-focus lenses with an autofocus body, and driving the lens focus mechanism with a motor inside the camera. Later, Nikon added Silent Wave Motor (SWM) mechanisms into its lenses, supporting both focusing schemes until the introductions of the entry-level Nikon D40 and Nikon D40X in 2006. Pentax introduced its Supersonic Drive Motor (SDM) in 2006 with Pentax K10D model and two lenses (DA*16-50/2.8 AL ED [IF] SDM and DA*50-135/2.8 ED [IF] SDM). Since then all Pentax DSLR support both SDM and the motor inside the body. Earlier SDM lenses support both systems as well. The first SDM lens that did not support the old focusing system was the DA 17-70/4 AL [IF] SDM (2008).

== Consolidation to autofocus and the transition to digital photography ==
The major 35mm camera manufacturers, Canon, Minolta, Nikon, and Pentax were among the few companies to transition successfully to autofocus. Other camera manufacturers also introduced functionally successful autofocus SLRs but these cameras were not as successful. Some manufacturers eventually withdrew from the SLR market.

Nikon marketed its manual-focus SLR, the FM10, until 2020. Olympus continued production of its OM system camera line until 2002. Pentax also continued to produce the manual-focus LX until 2001. Sigma and Fujifilm also managed to continue manufacturing cameras, although Kyocera ended production in 2005 of its (Contax) camera systems. The newly formed Konica Minolta sold its camera business to Sony two years later.

=== Arrival of digital photography ===
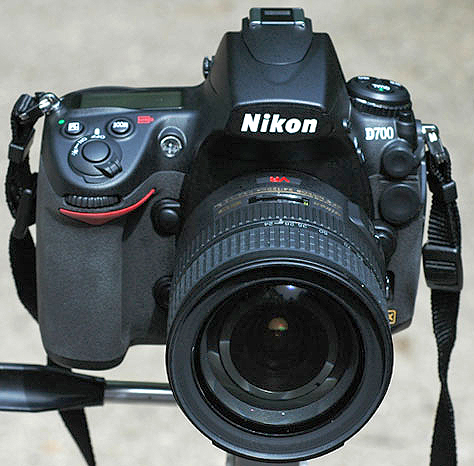
Nikon's D700 full-frame DSLR

In the 2000s, film became supplanted by digital photography, which had a huge impact on all camera manufacturers, including the SLR market. Nikon, for instance, ceased production of all film SLRs except for its flagship 35 mm SLR film camera, the F6; and the introductory-level Nikon FM10.

Replacing film with a similar-sized digital sensor is possible, but expensive because larger sensor areas imply a greater probability that a defect will render the sensor non-functional. Such "full frame" sensor digital SLRs (DSLRs) however gained early popularity with professional photographers who could both justify their initial high cost, and retain the use of their investment in expensive 35 mm film lenses. By 2008, full-frame models such the Canon EOS 1Ds and 5D, the Nikon D3 and D700, and the Sony Alpha 850 and Alpha A900, designed and priced for professionals, were available.

As of 2017, several manufacturers have introduced more affordable 35 mm sensor SLRs such as the Canon EOS 6D, the Nikon D610 and the new Pentax K-1. These cameras, while still positioned as premium products, all retail for less than $3000; significantly, all but the K-1 are priced below the manufacturer's top APS-C camera. In addition, the full-frame format is now found in Sony's MILC cameras and high-end fixed prime lens compacts, as well as Leica's M-mount digital rangefinders.

SLRs designed for amateurs and consumers generally use APS-C sensors, which are significantly smaller than 35 mm film frames and these require either their own specialist lenses or accepting a change in equivalent focal length and field-of-view angle when using lenses designed for the 35 mm format (wide-angle lenses become normal, normal become short telephoto, etc.).

During most of the 2000s, Panasonic and Olympus also marketed SLRs built around the now-defunct Four-Thirds System, which was even smaller.

== Medium-format SLRs ==
While twin-lens reflex cameras have been more numerous in the medium format film category, many medium-format SLRs had been (and some still are) produced. Hasselblad of Sweden has one of the best-known camera systems utilizing 120 and 220 film to produce 6 cm × 6 cm (2 1/4" × 2 1/4") negatives. They also produce other film backs which produce a 6 cm × 4.5 cm image; a back which uses 70mm roll film, a Polaroid Back for instant 'proofs' and even a 35mm film back.

Pentax produces two medium-format SLR systems, the Pentax 645, which produces a 6 cm × 4.5 cm image; and the Pentax 67 series, which system evolved from the late 1960s introduced Pentax 6 × 7 camera. These Pentax 6 × 7 series cameras resembled huge 35mm SLR camera in look and function. In 2010 Pentax introduced a digital version of the 645, the 645D, with a Kodak-built 44X33 sensor.

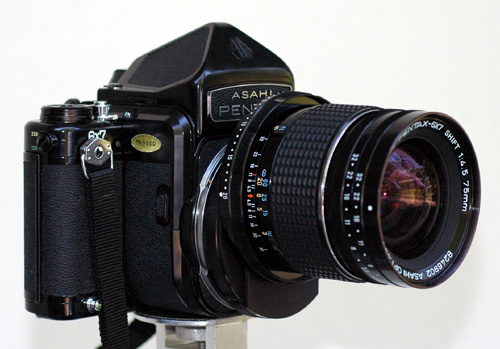
Pentax Medium Format 6×7 SLR from the 1980s. Used 120/220 roll film and featured an electronically timed focal plane shutter and interchangeable lenses and prisms. Shown here with shift-lens

Bronica (which has discontinued camera production), Fuji, Kyocera (which has also ceased production of their Contax cameras), Mamiya, Rollei, Pentacon (former East Germany), and Kiev (former Soviet Union) have also produced Medium Format SLR systems for a considerable period of time. Mamiya produces what is termed a medium format digital SLR. Other medium-format SLRs, such as those from Hasselblad, accept digital backs in place of film rolls or cartridges, effectively converting their film designs to digital format use.

In the case of Polaroid Corporation with its instant film line, the introduction of the Polaroid SX-70 was one of the few SLRs produced that was a rare case of a folding SLR.

== Future ==
The vast majority of SLRs now sold are digital models, even though their size, form factor, and other design elements remain derived from their 35 mm film predecessors. With the rise of mirrorless cameras, which allow smaller and lighter camera designs than their single-lens reflex counterparts, the SLR market has shrunk significantly; the majority of SLR camera manufacturers have either fully committed to mirrorless camera systems or exited the system camera market entirely.

== Chronology ==
Significant SLR technology firsts (including optics peculiar to SLRs and important SLR evolutionary lines now extinct).

=== Pre-19th century ===
1676
Johann Sturm (Germany) described first known use of a reflex mirror in a camera obscura. The camera obscura was known to Aristotle as an aid in observing solar eclipses, but its use as an artist's aid was first expounded by Giambattista della Porta (Italy) in 1558. The reflex mirror corrected the up-down image reversal that could make using a non-SLR camera obscura disconcerting – but not the left-right reversal.
1685
Johann Zahn (Germany) developed a portable SLR camera obscura with focusable lens, adjustable aperture and translucent viewing screen. These are all the core elements in a modern SLR photographic camera – except for an image capture medium. It would not be until 1826/27 before Joseph Nicéphore Niépce (France) made the first permanent photograph using a bitumen photosensitized pewter plate in a non-SLR camera. All advances in photographic technology since then – mechanical, optical, chemical or electronic – have been convenience or quality improvements only.
18th century
SLR camera obscuras popular as drawing aids. Artist can trace over the ground glass image to produce a true-life realistic picture.

=== 19th century ===
1861
Thomas Sutton (UK) received first patent for SLR photographic camera. An unknown number made but very few; no known production model; no known surviving examples. The manually levered reflex mirror also served as the camera's shutter. Used glass plates.
1884
Calvin Rae Smith Monocular Duplex (USA): first known production SLR. Used glass plates (original model 3 1/4×4 1/4 inch, later 4×5 inch); many were adapted to use Eastman sheet film. Large-format glass plate or sheet film SLRs were the dominant SLR type until circa 1915. However, SLRs themselves were not commonplace until the 1930s. The Duplex's name was a reference to the SLR's one lens performing both viewing and imaging duties, in contrast to the two separate viewing and imaging lenses of the twin lens cameras (first production 1882 [Marion Academy; UK]; not necessarily twin-lens reflex [TLR] camera, invented 1880 [one-of-a-kind Whipple-Beck camera; UK]) popular in the 1880s and 90s.
1891
Bram Loman Reflex Camera (Netherlands): first focal-plane shutter SLR. Had mirror rise synchronized with the release of a roller blind shutter, with speeds from 1/2 to 1/250 second, internally mounted in front of the focal plane, instead of the previously normal unsynchronized, external accessory in front of the lens. An internal camera-mounted traveling-slit FP shutter's main advantage over the competing interlens leaf shutter was the ability to use a very narrow slit to offer up to an action-stopping 1/1000 second shutter speed at a time when leaf shutters topped out at 1/250 sec. – although the available contemporaneous ISO 1 to 3 equivalent speed emulsions limited the opportunities to use the high speeds.

=== Early 20th century ===
1903
Folmer & Schwing Stereo Graflex (USA): first (and only) stereo SLR. Strictly speaking, the Stereo Graflex was not a "single"-lens reflex camera, because, as a stereo camera, it had two imaging lenses. However, it had a reflex mirror and a typical for the era leather "chimney"-hooded waist level finder, albeit with dual eyepiece magnifiers. It took 5×7-inch glass dry plates.
1907
Folmer & Schwing Graflex No. 1A (USA): first medium format roll film SLR. Took eight exposures of 2 1/2×4 1/2 inch frames on 116 roll film. Had folding waist level finder and focal-plane shutter. A sister SLR camera, the Graflex No. 3A, was released at about the same time. It took six 3 1/4×5 1/2 inch "postcard" frames on 122 roll film. Roll film (usually 120 type) SLRs became the dominant SLR type in the 1930s. The various models of large and medium format Graflex SLRs made beginning in 1898, and culminating in the 4×5 inch sheet film Graflex Super D of 1948, are the best and most famous American-made SLRs, if only for the shortage of competition. Graflex quit the camera business in 1973. A-127 is the rarest and most valuable at 1254 dollars – 3400 dollars
1925
Ernemann (merged into Zeiss Ikon, 1926) Ermanox Reflex (Germany): first SLR with high speed lens (10.5 cm f/1.8 or 85mm f/1.8 Ernostar). Established SLR as viable photojournalist's available-light camera. Had folding waist level finder and focal-plane shutter. Used 4.5×6 cm glass plates or sheet film; adaptable to roll film.

=== 1930s ===
1933
Ihagee VP Exakta (Germany): first 127 roll film SLR. Preliminary designs were on paper by June 1932. Took eight exposures of 4×6.5 cm (1 5/8×2 1/2 inch) nominal frames (40×62 mm actual frames) on 127 "Vest Pocket" roll film, and had a folding waist level finder and focal-plane shutter. The 1935 version was the first camera with a built-in flash synchronization socket (called Vacublitz) to automatically synchronize the recently invented flashbulb (first marketed as Vacublitz in 1929) with its shutter. The VP also established the oblong body shape and handling soon to be standard in 35 mm SLRs except that Exakta SLRs had primarily left-handed controls and were more trapezoidal shaped than rectangular.
1934
Eichapfel Noviflex (Germany): first 2 1/4 square format, medium format roll film SLR. Took twelve exposures of 6×6 cm (2 1/4×2 1/4 inch) frames on 120 roll film. Also had a fixed lens and focal-plane shutter. The 1937 version had interchangeable lenses. The square frame format precluded the awkward manipulations needed to take a vertical photograph with horizontal rectangular format SLRs having then standard waist-level viewfinders. The Noviflex was not commercially successful; it was the Franz Kochmann Reflex-Korelle (Germany) of 1935 that established the popularity of the 2 1/4 square format SLR.
1935
135 film, commonly called 35 mm film, introduced by Kodak (USA). Was (and is) 35 mm nominal width (1 3/8 inch actual width), acetate base, double perforated film, pre-loaded into felt-lipped, daylight-loading cartridges ready-to-use for still cameras. Originally intended for Kodak Retina, Zeiss Ikon Contax and E. Leitz Leica 35 mm rangefinder cameras. Previously, bulk rolls of 35 mm motion picture film would need to be user cut and loaded, in complete darkness, into camera specific cartridges or magazines. The September 1936 release of Kodachrome (the first high speed [ISO 8 equivalent], realistic color film) in standardized 135 format (but not medium format roll film) spurred explosive growth in the popularity of all types of miniature format 35 mm cameras. The vast majority were not high-end SLRs or RFs, but basic amateur RFs such as the nearly three million selling Argus C3 (USA) of 1939. Originally, each US$3.50 (including processing) Kodachrome cartridge gave eighteen exposures if the camera used the 24×36 mm frame size (double the frame size of 35 mm cine cameras) established by the Multi-Speed Shutter Co. Simplex (USA) camera of 1914 and popularized by the E. Leitz Leica A (Germany) of 1925. The 24×36 mm frame size did not become the universal standard frame size until the early 1950s. Note that 135 film cameras using non-standard frame sizes, such as 24×18 mm or 24×24 mm, continued to be made into the early 1990s. Panoramic 135 film cameras using extra-wide aspect ratio frame sizes (up to 24×160 mm for the 360° revolving slit Globuscope [USA] of 1981) were still available in 2006.

The Sport (camera) is the series production model of a prototype camera called Gelveta. The Gelveta was designed and built by A. O. Gelgar between 1934 and 1935. It is the earliest known 35mm SLR camera ever to be built, but fewer than 200 examples were made. It was manufactured by the Soviet camera factory Gosudarstvennyi Optiko-Mekhanicheskii Zavod, The State Optical-Mechanical Factory in Leningrad. GOMZ for short. The camera name is engraved in Cyrillic on the finder housing above the lens: „Спорт". The manufacturer's prism logo in gold on black with the factory initials ГОМЗ (GOMZ) is shown behind a circular magnifying window on the top left camera front. An estimated number of 16,000 cameras were made

1936
Ihagee Kine Exakta (Germany): first production 35 mm SLR, first system SLR, first interchangeable lens camera with bayonet lens mount. This was exhibited at the Leipzig Spring Fair in March and was in production by April 1936. Had left-handed shutter release and rapid film wind thumb lever, folding waist level finder and 12 to 1/1000 second focal-plane shutter. Well-integrated design with excellent interchangeable lenses and good accessory system. Fewer than 30,000 Kine Exaktas were made before World War 2 stopped production in 1940. Production of improved models re-started after the war and Exakta was among the best known 35 mm SLR brands through the 50s.
1936
E. Leitz PLOOT (Germany): first reflex housing for 35 mm rangefinder cameras. For use with a Leica IIIa RF and the Leitz 20 cm f/4.5 Telyt or 40 cm f/5 Telyt long focus lenses (all Germany). Long focus (and telephoto) lenses have very shallow depth of field and the short baseline rangefinders built into RF cameras cannot triangulate the subject distance accurately enough for acceptably sharp focusing. SLRs do not suffer from this problem, because they are focused by directly assessing the sharpness of the lens image – the lens serves as its own rangefinder. Reflex housings converted RFs into very awkward SLRs by inserting a reflex mirror and focusing screen between the lens and camera. Some even had image reversing optics. They also solved the RF camera's parallax error problem in macrophotography. Eventually, real SLRs were recognized as the simpler solution and supplanted RFs in the 1960s. The last reflex housing for a film camera, the Leica Visoflex III (West Germany; for Leica M4 series RFs), was discontinued in 1984.
1937
Gosudarstevennyi Optiko-Mekhanichesky Zavod (GOMZ) Sport (Спорт; Soviet Union): a 35 mm (not 135 type) SLR apparently prototyped in 1935. However, sources are uncertain or conflict upon the Sport's introduction date – a plurality say 1937. If it was sold in 1935, it would be the first 35 mm SLR. In any event, the Sport was not widely available and had no influence on later SLRs.

=== 1940s ===
1947
Gamma Duflex (Hungary): first instant return mirror SLR, first metal focal-plane shutter SLR, first internal semi-automatic lens diaphragm SLR. Also had a mirror "prism" viewfinder, an intermediate step to a solid pentaprism. Reflex mirrors coupled to the shutter release had been spring actuated to rise automatically since the 19th century, but the viewfinder would remain blacked-out until the mirror was manually cocked back down. With an automatic, instant return mirror, the viewfinder blackout time might be as short as 1/8th second. The semi-auto diaphragm closed the lens diaphragm with shutter release, but it needed to be manually re-cocked open. The Duflex was very ambitious but very unreliable and Gamma's first and last production SLR.
1947
Rectaflex (Italy): first SLR camera equipped with a pentaprism for eye-level viewing. The first prototype of the Rectaflex was presented by Telemaco Corsi at the Milano Fair in April 1947. It was a wooden mock-up, with a mirror eye-level finder. This first prototype used a five-facet roof optic prism giving a left to right inverted image. For vertical pictures, the image was upside down, and that was a big drawback. This was corrected with a Goulier prism before the 1948 Milano Fair.
1948
Hasselblad 1600F (Sweden): first 2 1/4 medium format system SLR suitable for professional use. Took twelve exposures of 2 1/4×2 1/4 inch (6×6 cm) nominal frames (56×56 mm actual frames) on 120 film. Had modular design accepting interchangeable lenses, film magazines and folding waist level finder. The 1/1600 second corrugated stainless steel focal-plane shutter was unreliable and was replaced by a slower but more reliable 1/1000 second focal-plane shutter in the Hasselblad 1000F (Sweden) of 1952.
1948
Telemaco Corsi from Rome shows world's first working Pentaprism SLR, Italian Rectaflex, at Milano Fair in April. Production of preseries Standard 947 model starts in June. Series production of model A 1000 starts in September. Alpa Prisma Reflex (Switzerland) had a pentaprism viewfinder in 1948, but its eyepiece was angled upward at 45°.
1949
VEB Zeiss Ikon (Dresden) Contax S (East Germany): second pentaprism eyelevel viewing 35 mm SLR. First M42 screw mount camera. (The East German KW Praktica came out at about the same time.) With earlier "waist level" SLR viewfinder systems (in which the photographer looks downward at the reflex mirror's image on the focusing screen), moving subjects are seen to track across the field-of-view in reverse direction of their actual motion, making action shooting counter-intuitive. A pentaprism is an eight-sided (only five are of significance; the other three are cut off corners) chunk of glass silvered on three sides that collects, redirects and re-reverses the light from the mirror with minimal light loss. With a proper pentaprism, all a photographer needs to do is hold the camera up to eyelevel and everything is there. The pentaprism SLR had first been proposed in the 19th century and was used in non-35 mm SLRs in the 1930s. Similar systems (or, in the 1990s, its cheaper alternative, the pentamirror) became so common in 35 mm SLRs by the late 1950s that it is the characteristic pentaprism "head" atop the camera body that defines the type for most people.

=== 1950s ===
1950
Ihagee Exakta Varex (East Germany; called Exakta V in USA): first interchangeable viewfinder, first interchangeable focusing screens, first viewfinder condenser lens SLR. Original viewfinder selection was waist-level or pentaprism. For the next half-century, interchangeable viewfinder customization was the signal feature of fully professional level SLRs, although they have not made the transition to digital SLRs.
1950
Angénieux 35mm f/2.5 Retrofocus Type R 1 (France): first retrofocus wide angle lens for 35 mm SLRs (for Exaktas). Regular wide angle lenses (meaning short focal length lenses) need to be mounted close to the film. However, SLRs require that lenses be mounted far enough in front of the film to provide space for the movement of the mirror – the "mirror box". Therefore, the focal length of early 35 mm SLR lenses were no less than about 40 mm. This prompted the development of wide view lenses with more complex retrofocus optical designs. These use very large negative front elements to force back-focus distances long enough to ensure clearance. Note, "retrofocus" was an Angénieux trademark before losing exclusive status. The original generic term is "inverted telephoto". A telephoto lens (multiple inventions, 1891) has a front positive group and rear negative group; retrofocus lenses have the negative group in front and positive group to the rear. The first inverted-telephoto imaging lens was the Taylor-Hobson 35mm f/2 (1931, UK) developed to provide back-focus clearance for the beamsplitter prism used by the full-color via three negative Technicolor motion picture process. Retrofocus wide angle prime lenses reached fields of view as wide as 118° with the Nikkor 13mm f/5.6 (Japan) lens for Nikon 35 mm SLRs in 1975, but they are extremely large compared to non-SLR short focal length lenses because of their gigantic negative elements.
1952
Zenit (Soviet Union, Russia; Зенит): first Russian pentaprism eyelevel viewing 35 mm SLR.
1952
Asahiflex I (Japan): first Japanese 35 mm SLR. Had folding waist level finder and focal-plane shutter. From 1952 to 1983, Asahi Optical (today called Pentax and owned by Ricoh) manufactured cameras exclusively of SLR type and has made them in the greatest variety of formats of any modern camera company – from 110 to 6×7 film, and today's digital.
1953
VEB Zeiss Ikon (Dresden) Contax E (East Germany): first built-in light meter SLR. Had an external selenium photoelectric cell mounted behind a door on the pentaprism housing, above the lens. The meter was uncoupled – the photographer would need to wait until the meter stabilized and manually set the shutter speed and lens aperture to match the indicated exposure reading. The first camera with a built-in meter (also uncoupled) was the Zeiss Ikon Contaflex (Germany) 35 mm twin-lens reflex (TLR) camera of 1935.
1953
Zeiss Ikon Contaflex I (West Germany): first leaf shutter 35 mm SLR. Had Synchro-Compur leaf shutter and front cell focusing 45mm f/2.8 Tessar lens, built-in selenium-coupled exposure meter. For many years, reliable focal-plane shutters were very expensive and SLRs equipped with Compur or Prontor leaf shutters were strong competitors. As FP shutters improved, their faster available speeds won out in the late 1960s and leaf shutter 35 mm SLRs disappeared around 1976.
1953
Metz/Kilfitt Mecaflex (West Germany): first (and only) square format 35 mm SLR. Took up to fifty exposures of 24×24 mm frames on 135 film. A compact Prontor leaf shutter design with bayonet mount interchangeable lenses. 135 film's standard 24×36 mm frame size is inefficient. Its 3:2 aspect ratio is too wide, recording only 59% of a required 43.3 mm diameter lens image circle. This makes lenses for the format overly large for the image area. A square 24×24 mm frame maximizes coverage at 64% of a smaller 33.9 mm image circle. The Mecaflex's designer, Heinz Kilfitt, also designed the Robot (Germany) of 1934, the first 24×24 mm 35 mm (not 135 type) camera. Both failed to disturb the entrenched rectangular format and the 3:2 ratio still dominates digital SLRs. Olympus' Four-Thirds System digital format of 2002 is the latest attempt at a narrower, albeit not square, format. Note that dual 24×24 mm frames on 135 film were used by the non-SLR David White Stereo Realist (USA, 1947), leader of the 1950s stereo photography fad.
1954
Asahiflex IIB (Japan; called Sears Tower 23 in USA): first SLR with reliable instant return mirror.
1954
Praktina FX (East Germany): first available spring powered motor drive accessory for SLR, first breech-lock lens mount.
1954
Tokiwa Seiki Firstflex 35 (Japan): first interchangeable lens, leaf shutter 35 mm SLR. Otherwise a wholly forgettable camera; cheaply made to low specifications and of poor quality, with waist level finder.
1955
Miranda T (Japan): first Japanese pentaprism eyelevel viewing 35 mm SLR. Note that the Tokiwa Seiki Pentaflex (Japan), a modified Firstflex 35 (see above), had an eyelevel viewfinder four months before the Miranda, but using a porroprism. Orion Seiki (company renamed Miranda Camera in 1956) produced a versatile SLR system in the 1960s, called by some "the poor man's Nikon," but was unable to keep up with the rapid advances in electronics of the 1970s and went bankrupt December 1976.
1955
Kilfitt 4 cm f/3.5 Makro-Kilar (West Germany/Liechtenstein): first close focusing "macro" lens for 35 mm SLRs (for Exaktas and others). Version D focused from infinity to 1:1 ratio (life-size) at two inches; version E, to 1:2 ratio (half life-size) at four inches. Because SLRs do not suffer from parallax error due to the offset between the taking lens and a viewfinder lens, they are far superior for close-up photography than cameras with other optical viewfinder systems (though the viewfinder screens on digital cameras also show the image as seen by the taking lens). Most SLR lens lines continue to include macro lenses optimized for high magnification, although their focal lengths tend to be longer than the original Makro-Kilar to allow more working distance. "Macro zoom" lenses began appearing in the 1970s, but traditionalists object to calling most of them macro because they usually do not focus closer than 1:4 ratio, with relatively poor image quality.
1955
Ihagee Exakta Varex worlds first 35mm SLR with external automatic diaphragm release on Meyer Primotar E 3,5/50
1956
Zeiss Ikon Contaflex III (West Germany): first high-quality, interchangeable lens attachments, leaf shutter 35 mm pentaprism SLR with built-in selenium exposure meter. Was improved Contaflex I (see above) with redesigned Carl Zeiss unit-focusing Tessar lens, its front element can be removed and replaced with a set of Pro-Tessar lenses.
1956
VEB Kamerawerkstätten, Dresden-Niedersedlitz PRAKTICA FX 2 worlds first 35mm SLR with internal automatic diaphragm release for Meyer Primotar E 3,5/50
1957
Asahi Pentax (Japan; called Sears Tower 26 in USA): first SLR with right-handed rapid-wind thumb lever, first fold-out film rewind crank, first microprism focusing aid. First Asahi SLR with M42 screw mount. Established the "modern" control layout of the 35 mm SLR. Well-integrated focal-plane shutter, instant return mirror and pentaprism design.
1957
Hasselblad 500C (Sweden): replaced the Hasselblad 1600F/1000F's (see above) problematic focal-plane shutter with reliable interlens Synchro-Compur leaf shutters and made the 2 1/4 medium format SLR the dominant professional studio camera by the late 1950s. Well-integrated, durable and reliable design without instant return mirror, but with excellent auto-diaphragm interchangeable lenses and large accessory system.
1958
Zunow SLR (Japan): first Japanese internal auto-diaphragm (Zunow-matic Diaphragm System) 35 mm SLR and lenses. Well-integrated focal-plane shutter, instant return mirror, pentaprism and auto-diaphragm design with excellent lenses and good accessory system. Stopping down (closing) the lens aperture (iris) to prepare for exposure transmits less light to the mirror and the viewfinder may become very dim – perhaps even too dark to see the image. Auto-diaphragms coupled to the shutter release that automatically stop down when the mirror swings up and reopen when the mirror comes down provides almost continuous fully open aperture viewing. Auto-diaphragm lenses and instant return mirror, focal-plane shutter SLRs require precise camera-to-lens linkage, but can choreograph the entire shutter-button release, close lens, raise mirror, open shutter, close shutter, lower mirror, open lens exposure sequence in as little as 1/8th second. Originally, these were mechanical spring/gear/lever systems energized concurrent with manually winding the film, but modern systems are electronically timed and operated by an electromagnet. The financially weak Zunow company was unable to capitalize on its design; few examples of the camera (and much fewer of the wide and tele lenses for it) were produced before the company switched back to lenses for other companies' cameras. Zunow went bankrupt in 1961. Note, the 1954 version of the Ihagee Exakta VX (East Germany) 35 mm SLR introduced an external auto-diaphragm lens system using a spring-loaded shutter button plunger connection rod.
1958
Voigtländer Bessamatic first leaf shutter 35mm SLR with a built-in light meter coupled to a viewfinder exposure control indicator – a galvanometer needle pointer.
1959
Zeiss Ikon Contarex (West Germany): first focal-plane shutter SLR with a built-in light meter coupled to a viewfinder exposure control indicator – a galvanometer needle pointer. It had an external, circular selenium photoelectric cell mounted above the lens; earning it "Bullseye" (in USA) and "Cyclops" (in UK) nicknames. For proper exposure, the photographer would adjust the meter, which was also coupled to the shutter speed and lens aperture, until the needle was centered on a mark. (The Carl Braun Paxette Reflex [West Germany] leaf shutter SLR had an external top mounted, coupled light meter needle system in 1958.) The Contarex also had interchangeable film backs, a feature common with medium format SLRs and used in a few 35 mm rangefinder cameras, but almost exclusive to Contarex/Contaflex series among 35 mm SLRs. Although Contarex SLRs and their Zeiss lenses were of extremely high quality, they were also extremely expensive and of idiosyncratic (even clumsy) handling.
1959
Nikon F (Japan): first pro caliber 35 mm system SLR, first electric motor drive accessory for SLR. (The Japanese Nikon SP 35 mm rangefinder camera had the first electric motor drive for any camera type in 1957.) Well-integrated, durable and reliable focal-plane shutter, instant return mirror, pentaprism and auto-diaphragm design with excellent interchangeable lenses and huge accessory system. Although the F was not technologically ground-breaking, it sold 862,600 units and made the 35 mm SLR the dominant professional miniature format camera (displacing the 35 mm RF) by the early 1960s. The perfection of the optical and mechanical formulae of the interchangeable lens SLR in the one-two punch of the Hasselblad 500C (see above) and Nikon F also ended the popularity of the medium format twin-lens reflex (TLR) camera (typified by the Franke & Heidecke Rolleiflex/Rolleicord series [Germany, later West Germany]) by the early 1960s. The F's improved successor, the Nikon F2 (Japan) of 1971, is widely regarded as the finest mechanically controlled 35 mm SLR camera ever made.
1959
Voigtländer–Zoomar 1:2.8 f=36mm–82mm (USA/West Germany): first zoom lens for 35 mm still cameras. Designed by Zoomar in USA and manufactured by Kilfitt in West Germany for Voigtländer. Originally mounted for Voigtländer Bessamatic series (West Germany) 35 mm leaf shutter SLRs, but later available in Exakta and other mounts. Zoom lenses and SLR film cameras are perfect for each other, because an SLR always shows what the lens is imaging during zooming, something difficult, if not impossible, to do with other optical viewfinder systems.

=== 1960s ===
1960
Konica F (Japan): first SLR with 1/2000 second and 1/125 second flash X-synchronization focal-plane shutter. Modern focal-plane shutters are dual curtain traveling slit shutters. They provide faster shutter speeds by timing the second shutter curtain to close sooner after the first curtain opens and narrowing the slit "wiping" the exposure on the film, instead of moving the curtains faster across film gate, because they are too fragile to survive the necessary accelerative shocks. Long wipe times can cause cartoonish distortion of very fast moving objects instead of truly freezing their motion. (The use of leaning in illustration to give the impression of speed is a caricature of the distortion caused by the slow wiping FP shutters of Graflex large format SLRs from the first half of the 20th century.) Unacceptable distortion (as well as difficulties in precisely timing very narrow slits) had stalled traditional cloth horizontal-travel FP shutters for 35 mm cameras at 1/1000 sec. and 1/60 sec. X-sync for decades. The F's Hi-Synchro shutter provided faster speeds by having its metal blades travel vertically, i.e. along the shorter side of the 24×36 mm frame. In 1982, the Nikon FM2 (Japan) reached 1/4000 sec. (and 1/200 sec. flash X-sync) with a vertical-travel FP shutter using honeycomb pattern etched titanium foil blades, stronger and lighter than plain stainless steel. This allowed quicker shutter-curtain travel time (3.6 milliseconds, about half of earlier vertical, metal bladed shutters) and thereby truly faster shutter speeds. The Nikon FE2 (Japan), with an improved version of this shutter, boosted X-sync speed to 1/250 sec. (3.3 ms curtain travel time) in 1983. The fastest FP shutter ever used in a film camera was the 1/12,000 sec. (1/300 sec. X-sync; 1.8 ms curtain travel time) duralumin and carbon fiber bladed one introduced by the Minolta Maxxum 9xi (Japan) in 1992.
1960
Royer Savoyflex Automatique (France): first autoexposure SLR. Had an unreliable mechanical shutter-priority autoexposure system controlled by an external selenium light meter, Prontor leaf shutter and fixed 50mm f/2.8 Som-Berthiot lens. The first autoexposure still camera was the non-SLR Kodak Super Kodak Six-20 (USA) of 1938 with a mechanical system controlling both aperture and shutter speed via trapped-needle method coupled to external selenium photoelectric cell.
1960
Krasnogorsky Mekhanichesky Zavod (KMZ) Narciss camera (Soviet Union; Нарцисс): first subminiature SLR. Took 14×21 mm frames on unperforated, specially spooled 16 mm film. Compact design with interchangeable lenses and removable finder. Subminiature film format cameras (those using smaller than 135 film) require a very high degree of enlargement to make even small 3 1/2×5 inch prints, magnifying image imperfections compared to larger formats; they are mostly used where the small camera size and weight are more important than image quality.
1961
35 mm f/3.5 PC-Nikkor lens — the first perspective control lens for a 35 mm camera, permitting control of perspective in architectural photography.
1962
Nikkorex Zoom 35 (Japan): first 35 mm SLR with fixed zoom lens (Zoom-Nikkor Auto 43–86mm f/3.5). Had non-pentaprism, four mirror reflex viewfinder and leaf shutter. Fixed lens SLRs have been an occasional phenomenon bridging simpler viewfinder cameras and more ambitious interchangeable lens SLRs. Presently, they are off-again with non-SLR electronic viewfinder (EVF) superzoom digital cameras occupying this market segment.
1963
Topcon RE Super (Japan; called Super D in USA; name became Super D worldwide in 1972): first SLR with through-the-lens (TTL) light meter for convenient exposure control. Had internal cadmium sulfide (CdS) photoresistive cells mounted behind non-silvered slits in the reflex mirror for coupled center-the-needle, open aperture, full area averaging metering with auto-diaphragm lenses. Film is rated at a particular "speed" sensitivity. It needs a specific amount of light to form an image. The Weston Universal 617 (USA) helped introduce light exposure metering by a handheld selenium photoelectric device to sense the ambient light in 1932, but miniature light meters built into the camera that gave TTL readings were a great leap forward in convenience introduced by the Feinwerk Technik Mec 16SB (West Germany) non-SLR subminiature (10×14 mm frames on 16 mm film) camera in 1960. TTL metering became normal in virtually all 35 mm SLRs by the late 1960s. The durable and rugged RE Super had excellent interchangeable Exakta mount lenses and was the only pro level 35 mm SLR to compete with the Nikon F (see above) with any success. However, Topcons never progressed and Tokyo Kogaku (or Tokyo Optical) quit the consumer camera business circa 1980.
1963
Olympus Pen F (Japan): first single frame (also called half frame) 35 mm SLR. Took up to 72 exposures of vertical 18×24 mm frames on 135 film. Had flat-topped non-pentaprism porroprism reflex and optical relay viewfinder, and rotary focal-plane shutter. Well-integrated compact design with excellent interchangeable lenses and large accessory system. The original non-SLR Olympus Pen (Japan) of 1959 helped give 35 mm still cameras that used the standard motion picture frame size of 35 mm film a burst of popularity. It ended by the late 1960s. Although single frame cameras used standard 135 film, single frame photofinishing was always special-order. Kyocera/Yashica unsuccessfully attempted to revive the format as "Double 35" with their Yashica Samurai series (Japan) SLRs in 1988.
1964
Asahi (Honeywell in USA) Pentax Spotmatic (Japan): second SLR with coupled center-the-needle TTL metering (stop-down aperture, full area averaging). Well-integrated, compact and reliable focal-plane shutter, instant return mirror and pentaprism design with excellent non-auto-diaphragm interchangeable lenses. Although the Spotmatic's stop-down (manual diaphragm lenses) system was less convenient than the RE Super's open aperture (auto-diaphragm lenses) system, the Spotmatic's two CdS cells on either side of the eyepiece reading off the focusing screen was less expensive and complex than the RE Super's system (see above), and thereby more popular. The Spotmatic's TTL system was (and is) very influential and widely imitated, often with open aperture. It (and rival TTL metering SLRs, including the Canon FT [1966; stop-down aperture, partial area], Minolta SRT101 [1966; open aperture, modified centerweighted] and Nikkormat FTN [1967; open aperture, centerweighted]; all from Japan) made the Japanese 35 mm SLR the dominant advanced amateur camera by the late 1960s.
1964
Krasnogorsky Mekhanichesky Zavod (KMZ) Zenit 5 (Soviet Union; Зенит 5): first SLR with built-in electric motor drive. Had a Ni-Cd battery powered motor for automatic single-frame film advance with a backup film wind knob. In 1970, the Minolta SRM (Japan) was the first SLR with built-in electric sequential motor drive and first SLR with auto film-rewind. It was a modified Minolta SRT101 with a permanently bottom-mounted motor drive (eight AA [LR6] batteries) and detachable handgrip for continuous three frames per second sequence shooting, but no light meter. Built-in motor drives did not become common in 35 mm SLRs until the mid-1980s when high-powered, energy efficient "coreless" micro-motors were perfected, but accessory drives or autowinders taking four to twelve AA (LR6) batteries were very popular in the 1970s. This is, of course, a non-issue in modern digital SLRs.
1964
Kodak Retina Reflex IV (USA/West Germany): first SLR with standard ISO hot shoe atop the pentaprism housing for direct flash mounting and synchronization. Was a 35 mm, leaf shutter design. A flash is a necessary accessory for auxiliary or fill light in dim or high contrast conditions. The first camera with any kind of hot shoe connector was the Univex Mercury (USA) non-SLR half frame 35 mm in 1938 and many post World War 2 non-SLRs (such as the Bell & Howell Foton [1948, USA] 35 mm rangefinder) had a Leica-type accessory shoe with added electrical contact (the present day ISO hot shoe). Although the Nikon F (see above) had a non-ISO hot shoe surrounding the film rewind crank in 1959, most 1960s 35 mm SLRs used screw-on accessory shoes attached to the eyepiece to mount flashes but a PC cable socket to sync them. The ISO hot shoe became a standard SLR feature in the early 1970s. However, in 1971, SLRs using "dedicated" electronic flashes with automatic flash exposure control began appearing with the Canon FTb (Japan). They used ISO-style shoes with extra electrical contacts. Each SLR brand used incompatible contact configurations and the time of use-any-flash-with-any-SLR passed by the late 1970s. Note, although the hot shoe had been de facto standardized in the 1950s, the International Organization for Standardization did not promulgate its ISO 518 hot shoe specification until 1977.
1965
Canon Pellix (Japan): first (really second after French Focaflex of 1959) pellicle reflex mirror SLR. Virtually all SLRs use fast-moving reflex mirrors that swivel out of the way to take the picture, causing mirror shock vibration, blacking-out the viewfinder and delaying shutter firing. Camera shake can blur the image and the subject (which might have moved) cannot be seen at the instant of exposure. A fixed semi-transparent pellicle reflex mirror, reflecting 30% of the light to the viewfinder and transmitting 70% to the film, prevents camera shake and viewfinder blackout, and reduces shutter lag time at the costs of a dimmer viewfinder image, longer exposure times and possible image quality loss. Modern instant return mirrors are fast enough and have efficient enough shock damping systems that the trade offs are not usually considered worthwhile. Pellicle mirror SLRs are very rare and are usually specialized designs for ultra-high speed (10+ frames per second) sequence shooting.
1966
Praktica Electronic (East Germany) first SLR with an electronically controlled shutter. Used electronic circuitry to time its focal-plane shutter instead of spring /gear/lever clockwork mechanisms.
1966
Konica Autorex (Japan; called AutoReflex in USA): first (really second after Soviet Russian Kiev 10 Automat of 1964) 35 mm SLR with successful shutter-priority automation (first with a focal-plane shutter). The camera also had the rare ability to allow selection between frame sizes (horizontal 24×36 mm or vertical 18×24 mm) between frames on the same roll of film. The camera used a mechanical "trap-needle" autoexposure system controlled by an external CdS meter that read light directly (not through-the-lens).
1967
Zeiss Ikon Contaflex 126 (West Germany): first Kodapak Instamatic 126 cartridge film SLR. Was a Voigtländer focal-plane shutter design unrelated to 35 mm Contaflexes (see above), accepting fully interchangeable lenses. Took up to twenty exposures of 28×28 mm frames on paper-backed, singly perforated, 35 mm wide film pre-threaded into double-ended cartridge with film supply and take-up spools. Drop-in loading 126 film was introduced by Kodak in 1963, solving the problem of amateurs' difficulty in loading 135 film manually. The 126 cartridge was an extremely popular non-SLR snapshot format for more than a decade, but began to fall victim to the increasing popularity of the 110 format throughout the 1970s.
1968
Konica Autoreflex T (Japan): first SLR with internal open aperture TTL metering autoexposure (mechanical shutter-priority). Was an improved Konica AutoReflex (see above) with internal CdS centerweighted light meter and reduced shutter button travel, but without half frame capability.
1968
OP Fisheye-Nikkor 10mm f/5.6 (Japan): first SLR lens with aspherical elements. Was a 180° orthographic projection fisheye lens for Nikon and Nikkormat 35 mm SLRs. Typical lens elements have spherically curved surfaces. However, this causes off-axis light to be focused closer to the lens than axial rays (spherical aberration) and degrading image sharpness; especially severe in very wide angle or aperture lenses. This can be prevented by using elements with convoluted aspheric curves. Although this was understood since the 17th century, the grinding of aspheric glass surfaces was extremely difficult and prevented their consumer use until the E. Leitz 50mm f/1.2 Noctilux (West Germany) in 1966; for Leica M-series 35 mm RFs. The Canon FD 55mm f/1.2 AL (Japan) of 1971 was the first rectilinear aspheric SLR lens; for FD mount Canon SLRs, and the Asahi SMC Takumar 15mm f/3.5 (Japan/West Germany) of 1975 was the first rectilinear aspheric wide angle SLR lens; for M42 screw mount Asahi Pentax SLRs (co-designed with Carl Zeiss [Oberkochen]). The use of modern precision molded plastic or glass aspheric lens elements has made aspheric lenses common today.
1969
Yashica TL Electro X (Japan): first SLR with all solid-state electronic light metering system. Had a stop-down aperture, full area averaging, CdS light meter linked via a four transistor circuit board to an extinguish-both-red-over-and-underexposure-lights exposure control system instead of a galvanometer meter needle. Also had another four transistor timing circuit to electronically control its metal-bladed Copal Square SE focal-plane shutter.
1969
Asahi (Honeywell in USA) Pentax 6×7 (Japan; name shortened to Pentax 67 in 1990): first 67 medium format SLR. Took ten exposures of 2 1/4×2 3/4 inch (6×7 cm) nominal frames (56×69.5 mm actual frames) on 120 film. The 67 format is called "perfect" or "ideal", because its aspect ratio enlarges to an 8×10 inch print without cropping. The Pentax 6×7 resembled a greatly scaled-up 35 mm SLR.

=== 1970s ===
1970
Mamiya RB67 (Japan): first 67 medium format system SLR. Took ten exposures of 2 1/4×2 3/4 inch (6×7 cm) nominal frames (56×69.5 mm actual frames) on 120 film. Also had "revolving" rotatable interchangeable film backs to easily take vertical photographs with the normally horizontal format and standard interchangeable waist level viewfinder.
1971
Asahi SMC Takumar lenses (Japan): first all multicoated (Super-Multi-Coated) lenses for consumer cameras; for M42 screw mount Asahi Pentax SLRs. Process co-developed with Carl Zeiss (Oberkochen, West Germany). Lenses with glass elements "single-coated" with a very thin layer (about 130–140 nanometers) of magnesium or calcium fluoride to suppress flare producing surface reflections were invented by Carl Zeiss (Jena, Germany) in 1936 and first sold in 1939. They became standard for high quality cameras by the early 1950s. Coating lenses with up to a dozen different layers of chemicals to suppress reflections across the visual spectrum (instead of at only one compromise wavelength) was a logical progression.
1971
Asahi Pentax Electro Spotmatic (Japan; name shortened to Asahi Pentax ES in 1972; called Honeywell Pentax ES in USA): first SLR with electronic aperture-priority (using stop-down TTL metering) autoexposure plus electronically controlled shutter. Earlier mechanical AE systems tended to be unreliable, but reliable and convenient AE systems (as well as other electronic control systems) that electronically set either the camera shutter speed or lens aperture from light meter readings once the other was manually set began with the Electro Spotmatic. Rival electronic AE SLRs included the Canon EF (1973; shutter priority), Minolta XE–7 (1975; aperture priority) and Nikkormat EL (1972; aperture priority), all from Japan. Electronic AE came to most 35 mm SLRs by the late 1970s. The Japanese electronic AE SLR effectively ended the German camera industry when they failed to keep up with their Japanese counterparts. After ailing throughout the 1960s, such famous nameplates as Contax, Exakta, Leica, Rollei and Voigtländer went bankrupt, were sold off, contracted production to East Asia, or became boutique brands in the 1970s.
1971
Praktica LLC (East Germany)(really December 1969): first interchangeable lens camera with electric contact lens mount, first camera with electromechanical lens diaphragm stopdown control. Had M42 screw mount modified for open aperture metering. The M42 mount was a very popular interchangeable lens mount system for a quarter century. It was used by almost two dozen different SLR brands, most notably Asahi Pentax. (Asahi became so closely associated with this mount that it was, and still is, often erroneously referred to as the Pentax screw mount.) However, by the early 1970s, the M42's limitations, especially no provision for auto-diaphragm lens open aperture viewing and metering, were becoming serious liabilities. After unpopular and uncoordinated attempts to modify the screw mount to support auto-diaphragm lenses with open aperture metering, Asahi abandoned the M42 screw mount in 1975, effectively ending production of this lens mounting system.
1971
Fujica ST701 (Japan): first SLR with silicon photodiode light meter sensors. Early SLR TTL meters used cadmium sulfide (CdS) cells (see Topcon RE Super and Asahi Pentax Spotmatic above), as they were the first sensors small enough to be internally mounted. However, CdS needed fairly bright light and suffered from a "memory" effect where it might take 30 seconds or more to respond to a light level change. Although silicon's infrared response required blue filtration to match the eye's spectral response, silicon supplanted CdS by the late 1970s because of its greater sensitivity and instantaneous response.
1972
Fujica ST801 (Japan): first SLR with viewfinder light emitting diodes. Had a seven LED dot scale to indicate extreme overexposure, +1 EV, +1/2 EV, 0 (correct exposure), –1/2 EV, −1 EV, extreme underexposure readings of its silicon photodiode light meter, instead of the traditional but delicate galvanometer needle pointer. A sister camera, the Fujica ST901 (Japan) of 1974, was the first SLR with a viewfinder LED digital data display. It had calculator-style LEDs showing camera's aperture priority autoexposure set shutter speeds from 20 to 1/1000 second in 14 nonstandard steps. Although they were replaced by more energy efficient and informative LCDs in the 1980s (see Nikon F3, below), the use of LEDs in the ST801/ST901 were major steps in the escalation of electronics in 1970s camera design
1972
Olympus OM-1 (Japan): first compact full-featured 35 mm SLR. At 83×136×50 mm and 510 g, it was about two-thirds the size and weight of most earlier 35 mm SLRs. Excellent mechanical design with excellent interchangeable lenses and large accessory system. Note that the initial production batches were marked as the M-1, but this designation was quickly changed when E. Leitz objected over conflicts with their Leica M-series RFs trademarks. M-1 marked cameras are currently a collector's item SLR.
1972
Polaroid SX-70 (USA): first instant film SLR. Had non-pentaprism mirror reflex system and electronic autoexposure in flat-folding body with bellows and fixed 116mm f/8 lens. Took ten exposure, 3 1/8×3 1/8 inch frame Polaroid SX-70 instant film packs. The principle of self-developing "instant photography" came to Edwin Land in 1943. The first production instant camera was the non-SLR Polaroid Land Model 95 (USA) of 1948, producing sepia-toned, peel-apart pictures. Steady improvements culminated in the seven-year, nearly quarter-billion dollar SX-70 camera and film project to create full-color, self-contained, develop-before-your-eyes, "garbage-free" prints.
1974
Vivitar Series 1 70–210mm f/3.5 (USA/Japan): first professional-level quality close focusing "macro" zoom lens for 35 mm SLRs. Early zoom lenses often had very inferior optical quality compared to prime lenses, but improvements in computer assisted zoom lens design and construction allowed annual Japanese 35 mm SLR zoom lens production to surpass prime lenses in 1982 and zooms became normal on virtually all but the highest end still cameras by the late 1980s. Ponder & Best's designed in the USA/made in Japan Vivitar Series 1 lenses were among the best available (many were the first of their kind) for about a dozen years, before new owners debased the brand.
1975
E. Leitz APO-Telyt-R 180mm f/3.4 (West Germany): first apochromatic lens for consumer cameras (Leicaflex series SLRs). The refractive index of glass increases from red to blue of the light spectrum (color dispersion). Blue is focused closer to the lens than red causing rainbow-like color fringing (chromatic aberration). Most photographic camera lenses are achromatically corrected to bring blue and red to a common focus – leaving large residual green and violet chromatic aberrations that degrades image sharpness; especially severe in long focus or telephoto lenses. If red, green and blue are brought to a common focus (plus other aberration corrections) with very little residual aberration, the lens is called apochromatic. Chromatic aberration was an issue at the dawn of photography (daguerreotypes [invented 1839] were blue sensitive only, while the human eye focused primarily using yellow), but apochromatic photographic lenses were considered unnecessary until the dominance of color film. The use of extra-low dispersion glasses made most 1980s professional telephotos and many 1990s amateur telephoto zooms apochromatic.
1975
Mamiya M645 (Japan): first 645 medium format system SLR. Took fifteen exposures of 2 1/4×1 5/8 inch (6×4.5 cm) nominal frames (56×41.5 mm actual frames) on 120 film. Mamiya was never successful at producing 35 mm SLRs, despite a half dozen attempts between 1959 and 1980. However, it was a leader in medium format cameras; first with the Mamiya C series (1956, Japan), the only successful interchangeable lens twin-lens reflex (TLR) cameras ever made, and then with the RB67 (see above) and M645 series SLRs.
1975
Olympus OM-2 (Japan): first SLR with TTL, off-the-film (OTF) flash autoexposure. Had two rearward-facing silicon photodiodes in the mirror box to meter light reflecting off the film. Circuitry could detect when enough light was exposed and automatically quench a specially "dedicated" accessory Olympus Quick Auto 310 electronic flash. Manual flash exposure control for a natural look is complex and convenient TTL autoflash metering became standard in virtually all SLRs by the mid-1980s.
1976
Canon AE-1 (Japan): first SLR with microprocessor electronics. Well-integrated and compact shutter-priority autoexposure design with excellent interchangeable lenses and large accessory system. Backed by a major advertising campaign, including celebrity endorsements, TV commercials and a catchy slogan ("So advanced, it's simple."), that targeted snapshooters, the AE-1 sold five million units and immediately made the 35 mm SLR an important mass-market camera. An improved model, the Canon AE-1 Program (Japan) of 1981, added another four million units to the tally.
1976
Asahi Pentax ME (Japan): first autoexposure-only SLR. Had aperture-priority exposure control only (photographer could not manually select a shutter speed) for simple snapshooter operation. Interchangeable lens autoexposure-only SLRs disappeared in the mid-1980s, because even snapshooters demanded that SLRs (as "good cameras") have a manual mode. However, most recent amateurs never use manual control and even some professionals depend on autoexposure, making the great majority of modern SLRs de facto autoexposure-only cameras.
1976
Minolta 110 Zoom SLR (Japan): first Pocket Instamatic 110 cartridge film SLR. Had built-in zoom lens (fixed 25–50mm f/4.5 Zoom Rokkor-Macro). Took up to 24 exposures of 13×17 mm frames on paper-backed, singly perforated, 16 mm wide film pre-threaded into double-ended cartridge with film supply and take-up spools. Compact, drop-in loading 110 film was introduced by Kodak in 1972. It was briefly an extremely popular non-SLR snapshot format but almost dead by 1982.
1977
Fujica AZ-1 (Japan): first interchangeable lens camera to be sold with a zoom lens as the primary lens. The AZ-1's Fujinon-Z 43-75mm f/3.5-4.5 zoom, despite its modest specifications, was the earliest attempt to supersede the 35 mm SLRs heretofore standard 50 to 58 mm "normal" prime lens with today's ubiquitous zoom lens. The regular Fujinon-Z 55mm f/1.8 lens remained a popular option. The AZ-1 was also one of the last Japanese-made M42 screw mount cameras released. The purchase of a zoom instead of a prime as the first lens became normal with virtually all amateur 35 mm SLRs in the latter 1980s.
1977
Minolta XD11 (Japan; called XD7 in Europe, XD in Japan): first dual mode autoexposure SLR. Had both aperture-priority and shutter-priority autoexposure. Previously, each AE SLR brand offered only one or the other mode, and aggressively touted their choice as superior to other. The XD11 offered both modes and trumped the debate.
1978
Canon A-1 (Japan): first SLR with an electronically controlled programmed autoexposure mode. Instead of the photographer picking a shutter speed to freeze or blur motion and choosing a lens aperture f-stop to control depth of field (focus), the A-1 had a microprocessor computer programmed to automatically select a compromise exposure from light meter input. Virtually all cameras had some sort of program mode or modes by the mid-1980s. It was also the first camera to have all four of the now standard PASM (program/aperture-priority/shutter-priority/manual) exposure modes. Canon's long term emphasis on the highest possible technology eventually allowed the company to dominate the 35 mm SLR market; first at the amateur level, with their AE-1 (see above) and A-1, and then (despite a stumble in the mid-1980s when they came late to autofocus) the professional level in the early 1990s with the Canon EOS-1 (Japan) of 1989. Canon remains the leading digital SLR maker, with a 38% worldwide market share in 2008.
1978
Polaroid SX-70 Sonar (USA): first electronic autofocus SLR. Had active ultrasonic sonar echo-location rangefinder AF system. This unique-to-Polaroid AF system had no influence on any other type of AF SLR. Took ten exposure, 3 1/8×3 1/8 inch frame, Polaroid Time-Zero SX-70 instant film packs.
1978
Asahi Pentax Auto 110 (Japan): first interchangeable lens Pocket Instamatic 110 film system SLR. Mini-35mm SLR-like programmed autoexposure design with good interchangeable lenses and large accessory system. Was the smallest and lightest SLR ever made – 56×99×45 mm, 185 g with Pentax-110 24mm f/2.8 lens. The Auto 110 and its improved successor, the Pentax Auto 110 Super (Japan) of 1982, were the only interchangeable lens 110 SLRs ever produced and the most advanced 110 cameras ever made, but were unable to prevent the demise of 110 film.
1979
Konica FS-1 (Japan): first SLR with built-in motorized autoloading. Also had autowinding (motorized single frame or continuous up to 1.5 frames per second film advance), but not auto-rewind. A snapshooter's great dislike (and Kodak bugbear) of 135 film was the need to manually thread the film leader into the camera's take-up spool. Built-in, motorized, automated film-transport systems (auto-load/wind/rewind) arrived with the Canon T70 (Japan) in 1984. Completely automated film handling systems appeared when automatic "DX" film speed setting was added to auto-transport in the Minolta Maxxum 7000 (Japan; see below) in 1985 and became standard in virtually all 35 mm SLRs by the late 1980s. This is, of course, a non-issue in modern digital SLRs. Although Konishiroku has a rich history including several first rank camera innovations, it was never able to establish Konica as a first tier brand and quit the SLR business in 1988.
1979
Asahi Pentax ME Super (Japan): first SLR with primarily electronic push button controls. Had increase/decrease push buttons for shutter speed selection instead of a traditional shutter speed dial. As digital computerized SLR features multiplied, push button controls also multiplied and replaced analogue electromechanical dial switches in most 35 mm SLRs by the late 1980s.
1979
Sedic Hanimex Reflex Flash 35 (Australia/Japan): first SLR with built-in electronic flash. Otherwise a wholly forgettable camera; a cheaply made 35 mm SLR of low specifications and poor quality, with a fixed Hanimar 41mm f/2.8 lens and mirror gate shutter.

=== 1980s ===
1980
Nikon F3 (Japan): first SLR with viewfinder liquid crystal display digital data display. LCD showed shutter speeds; manual mode and under/overexposure indicators. As computerized SLR features multiplied, comprehensive viewfinder LCD panels became normal in virtually all 35 mm SLRs by the late 1980s.
1981
Rolleiflex SL 2000 F (West Germany): first 35 mm SLR to not use the oblong body plus viewfinder head configuration and handling established by the Kine Exacta, 45 years before (see above). Had a cubic body, like a miniature 2 1/4 medium format SLR, with fixed dual telescopic eyelevel plus folding waist level finder. Also had interchangeable film backs, built-in motor drive, aperture priority AE and TTL autoflash. The 1980s saw varied attempts to stand out in a crowded marketplace by using unconventional 35 mm SLR body layouts. Besides the professional level Rolleiflex, they included the vertical Yashica Samurai series and the flat Ricoh Mirai (both 1988 and from Japan) point-and-shoot SLRs. They were all unsuccessful in establishing a new paradigm and the rectangular body plus pentaprism head layout reemerged universal again in the early 1990s, albeit usually with a large handgrip and rounded contours.
1981
Pentax ME F (Japan): first built-in autofocus 35 mm SLR. Had passive contrast detection AF system. Autofocused poorly and was not commercially successful. Also had Pentax K–F mount, a unique bayonet lens mount with five electric contact pins to pass focus control information between the ME F and its unique autofocusing SMC Pentax AF 35mm-70mm f/2.8 Zoom Lens. Note that the Ricoh AF Rikenon 50mm f/2 (Japan) lens of 1980 had a self-contained passive electronic rangefinder AF system in a bulky top-mounted box and was the first interchangeable autofocus SLR lens (for any Pentax K mount 35 mm SLR).
1981
Sigma 21-35mm f/3.5-4 (Japan): first super-wide angle zoom lens for SLRs. For decades, combining the complexities of rectilinear super-wide angle lenses, retrofocus lenses and zoom lenses seemed impossibly difficult. Sigma did the impossible and reached a 91° maximum field of view for 35 mm SLRs with an all-moving eleven element formula through the maturation of computer-aided design and multicoating. In 2004, the Sigma 12-24mm f/4.5-5.6 EX DG Aspherical HSM (Japan) zoom reached 122°, wider than any SLR prime lens ever made, by taking additional advantage of aspherics and low dispersion glasses.
1982
Ricoh XR-S (Japan): first solar powered SLR. Was a Ricoh XR-7 (Japan) aperture priority AE 35 mm SLR of 1981 modified with two silicon photovoltaic cells in the sides of the pentaprism housing that charged a unique 3 volt 2G13R "5-year" rechargeable silver oxide battery. This battery could be replaced with two regular 1.5 volt S76 (SR44) silver oxide batteries. The XR-7 and XR-S also had unusual viewfinder LCD showing meter pseudo-needle pointing along an analogue shutter speed scale to indicate light meter recommended settings, mimicking a traditional galvanometer needle.
1982
Polaroid SLR 680 (USA): first high-quality SLR with built-in electronic flash. Also had active sonar echo-location AF system. Took ten exposure, 3 1/8×3 1/8 inch frame Polaroid 600 instant film packs. Was improved Polaroid SX-70 Sonar (see above) AF SLR with almost-all plastic (acrylonitrile butadiene styrene [ABS]) body, built-in flash and faster film. The SLR 680 represents the zenith of instant photography and was the finest instant camera ever made. For a time in the 1960s and 70s, Polaroid instant cameras outsold all other high-end cameras combined, but the popularity of instant photography waned throughout the 1980s as auto-everything 35 mm point-and-shoot cameras and fast one-hour film developing became common. Polaroid went bankrupt in 2001.
1983
Pentax Super A (Japan; called Super Program in USA): first SLR with external LCD data display. With push buttons for shutter speed selection instead of a shutter speed dial, the Super Program used an LCD to show set shutter speed. As computerized SLR features multiplied, large external LCD panels became normal on virtually all 35 mm SLRs by the late 1980s.
1983
Nikon FA (Japan): first camera with multi-segmented (or matrix or evaluative; called Automatic Multi-Pattern) light meter. The FA had a built-in computer system programmed to analyze light levels in five different segments of the field of view for convenient exposure control in difficult lighting situations. After TTL SLR meters were introduced by the Topcon RE Super in 1963 (see above), the various SLR manufacturers tried many different sensitivity schemes (full area averaging, centerweighted, partial area and spot were the most common) in the 1960s before settling in the mid-1970s on centerweighted as the best (90% acceptable exposures) available system. AMP cut the error rate by half. Matrix meters became virtually standard in 35 mm SLRs by 1990 and modern ones are virtually 100% technically accurate. Note however, the technically correct "18% gray" exposure is not necessarily the artistically desirable exposure. In 1996, the number of computer analyzed segments reached a maximum of 1005 in the Nikon F5 (Japan).
1983
Olympus OM-4 (Japan): first camera with built-in multiple spot-meter (2% of view; 3.3° with 50mm lens). Meter could measure eight individual spots and average them for precise exposure control in difficult lighting situations. Spotmeters versus matrix meters represent the opposite ends of the light meter spectrum: fully manual contemplative metering versus completely computerized instantaneous metering.
1985
Minolta Alpha 7000 (Japan; called Maxxum 7000 in USA, 7000 AF in Europe): first commercially successful autofocus 35 mm SLR, first passive phase comparison AF SLR, first system AF SLR, first SLR with completely automated film handling (auto-load/wind/rewind/speed setting). Well-integrated PASM autoexposure and built-in motor winder design with very good interchangeable lenses and large accessory system. Ever since the first autofocus camera, the non-SLR Konica C35 AF 35 mm P/S of 1977 (with its built-in passive electronic rangefinder system), AF had been common in 35 mm point-and-shoot cameras. The phenomenal success of the Maxxum temporarily made Minolta the world's number one SLR brand and permanently made the AF SLR the dominant 35 mm SLR type. Minolta suffered major reverses in the 1990s and was forced to merge with Konica in 2003, and then to transfer its technology to Sony and quit the camera business in 2006, after selling 13.5 million Maxxums.
1985
Kiron 28-210mm f/4-5.6 (Japan): first very large ratio focal length "superzoom" lens for still cameras. Was first 135 film zoom lens to range from standard wide angle to long telephoto; albeit with a small variable maximum aperture to keep size, weight and cost within reason. Although the 10 to 1 ratio Angénieux 12-120mm f/2.2 (France) zoom had been introduced for 16 mm movie cameras in 1961, and consumer Super-8 movie and Betamax/VHS video cameras long had superzooms, early 35 mm SLR zoom focal length ratios rarely exceeded 3 to 1, because of 135 film's much higher acceptable image standards. Despite their many image quality compromises, convenient superzooms (sometimes with ratios over 10 to 1) became common on amateur level 35 mm SLRs by the late 1990s. They remain a standard lens on today's amateur digital SLRs, with the Tamron AF18-270mm f/3.5-6.3 Di II VC LD Aspherical (IF) MACRO attaining 15× in 2008. Note, the Canon DIGISUPER 100 xs, a 100× (9.3-930mm f/1.7-4.7; Japan) broadcast television zoom lens, was introduced in 2002.
1987
Pentax SFX (Japan; called SF1 in USA): first interchangeable lens SLR with built-in electronic flash (first built-in flash with TTL autoexposure in any camera). Built-in electronic flashes for convenient auxiliary light in dim situations or for fill-light in high contrast situations first appeared on the non-SLR Voigtländer Vitrona (West Germany) of 1964 and had been common on point-and-shoot cameras since the mid-1970s. Built-in TTL autoflashes became standard on all but the most expensive 35 mm SLRs cameras by the early 1990s.
1987
Canon EF mount (Japan): first all-electronic contact camera lens mount for interchangeable lens cameras. Introduced by Canon EOS 650 and EOS 620 35 mm SLR bodies and Canon EF lenses, this lens mount is essentially a computer data port. Mechanical camera-to-lens linkages can link auto-diaphragm lenses and instant return mirror, focal-plane shutter SLRs, but electronic autofocus required additional electronic data exchange between camera and lens. Canon decided to place everything under electronic control, even though it meant that earlier Canon lenses would not be usable with the new bodies.
1988
Minolta Maxxum 7000i (Japan; called Dynax 7000i in Europe, Alpha 7700i in Japan): first multi-sensor (three, in an "H" pattern) passive autofocus SLR. First generation AF SLRs had a single central AF sensor. However, composition rules generally say it is wrong to have dead center subjects and most compositions have off-center subjects. Multiple AF sensor arrays covering a wide area can more easily focus on these compositions. In 2007, the number of AF sensors reached 51 in the Nikon D3 and D300 (Japan) digital SLRs. In 1990, the 7000i and a sister camera, the Minolta Maxxum 8000i (Japan, 1990), were also the first 35 mm SLRs with available "panoramic" format film gate mask and focusing screen accessory. Introduced in 1989 by the Kodak Stretch 35 (USA) single-use camera, this 13×36 mm frame on 135 film with 3 1/2×10 inch prints was a faddish snapshot format during the 1990s.
1989
Yashica Samurai Z-L (Japan): first SLR intentionally designed for left-handed operation. Took up to 72 exposures of horizontal 18×24 mm single frames (also called half frames) on 135 film. Had flat-topped non-pentaprism mirror reflex and optical relay viewfinder. Also had unique-to-Samurai-series vertical body design with fixed autofocus 25–75mm f/4–5.6 zoom lens, interlens leaf shutter, programmed autoexposure, built-in motor drive and electronic flash. Was mirror copy of auto-everything, point-and-shoot Samurai Z camera.

=== 1990s ===
1991
Kodak Digital Camera System DCS (USA/Japan): first digital still capture SLR. Was a heavily modified Nikon F3 (Japan) 35 mm SLR and MD-4 motor drive with 1024×1280 pixel (1.3 MP) charge-coupled device (CCD) sensor, 8 MB DRAM memory and a tethered 200 MB (160 images) Digital Storage Unit (DSU) hard drive. Used manual focus Nikon F mount lenses with 2× lens field of view factor compared to standard 135 film. List price was US$19,995 (standard Nikon F3HP was US$1295 list; MD-4, US$485). Electronic still (then using analogue processing and called still video) photography was first publicly demonstrated by original Sony Mavica (Japan) 490×570 pixel (280 kP) CCD, prototype SLR camera in 1981. The Institute of Electrical and Electronics Engineers has called the DCS's Kodak KAF-1300 (USA, 1986) image sensor one of "25 Microchips That Shook the World" because the DCS began the digital photography revolution. Digital photography did not alter the basic focal-plane shutter, instant return mirror, pentaprism, auto-diaphragm lens, TTL meter, autoexposure and autofocus formula of SLR camera design developed over the previous century – except, of course, it is filmless.
1992
Nikonos RS (Japan): first waterproof 35 mm system SLR for 100 m maximum depth, underwater diving use. Had autofocus, autoexposure, TTL autoflash, excellent interchangeable lenses and good accessory system.
1995
Canon EF 75-300mm f/4-5.6 IS USM (Japan): first SLR lens with built-in image stabilization (called Image Stabilizer; for Canon EOS 35 mm SLRs). Had an electromechanical system to detect and counteract handheld camera/lens unsteadiness, allowing sharp photographs of static subjects at shutter speeds much slower than normally possible without a tripod. The first stabilized lens for consumer cameras was the 38-105mm f/4-7.8 lens built into the Nikon Zoom-Touch 105 VR (Japan) 35 mm point-and-shoot of 1994. Image stabilized lenses were initially very expensive and used mostly by professional photographers. Stabilization surged into the amateur digital SLR market in 2006. However, the Konica Minolta Maxxum 7D (Japan) digital SLR introduced the first camera body-based stabilization system in 2004 and there is now a great engineering and marketing battle over whether the system should be lens-based (counter-shift lens elements) or camera-based (counter-shift image sensor). In the case of the Pentax system, the backwards compatibility of the modern DSLRs for the entire K-mount lens range (and the M42 screwmount lenses with an adapter) means that even these older lenses are fully stabilised, something not possible with in-lens systems such as those of Canon or Nikon.
1996
Minolta Vectis S-1 (Japan/Malaysia): first Advanced Photo System (APS) IX240 film SLR. Took up to forty exposures of 16.7×30.2 mm frames on polyethylene naphthalate base, singly perforated 24 mm wide film coated with invisible magnetic data encoding stripe, pre-loaded into self-locking ready-to-use cartridges. Had flat-topped non-pentaprism sideways mirror reflex and optical relay viewfinder. Compact design with good lenses and large accessory system. APS film was introduced by Kodak, Canon, Fuji, Minolta and Nikon in 1996 as Kodak's last attempt (of many) at drop-in film loading. APS was moderately popular, but faded quickly and almost dead by 2002.

=== 21st century ===
2000
Canon EOS D30 (Japan): first complementary metal–oxide–semiconductor (CMOS) sensor digital SLR; first digital SLR intended to be a relatively affordable, advanced amateur level camera. Took up to 1440×2160 pixel (3.11 MP) digital images. Used Canon EF mount lenses with a 1.6× lens factor, compared to 135 film. The use of a cheaper and lower quality CMOS sensor allowed a price (US$3499 initial list price; US$2999 in 2001; body only) about half of contemporary professional CCD digital SLRs; giving ambitious amateurs the choice of an interchangeable lens digital SLR, in addition to the digital point-and-shoots common in the late 1990s.
2003
Canon EOS Kiss Digital (Japan; called EOS Digital Rebel in USA, EOS 300D Digital in Europe): first sub-US$1000 high-resolution digital SLR. Well-integrated focal-plane shutter, instant return mirror, pentamirror, auto-diaphragm, autoexposure, matrix-metering, autofocus, built-in autoflash, computer-controlled design with excellent lenses and good accessory system. Took up to 2048×3072 pixel (6.3 MP) digital images using a 15.1×22.7 mm complementary metal–oxide–semiconductor (CMOS) sensor (1.6× lens factor). With an original list price of US$899 (body only; US$999 with 18-55mm f/3.5-5.6 Canon EF-S zoom lens), it sold 1.2 million units around the world in sixteen months and was primarily responsible for digital SLR sales vaulting past film SLR sales worldwide in 2004.
2006
Olympus Evolt E-330 (Japan): first live view digital SLR. Had a secondary CCD sensor to send a live video feed to a swiveling 2.5-inch (64 mm) color LCD panel (normally used for camera function data) and allow its use as an auxiliary viewfinder when the photographer's eye cannot be at the SLR viewfinder eyepiece. A sharper live view mode was available that temporarily flipped aside the reflex mirror (blacking out the primary porro-mirror SLR viewfinder) and opened the shutter to send a live feed from the primary 2352×3136 pixel (7.5 MP) Four-Thirds format MOS image sensor. Most new for 2008 digital SLRs had a live view mode. Although today live view has limitations (unintelligibility in bright sunlight, image lag with moving subjects, rapid battery drain, etc.), its perfection, plus an electronic shutter, would make the bulky and expensive precision mechanisms and optics of a focal-plane shutter, instant return mirror and pentaprism unnecessary and allow the camera to be a completely electronic device. (This has already occurred with snapshot cameras – the vast majority of point-and-shoot digital cameras lack an optical viewfinder.) In other words, the Micro Four-Thirds format Panasonic LUMIX DMC-G1 (Japan, 2008) mirror-less non-SLR, interchangeable lens digital camera with high resolution electronic live view viewfinder and LCD might be the first of a new breed of camera with the potential to end the history of the single-lens reflex camera.
2008
Nikon D90 (Japan): first digital SLR with high definition video recording capability. Had 12.3 MP APS-sized CMOS sensor with secondary 1280×720 pixel (720p), 24 frames per second HD video capture with monaural sound for five minutes in September. Two months later, the Canon EOS 5D Mark II (Japan) 21.1MP full-frame CMOS D-SLR came out with 1920×1080 pixel (1080p), 30 frame/s HD video with monaural sound (stereo with external microphone) for twelve minutes. The D90 and 5D II are otherwise straightforward 2008 D-SLRs. Point-and-shoot digital cameras have had video recording (usually standard definition, but HD recently) for a few years and it is expected that HD video recording will soon become a standard D-SLR feature.

== See also ==
- Category:SLR cameras
- Alpa
- Box camera
- Cosina
- Digital single-lens reflex camera
- Fujifilm
- Full-frame digital SLR
- List of photographic equipment makers
- Miranda Camera Company
- Nikon SP — rangefinder camera from which the Nikon F evolved
- Optics
- Pentacon
- Photographic film
- Rangefinder camera
- Scheimpflug principle
- Single lens reflex camera
- Twin-lens reflex camera
- Zeiss Ikon
- Zorki

== Bibliography ==
- Aguila, Clément and Rouah, Michel Exakta Cameras, 1933–1978. 2003 reprint. Small Dole, West Sussex, UK: Hove Collectors Books, 1987. ISBN 0-906447-38-0.
- Antonetto, Marco: "Rectaflex, The Magic Reflex". Nassa Watch Gallery, Roma 2002. 261 pages. ISBN 8887161011, ISBN 9788887161014.
- Capa, Cornell, editorial director, ICP Encyclopedia of Photography. New York, NY: Crown Publishers Inc., 1984. ISBN 0-517-55271-X. "SLR (Single-Lens Reflex) Camera,".
- Cecchi, Danilo Asahi Pentax and Pentax SLR 35mm Cameras: 1952–1989. Susan Chalkley, translator. Hove Collectors Book. Hove, Sussex, UK: Hove Foto Books, 1991. ISBN 0-906447-62-3.
- Franklin, Harold User's Guide to Olympus Modern Classics. 1997 Printing. Jersey, Channel Islands: Hove Foto Books Limited, 1991. ISBN 0-906447-90-9.
- Gilbert, George Collecting Photographica: The Images and Equipment of the First Hundred Years of Photography. New York, NY: Hawthorn/Dutton, 1976. ISBN 0-8015-1407-X.
- Goldberg, Norman Camera Technology: The Dark Side of the Lens. San Diego, CA: Academic Press, 1992. ISBN 0-12-287570-2.
- Hansen, Bill and Dierdorff, Michael Japanese 35mm SLR Cameras: A Comprehensive Data Guide. Small Dole, UK: Hove Books, 1998. ISBN 1-874707-29-4.
- Kimata, Hiroshi and Schneider, Jason "The Truth About SLR Viewfinders. Some are bright, some are light, but few are both", Popular Photography, Volume 58 Number 6; June 1994. ISSN 0032-4582.
- Kingslake, Rudolf A History of the Photographic Lens. San Diego, CA: Academic Press, 1989. ISBN 0-12-408640-3.
- Kraszna-Krausz, A., chairman of editorial board, The Focal Encyclopedia of Photography. Revised Desk Edition, 1973 reprint. New York, NY: McGraw-Hill Book Co., 1969.
- Krause, Peter "50 Years of Kodachrome," Modern Photography, Volume 49, Number 10; October 1985. ISSN 0026-8240.
- Lea, Rudolph The Register of 35mm Single Lens Reflex Cameras: From 1936 to the Present. Second Edition. Hückelhoven, Germany: Rita Wittig Fachbuchverlag, 1993. ISBN 3-88984-130-9.
- Lothrop, Eaton S. Jr., "Time Exposure: The first SLR? It all began with a small 'dark room'". Popular Photography, Volume 83 Number 1; January 1976. ISSN 0032-4582.
- Matanle, Ivor Collecting and Using Classic SLRs. First Paperback Edition. New York, NY: Thames and Hudson, 1997. ISBN 0-500-27901-2.
- Ray, Sidney F. The Photographic Lens. Second revised edition. Oxford, UK: Focal Press/Butterworth-Heinemann, 1992. ISBN 0-240-51329-0.
- Shell, Bob Canon Compendium: Handbook of the Canon System. Hove, UK: Hove Books, 1994. ISBN 1-897802-04-8.
- Shull, Henry "Tough Exposures? Hit The Spot!! The best metering system for tricky lighting situations isn't in your camera—it's behind the eyepiece!" Modern Photography, Volume 51, Number 11; November 1987. ISSN 0026-8240.
- Spira, S. F.; Lothrop, Eaton S. Jr. and R. Spira, Jonathan The History of Photography as Seen Through the Spira Collection. New York, NY: Aperture, 2001 ISBN 0-89381-953-0.
- The Japanese Historical Camera. 日本の歴史的カメラ (Nihon no rekishiteki kamera). 2nd ed. Tokyo: JCII Camera Museum, 2004. The (minimal) text is in both Japanese and English.
- Wade, John A Short History of the Camera. Watford, Hertfordshire, UK: Fountain Press/Argus Books Limited, 1979. ISBN 0-85242-640-2.
- Wade, John The Collector's Guide to Classic Cameras: 1945–1985. Small Dole, UK: Hove Books, 1999. ISBN 1-897802-11-0.
