= Rectaflex =

Single-lens reflex camera

Rectaflex was the world's first series produced Pentaprism single-lens reflex camera (SLR). It was produced from 1948 to 1958. Rectaflex was the only Italian SLR ever built.

== Original Rectaflex ==
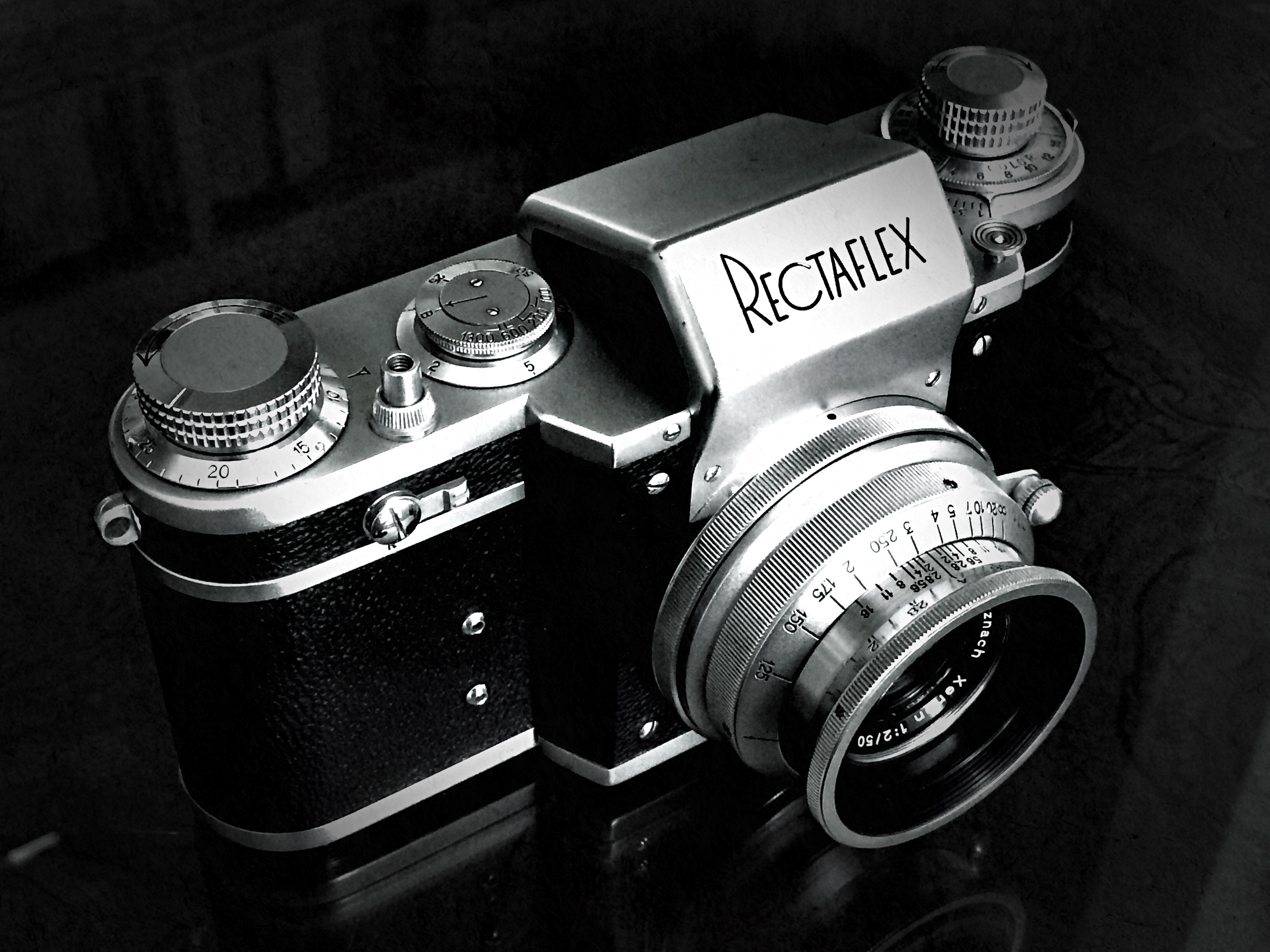
Rectaflex

The Rectaflex was a 35mm SLR camera with a Focal-plane shutter, interchangeable lenses and a pentaprism eye-level finder. It was the world's first SLR equipped with a pentaprism.

It also had a wide diameter bayonet mount and a Rapid Return Mirror. The chief designer was Telemaco Corsi.
