= Sport (camera) =

35mm SLR camera

GOMZ Sport c.1937
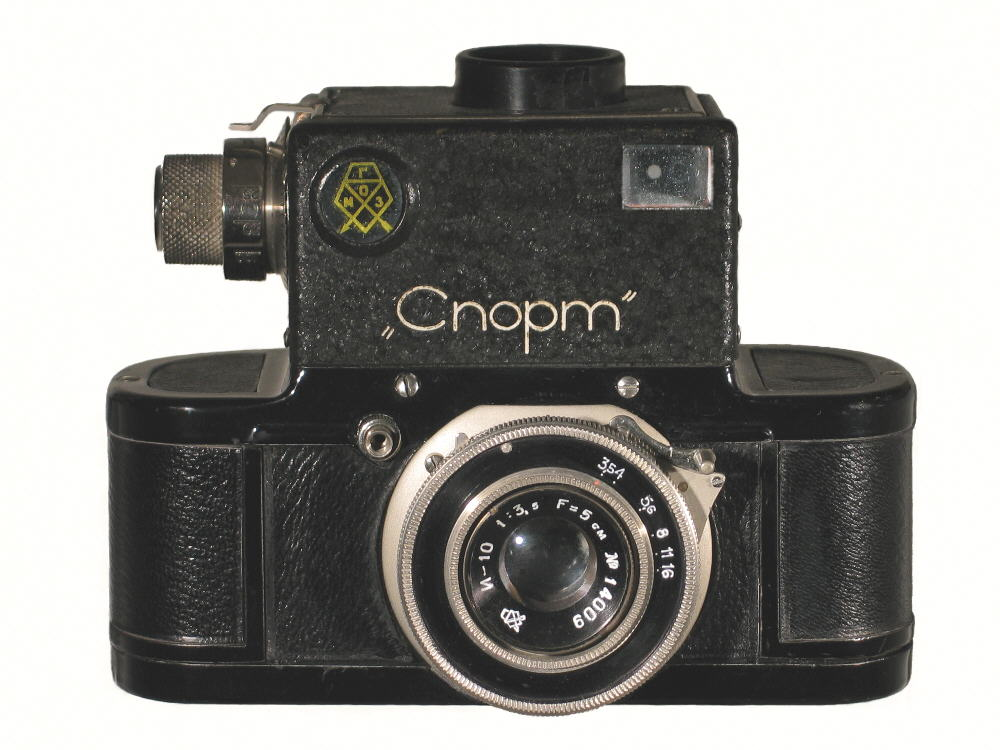

Overview
- Type: 35mm SLR

Lens
- Lens mount: bayonet

Focusing
- Focus: helical in body lens mount

Exposure/metering
- Exposure: 24 × 36mm on 35mm film

General
- Dimensions: 133 × 103 × 68mm, 750g

The "Sport" camera is the series production model of a prototype camera called Gelveta. The Gelveta was designed and built by A. O. Gelgar between 1934 and 1935. It is the earliest known production 35mm SLR camera ever to be built, but fewer than 320 examples were made. The actual launch date of the "Sport" is somewhat uncertain, however it was in series production by 1936 and must undoubtedly be one of the two earliest generally available SLR cameras using the 35mm film format, the other being the German Ihagee Kine Exakta, launched in 1936. It was manufactured by the Soviet camera factory Gosudarstvennyi Optiko-Mekhanicheskii Zavod, The State Optical-Mechanical Factory in Leningrad. GOMZ for short. The camera name is engraved in Cyrillic on the finder housing above the lens: „Спорm“. The manufacturer's prism logo in gold on black with the factory initials ГОМЗ (GOMZ) is shown behind a circular magnifying window on the top left camera front. An estimated number of 19,000 cameras were made before Leningrad was besieged in September 1941 and suffered heavy damage. The design concept was not continued later.

The development of the "Sport" was a lengthy process. It was predeceeded by the "Filmanka" SLR designed in Russia by A. A. Min as early as 1931. The "Filmanka" was transferred to GOMZ and may have inspired the pre-production Gelveta design, which turned into the "Sport" production model. The B and 1/25 to 1/500 second focal-plane shutter employs a pair of metal plates, which form a vertically rising slit during exposure. The slit width determines the exposure. The shutter operation incorporates a quick-rising non-returning reflex mirror. The combined shutter speed dial and wind-on knob, situated on the right-hand side, is stationary during exposure. The film transport is from cassette to cassette, no rewind is provided. The original pair of cassettes would take enough film for fifty exposures. A manual-reset frame counter is at the base of the wind-on knob. The camera has an eye-level vertical viewfinder for looking down onto the focusing screen, as well as a built-in direct vision "action finder". The integral camera base and back is removed for film loading. The camera was designed to take interchangeable bayonet mounted lenses, but the only lens available was the Industar "И-10 1 : 3, 5 F = 5 cm" lens. Except for a few examples there is no serial number on the camera body, the lens serial number is used for identification. The camera bayonet lens mount incorporates the focusing helix with an infinity catch, and the mount itself is similar to that for the Zeiss Ikon Contax.

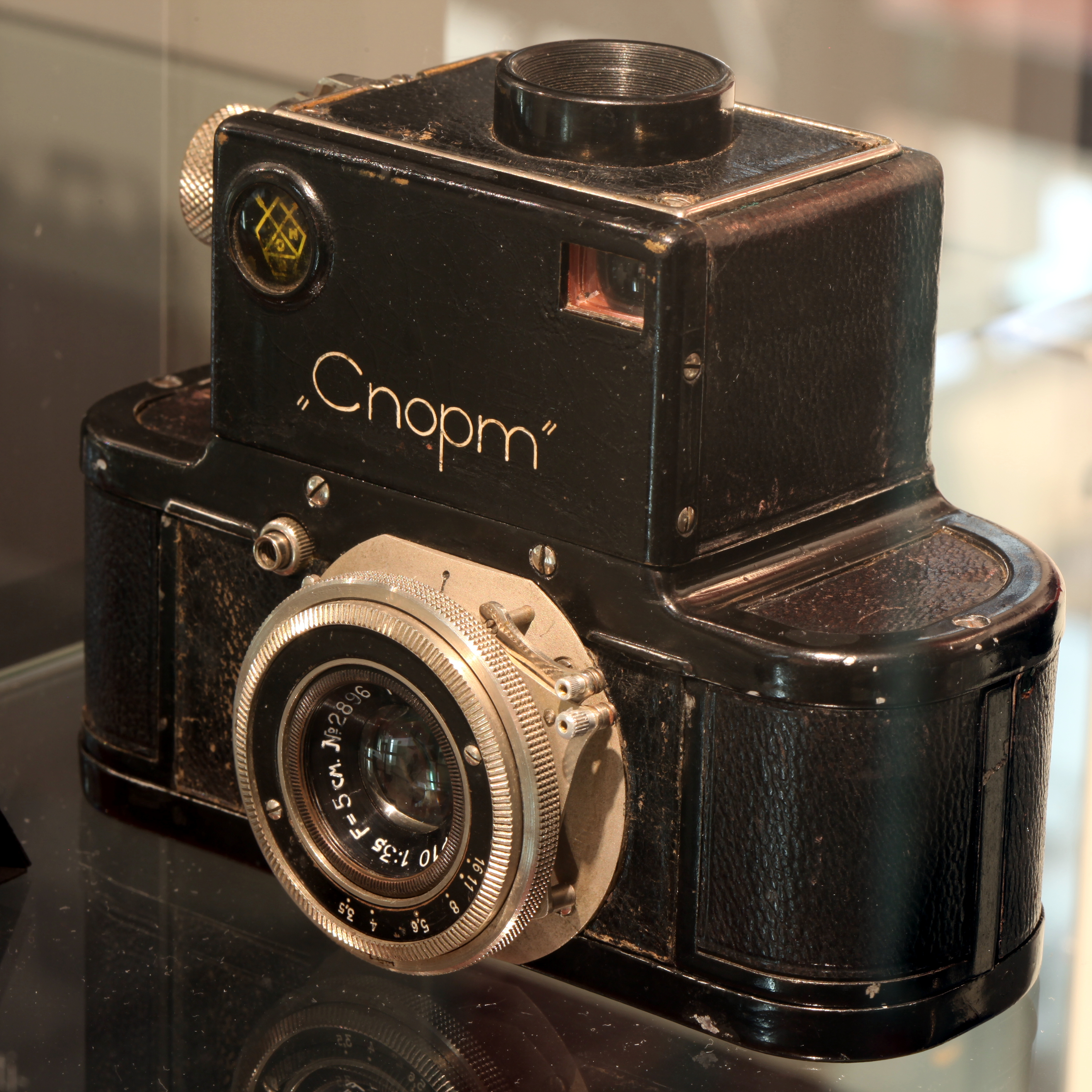
The Sport, manufactured between 1937 ~ 1941
