= Johnson Smith Company =

American mail-order company

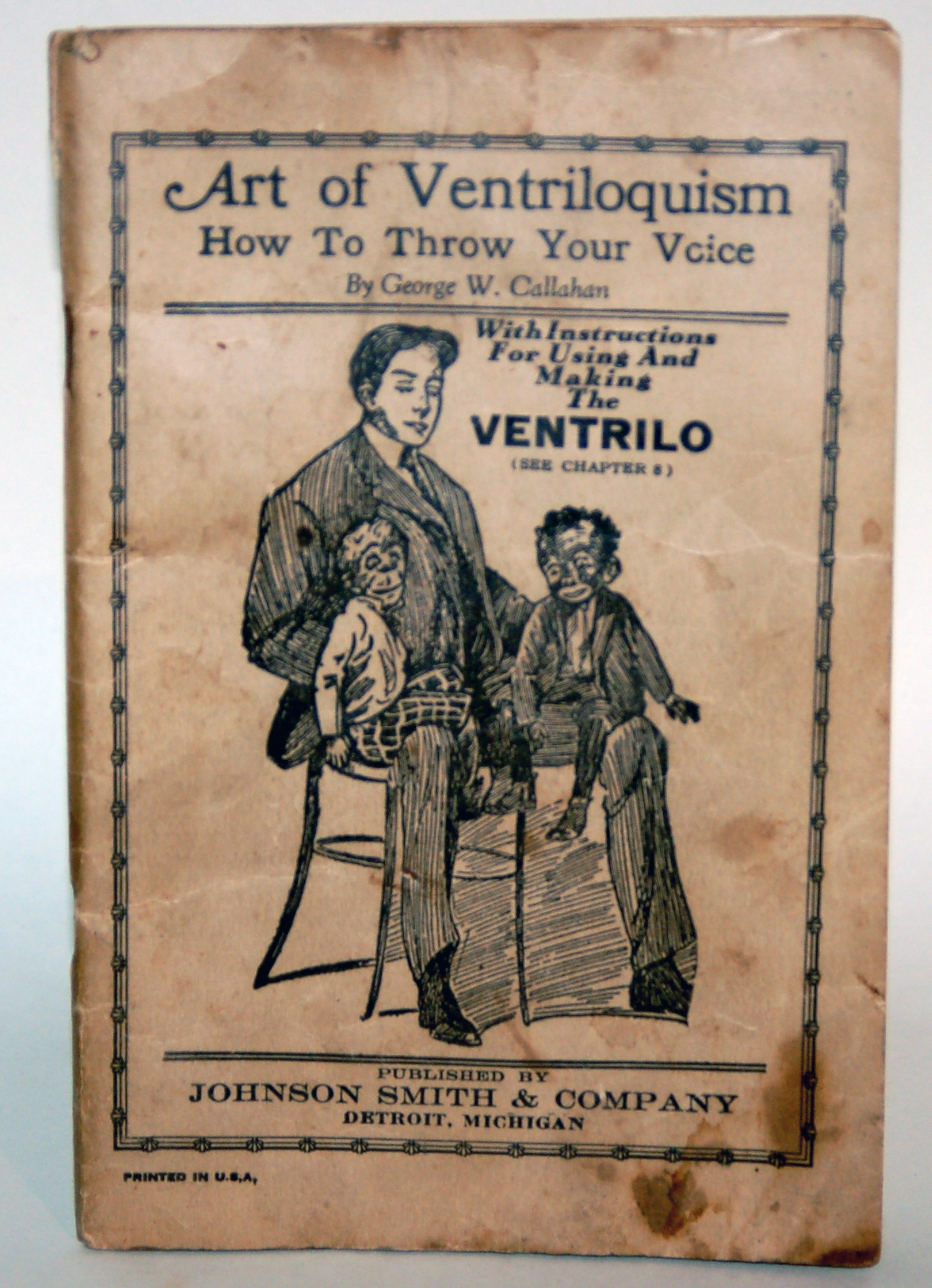
Early 20th century Ventriloquism Guide and novelties catalogue

Johnson Smith Company (Johnson Smith & Co.) was a mail-order business established in 1914 by Alfred Johnson Smith that sold novelty items and gag gifts such as miniature cameras, invisible ink, x-ray goggles, whoopee cushions, fake vomit, and joy buzzers. Founded in Chicago, the company relocated to Racine, Wisconsin in 1923, to Detroit in the late 1930s, then to Bradenton, Florida in 1986.

The company advertised in magazines devoted to children and young adults such as Boys' Life, Popular Mechanics, and Science Digest. Their ads appeared on the back cover of many historically significant comic books, including Action Comics #1, June 1938 (first appearance of Superman) and Detective Comics #27, May 1939 (first appearance of Batman).

In 1970, humorist Jean Shepherd wrote the introduction for the reprint of The 1929 Johnson Smith & Co. Catalogue, writing

The Johnson Smith catalog is a magnificent, smudgy thumbprint of a totally lusty, vibrant, alive, crude post-frontier society, a society that was, and in some ways still remains, an exotic mixture of moralistic piety and violent, primitive humor.

After marking its centennial anniversary in 2014, the company ceased operations on December 31, 2019, and was acquired by Collections Etc. in 2020.

== Johnson Smith Timeline ==
- 1885 – Alfred Johnson Smith is born in Halifax, Yorkshire, England.
- 1887 – Alfred and his family move to Brisbane, Queensland, Australia. As a young man, Alfred began a small mail-order business selling a complete line of rubber stamps through ads in popular magazines and by mailing circulars.
- 1906–1907 – Marries Alice Elizabeth Evans. Moves to Sydney and starts a mail-order business selling rubber stamps and imported novelties of all kinds through a catalog.
- 1914 – Alfred Johnson Smith moves to Chicago to make his mark in America. He sells masks and whoopie cushions out of the trunk of his automobile, then through a 64-page catalogue of surprising novelties, puzzles, tricks, joke goods, and useful articles. Alice and their two young children (ages 6 and 1) follow in a few months. Johnson Smith Company still sold whoopee cushions, invisible ink, joy buzzers, and x-ray glasses in the late 2010s.
- 1922 – Johnson Smith Catalog grows to 400 pages, employing more than 150 people. The company is moved to Racine, Wisconsin after Alfred fails at publishing a magazine that competed against The Saturday Evening Post.
- 1923 – The catalog grows to 576 pages, with 100,000 copies being printed.
- 1923–1935 – Throughout the Depression, sales were minuscule. However, the catalog was still compiled and printed, providing a light-hearted diversion for thousands of families. Full-page ads showing new items were run in science, outdoor, detective, Western, and boys' magazines.
- 1935 – Alfred's son, Arthur, joins the business, followed by his other son Paul, the following year. Comic magazines become popular — Johnson Smith Co. becomes one of the first advertisers. Cartoonist H.T. Webster regularly copies Johnson Smith Co. items and descriptions from the catalog into The Katzenjammer Kids comics. Alfred moves the company to Detroit, Michigan, hoping to market the catalog in Canada and British Colonies, but World War II ends that dream.
- 1941 – The last full-size catalog was published as the U.S. enters the war years. The company goes on a hiatus through 1946 due to lack of merchandise, personnel, paper, etc.
- 1948 – Alfred Johnson Smith dies at age 63.
- 1952 – Johnson Smith Co. publishes a 96-page catalog of 2,800 of its most popular items. Company sales and circulation increase, enabling the company to buy and sell merchandise for less.
- 1955 - Mad Magazine runs a zany lampoon of Johnson Smith ads on the cover of its March issue #21 that creates even more business.
- 1966 – Paul Hoenle joins the company. Arthur Smith decides to retire as his health declines. Approximately 400 mail-order companies in the U.S. at this time.
- 1967 – Additional space is purchased in Detroit; the company resumes effort to find new merchandise, and comic and science magazine advertising resumes in earnest; the business begins to grow again; professional personnel are hired.
- 1967–1970 – 300,000 to 500,000 copies of the 96-page digest-size, black-and-white catalog are printed annually during this period. New technology and machinery is added to handle the increased number of orders. An IBM accounting computer is installed, updated versions of a coin sorter and paper-money counter are added, a new letter-opening machine mechanizes opening of customer orders, including equipment to expedite shipping and handling. Mailing lists are placed on magnetic tape.
- 1970 – Jean Shepherd writes an introduction about the 1929 Johnson Smith Catalog, and suggests that the catalog "might well be the Rosetta Stone of American Culture."
- 1971 – Johnson Smith Co. moves into a major new facility in Mt. Clemens, Michigan. The company begins accepting telephone orders and honors most credit cards.
- 1971–1985 – Things You Never Knew Existed slogan is coined to describe the Johnson Smith Catalog. The company continues to advertise in Boys' Life, but other magazine advertisements are halted due to poor response. By 1980, Johnson Smith Catalog is published in four-color. Hot-selling items during this period include Star Trek Phaser Model Kits, The Mystery Top, Put-Put Boat, X-Ray Specs, Pink Panther Mug, and the M*A*S*H T-shirt. More than one million Midget Bibles are sold in 1979, purchased by carnivals and handed out as an incentive for making a charitable donation.
- 1979 – Company launches The Lighter Side.
- 1986 – Company moves to 54,000-square-foot (5,000 m^{2}) facility in Bradenton, Florida, where it remains today. A management information specialist is hired to guide the installation and utilization of a "state of the art" mainframe computer system.
- 1997 – E-commerce sites are launched for Things You Never Knew Existed (formerly known as the Johnson Smith Catalog) and The Lighter Side.
- 1998 – Betty's Attic, featuring nostalgic items is launched, along with its e-commerce website.
- 2000 – Clever Gear is launched, along with its e-commerce site. Ralph Hoenle is named president upon Paul's retirement. Paul remains chairman.
- 2003 – Full Of Life is launched, offering gear for the aging baby boomers. www.HalloweenOnly.com is launched as a result of strong Halloween merchandise sales experienced by the company. Additional 15,000 sq ft (1,400 m^{2}) of space is rented.
- 2004 – A proactive public relations campaign, The Art of Having Fun, is launched to build consumer awareness of key brands.
- 2005 – 40 Below, the company's first outlet store, is opened in Bradenton.
- 2019 – Johnson Smith shuts its doors after 105 years in business.

== Catalogs ==
- Johnson Smith Catalog (1907)
- Things You Never Knew Existed (1979)
- The Lighter Side (1979)
- Betty's Attic (1998)
- Clever Gear & Other Smart Innovations (2000)
- Full of Life (2002)
- HalloweenOnly.com (2003)

== See also ==
- Archie McPhee, a similar Seattle, Washington-based novelty company that began as a mail-order business.
