= Tenax =

Tenax may refer to:

- The trademark name of Poly(2,6-diphenylphenylene oxide), a chemical compound
- Phormium tenax, a species of flowering plant
- Fasolasuchus tenax, a species of pseudosuchian.
- A brand of glue marketed by Toho Tenax
- Zeiss-Ikon Tenax I camera
- Zeiss-Ikon Tenax II camera
- Tenax Grupa, a construction material manufacturer based in Dobele, Latvia
