= Keith Monroe =

American author (1915–2003)

- Born: August 22, 1915; Detroit, Michigan, U.S.
- Died: August 30, 2003 (aged 88); Berkeley, California, U.S.
- Other names: Donald Keith, Dale Colombo, Rice E. Cochran
- Occupations: Author and Boy Scout leader
- Known for: Time Machine stories

Keith Monroe (22 August 1915 – 30 August 2003) was an American author of children's science fiction and of books and magazine articles about Boy Scouting.

Monroe attended Stanford University and UCLA. He worked as a reporter for the New York Herald Tribune, for advertising and public relations firms, and for North American Rockwell. At times, he was a full-time freelance writer.

His work appeared in such magazines as Saturday Evening Post, New Yorker, |Harper's, Blue Book, Galaxy, Argosy, Boys' Life, and Scouting. His pseudonyms included Donald Keith, Rice E. Cochran, and Dale Colombo.

== Scouting ==
Monroe was deeply involved with Scouting. He served as Scoutmaster for Troop 2 in Santa Monica, California from its founding in December 1945 until 1987.

He wrote articles for Scouting, the magazine for adult Scout leaders; merit badge instruction pamphlets; and fiction for Boys' Life. Under the name Rice E. Cochran, he published Be Prepared!, a humorous memoir of his experiences as a Scoutmaster.It was the basis for the 1953 movie Mister Scoutmaster.

Monroe was a recipient of the Silver Beaver Award.

== Science fiction ==
Collaborating under the pseudonym Donald Keith with his father, Donald Monroe, Keith Monroe wrote the Time Machine series, originally published in Boys' Life between 1959 and 1989.

Donald Keith also contributed stories to Galaxy Science Fiction and Blue Book.

Using the pseudonym Dale Colombo, Keith Monroe published in Boys' Life a series about Scouts in space, featuring a protagonist named Ed Linden, set aboard the spaceship Magellan. These Scouts had been born in interstellar space during the decades-long journey from Earth to planets orbiting a distant star.

== Bibliography ==
- Harman, Bob; Monroe, Keith (1950). Use Your Head in Tennis. Crowell. ISBN 9780690005844.
- Cochran, Rice E. (1952). Be prepared!: The life and illusions of a scoutmaster. Random House.
- Monroe, Donald; Monroe, Keith (1962). How to Succeed in Community Service. Lippincott. ASIN B001UXCLWG.
- Monroe, Keith (1963). California: How to Live, Work, and Have Fun in the Golden State. Random House. ASIN B000L1V4FS.
- Keith, Donald (1963). Mutiny in the Time Machine. illustrated by Marilyn Miller. Random House. ASIN B0007E9SWA.
- Keith, Donald (1967). Time Machine to the Rescue. illustrated by Albert Orbaan. Putnam. ASIN B0006BRBWS.
- Lindaman, Edward B.; Monroe, Keith (1969). Space: A New Direction for Mankind. Harper & Row. ASIN B00005WX6A.
- Hillcourt, William; Monroe, Keith (1980). The Official Patrol Leader Handbook (3 ed.). Boy Scouts of America. ISBN 978-0839565123.
