= Percy Keese Fitzhugh =

American writer

Percy Keese Fitzhugh (September 7, 1876 – July 5, 1950) was an American writer of nearly 100 books for children and young adults.

== Biography ==
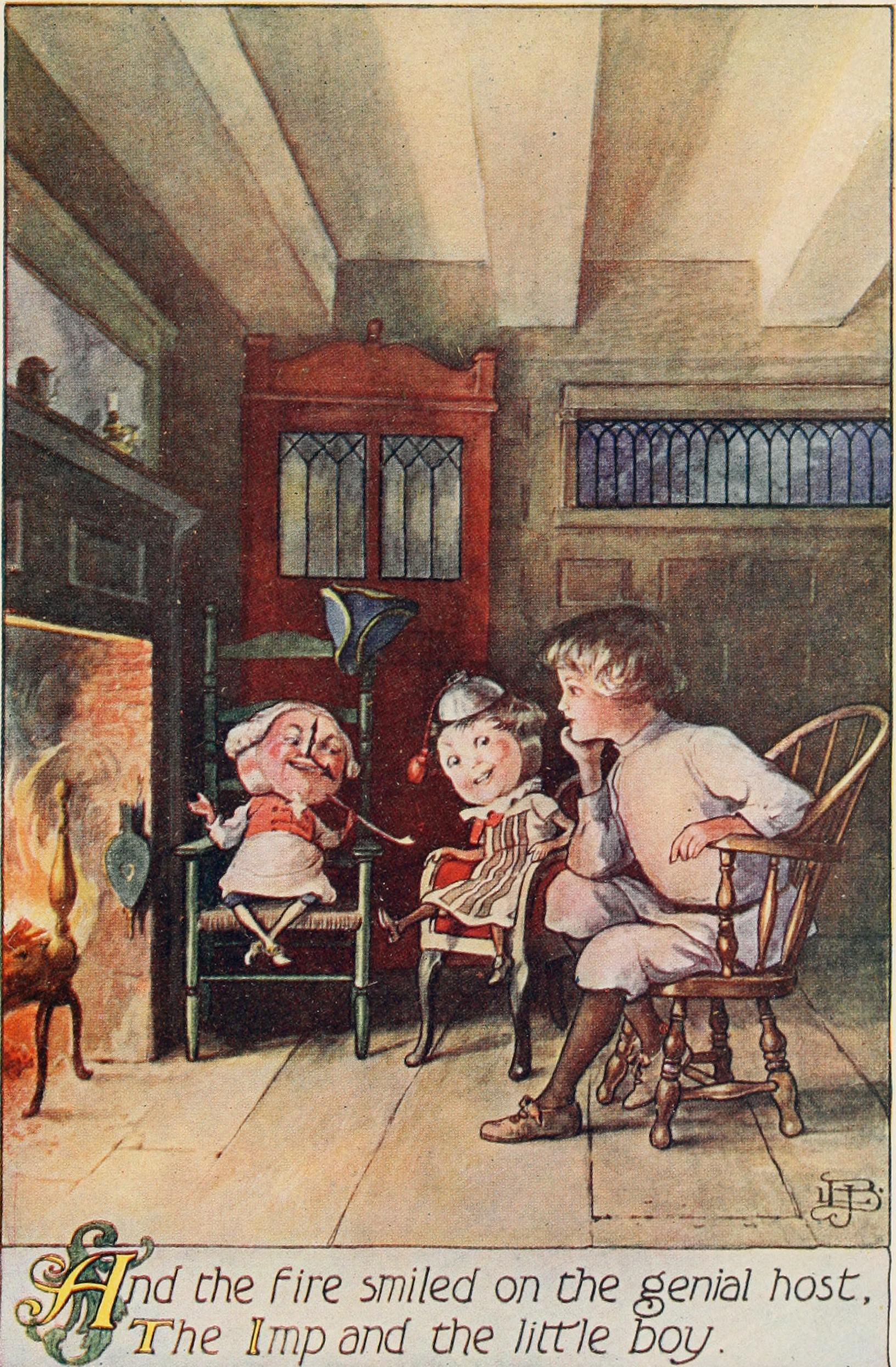
King Time: or The mystical land of the hours, a fantasy (1908)

Percy Keese Fitzhugh was born in Brooklyn, New York. He attended Pratt Institute in Brooklyn. Records do not indicate that he graduated. He married Harriet (Hatti) Lloyd LePorte on July 13, 1900, in Kingston, Massachusetts. Fitzhugh's first known work, The Goldenrod Story Book was published in 1906.

The bulk of his work, having a Boy Scouting theme, revolves around the fictional town of Bridgeboro, New Jersey. Major characters included Tom Slade, Pee-Wee Harris, Roy Blakeley, and Westy Martin. Each of these characters had their own, distinctly different, series of books. In addition, Fitzhugh contributed Boy Scout stories to a fifth series of books, Buddy Books for Boys, which featured individual stories of other characters and situations by a variety of authors. In all, Grosset & Dunlap published nearly 70 different Fitzhugh titles in these 5 series.

Although there really is a New Jersey town named Bridgeboro, the model for Fitzhugh's Bridgeboro was his own home town of Hackensack, New Jersey. Many of the places and features of the fictional Bridgeboro actually do (or did) exist in and around Hackensack. In addition, Fitzhugh's inspiration for his Boy Scout characters came from several of the boys in the local Scout Troop. While Fitzhugh's characters were involved in adventures that were exciting, they were always plausible. The Roy Blakeley series in particular also featured humorous dialog among its characters that was surprisingly irreverent for its time (one Roy Blakeley book turned on a quixotic hike where the characters were only allowed to turn in one direction, resulting in the characters circling the same lake repeatedly for several chapters before any action took place). These aspects of his stories boosted their popularity and added a component of depth and realism that was lacking in many of the other so called "boys’ series books" of the day. Nearly all of Fitzhugh's Boy Scout books bore the official seal of approval of the BSA.

Fitzhugh's Scouting based books were very popular with children and adults. His characters became so real to his readers that it was not uncommon for Percy to receive fan mail addressed to the characters themselves. Fitzhugh's contribution to the growth and popularity of the Scouting movement can never be measured, but it is widely held that many thousands of boys joined the Scouts because of his writings. His "Pee-wee Harris" character is still being featured in a comic strip in Boys' Life, the official magazine of the Boy Scouts of America, more than seventy years after Fitzhugh's death.

In the 1930s, as the popularity of Fitzhugh's Scouting stories began to wane, he began writing the Hal Keen Mystery Series (10 titles) under the pseudonym Hugh Lloyd, also published by Grosset & Dunlap. The Hal Keen books were followed by another mystery series - Skippy Dare - (3 titles- G&D). Neither of these series achieved the popularity of his earlier Boy Scout work.

Percy Keese Fitzhugh died at his home in Oradell, New Jersey on July 5, 1950, from complications related to a long illness; he was 73.
