= Tenax II =

Tenax II 1938
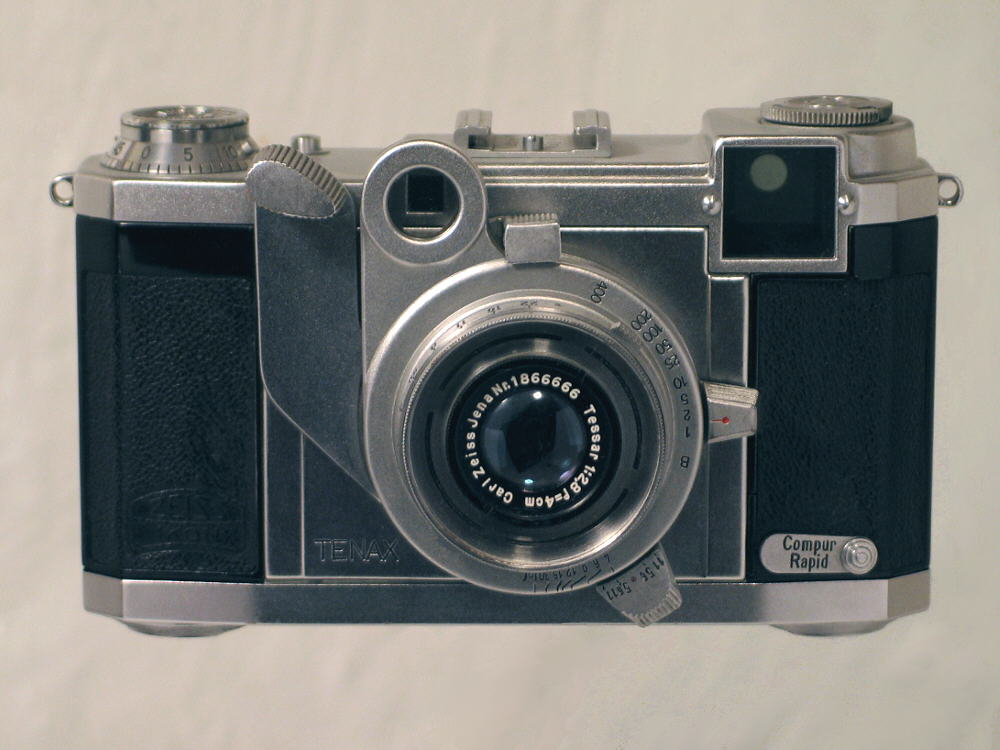

Overview
- Type: 35mm rangefinder camera

Lens
- Lens mount: Tenax bayonet

During the 1930s, Zeiss Ikon (ZI) made a wide range of miniature cameras for the 35mm film format. Most cameras used the standard 24×36 mm frame size, like the Contax, Nettax and Super Nettel. However, the ability to take images in fast sequence was a popular marketing element at the time, and several fast-operating models were made. Among these were the Otto Berning's motor-driven Robot cameras as well as the ZI lever-operated Tenax I and Tenax II. These have the smaller square format of 24×24 mm, enhancing faster frame advance.

The Tenax II is a 35mm RF-camera launched by ZI in 1938. It produces 50 square exposures on a standard length of 35mm film. It has a Compur Rapid shutter, situated just behind the lens, with speeds from 1 to 1/400 second. The camera is wound and the film advanced simultaneously depressing the large lever on the right-hand side of the lens. At first it was only called the Tenax, but the following year a quite different and less sophisticated camera with the same name was launched, both designed by Hubert Nerwin, supposedly based on Otto Berning's original idea. The 1938 model is known as mark II, or just the Tenax II, while the simpler 1939 model, is known as the Tenax I. The "Tenax" name belonged to the C. P. Goerz company in Berlin, being used from 1907 on folding plate cameras and a Vest-pocket camera from 1909. C. P. Goerz became a part of Zeiss Ikon at its formation in 1926. The name was used again by ZI in the 1960s. The Tenax I was continued for a while in the 1950s in East Germany.

The Tenax II has a proprietary bayonet lens mount as a provision for using different lenses, but only a small selection was made available during the few years the camera stayed in production, halted by Germany's war efforts. A small round window in a lateral extension on the lens barrel is aligned up in front of the camera's right-hand rangefinder window. It contains a pair of contra-rotating glass wedges synchronized with the lens focusing lever that provides accurate focusing by aligning a superimposed tinted image with the image in the viewfinder.

STANDARD LENSES:

- Carl Zeiss Jena ... Tessar 1:2,8 f=4cm
- Carl Zeiss Jena ... Sonnar 1:2 f=4cm

ACCESSORY LENSES requiring a separate top mounted Van Albada type finder:

- Carl Zeiss Jena ... Sonnar 1:4 f=7,5cm.
- Carl Zeiss Jena ... Orthometar 1:4,5 f=2,7cm
