= George Winslow =

American actor (1946–2015)

- Born: George Karl Wentzlaff; May 3, 1946; Los Angeles, California, U.S.
- Died: June 13, 2015 (aged 69); Camp Meeker, California, U.S.
- Other name: George "Foghorn" Winslow
- Occupation: Actor
- Years active: 1952–1958

George Karl Wentzlaff, whose stage name was George "Foghorn" Winslow (May 3, 1946 – June 13, 2015), was an American child actor of the 1950s known for his stentorian voice and deadpan demeanor. He appeared in several films, opposite such stars as Marilyn Monroe, Jane Russell, Cary Grant, Ginger Rogers, Dean Martin, and Jerry Lewis. In the late 1950s, he retired from acting.

== Career ==
Nicknamed "Foghorn" for his raspy voice as a slender child with dark blond hair and deep blue eyes, Wentzlaff, a Los Angeles native, broke into the entertainment business on Art Linkletter's family-oriented radio program, People are Funny. Asked his name by Linkletter, the youngster said: "George Wentzlaff, but I'd rather be Casey Jones", with a delivery that cracked up Linkletter and the audience and led to about 20 subsequent appearances on the show.

Actor Cary Grant, who heard the show and was impressed with Wentzlaff's unusual voice and comedy instincts, introduced him to director Norman Taurog, leading to his roles in Grant's films, Room for One More (1952) and Monkey Business (also 1952), which co-stars Ginger Rogers and Marilyn Monroe. Next up was Gentlemen Prefer Blondes (1953), in which Wentzlaff — playing Henry Spofford III, Monroe's young admirer — stole scenes from the actress, including his line about her possessing a "certain animal magnetism". In the comedy Mister Scoutmaster (1953), he traded barbs with Clifton Webb, and he had a small role in the musical comedy Artists and Models (1955), with Dean Martin, Jerry Lewis, Dorothy Malone and newcomer Shirley MacLaine in what blogger Aurora called Wentzlaff's "last 'good' movie." He also appeared in television episodes of The Adventures of Ozzie and Harriet, Blondie and Dear Phoebe. Wentzlaff's final screen appearance came in the feature film, Wild Heritage (1958), cast as 'Talbot Breslin', son to film's lead, Maureen O'Sullivan.

== Personal life and death ==
Retiring from show business at age 12, Wentzlaff finished school, served in the Navy during the Vietnam War, moved to Camp Meeker in the late 1970s and retired from the Postal Service a few years before his death. Wentzlaff died on June 13, 2015, at age 69. His body was found by a friend the following day. Sgt. Cecile Focha, the public information officer for the Sonoma County Sheriff's Office, confirmed the death and no cause had been determined, but he was being treated for heart disease for several years.

A memorial service was held in Petaluma, California, in July 2015, followed by burial with military honors at the Sacramento Valley National Cemetery.

In 2021, George Winslow became the subject of the award-winning short documentary Foghorn: Child Actor, Veteran, Friend, directed and produced by Diana Maciel Sánchez in collaboration with Daniel L. Bernadi.

== Filmography ==
Year	Film	Role	Notes
1952	Room for One More	Teenie	Film debut; the film starred Cary Grant.
1952	Monkey Business	Little Indian	The film starred Cary Grant and Ginger Rogers.
1952	My Pal Gus	Gus Jennings	
1953	Gentlemen Prefer Blondes	Henry Spofford, III	The film starred Marilyn Monroe. His second film for director Howard Hawks.
1953	Mister Scoutmaster	Mike Marshall	Billed as George "Foghorn" Winslow.
1954	The Rocket Man	Timmy	Billed as George "Foghorn" Winslow.
1955	Artists and Models	Richard Stilton	Billed as George "Foghorn" Winslow.
1956	Rock, Pretty Baby	Thomas Daley, III	
1958	Summer Love	Thomas Daley, III	
1958	Wild Heritage	Talbot Breslin	Last film appearance

== Bibliography ==
- Holmstrom, John (1996). The Moving Picture Boy: An International Encyclopaedia from 1895 to 1995. Norwich: Michael Russell. pp. 257–258. ISBN 978-0-8595-5178-6.
- Best, Marc (1971). Those Endearing Young Charms: Child Performers of the Screen. South Brunswick: Barnes & Co. pp. 265–269. ISBN 978-0-4980-7729-6.
