= The Key Word and Other Mysteries =

1977 collection of mystery short stories by Isaac Asimov

- First edition
- Author: Isaac Asimov
- Cover artist: Rod Burke
- Language: English
- Genre: Mystery
- Publisher: Walker & Company
- Publication date: 1977
- Publication place: United States
- Media type: Print (hardcover)
- Pages: 54
- ISBN: 0-8027-6302-2
- Followed by: The Disappearing Man and Other Mysteries

The Key Word and Other Mysteries is a collection of mystery short stories by American author Isaac Asimov, featuring his boy detective Larry. The book was illustrated by Rod Burke. It was first published in hardcover by Walker & Company in 1977, and in paperback by Avon Books in 1979. A British edition illustrated by Geoff Taylor and adding one additional story was issued by Pan Books in 1982.

The book contains five stories by Asimov (six in the British edition). Most were reprinted from magazines, but one, "The Key Word," was written for the book.

Larry appeared in seven other stories, five of which appear in The Disappearing Man and Other Mysteries. (The eleventh Larry story, "Zip Code," from Boys' Life September 1986, does not appear in any book, and the twelfth and final story, "A Friend Calls," was never published.) Of all these stories, "The Thirteenth Day of Christmas" was Asimov's favourite.

== Contents ==
- "The Key Word" (first appeared in this book)
- "Santa Claus Gets a Coin" (Boys' Life, December 1975)
- "Sarah Tops" (Boys' Life, February 1975)
- "The Thirteenth Day of Christmas" (Ellery Queen's Mystery Magazine, July 1977)
- "A Case of Need" (Young World Magazine, October 1975)
- "The Disappearing Man" (British edition only) (Boys' Life, June 1978)

== See also ==
- Time Machine series
