= The Disappearing Man and Other Mysteries =

1985 collection of mystery short stories by Isaac Asimov

- Cover of first edition, 1985
- Author: Isaac Asimov
- Cover artist: Yoshi Miyake
- Language: English
- Genre: Mystery
- Publisher: Walker & Company
- Publication date: 1985
- Publication place: United States
- Media type: Print (hardcover)
- Pages: 50 p.
- ISBN: 0-8027-6578-5
- Preceded by: The Key Word and Other Mysteries

The Disappearing Man and Other Mysteries is a collection of mystery short stories by American author Isaac Asimov, featuring his boy detective Larry. The book was illustrated by Yoshi Miyake and was first published in hardcover by Walker & Company in 1985.

The book contains five stories. Three were reprinted from Boys' Life and the other two were new stories written for the book.

Larry appeared in seven other stories, five of which appear in The Key Word and Other Mysteries. (The eleventh Larry story, "Zip Code," from Boys' Life September 1986, does not appear in any book, and the twelfth and final story, "A Friend Calls," was never published.)

== Contents ==
- "The Disappearing Man" (Boys' Life, June 1978)
- "Lucky Seven" (Boys' Life, September 1982)
- "The Christmas Solution" (Boys' Life, December 1983)
- "The Twins" (first appeared in this book)
- "The Man in the Park" (first appeared in this book)

== See also ==
- Time Machine series
