= Mecaflex =

35mm SLR camera

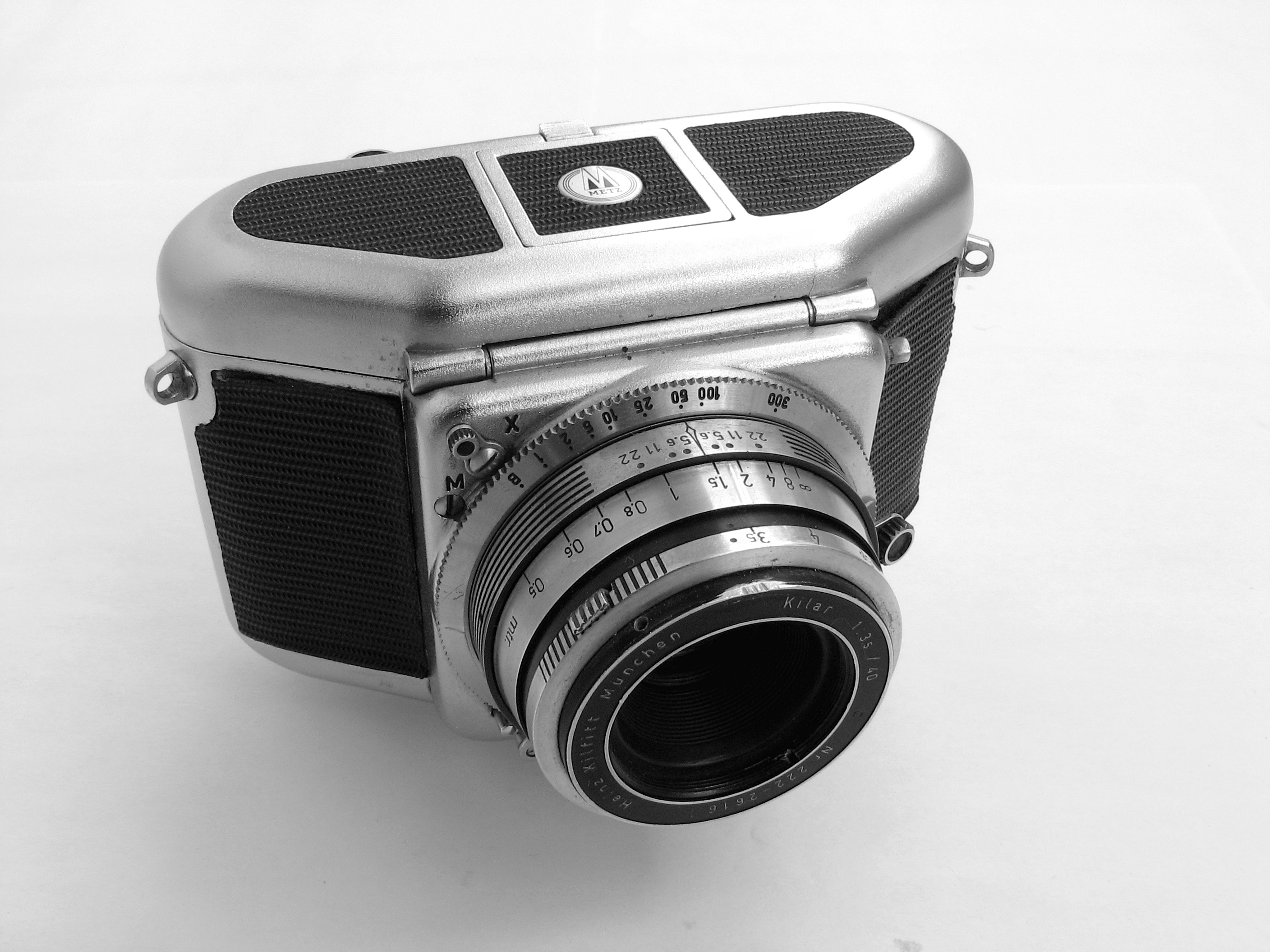
Metz Mecaflex c.1953, with Heinz Kilfitt München Kilar 1:3.5/40

The Mecaflex is a 35mm SLR camera for 50 exposures of 24 × 24 mm. It was presented at the photokina in Cologne in 1951, and launched commercially about two years later. The design is by Heinz Kilfitt, who is also known for designing the original Robot camera and the Kowa Six.

The camera is equipped with the then-newly developed Prontor-Compur (PC) reflex shutter, which would pave the way for reputable camera designs such as the 1953 Contaflex, the 1956 Retina Reflex, the 1957 Hasselblad 500, and the 1959 Voigtländer Bessamatic. However, it does not have the built-in eye-level pentaprism finder, which was first seen on 35mm SLR cameras in 1949. Instead, it has a waist-level finder with a central split-image rangefinder complemented by large full frame magnifier incorporating a central loupe that covers the rangefinder central area.

== Description ==
The complete camera top, hinged at the front, is a flush cover with no protruding controls. When flipped open, it reveals the waist-level finder. On the right-hand side is the single-stroke wind-on lever with the manual reset frame counter on top, and next to it the remote-release-threaded shutter button. On the left-hand side is the rewind knob with a film reminder on top. When the top lid is fully opened, the large square magnifier swings up over the focusing screen. An action finder is also incorporated into the top cover. At the base are the ¼ inch tripod socket, the A/R (advance/rewind) switch, and a release button for the removable back.

The Mecaflex is equipped with a unique breech-lock lens mount operated by a lever at five-o-clock at the front. Sliding the lever toward six-o-clock releases the lens. The shutter speed dial surrounds the lens mount. The semi-automatic preset lens diaphragm is automatically closed by a small protrusion at seven-o-clock at the lens mount, but activated manually by an anti-clockwise turn of the aperture ring while depressing a small release button on it and then returned to the required preset aperture value. In this way, the lens is wide open for bright finder image and ready to instantly close down upon shutter release. A focusing lever is situated on the left-hand lens control. A PC sync. contact is situated at the edge of the lens panel. The Metz manufactured cameras also has an M/X synchronisation selector on the opposite side on the lens panel, and the fastest shutter speed is 1/300 sec.

The Mecaflex is built of precision cast metal alloy parts with a matte chrome finish and decorated with a striped black body covering material. The camera, at first a Metz product for which Kilfitt was to supply the lenses, was manufactured at the Metz Apparatefabrik in Fürth, Germany; but reputedly, due to conflicting interests, the production was taken over by Kilfitt and moved to Monaco in 1958, and manufactured there for another seven years. Apart from the SEROA markings at the top to this effect, these later cameras have a different fine grain body covering material, the shutter speed extend to 1/250 sec. and the M/X flash sync switch is left out, the feature conspicuously missing on the top left of the lens panel.

Kilfitt was a reputable lens manufacturer, well known for designs like the 1955 Macro Kilar series and the manufacture of the Voigtländer 2.8 / 32-86 mm Zoomar. He started lens manufacturing in Munich in 1941 and expanded production to Liechtenstein in 1947, but production was later gathered in Munich. However, only a limited number of lenses were made for the Mecaflex:

- Kilfitt Kilar 1:2.8 F=40 licensed by Benoist Berthiot, Paris
- Kilfitt Kilar 1:3.5 / 40 manufactured by Heinz Kilfitt, München
- Kilfitt Tele-Kilar 1:4 /105

The camera came in a small box complete with a zippered case and a metal neck strap. Accessories included an add-on eyelevel mirror finder that would attach inside the folding finder.

== Two versions ==
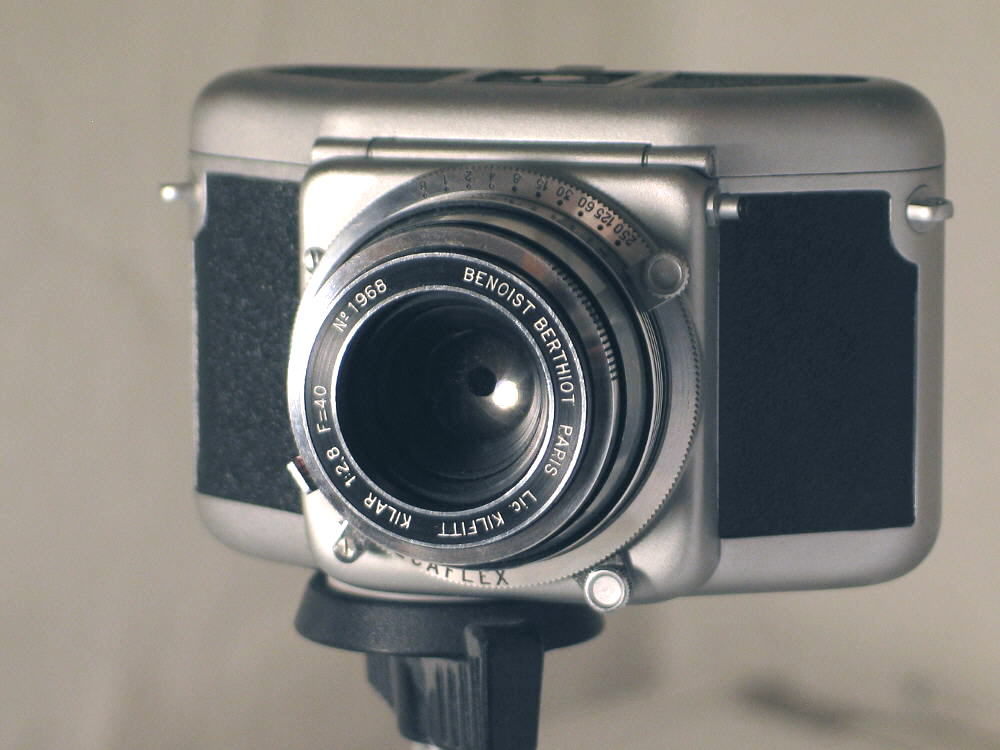
Kilfitt Mecaflex c.1958, with Benoist Berthiot Paris Lic. Kilfitt Kilar 1:2.8 F=40

Metz Mecaflex:

- Manufactured from 1953 on, for about five years
- Shutter speeds B, 1 to 1/300 sec.
- M/X synchronisation selector switch
- Striped pattern body cover

Kilfitt Mecaflex:

- Manufactured in Monaco from 1958 on by SEROA, for about seven years
- Shutter speeds B, 1 to 1/250 sec.
- No M/X synchronisation selector switch
- Fine-grained pattern body cover
