= Mister Scoutmaster =

1953 film by Henry Levin

- Poster
- Directed by: Henry Levin
- Screenplay by: Leonard Praskin; Barney Slater
- Based on: Be Prepared; 1952 novel by Rice E. Cochran (Keith Monroe)
- Produced by: Leonard Goldstein
- Starring: Clifton Webb; Edmund Gwenn; George Winslow
- Cinematography: Joseph LaShelle
- Edited by: William B. Murphy
- Music by: Cyril J. Mockridge
- Production company: 20th Century Fox
- Distributed by: 20th Century-Fox
- Release dates: August 19, 1953 (Los Angeles); August 28, 1953 (New York City); September 2, 1953 (United States)
- Running time: 87 minutes
- Country: United States
- Language: English
- Budget: $795,000
- Box office: $1.6 million (US rentals)

Mister Scoutmaster (also known as Be Prepared) is a 1953 American comedy film directed by Henry Levin and starring Clifton Webb, Frances Dee, Edmund Gwenn and George Winslow. It was written by Leonard Praskin and Barney Slater based on the 1952 novel Be Prepared by Keith Monroe (as Rice E. Cochran).

== Plot ==
An arrogant, aloof television personality gets more than he bargained for when he consents to be leader to a troop of Boy Scouts. The sponsor of Robert Jordan's TV program says he might cancel the show because Jordan appeals only to a middle-aged following and is out of touch with a younger audience.

Jordan takes his troubles home to wife Helen, who wants a child of her own. When he learns that Helen has donated a favorite suit to a Boy Scout clothing drive, Jordan goes to retrieve it, but is flabbergasted when 8-year-old Mike Marshall insists he pay full price for it.

The boy returns the money, impressing the Jordans. When the couple pursue adoption through the local church, Rev. Dr. Stone mentions that the Scout troop is in need of a new scoutmaster. Jordan sees it as a chance to find out more about children, but is appalled by their rowdy behavior. As a Cub Scout, Mike is too young to be a Boy Scout but persists in joining every activity.

Jordan discovers that Mike is an orphan who tries to hide the fact that he lives with an irresponsible aunt in the city's waterfront district. Mike comes to the Scoutmaster's rescue in the woods when Jordan gets trapped inside a sleeping bag at the bottom of a ravine. The Jordans decide to adopt the boy, and Robert's television show is continued.

== Cast ==
- Clifton Webb as Robert Jordan
- Frances Dee as Helen
- Edmund Gwenn as Dr. Stone
- George Winslow as the boy (Mike)
- Veda Ann Borg as blonde
- Orley Lindgren as Ace
- Jimmy Hawkins as Herbie Weber
- Jimmy Moss as Vernon Swanson
- Sammy Ogg as Harold Johnson
- Skip Torgerson as Christy Kerns
- Lee Aaker as Arthur
- Mickey Little as Chick
- Jon Gardner as Larry
- Sarah Selby as Mrs. Weber
- Amanda Randolph as Savannah, the maid

== Production ==
The book Be Prepared came out in 1952 and film rights were bought by Fox who announced it was going to turn it into a film vehicle for Clifton Webb.

Webb collapsed during filming in May 1953. The National Council of the Boy Scouts of America requested some scenes in the script be rewritten.

The film marked Fox's first foray into significant television advertising with a $250,000 campaign.

== Reception ==
Variety called it "a pleasant round of entertainment for the whole family."

The Monthly Film Bulletin wrote: "A promising situation soon deteriorates into a tear-jerking comedy, and the film ends in a riot of sentimental patriotism. George 'Foghorn' Winslow somehow emerges unscathed, but Clifton Webb suffers badly in the process."
