= My Pal Gus =

1952 film by Robert Parrish

- Theatrical release poster
- Directed by: Robert Parrish
- Written by: Fay Kanin; Michael Kanin
- Produced by: Stanley Rubin
- Starring: Richard Widmark; Joanne Dru; Audrey Totter; George Winslow; Joan Banks; Regis Toomey; Ludwig Donath; Ann Morrison; Lisa Golm; Christopher Olsen; Robert Foulk
- Cinematography: Leo Tover
- Edited by: Robert Fritch
- Music by: Leigh Harline
- Production company: Twentieth Century-Fox
- Distributed by: Twentieth Century-Fox
- Release date: November 13, 1952 (Indianapolis)
- Running time: 83 minutes
- Country: United States
- Language: English
- Budget: $725,000
- Box office: $1 million (U.S. rentals)

My Pal Gus is a 1952 American comedy drama film directed by Robert Parrish and starring Richard Widmark, Joanne Dru and Audrey Totter.

== Plot ==
Dave Jennings is so focused on his Los Angeles-based business that he neglects his precocious five-year-old son Gus, who is constantly creating havoc to attract his father's attention. After Gus's latest escapade, Dave orders his long-suffering secretary Ivy Tolliver to find a new nurse for Gus, then leaves on a business trip. Upon his return, Dave learns that Ivy has placed Gus in the Playtime School and that he must meet with the teacher, Lydia Marble, to formally enroll Gus. After Lydia explains that parents are required to participate in their child's education at Playtime, Dave indignantly states that he knows all that he needs to know about Gus. Dave is amazed by how well Gus responds to Lydia's instructions after Gus smacks a schoolmate. Believing that Gus can benefit from Lydia's tutelage, Dave agrees to keep him at Playtime. As the next three weeks pass, Gus becomes contented and well-behaved, but on parent participation day, Dave sends toys to the school instead of attending. Lydia returns the toys with a note admonishing Dave that the toys are no substitute for his attention, and when Dave comes to the school to protest, Lydia assumes that he is there to help.

Dave tells Lydia that e has fallen in love with her, and although Lydia returns Dave's affections, she tells him that his feelings stem from his dependence upon her for help with Gus. That night, Dave comforts a frightened Gus by allowing him to sleep in his bed, and, realizing that he no longer needs Lydia for instruction on child care, confronts her with his new knowledge. Secure that Dave does indeed love her for herself, Lydia enjoys his embrace. As time passes, Dave becomes a devoted father, and his romance with Lydia blossoms into an engagement.

On Gus's birthday, Dave's broke, immoral ex-wife Joyce appears and claims that their Mexican divorce is not legal. Dave's lawyer Farley Norris confirms the upsetting news, but Dave, infuriated by Joyce's reappearance, refuses to give her money to obtain a legal divorce. Determined to win, no matter what is revealed about Joyce in court, Dave does not heed the pleas of his friends that he consider Gus and end the disagreement quietly. Dave instead hires private detectives to gather ammunition against Joyce before the trial.

Joyce's lawyer falsely charges Dave with adultery and also names Lydia. The resulting publicity horrifies Lydia, and she is forced to close her school. Lydia confronts Dave, accusing him of caring more about his fortune than about his son, and breaks their engagement. As the trial continues, Farley proves that Joyce abandoned Dave, and the judge upholds Dave's request for a divorce and grants Joyce custody of Gus. Dave is heartbroken, and on the morning that he is to surrender Gus to Joyce, Gus pleads to remain with him. Realizing that Gus is more important to him than anything else, Dave confronts Joyce and agrees to her demand for everything that he owns in exchange for permanent custody. Lydia promises to help Dave fight for his son.

== Cast ==
- Richard Widmark as Dave Jennings
- Joanne Dru as Lydia Marble
- Audrey Totter as Joyce Jennings
- George Winslow as Gus Jennings
- Regis Toomey as Farley Norris
- Carl Betz as Mr. Nelson (uncredited)

== Production ==
The film's first working title was How High Is Up? In preproduction, the title was The Problem Is Love, which was changed to Big Man just before production began on May 12, 1952. Filming wrapped by mid-June and the title was changed to My Pal Gus before its November premiere.

== Release ==
My Pal Gus premiered at the Circle Theatre in Indianapolis, Indiana on November 13, 1952. Indiana-based McAfee Candies produced a special My Pal Gus candy bar for national distribution in coordination with the premiere.

== Reception ==
In a contemporary review for the Los Angeles Times, critic Edwin Schallert of the Los Angeles Times wrote: "ln a better day of moviegoing the picture might have pleased a rather large audience of both men and women. Today it will have to be relegated to the filler-in class, agreeable and well themed as much of the film may be. Incidentally a scene or two verges on suggestion and vulgarity which were routed out of pictures some years ago. Widmark's flair for characterization finely sustains the impression that he makes in his role. While you are sympathetic toward the man he portrays you recognize his faults, which is just as it should he, and proves the integrity of Widmark's work when he is given an opportunity of this sort."
