= Wild Heritage =

1958 film by Charles F. Haas

- Directed by: Charles F. Haas (as Charles Haas)
- Screenplay by: Paul King; Joseph Stone
- Based on: Steve Frazee
- Produced by: John E. Horton
- Starring: Will Rogers, Jr. Maureen O'Sullivan; Rod McKuen
- Cinematography: Philip H. Lathrop
- Edited by: Edward Mann
- Color process: Eastmancolor
- Production company: Universal International Pictures
- Distributed by: Universal Pictures
- Release date: August 1958
- Running time: 78 minutes
- Country: United States
- Language: English

Wild Heritage is a 1958 American CinemaScope Western film directed by Charles F. Haas and starring Will Rogers, Jr., Maureen O'Sullivan and Rod McKuen.

== Plot ==
Emma Breslin (O'Sullivan) and her family cross the plains in a covered wagon. They make the fateful decision to pause in a lawless western town where Emma's husband, Jake (Paul Birch), is shot by rustlers Arn (John Beradino) and Jud. But folksy Judge Copeland (Rogers) persuades them to go on. At Break Wagon Hill, their wagon does just that and they decide to homestead on the spot.

The movie follows the trials and joys of Emma and her family, as well as those of their neighbors, the Bascombs (Donahue and Jeanette Nolan). Finally, violence reappears when Arn and Jud show up on their homestead, leading to a showdown with the Breslin Boys (McKuen, Gary Gray and George Winslow).

== Cast ==
- Will Rogers, Jr. as Judge Copeland
- Maureen O'Sullivan as Emma Breslin
- Rod McKuen as Dirk Breslin
- Casey Tibbs as Rusty - Trail Boss
- Judi Meredith as Callie Bascomb (as Judy Meredith)
- Troy Donahue as Jesse Bascomb
- George Winslow as Talbot Breslin
- Gigi Perreau as 'Missouri' Breslin
- Gary Gray as Hugh Adam David Breslin
- Jeanette Nolan as Ma (Janet) Bascomb
- Paul Birch as Jake Birch
- John Beradino as Arn - Rustler
- Phil Harvey as Jud - Rustler
- Lawrence Dobkin as Josh Burrage
- Stephen Ellsworth as Bolivar Bascomb
- Ingrid Goude as Hilda Jansen - Blacksmith's Daughter
- Christoper Dark as Brazos - Trail Drive Cowhand
- Guy Wilkerson as Chaco - Trail Drive Cook

== See also ==
- List of American films of 1958
