= Time Machine series =

- Illustration by Charles Hawes for The Day We Explored the Future
- Owner: Boys' Life
- Created: 1959

The Time Machine series of science fiction stories for young adults, published between 1959 and 1989 in Boys' Life magazine, featured a group of American Boy Scouts who acquire an abandoned time machine. The Polaris Patrol visited the future and the past, sometimes recruiting new Scouts. The stories used the time machine as a framework for history lessons, but also explored the consequences of having a time machine (as well as the various technologies the boys who discovered it obtain from the future).

The author was given as Donald Keith for most of the stories, a pseudonym for the father-and-son team of Donald and Keith Monroe. In later years, some stories were credited just to the son, Keith Monroe.

The first story in the series was "The Day We Explored the Future", appearing in the December 1959 Boys' Life on page 18.

Some of the stories were collected in two books: Mutiny in the Time Machine and Time Machine to the Rescue, with Donald Keith listed as the author. All the Time Machine stories are available from Google Books in its collection of Boys' Life issues.

== Recurring characters ==
- Bob Tucker, patrol leader (often the story narrator)
- Ellsworth "Brains" Baynes, brilliant bookworm who operates the Machine
- Kai Beezee Tentroy, recruited from a city called Troy in 4000 A.D.
- Dion, recruited from ancient Sparta
- Rodney Carver, an impetuous tenderfoot

== Stories in Boys' Life ==
In the following table, "DK" indicates that the story's author is listed as Donald Keith, while "KM" means attribution to Keith Monroe. Links are to the copies available at Google Books.

Issue	Title	Author	Serial dates
December 1959	The Day We Explored the Future. December 1959.	DK	
February 1960	The Time Machine Flies Backwards. February 1960.	DK	
June 1960	How We Got the Mind-Reading Pills. June 1960.	DK	
July 1960	Our Time Machine at the Jamboree. July 1960.	DK	
October 1961	Marco Polo and Our Time Machine. October 1961.	DK	
February 1962	The Time Machine Slips a Cog. February 1962.	DK	
December 1962	Mutiny in the Time Machine Part 1. December 1962.	DK	Dec 1962 to Mar 1963 (4-part serial)
January 1963	Mutiny in the Time Machine Part 2. January 1963.	DK	Dec 1962 to Mar 1963 (4-part serial)
February 1963	Mutiny in the Time Machine Part 3. February 1963.	DK	Dec 1962 to Mar 1963 (4-part serial)
March 1963	Mutiny in the Time Machine Part 4. March 1963.	DK	Dec 1962 to Mar 1963 (4-part serial)
June 1964	The Time Machine Cracks a Safe. June 1964.	DK	
October 1964	Time Machine to the Rescue. October 1964.	DK	
February 1965	The Time Machine Gets Stuck Part 1. February 1965.	DK	Feb 1965 to Apr 1965 (3-part serial)
March 1965	The Time Machine Gets Stuck Part 2. March 1965.	DK	Feb 1965 to Apr 1965 (3-part serial)
April 1965	The Time Machine Gets Stuck Part 3. April 1965.	DK	Feb 1965 to Apr 1965 (3-part serial)
April 1967	The Time Machine Hunts a Treasure Part 1. April 1967.	DK	Apr 1967 to Jun 1967 (3-part serial)
May 1967	The Time Machine Hunts a Treasure Part 2. May 1967.	DK	Apr 1967 to Jun 1967 (3-part serial)
June 1967	The Time Machine Hunts a Treasure Part 3. June 1967.	DK	Apr 1967 to Jun 1967 (3-part serial)
December 1968	The Dog from the Time Machine. December 1968.	DK	
September 1970	The Time Machine and the Generation Gap. September 1970.	DK	
August 1971	The King and the Time Machine. August 1971.	DK	
February 1973	The Time Machine Cleans Up. February 1973.	DK	
August 1973	The Time Machine Twins the Jamboree. August 1973.	KM	
December 1973	Santa Claus and the Time Machine. December 1973.	DK	
November 1974	The Time Machine Fights Earthquakes. November 1974.	KM	
April 1975	The Time Machine Saves a Patriot. April 1975.	KM	
July 1976	The Time Machine Kidnaps a Parade. July 1976.	KM	
September 1988	Target Timbuktu. September 1988.	KM	
February 1989	Why We Kidnapped our Scoutmaster. February 1989.	KM	
September 1989	A Pirate took our Time Machine. September 1989.	KM	

== See also ==
- The Time Machine
- The Disappearing Man and Other Mysteries
- The Key Word and Other Mysteries
