= Donald Keith (author) =

Pseudonym of American authors Donald and Keith Monroe

Donald Keith was a pseudonym for authors Donald (1888–1972) and Keith Monroe (1915–2003). They are best known for their series of stories in the Time Machine series, which were originally published in Boys' Life magazine between 1959 and 1989. Some of the stories were combined into two books, Mutiny in the Time Machine (1963) and Time Machine to the Rescue (1967).

A few stories later in the series were written by Keith Monroe alone. The works of Donald Keith were often Keith Monroe's earlier attempts, with which his father, Donald Monroe, helped him. As a result, both men amalgamated their forenames into the pen name "Donald Keith" in order to credit both.

Donald Keith also contributed stories to Galaxy Science Fiction and Blue Book.

== Time Machine stories in Boys' Life ==
Key to "Byline"

DK – stated author is Donald Keith, the duo
KM – stated author is Keith Monroe, the son

Month	Year	Title	Byline	Serial dates
DEC	1959	The Day We Explored the Future	DK	
FEB	1960	The Time Machine Files Backwards	DK	
JUN	1960	How We Got the Mind-Reading Pills	DK	
JUL	1960	Our Time Machine at the Jamboree	DK	
OCT	1961	Marco Polo and Our Time Machine	DK	
FEB	1962	The Time Machine Slips a Cog	DK	
DEC	1962	Mutiny in the Time Machine	DK	Dec 1962 to Mar 1963 (4-part serial)
JUN	1964	The Time Machine Cracks a Safe	DK	
OCT	1964	Time Machine to the Rescue	DK	
FEB	1965	The Time Machine Gets Stuck	DK	Feb 1965 to Apr 1965 (3-part serial)
APR	1967	The Time Machine Hunts a Treasure	DK	Apr 1967 to Jun 1967 (3-part serial)
DEC	1968	The Dog from the Time Machine	DK	
SEP	1970	The Time Machine and the Generation Gap	DK	
AUG	1971	The King and the Time Machine	DK	
FEB	1973	The Time Machine Cleans Up	DK	
AUG	1973	The Time Machine Twins the Jamboree	KM	
DEC	1973	Santa Claus and the Time Machine	DK	
NOV	1974	The Time Machine Fights Earthquakes	KM	
APR	1975	The Time Machine Saves a Patriot	KM	
JUL	1976	The Time Machine Kidnaps a Parade	KM	
SEP	1988	Target Timbuktu	KM	
FEB	1989	Why We Kidnapped Our Scoutmaster	KM	
SEP	1989	A Pirate Took Our Time Machine!	KM	

== Published books ==
- Donald Keith (1963). Mutiny in the Time Machine. Random House.
- Donald Keith (1967). Time Machine to the Rescue. illustrated by Albert Orbaan. Putnam.
