= The Rocket Man (1954 film) =

1954 film by Oscar Rudolph

- Theatrical release poster
- Directed by: Oscar Rudolph
- Screenplay by: Lenny Bruce; Jack Henley
- Story by: George W. George; George F. Slavin
- Produced by: Leonard Goldstein
- Starring: Charles Coburn; Spring Byington; Anne Francis; John Agar; George "Foghorn" Winslow
- Cinematography: John Seitz
- Edited by: Paul Weatherwax
- Color process: Black and white
- Production company: Panoramic Productions
- Distributed by: 20th Century Fox
- Release date: April 1954
- Running time: 79 minutes
- Country: United States
- Language: English

The Rocket Man is a 1954 American comedy science fiction film directed by Oscar Rudolph and starring Charles Coburn, Spring Byington, Anne Francis, John Agar and George "Foghorn" Winslow. The script was co-written by Lenny Bruce and Jack Henley from a story by George W. George and George F. Slavin. A comedy with science fiction overtones, the film carries the tag line, “Out-of-this-world laughter and down-to-earth charm when the face from space turns out to be… the kid next door!”

The New York Times found the fact that comedian Lenny Bruce was one of the film's screenwriters was the "strangest aspect of the low-budget production", noting that the film contains little of Bruce's trademark humor.

== Plot ==
As a result of the sudden and unexplained appearance of a mysterious rocket man, a little boy comes into possession of a mysterious ray gun that compels anyone caught in its beam to tell the truth. He uses it to prevent his orphanage from being foreclosed upon by creditors and to help a young couple fall in love.

== Cast ==
- Charles Coburn as Mayor Ed Johnson
- Spring Byington as Justice Amelia Brown
- Anne Francis as June Brown
- John Agar as Tom Baxter
- George Winslow as Timmy (as George "Foghorn" Winslow)
- Stanley Clements as Bob
- Emory Parnell as Big Bill Watkins
- June Clayworth as Harriet Snedley
- Don Haggerty as Officer Mike O'Brien
- Beverly Garland as Ludine

== Critical reception ==
Writing in AllMovie, critic Hal Erickson described the film as "essentially an Andy Hardyesque comedy drama with a peripheral sci-fi slant," and that despite having Lenny Bruce as a co-screenwriter, "there's nothing scatalogical or even satirical in the film itself." Film critic Derek Winnert wrote that "any acid wit, high-spirited fun or real charm are sorely lacking from director Oscar Rudolph’s lame, would-be whimsical" film, adding that it is an "often very silly and mostly boring movie, though the cast have charm and the skills to save it."
