= Monkey Business (1952 film) =

1952 film by Howard Hawks

- Theatrical release poster
- Directed by: Howard Hawks
- Screenplay by: Ben Hecht; Charles Lederer; I. A. L. Diamond
- Story by: Harry Segall
- Produced by: Sol C. Siegel
- Starring: Cary Grant; Ginger Rogers; Charles Coburn; Marilyn Monroe
- Cinematography: Milton Krasner
- Edited by: William B. Murphy
- Music by: Leigh Harline
- Production company: 20th Century-Fox
- Distributed by: 20th Century-Fox
- Release date: September 5, 1952
- Running time: 97 minutes
- Country: United States
- Language: English
- Box office: $2 million (US rentals)

Monkey Business is a 1952 American screwball comedy film directed by Howard Hawks and starring Cary Grant, Ginger Rogers, Charles Coburn, and Marilyn Monroe. To avoid confusion with the unrelated 1931 Marx Brothers film of the same name, the film is sometimes billed as Howard Hawks' Monkey Business.

== Plot ==
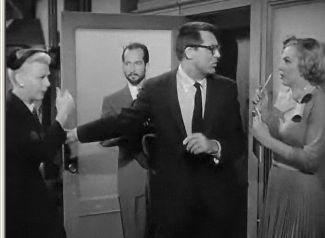
Ginger Rogers, Robert Cornthwaite, Cary Grant, and Marilyn Monroe in Monkey Business

Dr. Barnaby Fulton, an absent-minded research chemist for the Oxly chemical company, is trying to develop an elixir of youth. Stumped, he is too distracted in thought to go out to a dinner his wife Edwina has much anticipated, the spark of their marriage having been dimmed by his obsession with his work.

At his job, he is urged on vigorously by his commercially minded boss, Oliver Oxly. One of Barnaby's chimpanzees, Esther, breaks loose in the laboratory, mixes a beaker of chemicals, and pours the mix into the water cooler. The chemicals have the rejuvenating effect that Barnaby is seeking.

Unaware of Esther's antics, Barnaby tests his latest experimental concoction on himself, followed by a drink of water from the cooler. He soon begins to act like a 20-year-old and spends the day out on the town with his boss's comely young secretary, Lois Laurel. When Edwina learns that the serum works, she drinks some, along with water from the cooler, and transforms into a prankish schoolgirl.

Edwina places an impetuous phone call to her old flame and family lawyer, Hank Entwhistle. Her mother, who is unaware of the chemical influence that causes Edwina's actions, believes that Edwina is unhappy in her marriage and wants a divorce. Barnaby and Edwina go to the laboratory the next morning to destroy the formula. However, they unwittingly consume it by using the contaminated water cooler to make coffee. Oxly and the board try to buy the formula from Barnaby while he is under its influence.

Barnaby plays with a group of children pretending to be Indians. Meanwhile, Edwina falls asleep and awakens to find a baby next to her. She mistakenly believes that the baby is Barnaby having overdosed on the formula, but the baby is actually under the care of the Fultons' housekeeper. Oxly and she attempt to find an antidote, and Edwina tries to coax the baby to sleep, hoping that it will reverse the formula's effects. Numerous scientists and Mr. Oxly drink the water at the laboratory and revert to a second childhood. Barnaby crawls into the laboratory through the window and lies down to sleep next to the baby. Edwina discovers him and realizes her mistake.

Later at home, as Barnaby, who has been offered a new contract by Oxly, prepares for an evening with Edwina, their spirits and marriage renewed, Barnaby notes, "you're old only when you forget you're young."

== Cast ==
- Cary Grant as Dr. Barnaby Fulton
- Ginger Rogers as Edwina Fulton
- Charles Coburn as Oliver Oxly
- Marilyn Monroe as Lois Laurel
- Hugh Marlowe as Hank Entwhistle
- Henri Letondal as Dr. Jerome Kitzel
- Robert Cornthwaite as Dr. Zoldeck
- Larry Keating as G. J. Culverly
- Douglas Spencer as Dr. Brunner
- Esther Dale as Mrs. Rhinelander
- George Winslow as a little cowboy
- Kathleen Freeman as Mrs. Brannigan (uncredited)
- Harry Carey Jr. as a reporter (uncredited)
- Howard Hawks as the voice at the start of the film that says to Cary Grant not to open the door yet (uncredited)

== Reception ==
On the review aggregator website Rotten Tomatoes, the film holds an approval rating of 74% based on 27 reviews, with an average score of 6.8/10.

Hawks said he did not think the film's premise was believable, and as a result thought the film was not as funny as it could have been. Peter Bogdanovich noted in 2011 that the scenes with Cary Grant and Marilyn Monroe work especially well and lamented that Ginger Rogers plays the female lead role instead of Monroe. However, Gregory Lamb of The Christian Science Monitor described Rogers as "a comedienne par excellence" in the film.

Jay Carmody of the Washington Evening Star offered a lukewarm contemporary review, stating, "Dreary business is what it really is. Farce writing can be a treacherous trade...and not even the insurance represented by Miss Rogers, Grant, and Marilyn Monroe can provide adequate protection in cases like Monkey Business...Miss Rogers and Grant, a pair of gifted farceurs, earn a kind of grudging admiration for giving such a courageous try at such unrewarding material as 'Monkey Business' provides them...In the presence of such silky performers as the picture's veterans, [Monroe's] acting has apparently climbed no higher than one degree above zero but no one will care." Leslie Halliwell stated in 1989: "Remarkably laboured comedy by and with top people; it can't fail to have funny moments, but they are few and far between." Pauline Kael wasn't impressed in her 1991 compendium of movies she had seen: "Grating screwball farce ... boisterous, labored whimsey ... "
