= Heinz Kilfitt =

German camera designer

Heinz Kilfitt was born on 29 May 1898 in Hörntrop-Wattenscheid, Germany; he died on 11 August 1980 in Munich, Germany. He is probably best known for the design of the spring driven 35mm Robot still cameras taking 24×24mm frames on 135 film as well as being a lens maker, renowned for the Macro-Kilars and the manufacture of the Voigtländer Zoomar that was designed by Frank Gerhardt Back (1902-1981).

He was the son of a watchmaker and christened Heinrich Wilhelm Kilfitt. He spent his early youth repairing watches and taking an interest in optics and photography. At the optical company R. Neumann in Berlin he was hired as the head of the Photography department. Combining his watch repair and photography skills he designed the spring driven Robot camera for H. H. Berning in 1930 for fast series of single frame photographs. In the early 1950s he conceived the very compact 35mm SLR Mecaflex camera to be manufactured by Metz Apparatefabik in Fürth, Germany. In 1964 he established the Kilfitt Optische Fabrik in Munich.
