= Dutch Bill Creek =

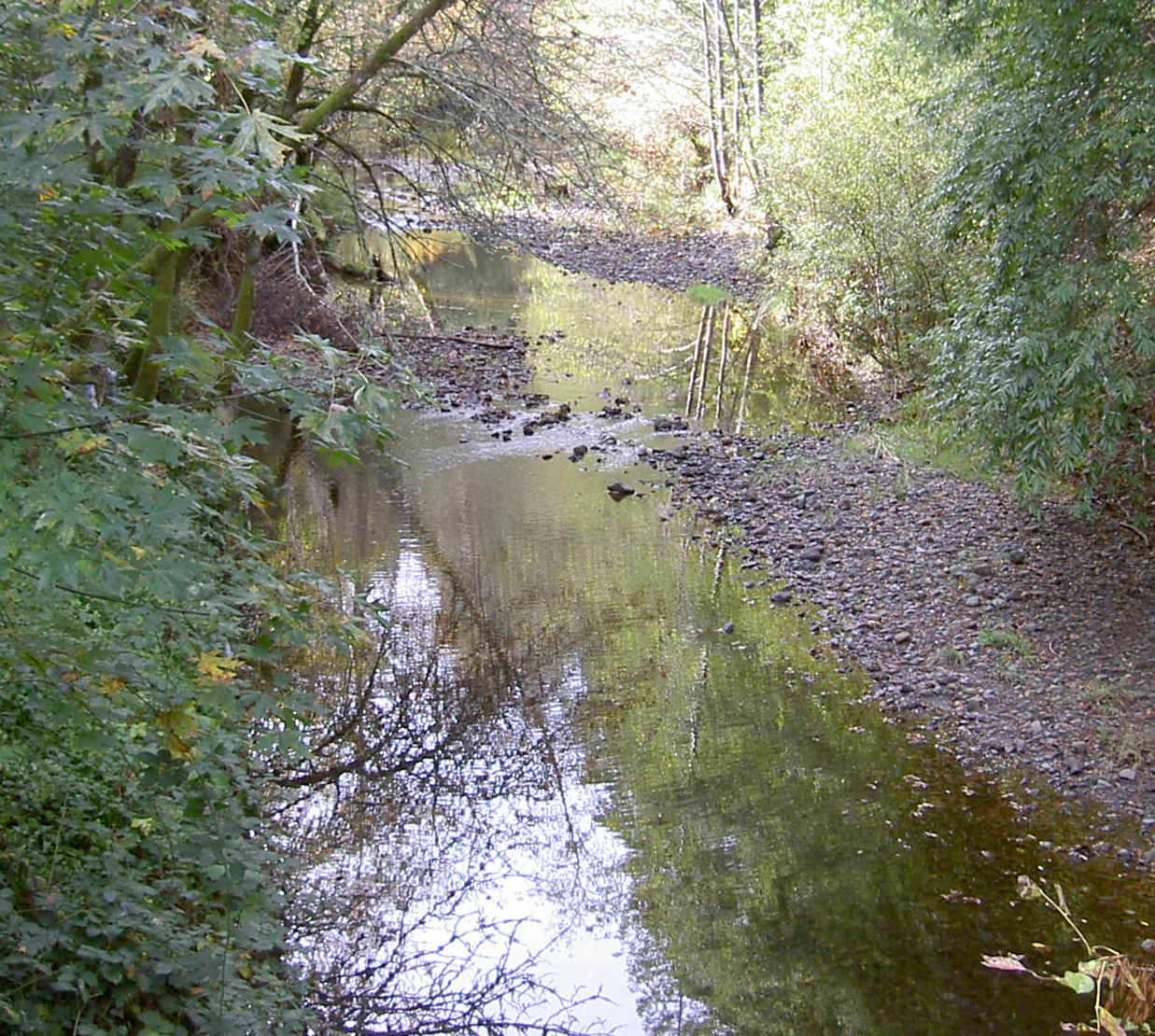
- Dutch Bill Creek 2009
- Etymology: "Dutch Bill" Howard

Location
- Country: United States
- State: California
- Region: Sonoma County
- Cities: Monte Rio, Camp Meeker

Physical characteristics
- Source
  - location: north of Occidental, California
  - coordinates: 38°24′44″N 122°57′3″W
  - elevation: 522 ft (159 m)
- Mouth: Russian River
  - location: Monte Rio, California
  - coordinates: 38°27′56″N 123°0′35″W
  - elevation: 7 ft (2.1 m)

Dutch Bill Creek is a 6.5-mile-long (10.5 km) north-flowing stream in the hills of western Sonoma County, California, which empties into the Russian River at Monte Rio about 7 miles (11 km) from the Pacific Ocean.

== Course ==
Dutch Bill Creek parallels the Bohemian Highway from the town of Occidental to Monte Rio. It originates just north of Occidental and descends to the north. Lancel Creek enters from the east just south of the town of Camp Meeker. Dutch Bill Creek continues through Camp Meeker, where it turns to the northwest, receiving the outflow of Baumert Springs. Alder Creek, Grub Creek, and Duvoul Creek enter from the right. Then the creek flows through Westminster Woods before feeding into the Russian River at Monte Rio, just west of the Bohemian Grove.

== History ==
"Dutch Bill" Howard (born 1823) was a Danish seaman who jumped ship at San Francisco Bay in 1849 and started a new life as a homesteader near the source of this creek. In the 1870s, the North Pacific Coast Railroad was built through the valley. In return for donating right-of-way to the railroad, Howard received a lifetime railway pass and got a station named after him.

== Habitat and pollution ==
As of 2000, Dutch Bill Creek and several of its tributaries supported steelhead trout.

As of December 2001, one year class of Wild Coho Salmon have been spawning in Dutch Bill Creek. In 2002 Dutch Bill Creek has been part of the captive broadstock program and since 2006 juvenile coho have been released in DBC as a part of this program.

In 2000 recommendations to improve salmonid habitat in Dutch Bill Creek were made following a 2007 habitat inventory conducted in accordance with the methodology presented in the California Salmonid Stream Habitat Restoration Manual. In 2009, the Gold Ridge Resource Conservation District (GRRCD), working with the Camp Meeker Recreation and Park District, removed the Camp Meeker Dam which had been identified as one of the worst barriers to salmon and steelhead passage in the Russian River Watershed. Camp Meeker Dam had been built in the 1950s to create a seasonal swimming hole and beach area. In place of the dam, a prefabricated 80 foot steel pedestrian bridge was installed, improving public access across the creek, and stream banks were stabilized and revegetated, along with creation of a more natural meander and grade change. These improvements will help return the natural transport of gravel from upstream and provide better fish habitat. The GRRCD also removed a culvert barrier to fish passage at Market Street in nearby Occidental, California.

== Bridges ==
Dutch Bill Creek is spanned by several bridges:

- Main Street in Monte Rio crosses on a pair of concrete continuous slabs built in 1953 and 1975
- Fir Road in Monte Rio crosses on a 98-foot (30 m) steel bridge built in 1974
- Market Street crosses on a 27-foot (8 m) concrete culvert built in 1958
- Bohemian Highway crosses 5.4 miles south of State Route 116 on a 26-foot (8 m) concrete slab built in 1935.

== See also ==
- List of watercourses in the San Francisco Bay Area
