= Pee-Wee Harris =

Pee-wee Harris
- Pee-Wee with his friend Westy (right) in 1983
- First appearance: 1915
- Created by: Percy Keese Fitzhugh
- Portrayed by: Al Gar Bloom

In-universe information
- Alias: Walter Harris
- Nickname: Pee-wee
- Gender: male
- Title: First Class Scout
- Occupation: Boy Scout
- Religion: Christian

Walter "Pee-wee" Harris is a fictional Boy Scout who has appeared in several series of boy's books by Percy Keese Fitzhugh as well as in a long-running comic strip in the magazine Boys' Life. Originally spelled "Pee-wee", his name has occasionally been spelled "Pee-Wee" and is spelled "Pee Wee" in the Boys' Life comic strip.

== Background ==
Pee-wee Harris first appeared in 1915 as a supporting character in Fitzhugh's series of novels about the Boy Scouts of "Troop 1, Bridgeboro, NJ". Though Pee-wee is small of stature and young of age, he is the quintessential First Class Boy Scout. He is almost always wearing one of his many Scout uniforms, and carries a compass, a pocketknife, a belt axe, and some food to appease his never-ending appetite. His fellow Scouts would say that "Pee-wee is not in the Boy Scouts, the Boy Scouts are in him."

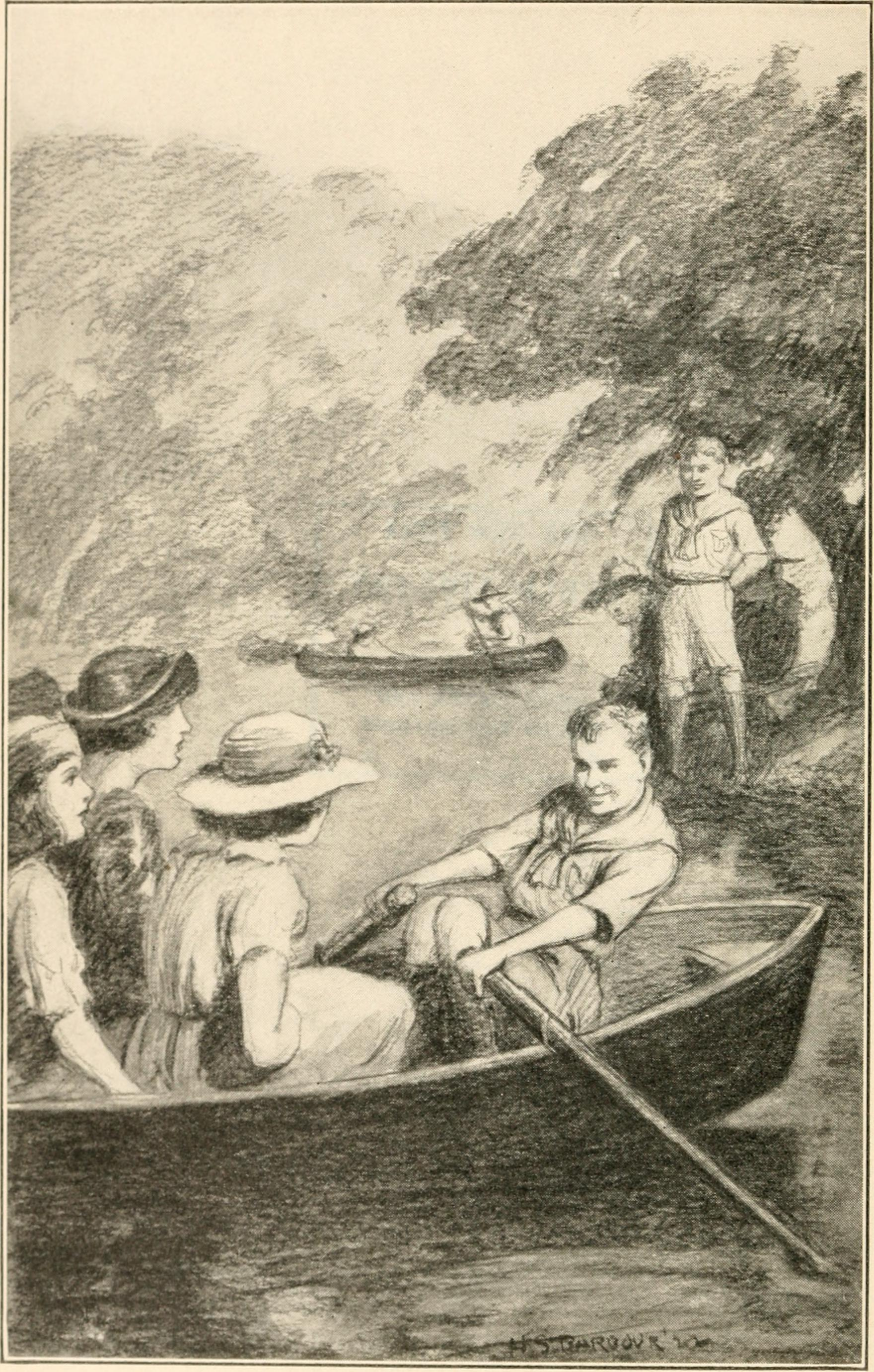
Pee-wee Harris Adrift (1922)

His adventures were so numerous that in 1922, Pee-wee was given a book series of his own. The series revolves around him using Scouting skills such as signaling and stalking to have adventures and solve mysteries. The hero of these stories usually gets himself into predicaments through his enthusiasm for the Scout way and his noble intentions. However, Pee-wee is the kind of boy who always lands on his feet. He takes a situation that he manages to screw up. Yet his zeal, Scout knowledge, and luck, always seems to come out on top. "Even when he loses, he wins".

The series also featured other Scouts from the "First Bridgeboro Troop" such as Tom Slade, Roy Blakeley, and Westy Martin, who each also had their own series of books, the first two preceding the Pee-wee series and the last following it. The Pee-wee Harris book series ran until 1930.

Like many of the Scouts in Fitzhugh's novels, Pee-wee was based on a real person. In Pee-wee's case – one Al Gar Bloom, whose father ran a newsstand near Fitzhugh's studio in Hackensack, New Jersey. Al, himself a Scout, would regularly pester Mr. Fitzhugh to see the manuscripts before they were sent off to his publisher. When the Pee-wee Harris series began; Al was the natural choice as the Scout who would grace the cover of the first volume. Al lived in Hackensack for many years, eventually becoming a reporter for the Bergen Evening Record. In an interview given in the 1970s, Al had this to say about PKF's books: "Fitzhugh’s books – moral, humorous – were well suited to my generation just as the Rover Boys, Horatio Alger and Oliver Optic were rigidly keyed to the moral tone and drive for material success of their respective eras."

== Books ==
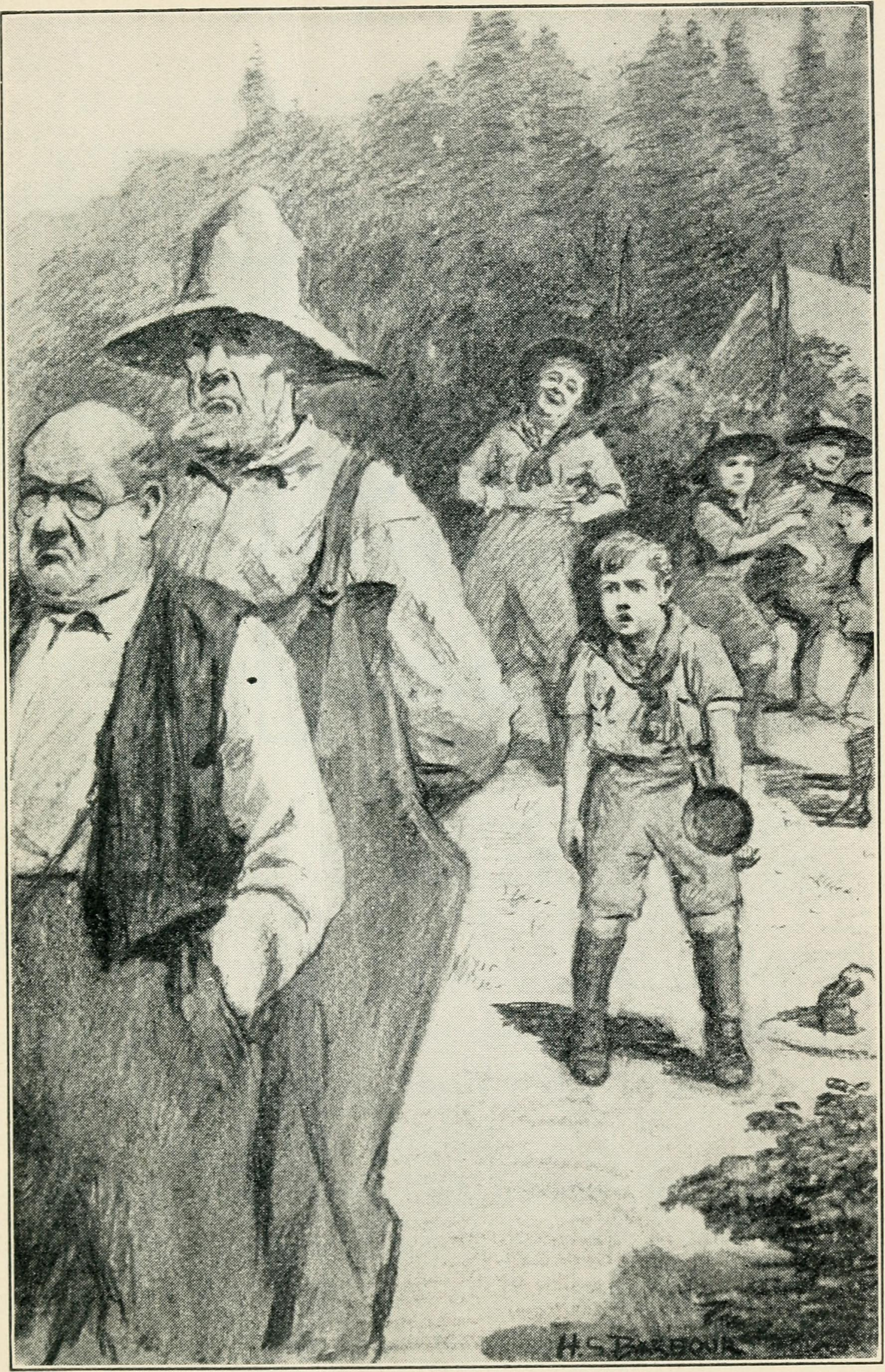
Pee-wee Harris on the Trail (1922)

Thirteen Pee-wee Harris books were published by Grosset & Dunlap between 1922 and 1930:

- Pee-wee Harris (1922)
- Pee-wee Harris on the Trail (1922)
- Pee-wee Harris in Camp (1922)
- Pee-wee Harris in Luck (1922)
- Pee-wee Harris Adrift (1922)
- Pee-wee Harris F.O.B. Bridgeboro (1923)
- Pee-wee Harris: Fixer (1924)
- Pee-wee Harris: As Good As His Word (1925)
- Pee-wee Harris: Mayor For A Day (1926); serialized in Boys' Life as "Pee-Wee's Patrol"
- Pee-wee Harris and the Sunken Treasure (1927)
- Pee-wee Harris on the Briny Deep (1928)
- Pee-wee Harris in Darkest Africa (1929)
- Pee-wee Harris Turns Detective (1930)

In addition, these two stories are known to exist:

- "Pee-wee Harris Warrior Bold" (1930) - published as a serial in Boys' Life magazine
- "Pee-wee's Gold Brick" - an unpublished manuscript

Around 1935 Grosset & Dunlap sold the rights to the first two Pee-wee Harris books to Whitman Publishing. These books, along with 4 other Fitzhugh titles, were added to their extensive "2300" series of books for young adults. They remained in their catalog until the 1950s.

An abridged audio book of the seminal novel was published in December 2009.

== Boys' Life ==
In April 1920, The book "Roy Blakely's Camp on Wheels" was serialized in Boys' Life magazine. The story featured Pee-wee and ran for eight issues. Several other issues featured Fitzhugh's serialized books. In 1952, Pee-wee made the transition to the comic strip, appearing in the "Pee Wee Harris" comic strip in Boys' Life (September issue). This was when his name was first spelled with the capital "W" and the hyphen was removed. This project was begun by editor and writer, Alfred B. Stenzel, who was given the task of capturing the essence of Pee-Wee's character. The first artist was Bill Williams who drew it from 1952 to 1963. The strip originally carried the byline "by Percy K. Fitzhugh" even though Fitzhugh had died in 1950.

The comic strip originally followed storylines from the books. Over the years, it has changed in both artistic style and storyline. Westy Martin from Fitzhugh's original stories transferred over to comics. In the latest incarnations of the strip, relatively new characters named Sam, Chubb, and Carlos appear in supporting roles. Responsibility for the strip has been handed down over the years, and previous artists include Manny Stallman and Frank Bolle. Mike Adair has been an illustrator since 1997. In one series of the comic, each story featured Pee-Wee wearing a different type of Scout hat from the classic "Smokey the Bear" hat to a glengarry to a beret to a baseball-type hat [such as seen above]. On seldom occasions, Pee Wee would be shown wearing something that was not an authorized Scouting headgear, but germane to the story. For instance, that one strip where Pee Wee challenged the camp's champion to a canoe race, the title panel showed Pee Wee wearing a nautical captain's hat.

Stories include Pee Wee attempting scout skills in a humorous way. Boys' Life provides its youthful readers this description of Pee Wee: "From high adventure to cooking, nobody explores Scouting like Pee Wee Harris. Join him and his friends each month in the pages of Boys’ Life magazine". Boyslife.org has an archive for all Pee Wee comics back to March 2010. In March 2011, on Boys' Life's 100th anniversary, his character appeared in an interview that talked about Boys' Life's comic section history called "How I Became a Comic Page Hero." An online version of this interview included a video and Pee Wee was voiced by Zachary Gordon.
