= Tenax I =

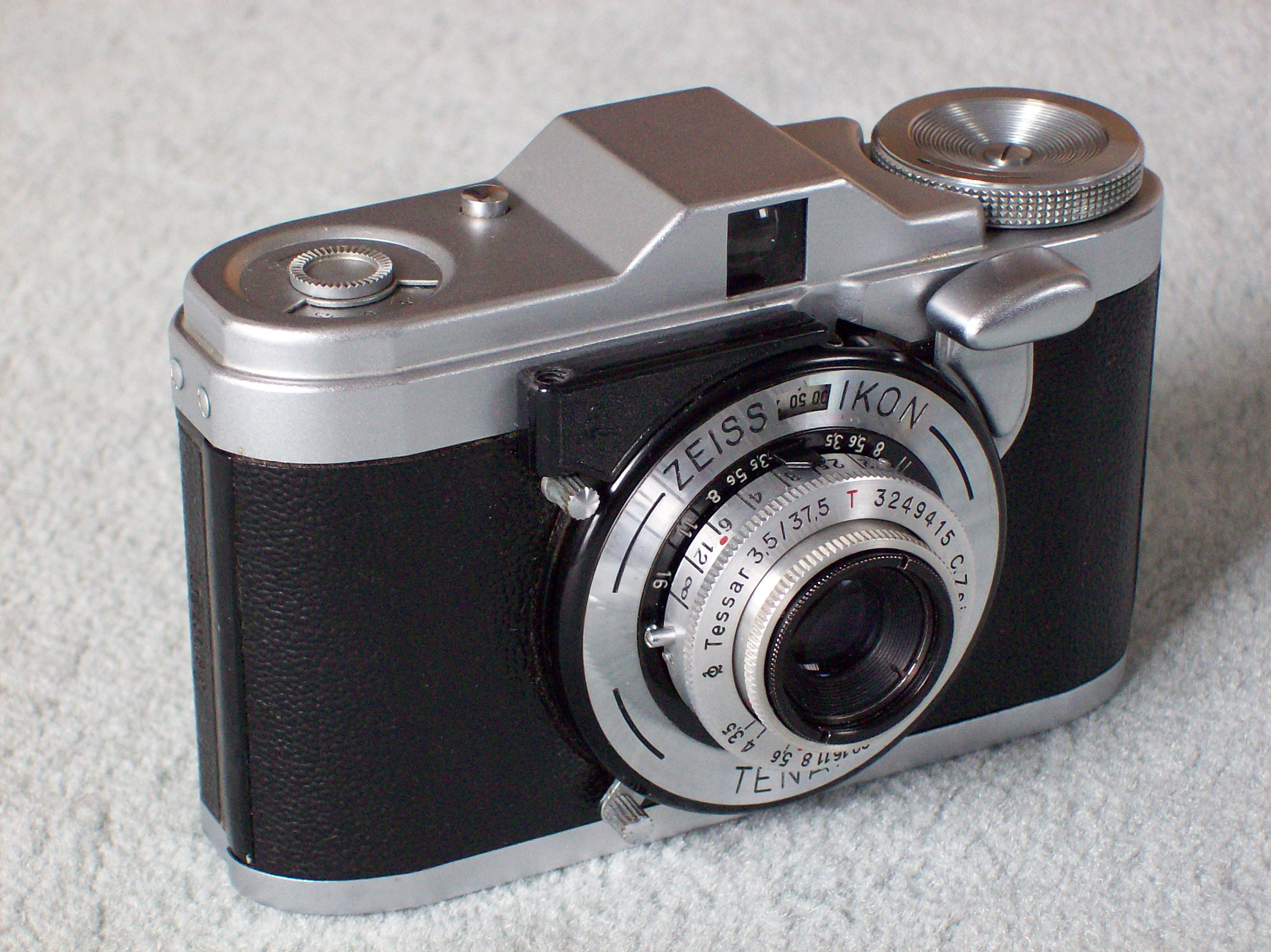

Overview
- Type: 35 mm camera

Lens
- Lens mount: Zeiss Tessar 37.5mm f/3.5 lens

Focusing
- Focus: manual

Shutter
- Frame rate: fast manual lever wind

The Tenax I is a 24x24 mm fixed lens camera by Zeiss Ikon launched in 1939.

The Tenax I was actually launched after the Tenax II. Like the Tenax II, it is a 24×24mm square-format camera taking over 50 exposures on a standard 135 film (35 mm), with a rapid-advance lever next to the lens. But it is a much simpler camera, with a completely different body, no rangefinder, a simple folding viewfinder on the top plate, and a Compur leaf shutter to 1/300". Most of them are equipped with a Zeiss Novar 3.5 cm f/3.5 lens. A smaller number have a Carl Zeiss Jena 3.5 cm f/2.8 Tessar.

Production began in 1938, and it was nearly halted in 1941. There was limited production during the rest of the war.

After the war, the East German Zeiss Ikon company continued the model. At the beginning the shutter was a Compur to 1/300" or a Compur-Rapid to 1/500", then it became the East German Tempor to 1/300". The lens could be the same Zeiss Novar 35mm f/3.5, or a Carl Zeiss Jena 37.5mm f/3.5 Tessar. The body code number was 111/23 with the Novar and 111/24 with the Tessar.

The Tenax was modified in 1953 with a fixed viewfinder integrated in a higher top plate with the exposure counter inside it, and a revised advance lever. Soon after it was renamed Taxona, because the East German company had lost the rights to use the traditional Zeiss Ikon names, property of the Western Zeiss Ikon company. At the same time, the Novar name became Novonar. The tip of the advance lever became black in 1954. Production ended in 1959.

The Tenax name had been used earlier by Goerz for their Taro-Tenax 9x12cm folding plate camera.
