= Scouting (magazine) =

American scout magazine

- Cover of the May–June 2012 issue
- Editorial Director: Michael Goldman
- Senior Editor: Aaron Derr
- Associate Editor: Michael Freeman
- Categories: Scouting
- Frequency: Five times a year: January–February, March–April, May–June, September–October, and November–December
- Total circulation: 955,637 (June 2012)
- First issue: April 15, 1913
- Final issue: May–June 2020 (print)
- Company: Boy Scouts of America
- Country: United States
- Based in: Irving, Texas
- Language: English
- Website: scoutingmagazine.org
- ISSN: 0036-9500

Scouting magazine is a publication of Scouting America. The target audience is adult leaders of Cub Scouts, Scouts BSA, and Venturering. It carries news on Scouting events, articles on aspects of Scouting such as service, outdoor skills and activities, and features about Scouting activities. It began publication on April 15, 1913, with five-times-a-year mail subscriptions included in the registration fee for all volunteer leaders registered with the BSA. The last print edition was the May–June 2020 issue, although online content continues to be updated.

Recurring content includes: Feature articles, Trailhead, What I've Learned, Advancement FAQs, Cub Scout Corner, Nature of Boys, What Would You Do?, Merit Badge Clinic, Ethics, Great Gear, Health & Wellness, Survive This!, Fuel Up, Dutch Treat, Boys' Life Preview, and Cool Camp.

== See also ==
- Scout Life
