= Camp Meeker, California =

Unincorporated community in California, United States

- unincorporated community village
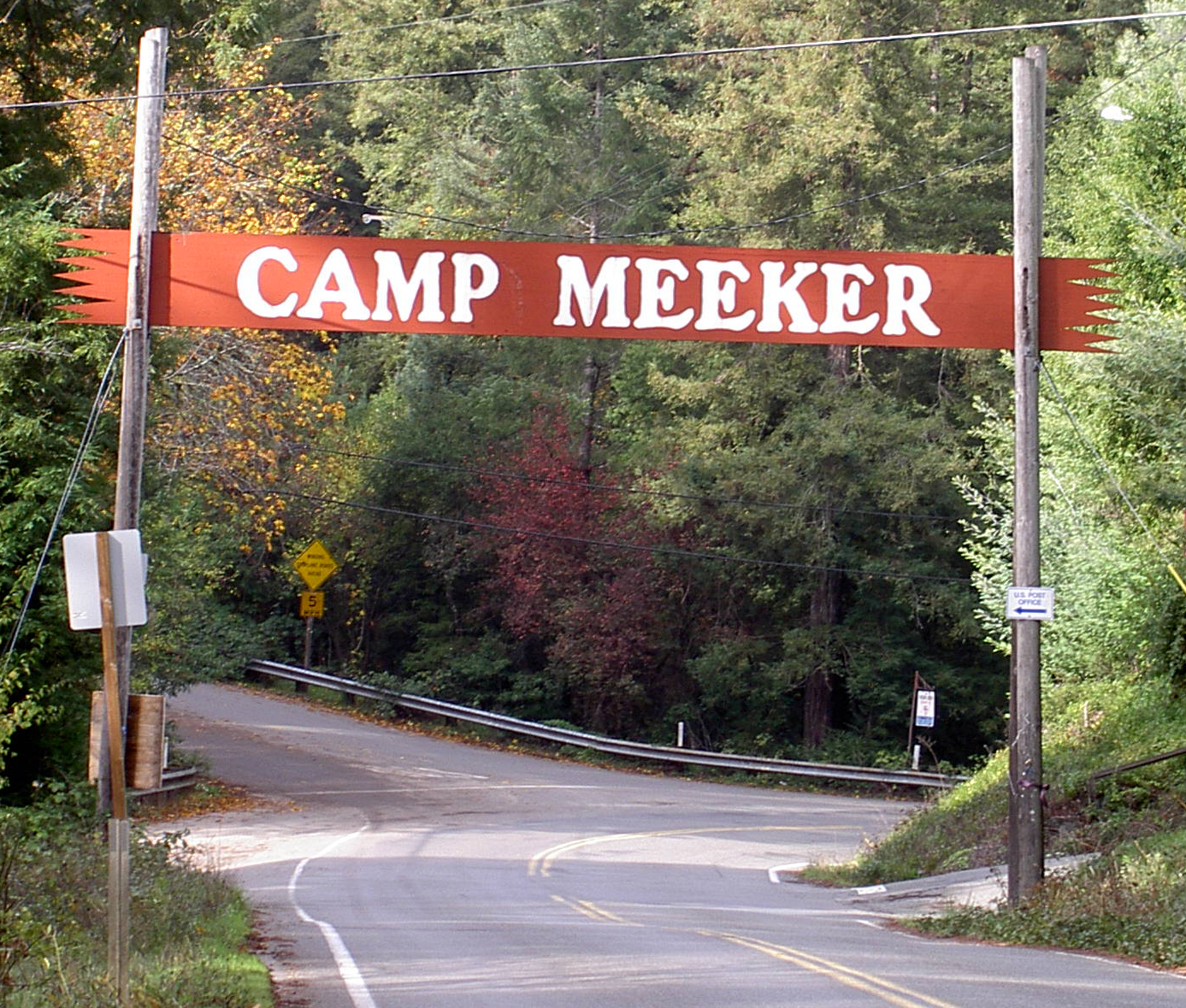
- Welcome arch on Bohemian Highway

- Location within the state of California Camp Meeker, California (the United States)
- Coordinates: 38°25′31″N 122°57′34″W
- Country: United States
- State: California
- County: Sonoma
- Elevation: 331 ft (101 m)
- Time zone: UTC-8 (PST)
  - Summer (DST): UTC-7 (PDT)
- ZIP code: 95419
- Area code: 707
- FIPS code: 06-10466
- GNIS feature ID: 1658200
- Website: http://www.campmeeker.org/

Camp Meeker is an unincorporated community in Sonoma County, California, United States, located on the Bohemian Highway, between Occidental and Monte Rio. It has approximately 350 homes on properties ranging from a couple thousand square feet to many acres, some flat and sunny, some on steep narrow gauge railroad type one-way streets. The population hovers at approximately 425.

Set amidst redwoods directly on Dutch Bill Creek, it gets an average of 55 inches of rainfall spread over about 69 average days during the winter season.

== History ==
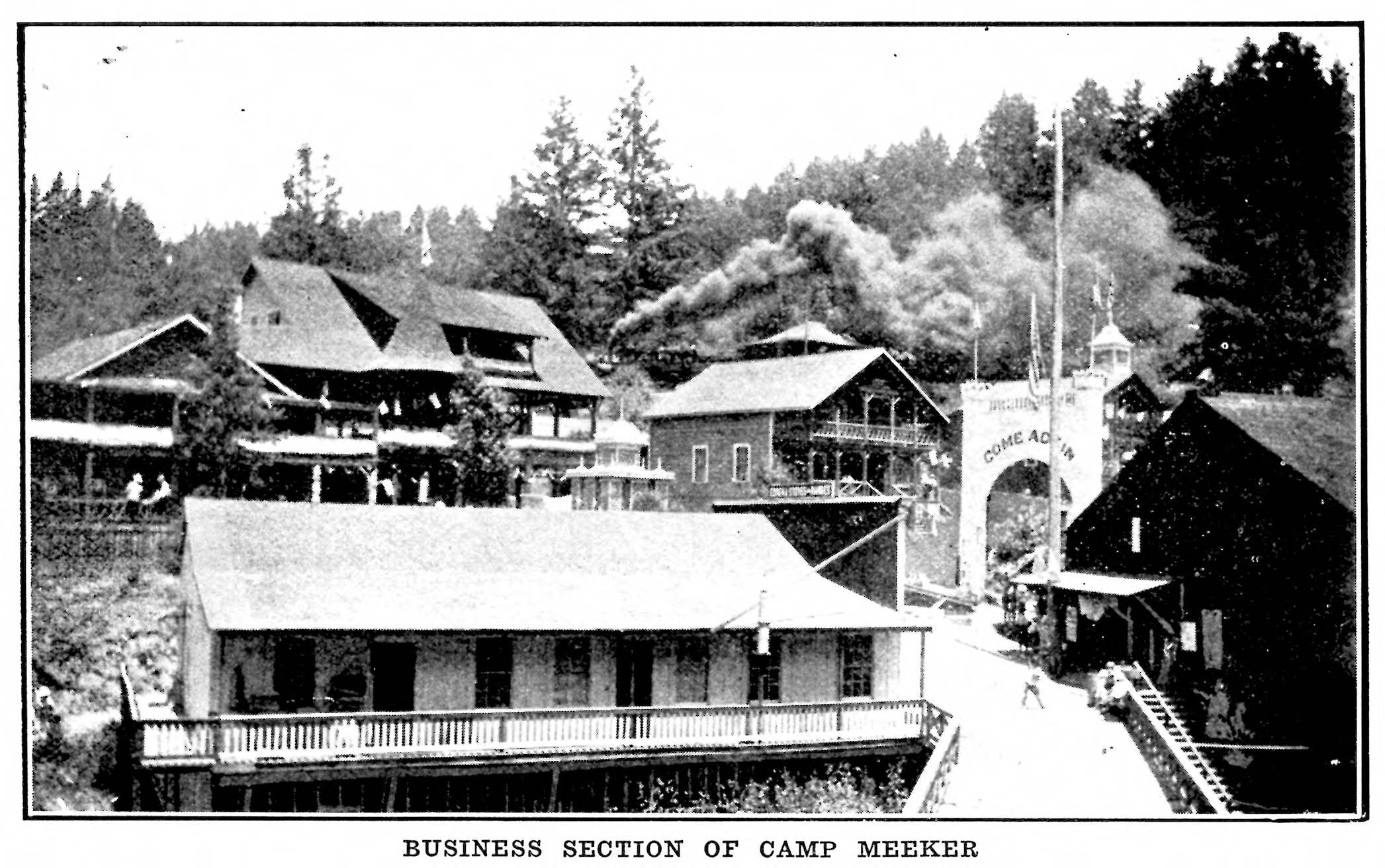
Camp Meeker, 1907

Camp Meeker takes its name from Melvin Cyrus Meeker, a lumber baron who established several mills in the area c. 1866.

Located on the North Pacific Coast Railroad (since abandoned), Camp Meeker was a center for logging the coast redwoods that built and then rebuilt San Francisco after the 1906 earthquake. After logging the trees, Meeker subdivided Camp Meeker into lots (each 25 ft by 12 ft (7.6m by 3.7m) with a one-room cabin) in 1898, they sold for $75. Around 1900, it was primarily a vacation place for people from San Francisco.

== Facilities ==
Camp Meeker is the home of St. Dorothy's Rest, a retreat center and summer camp.

Fire protection is provided by the Camp Meeker Volunteer Fire Department. In 2003, the department claimed that Camp Meeker was the only place in Sonoma County which places fire hydrants every 500 ft (150 m).

As of December 2001, one-year class wild coho salmon were spawning in Dutch Bill Creek. In 2002 Dutch Bill Creek was part of the captive broadstock program, and since 2006 juvenile coho have been released in the creek as a part of this program.

In November 2009, Camp Meeker revamped its recreational park on Dutch Bill Creek by removing a WPA-era dam and installing a bridge in its place. The entire area was rebuilt by PCI, Inc. under contract with the Gold Ridge Resource Conservation District after years of study.

Before becoming a village Camp Meeker was a lumber town followed by a summer enclave with the year rounders and the summer folk.
