= Robot (camera) =

German imaging company

Robot was a German imaging company known originally for clockwork cameras, later producing surveillance (Traffipax) and bank security cameras. Originally created in 1934 as a brand of Otto Berning, it became part of the Jenoptik group of optical companies in 1999, and specializes in traffic surveillance today.

The motorized amateur cameras powered by clockwork (spring) motors were first made in 1934, and ended with a special limited edition collector's model, "Star Classic", in 1996. The Robot film cameras used 35 mm film, mostly in square 24 × 24 mm image format, but many used 18 × 24 mm (half-frame) and 24 × 36 mm (standard Leica format), and non-standard formats such as 6 × 24 mm (Recorder 6), 12 × 24 mm (Recorder 12) and 16 × 16 mm (Robot SC).

== Camera Models ==
=== Robot I ===
Around 1930 Heinz Kilfitt, a trained watchmaker, designed a new 35 mm film compact camera using a 24×24 mm frame format (instead of the Leica 24×36 mm or cine 18×24 mm formats). The 24×24mm square frame provided many advantages, including allowing over 50 exposures per standard roll of Leica film instead of 36. Kodak and Agfa rejected the design, and it was sold to Hans Berning, who set up the Otto Berning firm.

Otto Berning was granted its first Robot patent in 1934; a US patent was granted in 1936. The camera was originally intended to come in two versions: Robot I, without motor, and Robot II with a spring motor. Its release was delayed and already the first camera "Robot I" included its hallmark spring motor. The first production cameras had a stainless steel body, a spring drive that could shoot 4 frames per second, and a rotary shutter with speeds from 1 to 1/500th second. The camera used proprietary "Type K" cartridges, not the now-standard 35 mm cartridges introduced in the same year by Kodak's Dr. August Nagel Kamerawerk for the Retina. The camera does not have a rangefinder, as it was designed for use mostly with short focal length lenses (e.g. 40 mm) with great depth of field.

The Robot I was quite small, the body measuring 108 mm (4¼ inches) long, 63 mm (2½ inches) high, and 32 mm (1¼ inches) deep. A very sharp zone-focusing f/2.8, 3.25 cm Zeiss Tessar lens added 125mm (1/2 inch) to the camera depth. It was about the size of the much later Olympus Stylus although it weighed about 567 grams (20 ounces), approximately the weight of a modern SLR. The die-cast zinc and stamped stainless steel body was crammed with clockwork. A spring motor on the top plate provided the driving force for a rotary behind-the-lens shutter and a sprocket film drive. The film was loaded into cassettes in a darkroom or changing bag. The cassettes appear to be based on the Agfa Memo cassette design, the now-standard Kodak 35 mm cassette not yet being popular in Germany. In place of the velvet light trap on modern cassettes, the Robot cassette used spring pressure and felt pads to close the film passage. When the camera back was shut, the compression opened the passage and the film could travel freely from one cassette to another.

The rotary shutter and the film drive are like those used in cine cameras. When the shutter release is pressed, a light-blocking shield lifts and the shutter disc rotates a full turn exposing the film through its open sector; when the pressure is released the light-blocking shield returns to its position behind the lens, and the spring motor advances the film and recocks the shutter. This is almost instantaneous. With practice a photographer could take 4 or 5 pictures a second. Each winding of the spring motor was good for about 25 pictures, half a roll of film. Shutter speed was determined by spring tension and mechanical delay since the exposure sector was fixed. The Robot I had an exposure range of 1 to 1/500, and provision for time exposures.

The camera had other features not specifically related to action photography. The small optical viewfinder could be rotated 90 degrees to permit pictures to be taken in one direction while the photographer was facing in another. When the viewfinder was rotated, the scene was viewed through a deep purple filter similar to those used by cinematographers to judge the black and white contrast of an image. The camera had a built-in deep yellow filter which could be positioned behind the lens.

=== Robot II ===
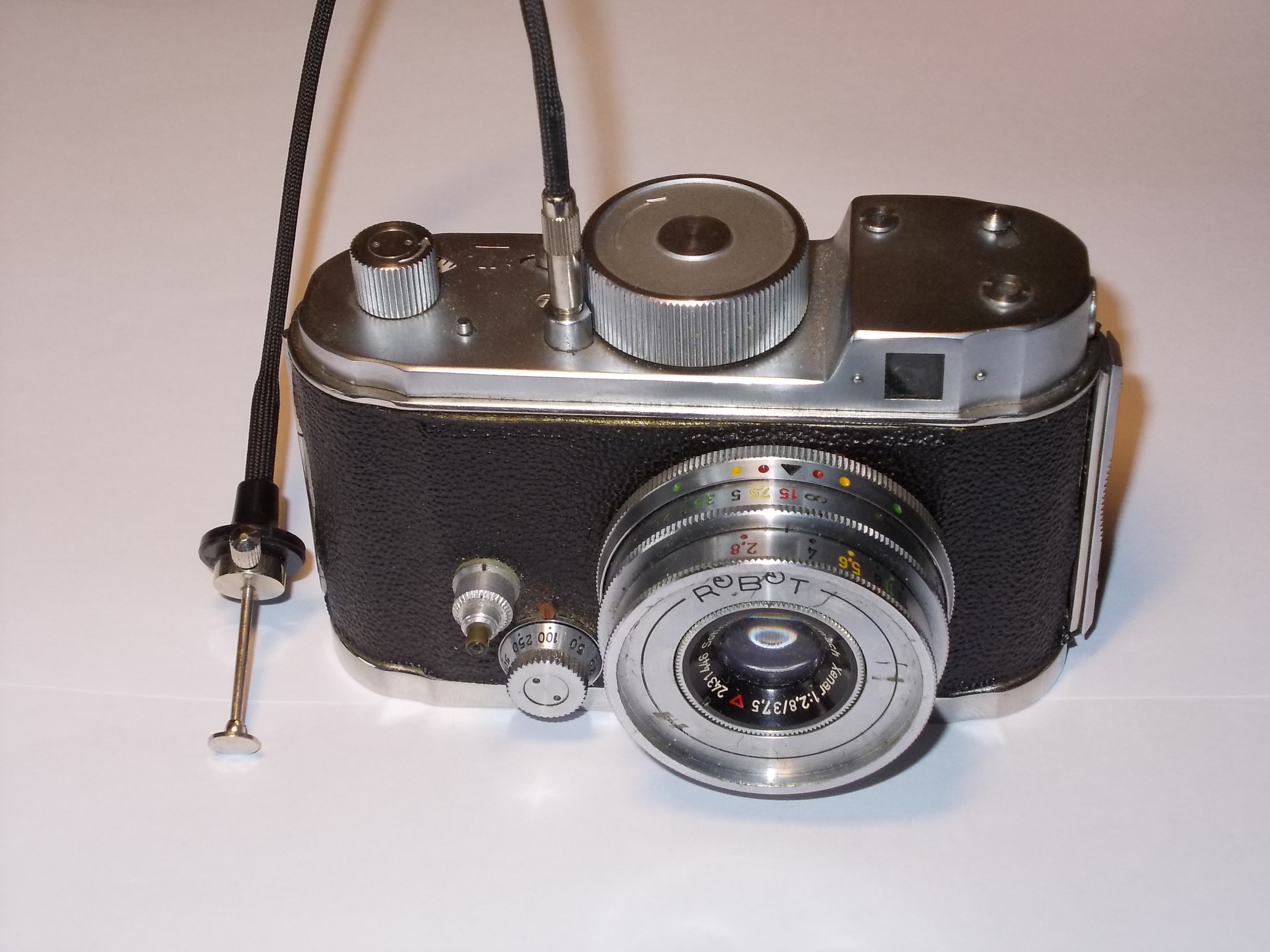
Robot II with Xenar 1:2,8/37,5 lens

In 1938 Berning introduced the Robot II, a slightly larger camera with some significant improvements but still using the basic mechanism. Among the standard lenses were a 3 cm Zeiss Tessar and a 3.75 cm Zeiss Tessar in f/2.8 and 3.5 variations, a f/2.0, 40 mm Zeiss Biotar and f/4, 7.5 cm Zeiss Sonnar. The film cassette system was redesigned, and the 1951 IIa accepted a standard 35 mm cassette. The special Robot cassettes type-N continued to be used for take-up. A small Bakelite box was sold to allow colour film to be rewound into the original cassettes as required by film processing companies. The camera was synchronized for flash. The swinging viewfinder was retained, but now operated by a lever rather than moving the entire housing. Both the deep purple and yellow filters were eliminated in the redesign. Some versions were available with a double-wind motor which could expose 50 frames on one winding. Civilian versions of the Robot were discontinued at the outset of the Second World War, but it was used as a bomb damage assessment camera by the Luftwaffe, mounted in the tail of Ju 87 (Stuka) dive bombers. This was an electrically driven camera using large cassettes possibly as many as 300 24 x 24mm images. Unlike the central Leica 250GG camera in the Ju 87, which was switched on automatically when the dive brakes were applied, the Robot camera had to be switched on manually. In the stress of the automatic pull out, when it was not uncommon for the pilot to black out from the g levels, switching on the bomb damage assessment camera was frequently forgotten.

=== Robot Star and Junior ===
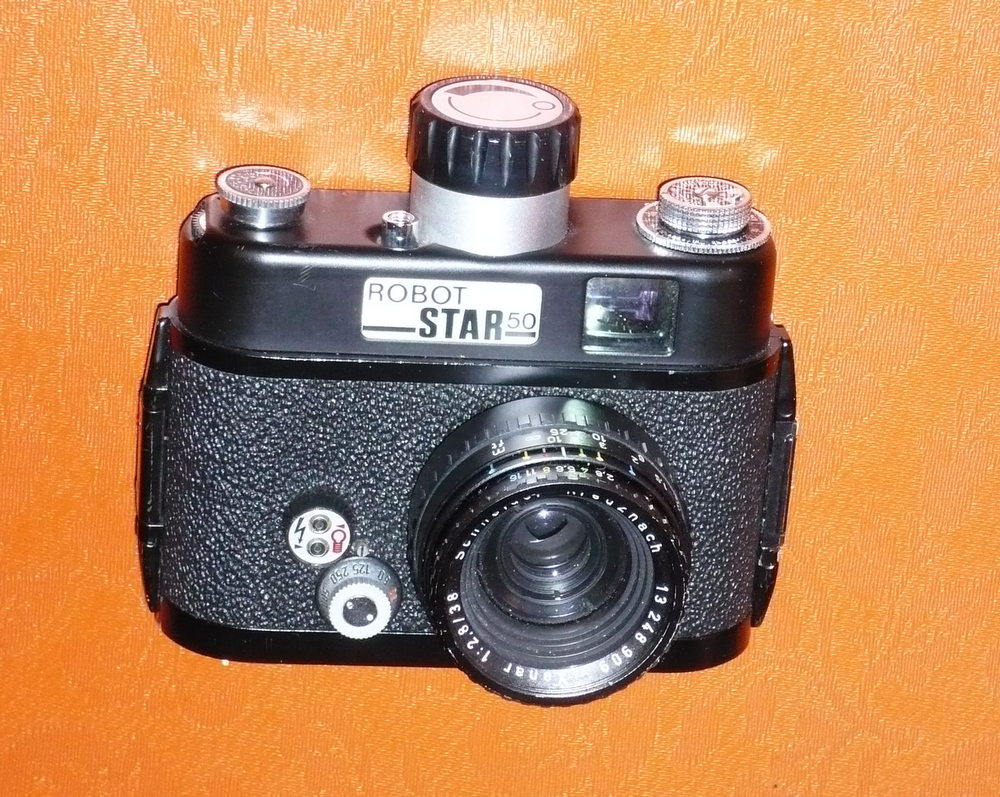
Robot Star 50

In the 1950s Robot introduced the Robot Star. Film could now be rewound into the feed cassette in the camera as in other 35 mm cameras.

Robot then introduced the "Junior", an economy model with the quality and almost all the features of the "Star" but without the angle finder or the rewind mechanism.

In the late 1950s the company, now called Robot-Berning, redesigned the Robot Star and created the Vollautomat Star II. The length stayed the same but the height increased by 12,5mm (half an inch). The new higher top housing disposed of the right angle finder and instead included an Albada finder with frames for the factory-fitted 38/40 mm and 75 mm lenses. The drive and shutter too were improved. By 1960 the hallmark stamped steel body was replaced by heavier die castings. The camera became, with slight changes, the Robot Star 25 and Star 50. The Robot Star 25 could expose 25 frames on a single winding, and the double-motor Robot Star 50 could expose 50 frames. Since most Robot cameras by then were sold for industrial use where the camera was fixed in position, Robot also introduced versions without a finder, and even without rewind. Although most production dates from the 1950-1960s era, essentially the same camera continued to be manufactured into the late 1990s.

=== Robot Royal ===
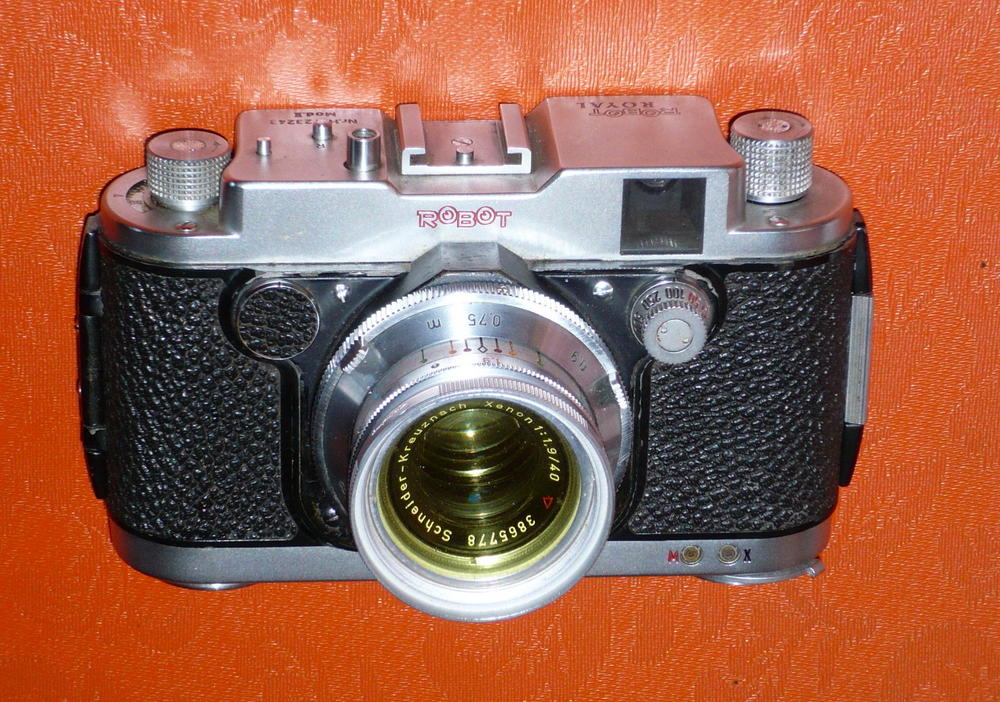
Robot Royal II viewfinder camera

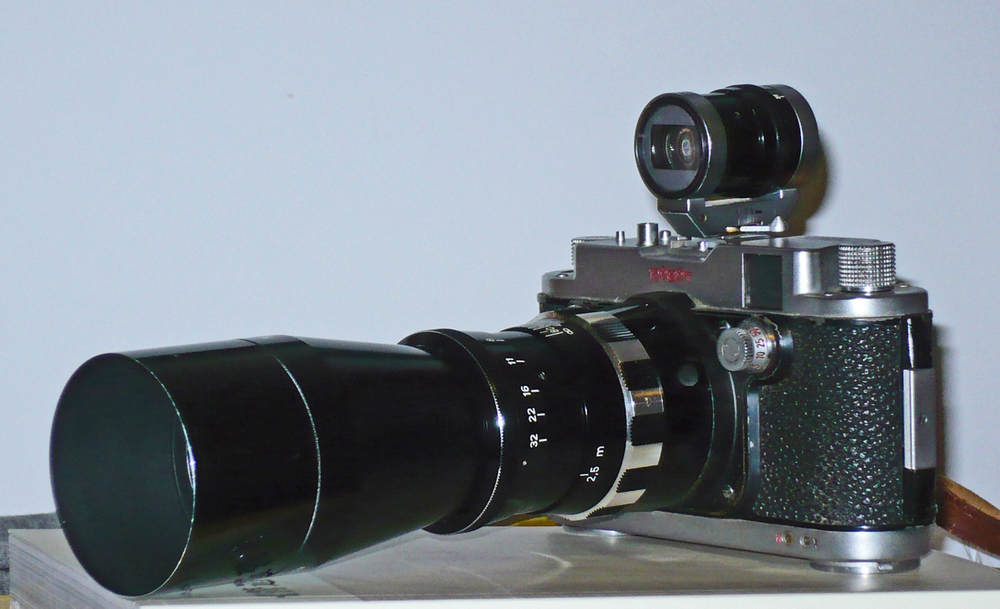
ROBOT ROYAL II W Schneider Kreuznach Tele-Xenar 1:5.5 200mm lens and a TEWE 35-200mm zoom viewfinder

Robot-Berning also produced enlarged versions of the Robot, the Robot Royal 18, 24 and 36, with built-in rangefinder and with an autoburst mode of operation capable of shooting 6 frames per second. The camera was about the size of a Leica M3 and weighed 907g (almost 2 pounds). It was equipped with a Schneider Xenar 45 mm f/2.8 lens. The Robot Royal 36 took a standard 35 mm still picture but was identical to the Royal 24 in all other regards. They retained the behind-the-lens rotary shutter with speeds from 1/2 to 1/500 s.

Robot Royal II is a larger viewfinder camera, it has no rangefinder, it does not have burst mode, it is a stripped down Robot Royal III.

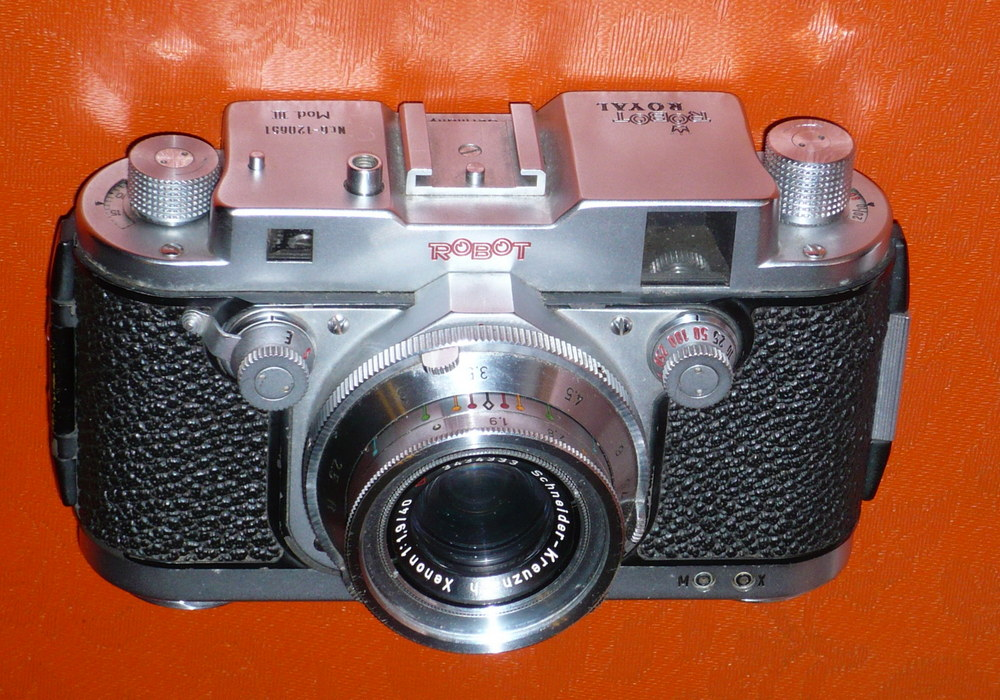
Robot Royal Model III rangefinder camera

Robot Royal III has a main spring, when tightened, the camera can take 4 to 5 pictures in succession. It has a built in rangefinder, eight interchangeable bayonet mount lenses.

There are two versions, Robot Royal 36, produce 36 24x36mm images on a roll of 135 film, Robot Royal 24 makes 50 24x24mm images on 135 film

A version for instrumentation (and traffic) was also created on the basis of the Royal design: the Recorder. These cameras were like the Royal but without viewfinder or rangefinder. They had interfaces to motors and detachable backs to support bulk film cassettes. A special parallel series of the Royal too was available that included these features. While the Royal had only limited market success, the Recorder was well accepted. It became the centerpiece of the company's portable document capture, traffic control and security solutions, and continues to be the standard Robot camera for instrumentation applications.

=== Military and government models ===
During the Second World War, specially adapted models were made for the German Luftwaffe.

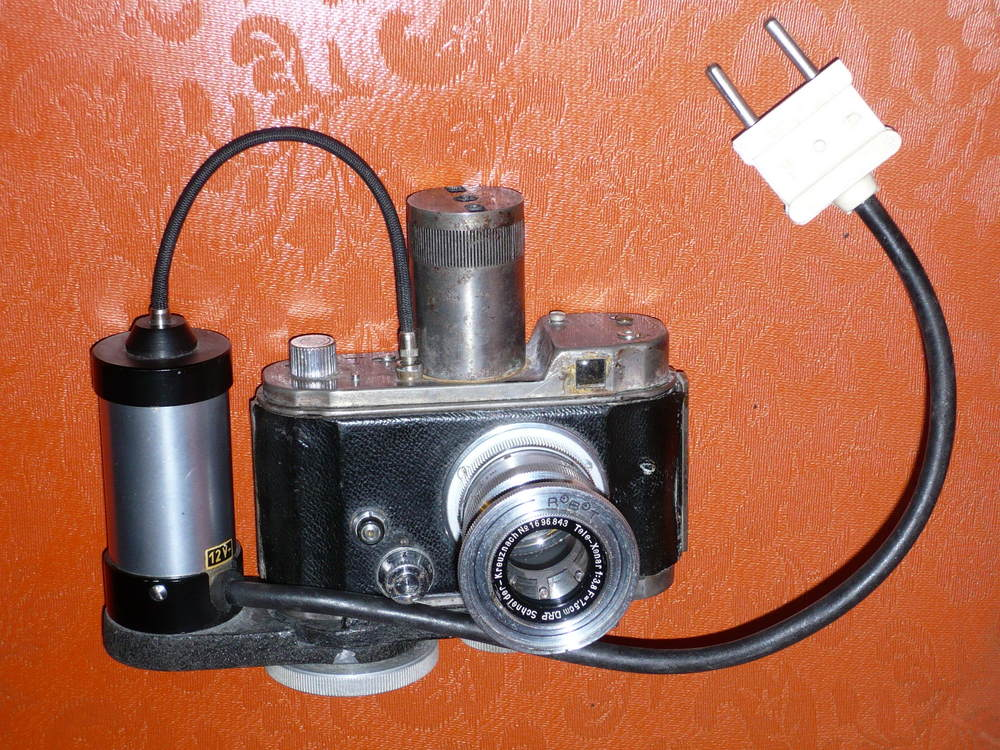
Robot Luftwaffen Eigentum with Robot 12V solenoid shutter actuator

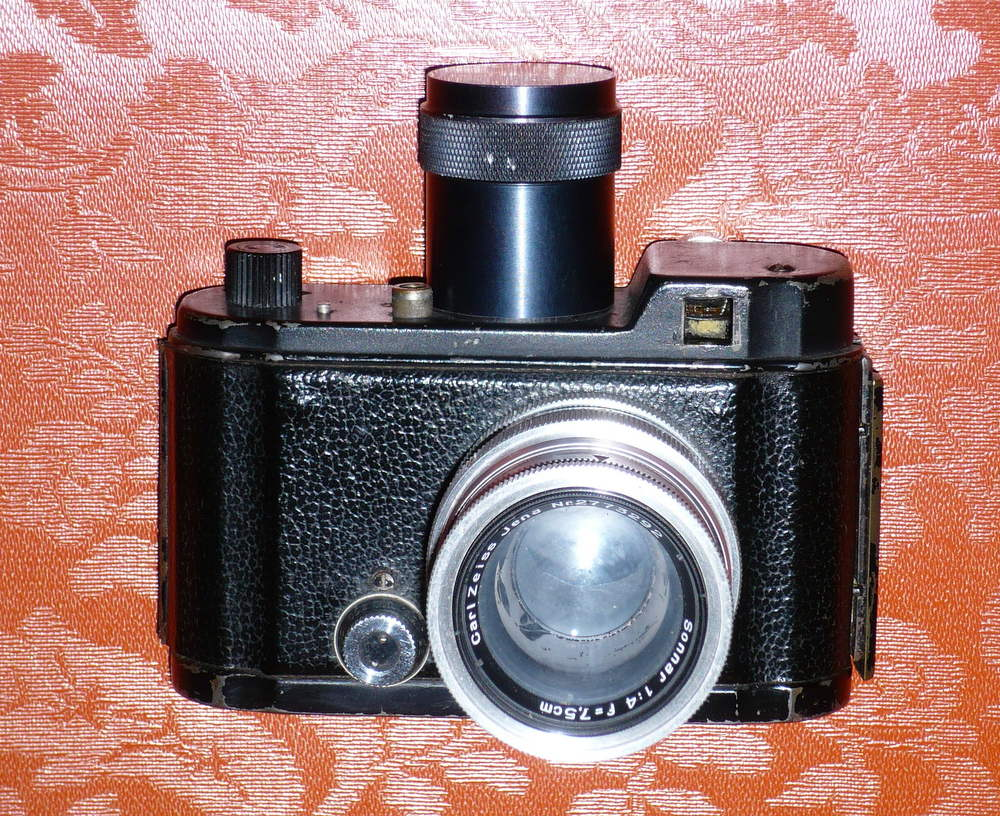
Robot Luftwaffen Eigentum

During the Cold War, Robots had a large following in the espionage business. The small camera could be concealed in a briefcase or a handbag, the lens poking though a decorative hole, and activated repeatedly by a cable release concealed in the handle. The company was well aware of this market and produced a variety of accessories which made the camera even more suitable for covert photography.

== Sequence photography ==
While the Robots were capable of sequence photography, the shutter that made this possible placed some constraints upon taking lenses and shutter speeds. To reach speeds as high as 1/500 second the inertia of the thin vulcanite shutter disc had to be kept at a minimum, requiring a small-diameter disc with a minimal sector opening. The screw in lens mount was 26 mm in diameter. The clear lens opening was only 20 mm. In contrast, Leica's mount was almost twice as large at 39 mm. Further, to permit lens interchangeability, the shutter was mounted behind the lens so the disc interrupted the expanding light cone. This placed some limits on lens design. While the 75mm Sonnar could be used with the aperture set to f/22, the Tele-Xenar suffered from some shutter disc vignetting unless opened more.

The maximum focal length lens for general photographic use that could be fitted with acceptable vignetting was 75 mm, although telephotos up to 600 mm were offered. A 150 mm Tele-Xenar was available for long-distance action photography, but it produced a vignetted circular image on the 24 × 24 mm frame. The lack of a rangefinder on the Robot and Robot Star required zone focusing of these long lenses: every shot had to be estimated or pre-measured. All of the mechanical movement made for a noisy camera, although not as noisy as some modern motor drives. For an extra fee, Robot-Berning supplied silenced versions with nylon gears.

Within their limits the Robots did an excellent job of sequence photography. The standard 38 mm f/2.8 Xenar lenses were extremely sharp, even by today's standards, and zone focusing worked well on rapid action with short focal length lenses. The reliable motor drive was as fast, if not faster, than later electrical drives, and there were no batteries to run down. Flash could be used at any speed. The square frame was big enough, with modern films, for A4 (210 x 297 mm, or 8.25"× 11.75") or greater enlargements, and 50 pictures could be taken on a standard 36-exposure roll. The cameras, especially the later ones built to industrial standards, will take much abuse and still keep functioning.
