= Miniature camera =

Type of camera

When still cameras using 35 mm film, originally used for cinematography, were introduced they were widely known as miniature cameras to distinguish them from the then commonplace rollfilm cameras. While the term could be used for a camera larger than a subminiature and smaller than a rollfilm camera, it was mostly used for cameras taking 135 film cassettes, or other 35 mm cassettes.

The smaller variants of rollfilm stayed popular for a while after introduction of 35mm film in still photography. Thus at least the smaller frame formats for 127 film were also seen as miniature formats, a fact reflected in camera names like Topcon's Minion (4×5cm format) and Utility Manufacturing Company's Falcon Miniature (3×4cm format).
