= Scout Life =

American magazine

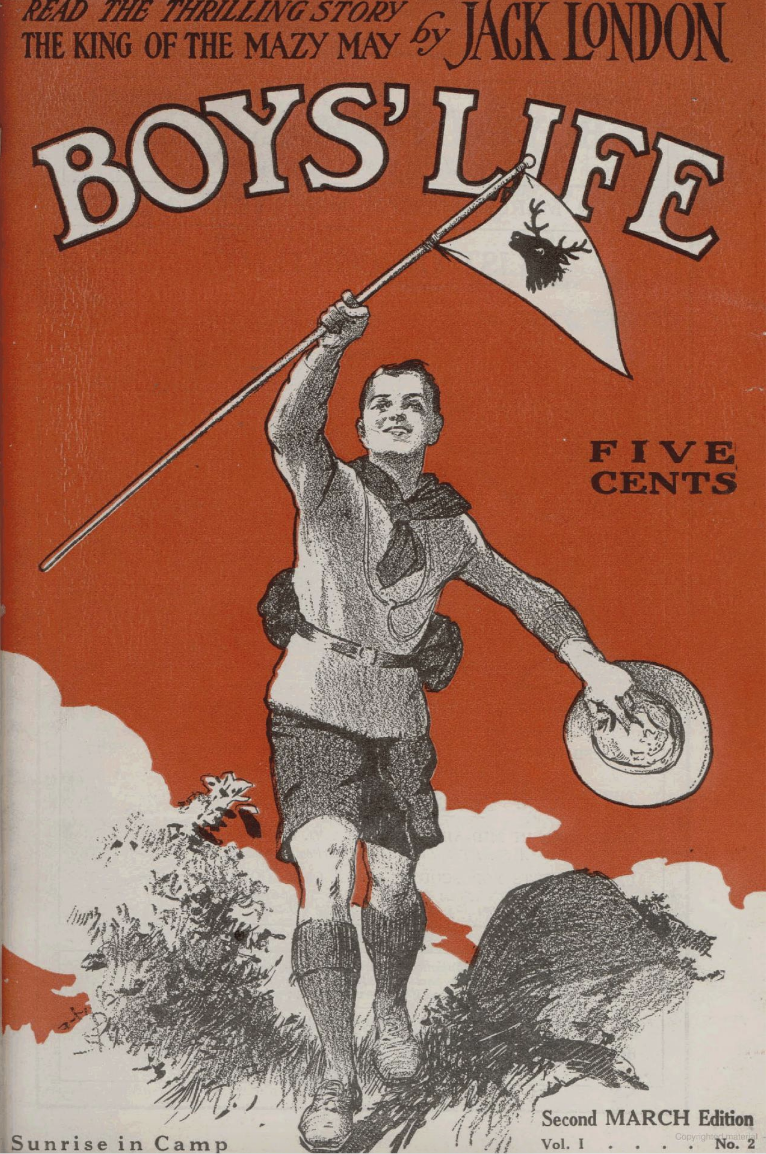
- The cover of Boys' Life, March 1911 issue
- Editorial Director: Michael Goldman
- Staff writers: Aaron Derr, Paula Murphey, Michael Freeman
- Categories: Boy Scouts of America
- Frequency: Monthly
- Publisher: Boy Scouts of America
- Total circulation: 1,097,968 (2013)
- First issue: March 1911 (regular edition)
- Country: United States
- Based in: Irving, Texas
- Language: English
- Website: www.scoutlife.org
- ISSN: 0006-8608

Scout Life (formerly Boys' Life) is the monthly magazine of Scouting America, formerly Boy Scouts of America (BSA). Its target readers are children between the ages of 6 and 18. The magazine‘s headquarters are in Irving, Texas.

Scout Life is published in two demographic editions. Both editions often had the same cover, but are tuned to the target audience through the inclusion of 16–20 pages of unique content per edition. The first edition is suitable for the youngest members of Cub Scouting, the 6-to-10-year-old Cub Scouts, and first-year Webelos Scouts. The second edition is appropriate for 11-to-18-year-old boys and girls, which includes second-year Webelos through 18-year-old Boy Scouts, Varsity Scouts and Venturers. If the subscription was obtained through registration in the Boy Scouts of America program, the publisher selects the appropriate edition based on the scout's age.

In June 2007, Boys' Life garnered four Distinguished Achievement Awards conferred by the Association of Educational Publishers (AEP), including Periodical of the Year.

The magazine's mascot is Scout the Maileagle, who answers readers' letters and is the subject of a comic strip. In 2018, the BSA announced a pending title change to reflect the addition of girls to Scouts BSA, the renamed program that now accepts scouts of both sexes. The title was changed to Scout Life beginning with the January 2021 issue.

== History ==
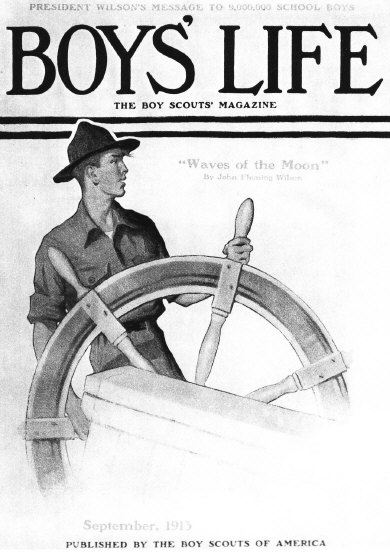
Norman Rockwell's first Boys' Life cover, 1913

In 1911, George S. Barton, of Somerville, Massachusetts, founded and published the first edition of Boys' Life magazine. It was edited by 18-year old Joe Lane of Providence, Rhode Island. He called it Boys' and Boy Scouts' Magazine. At that time there were three major competing Scouting organizations: the American Boy Scouts, New England Boy Scouts, and Boy Scouts of America (BSA).

Five thousand copies were printed of the first issue of Barton's Boys' Life, published on January 1, 1911. The more widely accepted first edition is the version published on March 1, 1911. With this issue, the magazine was expanded from eight to 48 pages, the page size was reduced, and a two-color cover was added. In 1912, the Boy Scouts of America purchased the magazine, and made it an official BSA magazine. BSA paid $6,000, $1 per subscriber, for the magazine.

== Content ==
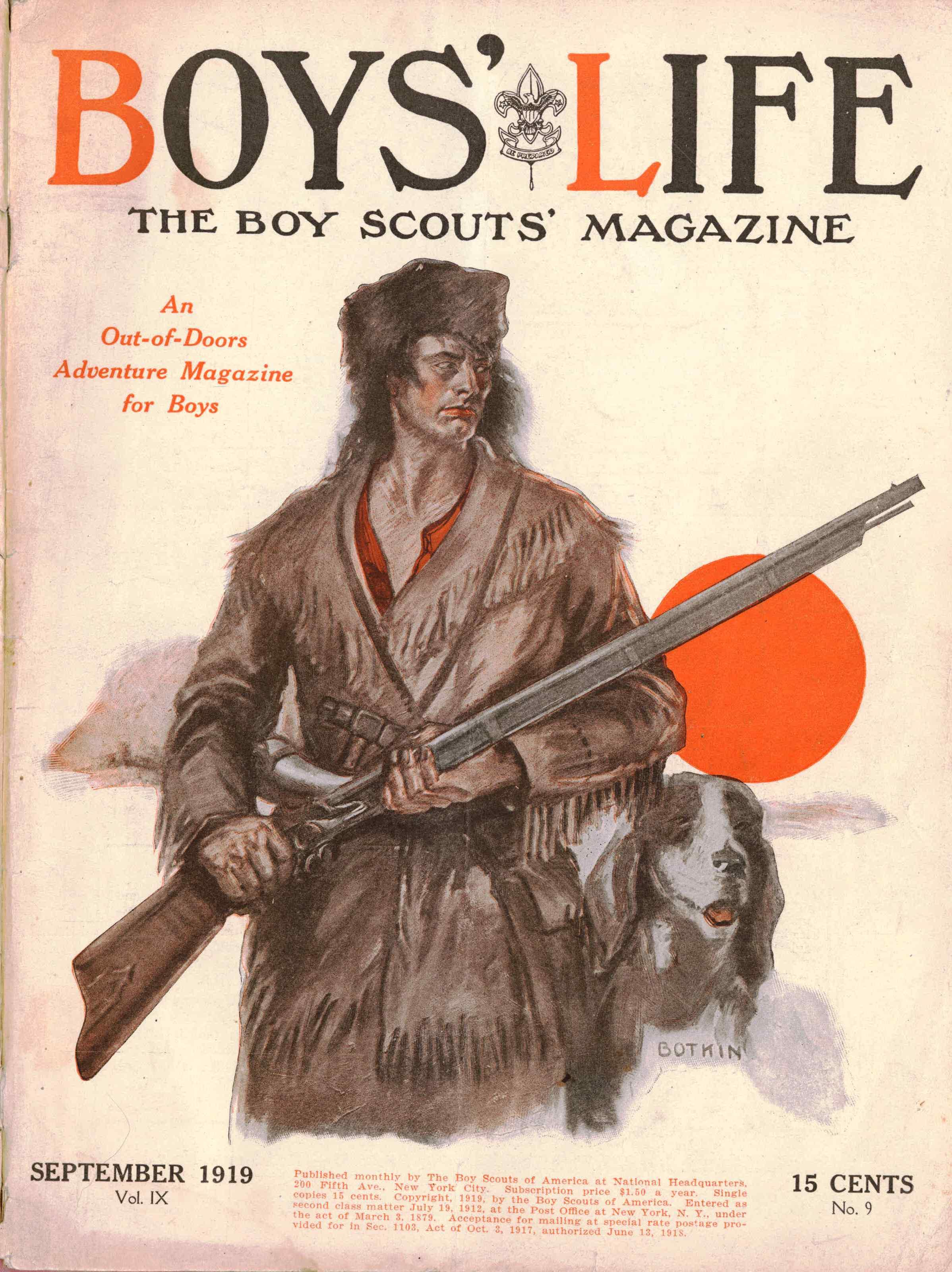
Boys' Life, September 1919

Often, the version of Boys' Life geared towards older boys features buying guides for products, such as cars, MP3 players, digital cameras, sunglasses, and more.

Boys' Life had in 2005 a monthly feature called "BL's Get Fit Guide". Each month highlighted a different aspect of physical health, such as diet, exercise, and drugs. Each month the magazine also features an unusual Boy Scout trip that most Scouts do not normally do. These trips range from a Philmont Scout Ranch adventure to a white water rafting trip.

In both versions, Boys' Life features a video game section, which, in addition to new video game reviews, contains cheats for a video game monthly. They also contain technology updates, as well as book reviews.

Content includes Special Features, Adventure Stories, Bank Street Classics, Entertainment, Environmental Issues, History, Sports, and Codemasters.

Comics have included Bible Stories, Pedro, Pee Wee Harris, Scouts in Action, Rupert the Invincible, Rocky Stoneaxe, Space Conquerors (1955 to 1975); The Tracy Twins (created by Dik Browne), Dink & Duff, Tiger Cubs, Webelos Woody, Norby, and John Christopher's The Tripods trilogy. Boys' Life contracted with the Johnstone and Cushing art agency to produce much of its early cartooning content.

Feature columns include Electronics, Entertainment, Fast Facts, History, Hitchin' Rack With Pedro the Mailburro, Think and Grin (jokes page), Science, Scouting Around, and Sports. Two columns, Hobby Hows and Collecting, featured Scouts' own personal hobby tips and collections; Scouts were invited to submit stories for these columns and received $10 if they were chosen for publication. There was also a Scouts in Action stories of scouts who helped saved persons lives.

=== Pedro ===
Pedro is a fictional burro created as a mascot for the magazine. Pedro first appeared in 1947 according to an account in the magazine for June 1961 in which he appeared on the cover. Pedro's official function is "mailburro," and for years, he appeared at the beginning of the letters to the editor column. A short paragraph detailing Pedro's latest "adventure" was decorated with a cartoon version of the beast by cartoonist Reamer Keller. In every issue since 1989, Boys' Life included a column "written" by Pedro that later evolved into a department known as "Hitchin' Rack". Scouts could write a letter addressed to Pedro, and mail it to Irving, Texas, where the Boy Scouts of America (BSA) and Boys' Life magazine were headquartered. Responses would be published in the following edition of the magazine. Through his column, Pedro has given advice on camping gear, camping skills, and how to solve problems within with camping, fishing, backpacking, cooking, etc. The second cartoon was called "The Pedro Patrol". In this comic, Pedro and a group of Boy Scouts taught the readers scouting skills. The comic was discontinued and replaced with "The Wacky Adventures of Pedro." This is a comics section in the magazine, drawn lately by Tom Eagan, then drawn by Tom Eaton, and starting in January 2016, Stephen Gilpin. He also regularly appears in videos and games on the magazine's website.

In 1970, Boys' Life Merchandise created a scarf using the Pedro logo. In the 1990s, Pedro started to appear on T-shirts, sweaters, hats, insignias, etc. Pedro became involved with the Merit Badge Series (the Boy Scouts' award system), showing techniques and tips on how to earn particular badges. This led to "Merit Badge Minute", a new column established in 2010, giving tips for three badges each month.

In the January–February 2022 issue, Pedro retired. The comic was subsequently titled "The Wacky Adventures of Steve" in the March 2022 issue and then renamed to "The Wacky Adventures @ Scout Life" in the April 2022 issue. In late 2022, Pedro was replaced by Scout the Maileagle, who also took over Hitchin' Rack.

== Contributors ==
Writers contributing over the years include Isaac Asimov, Bertrand R. Brinley, Catherine Drinker Bowen, Ray Bradbury, Van Wyck Brooks, Arthur C. Clarke, J. Allan Dunn, Bobby Fischer, Alex Haley, Robert A. Heinlein, William Hillcourt, John Knowles, Arthur B. Reeve, Ernest Thompson Seton, Zane Grey, Isaac Bashevis Singer, and Jeff Kinney.

Artists and photographers who have contributed over the years include Harrison Cady.

Donald Keith's "Time Machine" series of stories appeared between 1959 and 1989. Bobby Fischer wrote the chess column "Checkmate" from 1966 until 1969.

== See also ==
- Scouting
- The Open Road for Boys
- Chums
- Boys' Own
- Boy Scout Handbook
