= Scouting in popular culture =

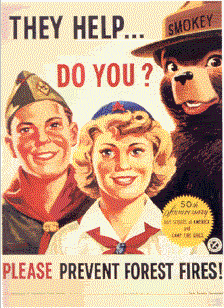
Smokey Bear with members of the Boy Scouts of America and the Camp Fire Girls celebrating the 50th anniversary of their founding in 1910

Since Scouting began in 1907, it has entered into many elements of popular culture, including movies, TV and books.

As a facet of culture throughout most of the 20th century, Scouting has been portrayed in numerous films and artwork. It is especially prevalent in the United States, where Scouting is tied closely to the ideal of American culture. The works of painters Norman Rockwell and Joseph Csatari and the 1966 film Follow Me, Boys! are prime examples of this idealized American ethos. One of the earliest depictions of Scouting in the entertainment media is a 1908 British silent film Scouts to the Rescue, shown in nickelodeons. Produced by Williamson Kinematograph, it depicted Boy Scouts tracking a gang of kidnappers through the woods to rescue an abducted baby.^{[b]}

Scouting is often dealt with in a humorous manner, as in the 1989 film Troop Beverly Hills, and is often fictionalized so that the audience knows the topic is Scouting without there being any mention of Scouting by name.

== Film ==
- Scouts to the Rescue (1909) UK;^{[b]} Boy Scouts track a gang of kidnappers through the woods and rescue an abducted baby
- Charley Smiler Joins the Boy Scouts (1911) UK;
- Remise du drapeau aux boy-scouts au Cinquantenaire (1914) Belgium;
- Boy Scouts to the Rescue (1917) US; original title Boy Scouts Be Prepared (1917) UK;
- The Little Boy Scout (1917) US; Justina disguises herself as a Boy Scout and joins the troop to escape her evil uncle.
- Drum Taps (1933) US; Ken and his brother Earl's Boy Scout troop go after a gang of rustlers. With Los Angeles Boy Scout Troop 107
- The Gang Show (1937) UK: A Boy Scout Troop stage a musical show to raise funds, when the lease expires on their meeting place.
- Tex Rides with the Boy Scouts (1937) US; Western featuring Members of Troop 13 Los Angeles District Boy Scouts of America
- Good Scouts (1938) US; Donald Duck becomes Scoutmaster of the Junior Woodchucks and goes camping.
- That Certain Age (1938) US; The daughter of a newspaper publisher helps a troop of Boy Scouts raise funds for Scout camp.
- Joy Scouts (1939) US; Boy Scouts go camping but the kids from Our Gang aren't old enough.
- Mr. Smith Goes to Washington (1939) US; Newly arrived in Washington, D.C., Montana Junior Senator and Boy Rangers leader Jefferson Smith proposes a National Boys Camp on Willett Creek upsetting the boss political machine back home.
- Scouts to the Rescue (1939) US; "Adventure! Thrill! Suspense! Action!..as Eagle Scout Jackie Cooper leads his hardy troop through breath-taking exploits!"
- Sea Scouts (1939) US; Donald Duck goes to sea with the Junior Woodchucks
- I Love You Again (1940) US; William Powell plays a leader in the Junior Rangers where Carl "Alfalfa" Switzer is trying to achieve his First Class Ranger.
- Yankee Doodle Dandy (1942) US; George M. Cohan, played by James Cagney, explains the meaning of the colors of the U.S. Flag to a dozen Boy Scouts during a musical number, You're a Grand Old Flag, written by Mr. Cohan.
- Henry Aldrich, Boy Scout (1944) US; The teenage Henry Aldrich, played by Jimmy Lydon, is the irrepressible Senior Patrol Leader of his Boy Scout troop as they compete in a Council camporee while coping with a troublemaking Tenderfoot who learns the meaning of Scout's honor the hard way. This picture had the official support of the BSA, which supplied a technical advisor to Paramount Pictures during filming.
- The Great Lover (1949) US; Bob Hope is a "Scoutmaster" to a group of "Boy Foresters". The "Boy Foresters" are more mean than helpful, courteous or kind, although they do ensure that lover-boy Hope walks the straight-and-narrow in the face of many temptations.
- Room for One More (1952) US; Cary Grant adopts a handicapped boy whose life is changed by family and Scouting, becoming an Eagle Scout. Also called "The Easy Way".
- Mister Scoutmaster (1953) US; TV star Clifton Webb worries that he is out of touch with the younger generation and becomes a Boy Scout leader.
- It Happens Every Thursday (1953) US; Comedy about a family publishing a small-town newspaper. One brief scene shows dad (John Forsythe) in a Scoutmaster uniform with a den of fully-uniformed Cub Scouts and a den chief.
- Scoutmaster Magoo (1958) US; Mr. Magoo – Animated short.
- It Happened to Jane (1959) US; Stars Doris Day as a Cub Scout den mother trying to save her local business during hard times.
- Follow Me, Boys! (1966) US; Lem Siddons (Fred MacMurray) decides to put down roots and ends up starting a Boy Scout troop during World War II.
- Boy, Did I Get a Wrong Number! (1966) US; stars Bob Hope, Phyllis Diller and Elke Sommer. Hope is a real estate agent who gets in trouble trying to hide an actress (Sommer) from the studio who wants her to film a bubble bath scene she refuses to do. Some Boy Scouts stumble upon their cabin hideout in the woods; hilarity ensues.
- Fitzwilly (1967) US; A troop of Cub Scouts innocently assist a store robbery on Christmas Eve; stars Dick Van Dyke and Barbara Feldon.
- Destroy All Planets (Gamera vs. Viras) (1968) Japan; At a World Scout Jamboree in Tokyo two young Scouts get mixed up in Gamera's battle with world-conquering aliens.
- Scout's Honor (1980) US, TV; Gary Coleman as a Cub Scout
- Scout toujours... (Always a Scout...) (1985) France; By and with popular comic French star Gérard Jugnot : iron-handed Eagle Scout Bien Bien Fou (French nickname meaning "Very Very Mad", derived from the infamous Battle of Dien Bien Phu) being ill, the kids are going to give his poor substitute some tough time...
- Au revoir les enfants (1987) France; by Louis Malle. In occupied France in 1944, Julien Quentin goes to a Catholic boarding school. When a new student Jean Bonnet arrives, Julien discovers that Jean is Jewish and the priests are hiding him. During a game with the school Scout Troop, the two friends get lost in a forest and are rescued by Germans. Eventually, Jean is arrested by the Gestapo.
- The Wrong Guys (1988) US; Five former Cub Scouts have a reunion and go camping on the mountain they never conquered. Stars Louie Anderson, Richard Lewis, Richard Belzer, Tim Thomerson, and John Goodman

Beginning his life of adventure: Young Indiana Jones (River Phoenix) finding the "Cross of Coronado" in Indiana Jones and the Last Crusade, as a Life Scout in the scene when he "discovers his life's mission", said film critic Roger Ebert

- Indiana Jones and the Last Crusade (1989) US; the beginning of the fictional Indiana Jones' career as an adventurer is depicted as a teenage Boy Scout in 1912. The Life Scout is trying to save the fictional Cross of Coronado crucifix from the villainous graverobbers while on a horseback riding trip in Utah.
- Troop Beverly Hills (1989) US; Shelley Long leads a troop of Wilderness Girls.
- Edge of Honor (1991) US; Stars Corey Feldman about "Northwest Wilderness Explorers" who stumble upon some stolen weapons hidden in a shack in the woods of the Olympic peninsula in Washington. The movie follows the boys as they try to escape from the bad guys, and how they finally deal with them, with a little help from an unexpected source.
- This Boy's Life (1993) US; Jack (Leonardo DiCaprio) is forced into the Boy Scouts by his stepfather (Robert De Niro).
- Father and Scout (1994) US; Stars Bob Saget in a made-for-TV movie about a wimpy dad and his son on a camping trip as part of a Scout-like group.
- Bushwhacked (1995) US; Stars Daniel Stern as a deliveryman framed for murder; he hides out by pretending to be a Scoutmaster to a group of "Ranger Scouts".
- Arlington Road (1999) US; Thriller starring Tim Robbins. Anti-government terrorists are also leaders of a Scouting organization which indoctrinates children and facilitates the carrying out of terrorist attacks.
- Christmas with the Kranks (2004) US; Stars Tim Allen and Jamie Lee Curtis. Cub Scouts selling Christmas trees are very unsympathetic characters in a movie with characters we mostly don't care for.
- Without a Paddle (2004) US; Stars Matthew Lillard, Seth Green and Dax Shepard; at the end of the film, the Dax Shepard character (Scoutmaster Tom) tells stories of his adventures around a campfire with his troop of Boy Scouts.
- 14 Hours (2005) US; Stars Rick Schroder; Boy Scouts assist in the evacuation of Memorial Hermann Hospital during Tropical Storm Allison.
- Down and Derby (2005) US; Cub Scouts and their dads compete in a pinewood derby.
- The Pacifier (2005) US; The younger daughter Lulu is a member of the Fireflies. She and her fellow Fireflies attempt to sell cookies in the Costco parking lot and get tormented by the boys from the Grizzlies troop. They are then trained by Shane Wolfe, the film's protagonist, and the next time they sell cookies, they fight and subdue the Grizzlies troop by tying them with their neckerchiefs and gagging them with cookies, leaving them defeated and humiliated.
- Outlaw Trail: The Treasure of Butch Cassidy (2006) US; Sixteen-year-old Life Scout Roy Parker (Ryan Kelley) and other members of Circleville, Utah, Boy Scout troop 14 seek the infamous western outlaw's treasure.
- Scout Camp (2009) US; The Fire Dragon patrol, with their ever-supportive Scoutmaster (Kirby Heyborne, Saints and Soldiers) is headed to Camp Rakhouta for what might be the best week of their lives. But when the legendary "Spirit Stick" of the prestigious camp goes missing, the entire tradition of the camp is threatened. Now the Fire Dragons, led by York Hayes (Shawn Carter, High School Musical 1, 2, 3) must do whatever it takes to find the stick, return, and restore the legacy of the camp.
- Up (2009) US; One of the main characters, Russell, is an eight-year-old Wilderness Explorer, which are clearly modeled after Scouts.
- Adventure Scouts (2010) US; is about a group of boys and girls who return from a camping trip to discover their small town is being held captive by a gang of motorcycle-riding knuckleheads.
- Den Brother (2010) US; Disney Channel Original Movie about a high school hockey player who must lead his little sister's "Bumble Bee" troop.
- Mockingbird Lane (2012) US; A made-for-TV movie based on the 1964–66 television series The Munsters. Eddie is a "Wildlife Explorer" scout. His Scoutmaster falls in love with Lily.
- Moonrise Kingdom (2012) US; On an island off the coast of New England in the 1960s, a young Khaki Scout runs away with his girl friend. The whole town, including his troop, sets out to track them down.
- Troop 491: The Adventures of the Muddy Lions (2013) US; A young inner-city Scout witnesses a murder and must make choices.
- Mystery of Ghost River (2014) Canada; Some Scouts go canoeing in Northern Ontario where they are haunted by the ghost of Ghost River.
- Scouts Guide to the Zombie Apocalypse (2015) US; A horror comedy film about three Scouts and a cocktail waitress as they combine forces to try and save their town from a zombie apocalypse.
- The Clovehitch Killer (2018) US; A murder mystery involving a Scoutmaster who, of course is an upstanding citizen of the local community and thus, not a suspect in the Clovehitch Murders.
- Stray Eagles (2019); historical film about the true story of an Italian group of boy scouts during the fascist dictatorship, and how they cooperated for the liberation of Italy from Nazi-fascism.
- The Fabelmans (2022) US; semi-autobiographical coming-of-age film loosely based on Steven Spielberg's childhood and adolescence, which features a couple of scenes where the main character, Sammy Fabelman (Gabriel LaBelle), makes two films for his troop, earning a merit badge for photography in recognition of his achievements for one of them.

== TV ==
- 3rd Rock from the Sun episode "I Brake for Dick" (1997) US; Harry attempts to follow the ways of the Boy Scouts.
- The Addams Family (1964–1966) US; episode "Morticia and the Psychiatrist" (1964) After Pugsley joins the Boy Scouts, begins playing baseball and gets a puppy, Gomez and Morticia seek the aid of a psychiatrist.
- All of Us episode "Crime and Maybe Some Punishment" (2006) US; Bobby goes to a Fireside Kids jamboree.
- American Dad! episode "Homeland Insecurity" (2005) US; Stan forces Steve to join the Scout Rangers to be prepared for the coming foreign invasion. However, the Scout clubhouse is a front for drinking and gambling by a bunch of partying delinquents.
- The Andy Griffith Show (1960–1968) US; Opie was shown as a Cub Scout in a few episodes and as a Boy Scout in at least one episode.
- Are You Tougher Than a Boy Scout? (2013) US; A reality series on The National Geographic Channel which pits a team of adult former Scouts against a team of Eagle Scouts in several outdoor competitions.
- Armchair Theatre UK: Season 15, Episode 4 Brussels Sprouts-Boy Scouts (2 October 1973). Controversial drama about teen-aged Scouts.
- The Big Bang Theory episode "The Adhesive Duck Deficiency" (2009) US; After they run out of food, Leonard, Howard, and Raj go insane and develop a plan to raid a Cub Scout Troop to obtain more food.
- Boardwalk Empire episode "Ging Gang Goolie" (2012) US; at a Boy Scouts of America breakfast in 1923 Washington, D.C., "Ging Gang Goolie" is sung.
- The Brady Bunch episode "The Liberation of Marcia Brady" (1971) US; Marcia joins Greg's Frontier Scouts to prove she is equal to the initiation tasks. Greg then tries to retaliate by joining Marcia's Sunflower Girls.
- Camp Lazlo (2005) US; An animated series about Bean Scouts at summer camp.
- Casper the Friendly Ghost episode "Boo Scout" (1951) US; Casper the Friendly Ghost, while all the other ghosts spend their time ghosting, is studying about how to become a Boy Scout. He finds a troop of Boy Scouts, but they all run away in fear. Finally, he meets Little Billy, who is too young to be a Scout but is okay with Casper being his friend. Billy sees that a large bear has the Scouts cornered, and Casper comes to their aid and scares the bear away. The grateful Scouts acclaim Casper as a hero.
- Craig of the Creek Jason, Boris, and Tony are Junior Forest Scouts.
- The Danny Thomas Show (1953–1964) US; Several episodes ("Pride Takes a Holiday" (1956), "Jack Benny Takes Danny's Job" (1958), "Danny, The Handyman" (1960), and "The Scoutmaster" (1961)) involve Cub Scouts or Boy Scouts.
- Dad's Army (1968–1977) UK; The character of Maurice Yeatman, the belligerent verger, is also the leader of the local Sea Scouts. The Scouts make brief appearances in several episodes, most notably The Big Parade (Episode 1 of Season 4, first shown 25 September 1970), and Come In, Your Time Is Up (Episode 4 of Season 8, first shown 26 September 1975).
- Diff'rent Strokes (1978–1986) US; Two episodes involved Cub Scouts: "Arnold Saves the Squirrel" and "Sam Adopts a Grandparent", both aired in 1985.
- Dragon Tales (1999–2005) US; episode "Back to the Storybook"/"Dragon Scouts" (4 September 2001) Emmy tries to figure out the best way to fit in when Cassie invites her to join the Dragon Scouts.
- DuckTales – Junior Woodchucks
- Ed, Edd n Eddy (1999) US; Several episodes (" Oath to an Ed", "To Sir with Ed", "An Ed in the Bush", "Ed Overboard", "Mission Ed-Possible", "No Speak Da Ed" and "The Good, The Bad and The Ed") feature the Urban Rangers consisting of Rolf, Jimmy, Jonny and Plank.
- The Fairly OddParents (2001–2013) US; Several episodes ("Scout's Honor", "Odd, Odd West", "Who's Your Daddy?", "Squirrely Puffs", and "Dinklescouts") feature a Scout-like group called the Squirrely Scouts, which first appeared over 21 years before the official introduction of Squirrel Scouts in the real world.
- Family Guy episode "The Son Also Draws" (1999) US; The episode follows the Griffin family's efforts to get Chris readmitted to the Scouts after he is expelled.
- The Flintstones (1960–1966) US; episode "The Good Scout" (1961) Assuming command of a Boy Scout troop, Fred quickly learns the hazards of a "routine" camping trip; episode "Cave Scout Jamboree" (1964) While camping, Fred and Barney stumble upon a Cave Scout jamboree, and Fred helps out as Scoutmaster.
- Friends episode "The One where Rachel Quits" After Ross accidentally breaks a young girl's leg, he offers to make it up to her by selling her Girl Scouts-like cookies. The girl has to sell at least 400 boxes to go to Space Camp, mocking both the prizes offered by troops for selling the cookies, and the rising prices of the boxes in recent times.
- Full House (1987–1995) US; Stephanie, DJ, and Michelle Tanner are all members of the Honey Bees in various episodes. The Honey Bees wear bee costumes, complete with stinger. A girl does the honey bee salute by moving her body in such a manner as to make the stinger move back-and-forth. They sell jars of honey rather than cookies.
- Fury (1955–1960) US; episode "The Boy Scout Story" (1956) Joey is excited about the prospect of his friend joining his Boy Scout troop; "Girl Scout" (1959) The boys get lost during an expedition into the mountains.
- Galactica 1980 episode "The Super Scouts (Parts 1 & 2)" (1980) US;
- General Hospital (1963–present) US; on 16 May 2017, Elizabeth Webber mentions that her oldest son Cameron Spencer is a Boy Scout
- George and Mildred UK; episode In Sickness and in Health (October 1979). Mildred goes to hospital; George is invited next-door for dinner and allows his friend Jerry to entertain a "niece" at his house in the meantime. Mildred is released from hospital and ejects Jerry and partner; fortunately, the neighbours' son Tristram (in Cub uniform) has put up a tent in the garden that they can use.
- Ghosts The character of Pat is a deceased scout leader who was shot by one of the scouts while teaching them archery.
- The Golden Girls (1985–1992) US; In several episodes, Rose Nylund is the Cadet Master of a group of sunshine Cadets. Some members of the Sunshine Cadets are portrayed as committing mild acts of hooliganism.
- Good Grief (1990–1991) US; episode "Cub Scouts And Horses And Whiskers on Kittens" (1990) Ernie plans a funeral for Buckaroo Bob whose dying wish was to be buried with his horse. He must also deal with some grown-up Cub Scouts whose den mother also died. All while directing a presentation of the Sound of Music.
- The Goodies UK; episode Scoutrageous (1977). When Graeme and Bill find out that Tim is secretly a Scout, they become masked "bad Scouts", which result in Scouting becoming an illegal organisation. Tim and the other Scouts are forced to hide from the "Scoutfinder General".
- Hallmark Hall of Fame (1951–2014) US; episode "Juliette Low and the Girl Scouts" (1952) The founding of the Girl Scouts, presented on the occasion of their 40th anniversary.
- Hazel (1961–1966) US; Episodes "Three Little Cubs" (1962) and "Hazel's Nest Egg" (1963) involve Cub Scouts
- Home Improvement (1991–1999) US; episode "Wild Kingdom" (1991): Tim thinks there is a mouse in the basement. The boys think it is a snake. Mark's friends, the Cub Scouts, want Tim to kill it.
- iCarly (2007–2012) US; In Season 2, Spencer tries to help a Sunshine Girl sell the most fudgeballs to win a bicycle so he can date her mother, who he also tells that his sister, Carly, was also a Sunshine Girl when she was little. Spencer ends up in direct competition with two other Sunshine Girls for the bike (who both look too old to be Sunshine Girls).
- It (1990) US; Young Stan uses the Scout Oath and Scout Law as mantras against fear.
- I've Got A Secret (1959) with Rocky Graziano. Garry and Rocky compete in a Tenderfoot Competition.
- Jackie Chan Adventures (2000–2005) US; episode "Scouts Honor" (2001) Jackie finds an ancient necklace that a relic hunter/thief is also after. When Jackie returns home, he notices Jade's lack of activity and makes her join the Buttercup Scouts. Jade returns the favor by making Jackie accompany the troop on a camping trip.
- The Jetsons episode "Good Little Scouts" (1962) US; George goes camping on the moon with Elroy and Space Cub Troop 54.
- Jim'll Fix It (1980) UK; This was a series where viewers wrote in and each episode several of the wishes would be realized. In one episode, a pack of Cub Scouts requested having their lunch somewhere unusual. The program sent them on the Revolution at Pleasure Beach Blackpool. The clip became one of the most requested on British TV shows. The situation was repeated in 2007 with the same participants for Jim'll Fix it Strikes Again.
- Kim Possible (2002–2007) US; In several episodes, Pixie Scouts are mentioned and shown. A Girl Scout-style organization whose motto is "Pixies Stick Together!". They're mentioned to sell both muffins and cookies, the former of which Ron Stoppable says he loves. Pixies are either guided by a den mother, or in Mr. Barkin's case, a "Brigadier Pixie." Kim Possible (Ron's best friend who later becomes his girlfriend), was a Pixie Scout herself when she was younger.
- King of the Hill US; In episode "The Order of the Straight Arrow" (1997) Hank and the guys take Bobby's troop camping, and induct them into the Order of the Straight Arrow, a parody of the Order of the Arrow. In "Straight as an Arrow" (2008), Bobby and his friends join the Order of the Straight Arrow; this time presented as a parody of a Boy Scout troop with no continuity to the 1997 episode. In episode "Flush with Power" (Season 4, Episode 22), Hank challenged the ethic of a local government official who said to him "You're a real Boy Scout" to which Hank replied "Made it to Eagle".
- Lassie (1954–1973) US; Several episodes ("The Cub Scout" (1958), "The Young Flyers" (1959), "The Explorers" (1960), "The Journey" part 3 (1963), "Honor Bright" (1965), and The Ledge" (1968)) involve Cub Scouts or Boy Scouts.
- Leave It to Beaver episode "Lonesome Beaver" (1958) US; 12-year-old Wally and Eddie Haskell join the Boy Scouts but Beaver at age "seven and three-quarters" learns he must wait until he is at least 11. When Wally's troop goes on a weekend campout, Beaver is forlorn.
- Lost episode "Hearts and Minds" (2005); John Locke (Terry O'Quinn) describes being a Webelos scout.
- Lost in Space episode "His Majesty Smith" (1966) US; Doctor Zachary Smith (Jonathan Harris) recites the Scout Law in an attempt to free himself from the Androids, creatures who crown the most worthless man as king of Andromeda, as a part of their Festival of Sacrifice each year.
- The Lucy Show (1962–1968) US; Several episodes ("Lucy Visits the White House" (1963), "Ethel Merman and the Boy Scout Show" (1964), "Lucy Teaches Ethel Merman to Sing" (1964), and "Lucy and the Scout Trip" (1964)) involve Boy Scouts or Cub Scouts.
- MacGyver Angus MacGyver frequently relates his Boy Scouting experiences with several episodes during the first three seasons of this popular action-adventure series.
- The Man Show US; The Man Show Boy dresses like a Girl Scout and attempts to sell cookies.
- The Mighty B! (2008) – the main character of this show is a badge-obsessed Honeybee Scout who wants to become a superhero, the other Scout troops are the Butterflies, the Black Widows, the Beavers, The Junebugs, and the Dragonflies.
- Mockingbird Lane (2012) US; in this remake of The Munsters, Eddie Munster is a Wilderness Explorer.
- Mork & Mindy (1978–1982): In an episode where Mork learns to say "No," a Girl Scout selling cookies bullies him into buying five boxes ("or else a sweet, little kid [namely me] doesn't get to go to camp.") She then drops the cookie boxes on the floor as she storms out of Mindy's apartment.
- My Three Sons (1960–1972) US; Several episodes ("Heat Wave" (1962), "Big Chief Bub" (1963), and "One of Our Moose is Missing" (1964)) involve the Cub Scouts
- The Nanny (1993–1998); Grace is mentioned to be a Red Robin Scout in two episodes: "Material Fran" and "Curse Of The Grandmas"
- NCIS: The character Timothy McGee is mentioned several times to have been a Boy Scout in his youth.
- The New Normal episode About a Boy Scout involved the Boy Scouts of America membership controversies.
- Nickelodeon's 14th Annual Kids Choice Awards (2001) US; Destiny's Child appeared wearing BSA uniforms
- Phineas and Ferb (2007) Isabella Garcia-Shapiro is a Fireside Girls troop leader.
- Project Blue Book (2019) US; In episode "The Scoutmaster", Scouts camping near Bowling Green, OH are buzzed by UFOs; their Scoutmaster goes to investigate. After taking several pictures and shooting an alien, he mysteriously goes missing for several days. The episode is loosely based on the 1952 case of Scoutmaster Sonny DesVergers in West Palm Beach, FL, which the real Project Blue Book determined to be a hoax.
- Real Kids, Real Adventures (1997–2001) US; episode "Scout's Honor: The Stephanie Shearman Story" (1999) Twelve-year-old Girl Scout Stephanie Shearman of Jonesboro, Arkansas was running in the Arkansas State University's five-kilometer "Fun Run" in Hot Springs when she saw a 52-year-old runner just ahead collapse. Since none of the adults on the scene knew how to perform CPR, Stephanie stepped in to save the man's life.
- Recess (2000) Phil is a Wild Screaming Woodchuck Scout who is always seen in uniform. In the episode "Beyond a Reasonable Scout" Mikey and Gus attempt to join as well.
- The Replacements (2006) US; Riley is in the Jerky Girls.
- Scarecrow and Mrs. King (1983–1987) US; In episode "The First Time" (1983), Cub Scout Den Mother Amanda reluctantly takes a package from IFF Agent Lee. A series of unfortunate events ensues as she tries to return the package. In episode "Utopia Now" (1985), Amanda's Scouting experience comes in handy as she and Lee track down a utopian community in the woods, founded by a tax reformer.
- The Simpsons episode "Boy-Scoutz 'n the Hood" (1993) US; Bart joins the Junior Campers, a Boy Scout-style organization that's not affiliated with the Boy Scouts of America, and has a series of misadventures (mainly thanks to his father, Homer).
- The Simpsons episode "A Star Is Burns" (1995) US; It's shown that Lisa's a member of the Girl Scouts, and Barney Gumble mistakes one of her Girl Scout meetings for an AA meeting.
- The Simpsons episode "The Bart of War" (2003) US; Bart joins the Pre-Teen Braves (Native American-themed) while his best friend, Milhouse, joins the Cavalry Kids (Civil War Union Soldier-themed).
- South Park
  - "Cripple Fight" (2001); The boys join the Mountain Scouts with Big Gay Al as Scoutmaster.
  - "Jewbilee" (1999); Kyle, Kenny and Ike go to a Jew Scout camp where Moses appears.
  - "Pinewood Derby" (2009); Stan's Cub Scout troop does their annual Pinewood Derby as an alien threat appears.
- Squirrel Boy (2006) US; Andy and Rodney are in the Badger Scouts.

== Documentaries ==
- 759: Boy Scouts of Harlem (2009) US; Documentary about Boy Scout Troop 759, which meets in Harlem.
- Emmer Bereet (2007) Luxembourg; The story of Scouting in general and a group of Scouts in 2006 in Luxembourg.
- Ian Hislop's Scouting for Boys (2007) UK; The story of the book Scouting for Boys
- Jamboree (1954) US; The story of the 1953 National Scout Jamboree in Irvine, California; starring James Stewart, William Demarest, Bob Hope and Jane Powell.
- The Nuclear Boy Scout (2003) UK; A non-fiction TV special about a Boy Scout who built an actual plutonium reactor as part of his Atomic Energy Merit Badge.
- Our World: Scouting (2007) UK; A 30-minute BBC documentary following the story of two participants in the 21st World Scout Jamboree. One Scout is from Mafikeng, South Africa and the other from the UK.
- Scouting for Adventure, ongoing Outdoor Channel documentary series, US; about the values and activities of the Boy Scouts of America, showing outdoor Scouting activities such as rock climbing, backpacking, canoeing, whitewater rafting, merit badges, and campfire cooking.
- Scout's Honor US; "In a town more familiar with agriculture than activism, an unexpected alliance could change the course of Scouting forever."
- Scouts! The Rise of the World Scout Movement (1984) Canada; Using archival footage from Bettmann Archive, British Movietone, EMI Pathe, William Hillcourt, and the Library of Congress, the film traces the rise of Scouting as a world movement in the 20th century and the life of Scouting founder Robert Baden-Powell. Includes interviews with two of the original participants in Baden-Powell's 1907 Brownsea Island Scout camp and his son and daughter, along with footage of the 15th World Scout Jamboree held in Canada in 1983.^{[b]}
- Troop 1500 (2005) US; A Girl Scout troop in Austin, Texas specializes in girls with incarcerated mothers
- When we were Scouts (2007) UK; Celebrities discuss what Scouting and Guiding did for them, including Ronnie Corbett, Bernard Cribbins, Cherie Booth, and Betty Boothroyd. Neil Morrissey visits a Scout camp.
- Ian Hislop's Scouting for Boys (2007) UK; an assessment of Robert Baden-Powell's Scouting for Boys; one of the most successful books of the 20th century.
- Empire (2012) UK: at the end of Episode 3, Playing the Game, presenter Jeremy Paxman identifies Scouting as a positive result of the British Empire; archive footage of Robert Baden-Powell is shown and Paxman visits a present-day jamboree.
- Scout's Oath, a film about LGBT issues in the BSA

== Comics ==
- Calvin and Hobbes character Calvin was in the Cub Scouts in some of the early strips.
- Garfield the Cat was licensed to promote Cub Scouting in the 1990s.
- Hamster Jovial et ses louveteaux, by Marcel Gotlib, is a parody of a French Scoutleader surrounded by three Wolf Cubs (two boys and a girl).
- Harvey Comics characters were licensed for use by the Boy Scouts of America in the 1960s and 1970s. Casper the Friendly Ghost was used to promote Cub Scouting, while Richie Rich promoted Boy Scouting.
- French comics artist Pierre Joubert made many comics and illustrations for Scouting magazines and calendars.
- Nero tries out being a Scout as an adult in The Adventures of Nero album Het Wonderwolkje (The Magic Cloud) (1960).
- La Patrouille des Castors was a long-running (1955–1993) Belgian comics series about a group of Scouts, drawn by Mitacq and written by Jean-Michel Charlier.
- Peanuts character Snoopy is the beagle in the long-running comic strip by Charles M. Schulz. He first appeared as a "Beagle Scout" in a 13 May 1974 strip and quickly becomes the leader of a troop composed of Woodstock and his other bird friends, a theme that reappears throughout the comic strip. They go on many camping trips and perform many Scout-like activities.
- In the Suske en Wiske story De Bokkenrijders Lambik is saved by a group of Scouts near the end.
- The Adventures of Totor was an early comic strip (1926–1929) by Hergé about a Scout leader.
- Disney comics feature the Junior Woodchucks, a Boy Scout-like association with Donald Duck's nephews Huey, Dewey, and Louie, created by Carl Barks. The Brazilian version denotes them as Junior Scouts. Another organization featured is the Littlest Chickadees, a Girl Scout-like association with Daisy Duck's nieces April, May, and June.
- Black Badge was a 2018 to 2019 comic book series by Matt Kindt and Tyler Jenkins, published by Boom! Studios. The series featured a young covert operations team called the Black Badges. The youth are picked from Boy Scouts by a secret government agency to earn the "Black" badge and conduct operations behind enemy lines.
- Scout's Honor was a 2021 series by David Pepose and Luca Casalanguida published by Aftershock Comics. It featured a "Ranger Scout" in post-apocalyptic Colorado. The society treats the Scout Handbook like a holy text.
- The 2024 graphic novel Gamerville by Johnnie Christmas featured a youth sent to a Scout-like summer camp, complete with red felt jackets and merit badges. Forced to turn of his devices and interact with other youth, the protagonist builds new skills and friendships.

== Music ==
- "Be Prepared" (1953) from Songs by Tom Lehrer; a satire of the Boy Scouts.
- "Welcome to the Machine" (1975) by Pink Floyd makes a direct reference to "Scouting for Boys."
- "Fergalicious" (2006) from The Dutchess by Fergie; in the music video Fergie and dancers dress provocatively in Girl Scout-like uniforms.
- "I was a Boy Scout" (1980) from Snakes and Ladders by Gerry Rafferty; the chorus line is "I was a Boy Scout in St. Mary's troop, I had my own patrol, I had a necktie and a monkey suit, 'Til I heard rock and roll."
- "I'm A Teenage Mutant Boy Scout" (2004) from the cabaret show Lounge-zilla! Asian Sings the Blues by Dennis Giacino; a Scout mutates after camping in a nuclear fallout zone.
- Elton John controversially performed with male strippers dressed as Cub Scouts at a gay rights concert at the Royal Albert Hall in London in 1999. He later apologized after The Scout Association in the UK objected. The UK Scout Association, which has a policy not to discriminate against homosexuals, said that the performers had done themselves and gay rights "no favours" by suggesting a link between homosexuality and pedophilia.
- "Kicked Out of the Webelos" (1984) from Webelos by The Queers
- In March 2013, Madonna made a public appearance dressed as a Scout and called for the BSA to lift the ban on gay membership.
- "Born to be a Scout" (2009) was featured in the movie "Scout Camp".
- "Girl Scout" in the musical Beetlejuice

== Fiction books and stories ==
- The Boy Scouts to the Rescue (1921)
- Berenstain, Stan and Jan. Berenstain Bears series.; Series of children's books includes several stories about the adventures of a group Bear Scouts
- Bruce, Dorita Fairlie. Nancy series. Series of children's books featuring the Girls' Guildry
- Payson, Howard. The Boy Scouts of the Eagle Patrol.
- Durston, Colonel George. The Boy Scouts in Front of Warsaw.
- Fitzhugh, Percy K., the 1915–1931 Tom Slade, Roy Blakely, Westy Martin, and Pee-Wee Harris series.
- Fletcher, Archibald Lee. Boy Scouts in the Coal Caverns.
- Fletcher, Archibald Lee (1913). Boy Scouts in Northern Wilds.
- Robert A. Heinlein wrote three stories and one novel involving Boy Scouts:
  - Heinlein, Robert A. (10 January 1948). "The Black Pits of Luna". The Saturday Evening Post.
  - Heinlein, Robert A. (May–July 1958). "Tenderfoot in Space". Boys' Life.
  - Heinlein, Robert A. (April–May 1949). "Nothing Ever Happens on the Moon". Boys' Life.
  - Heinlein, Robert A. (1950). Farmer in the Sky.
- Johnson, Cris (1966). The Rising of the Larks.
- The Mystery of the White Ties by Phyllis Irene Norris
- Stuart, Gordon. Boy Scouts of the Air on Lost Island.
- Sykes, Pamela (1987). The Brownies and the Flood. London, United Kingdom: Hodder & Stoughton.
- Victor, Ralph. The Boy Scouts Patrol.
- The Banner Boy Scouts and The Banner Boys Scouts Afloat by George Warren
- P G Wodehouse, The Swoop! (1909) A short comic novel in which 14 date-old Scout Clarence Chugwater saves England from invasion by foreign powers becomes the hero of the nation.
- The Emberverse series: The Morrowland Pack are the descendants of a Boy Scout troop that survived a plane crash after an apocalyptic event.
  - Stirling, S. M. (2008). The Scourge of God.
  - Stirling, S. M. (2013). The Given Sacrifice.

== Paintings ==
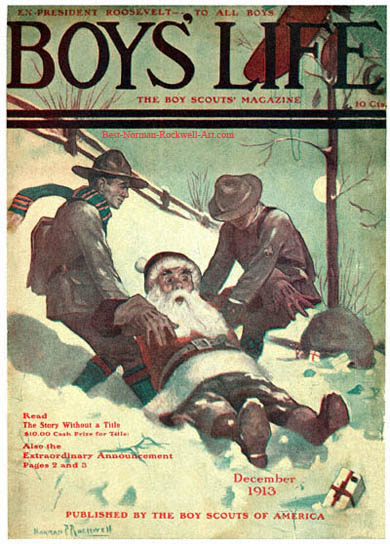
Santa and Scouts in Snow (1913), one of many Boys' Life covers

' by Norman Rockwell

- Scout at Ship's Wheel; (first published magazine cover illustration, Boys' Life, September 1913)
- Santa and Scouts in Snow; (1913)
- A Daily Good Turn (1918); ^{[a]}
- Straight Talks from the Scoutmaster (1918);^{[a]}
- A Good Turn (1924);^{[a]}
- Carry On (1932);^{[a]}
- Campfire Story (1934);^{[a]}
- A Scout is Friendly (1941);^{[a]}
- We, Too, Have a Job to Do (1942)
- All Together (1945);^{[a]}
- Friend in Need (1947);^{[a]}
- Our Heritage (1948);^{[a]}
- The Adventure Trail (1950);^{[a]}
- The Scoutmaster (1956);
- Ever Onward (1958);^{[a]}
- Pointing The Way (1960);^{[a]}
- Good Sign All over the World (1961);^{[a]}
- A Great Moment (1963);^{[a]}
- Growth of a Leader (1964)
- Breakthrough for Freedom (1965);^{[a]}
- Scouting is Outing (1966);^{[a]}
- Beyond the Easel (1966);^{[a]}
- Come and Get it (1968);^{[a]}
- Boy Scouts Pledging (1970);^{[a]}
- From Concord Tranquility (1971);^{[a]}
- We Thank Thee, O' Lord (1972);^{[a]}

== Stamps ==
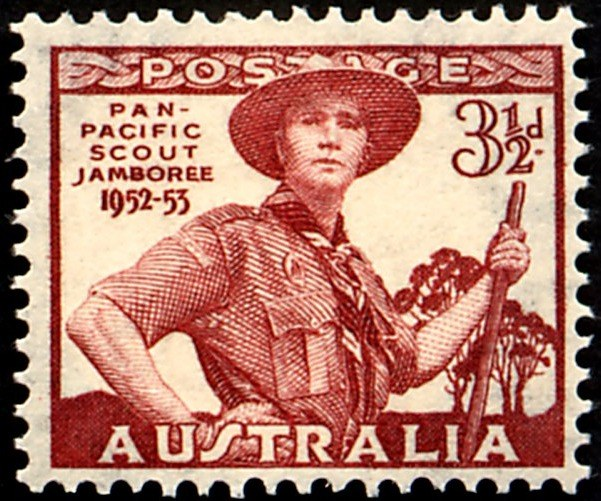
Australian Scouting stamp

Soon after the birth of Scouting, postage stamps began to be issued that celebrated Scouting. The number of Scouting themed stamps issued by various countries is enormous. Scouts on Stamps Society International (SOSSI) is an organization that specializes in the collection of Scouting stamps.

== Fictional Eagle Scouts ==
Dennis the Menace discussing Mr. Wilson being an Eagle Scout

TV series

- Jonathan Archer, Star Trek: Enterprise episode "Rogue Planet"
- Hank Hill, King of the Hill episode "Unfortunate Son"
- Professor Roy Hinkley, Gilligan's Island pilot episode "Two on a Raft", the radio announces "...the final member of the missing group was Professor Roy Hinkley, research scientist and well known Scoutmaster." He was the youngest Eagle Scout in Cleveland
- Malcolm Reed, Star Trek: Enterprise episode "Rogue Planet"
- Ray Palmer (Arrowverse), most prominently featured in Legends of Tomorrow.

Comics

- Mr. Wilson, Dennis the Menace
- J. Jonah Jameson, The Amazing Spider-Man

== Video games ==
- Moonlight Madness, a 1986 ZX Spectrum game released in Europe only. A Boy Scout must retrieve pills from a mansion's safe to save a mad scientist's life.
- WarioWare, Dr. Crygor is in The Mighty Bean Scouts. In the episode "The Big Surprise", Mona is a member of the Ultra Dog Scouts. In "The Diamond City 10", 9-Volt attempts to join The Mega Volt Scouts, but is not allowed to join because of his regular anger rushes.
- Peak, a 2025 game where players assume the role of Scouts who crash-landed in the wilderness and must climb a mountain to be rescued.

== See also ==
- Camp Fire Girls books
- George Harvey Ralphson
