= List of Boy Scout calendar illustrations =

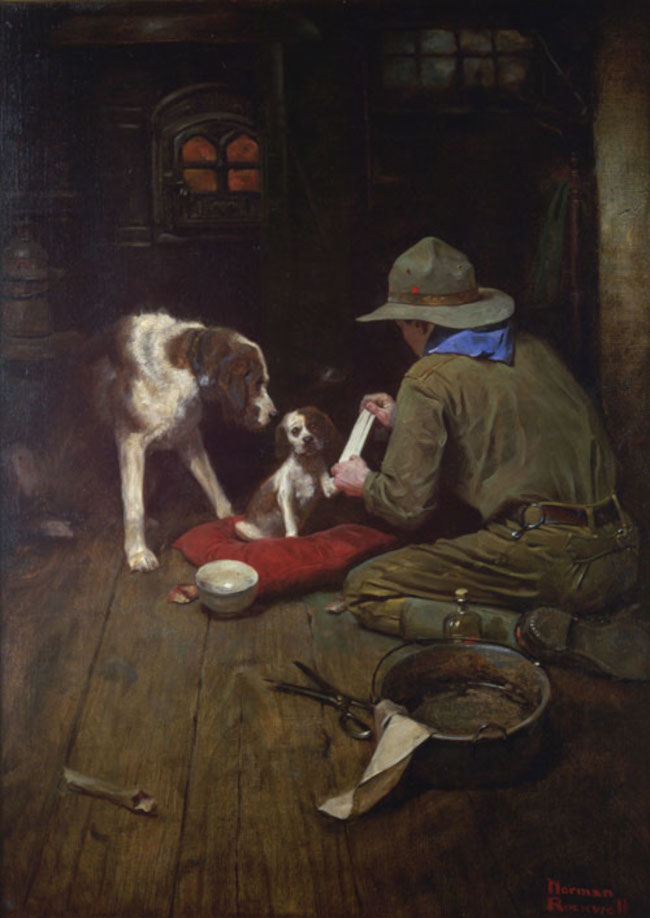
The first Boy Scout calendar painting, A Good Scout, 1918 by Norman Rockwell

Between 1925 and 1990, Brown & Bigelow released for sale a yearly calendar for the Boy Scouts of America (BSA) featuring a painting by illustrators Norman Rockwell (from 1925 to 1976) and Joseph Csatari (from 1977 to 1990). Rockwell missed only two years: 1928 and 1930; Csatari completed a painting for every year. The paintings were used to show Scouts of different kinds – Cub Scouts, Scouts BSA (Boy Scouts at the time), Venturing (Explorers at the time), Sea Scouts, and Air Scouts – engaging in mostly outdoor activities. Today a majority of the paintings, including Forward America and Beyond the Easel, are held in the collection of the National Scouting Museum. In 2020 as a part of the BSA's Chapter 11 bankruptcy filing, the organization listed the paintings as assets. The rest reside in private collections or the collections of museums such as The Children's Museum of Indianapolis.

The idea for the calendar series for the Boy Scouts of America was thought up by an unknown staff member at Brown & Bigelow in 1923. After seeing the positive effect on BSA recruitment by their use of Rockwell's paintings, the staff member wondered if Brown & Bigelow could help by publishing a calendar featuring one of his paintings. The BSA had used paintings donated to them by the American Red Cross, which had originally commissioned Rockwell paintings for The Red Cross Magazine. Later in 1923, James E. West, the Chief Scout Executive, agreed to Brown & Bigelow's proposal for a 1925 calendar with art first used for the Red Cross Magazine. They named the chosen painting, A Good Scout (it was originally titled A Red Cross Man in the Making). It shows a Scout bandaging a foot of a spaniel puppy under the eye of its mother. Assuming the calendar would sell well, the BSA, Brown & Bigelow, and Rockwell worked out a deal for future calendars. Rockwell would paint his works years in advance so that the chosen work could also be used as the cover of Boys' Life early in the year to advertise that year's BSA calendar. The calendars were large – 22 by 44.5 inches (56 by 113 centimeters) – and featured a single image for the year; users changed the months by tearing off a paper portion at the bottom.

Rockwell missed painting works for two early years of the calendar series – 1928 and 1930 – because he had too many other commissions. To prevent this from happening again and to control the content of the paintings, James E. West devised a yearly workflow. Early in the year, the BSA and Rockwell would both pitch ideas for a painting for a calendar two years in advance, and decide on the theme. While Rockwell was working in his studio, a member of the BSA's staff would visit to check the details of the painting. Every person depicted had to be the idealized version of a Scout or Scout leader, and every uniform had to be depicted correctly. The tents and other outdoors gear used by Scouts in the paintings had to be the right type and could not look like army surplus. After the initial draft of the painting was finished, West and other BSA staff members sometimes found details to be corrected.

Between 1925 and 1976, Rockwell created 49 paintings for the BSA's Brown & Bigelow calendar. Every work, except for A Good Scout in 1925 (which had already been published in a magazine), was painted specifically for the calendar. Several of the paintings were used by the BSA for a secondary purpose – to serve as the covers of its various handbooks. For example, three paintings – Spirit of America, The Scouting Trail, and Come and Get It – were reused as the cover illustration of the Boy Scout Handbook. The Adventure Trail was used as the cover art for the 1954 edition of the Den Chief's Handbook, and The Scoutmaster served as the cover of the 1960 edition of the Scoutmaster's Handbook.

After Rockwell retired in 1976, the BSA asked artist Joseph Csatari to take over the calendar series. From 1969 to 1972, Csatari was the art director in the advertising division of the BSA; he became the art director of Boys' Life in 1973. Between 1977 and 1990, Csatari created 14 paintings for the BSA's Brown & Bigelow calendar. Like Rockwell, he created all of the illustrations specifically for the calendar. None of Csatari's paintings were reused for handbook covers. Due to declining sales, Brown & Bigelow cancelled the calendars in 1990; The Scoutmaster was the final painting created for the series.

== Rockwell's illustrations ==
Illustrations created by Norman Rockwell for the Boy Scouts of America calendar between 1925 and 1976
Year	Name	Notes	Ref.
1925	A Good Scout	Originally printed in 1918 for The Red Cross Magazine under the name A Red Cross Man in the Making	
1926	A Good Turn		
1927	Good Friend		
1928	No painting was created for the 1928 calendar		
1929	Spirit of America	Used as the cover art for the 3rd edition of the Boy Scout Handbook; in the private collection of Steven Spielberg	
1930	No painting was created for the 1930 calendar		
1931	Scout Memories	In the collection of The Children's Museum of Indianapolis	
1932	A Scout is Loyal		
1933	An Army of Friendship		
1934	Carry On		
1935	A Good Scout		
1936	The Campfire Story		
1937	Scouts of Many Trails	In the collection of the National Scouting Museum	
1938	America Builds for Tomorrow		
1939	The Scouting Trail	Used as the cover art for the 4th edition of the Boy Scout Handbook	
1940	A Scout is Reverent		
1941	A Scout is Helpful		
1942	A Scout is Loyal		
1943	A Scout is Friendly		
1944	We, Too, Have a Job to Do		
1945	I Will Do My Best		
1946	A Guiding Hand		
1947	All Together		
1948	Men of Tomorrow		
1949	Friend in Need		
1950	Our Heritage		
1951	Forward America	In the collection of the National Scouting Museum	
1952	The Adventure Trail	Used as the cover art for the 1954 edition of the Den Chief's Handbook	
1953	On My Honor		
1954	A Scout is Reverent		
1955	The Right Way		
1956	The Scoutmaster	Used as the cover art for the 1960 edition of the Scoutmaster's Handbook	
1957	High Adventure		
1958	Mighty Proud	In the collection of the National Scouting Museum	
1959	Tomorrow's Leaders		
1960	Ever Onward		
1961	Homecoming	In the collection of the National Scouting Museum	
1962	Pointing the Way		
1963	A Good Sign All Over the World		
1964	To Keep Myself Physically Strong		
1965	A Great Moment		
1966	Growth of a Leader		
1967	Breakthrough for Freedom		
1968	Scouting is Outing		
1969	Beyond the Easel	In the collection of the National Scouting Museum	
1970	Come and Get It	Used as the cover art for the 9th edition of the Boy Scout Handbook	
1971	America's Manpower Begins with Boypower		
1972	Can't Wait		
1973	From Concord to Tranquility		
1974	We Thank Thee, O' Lord		
1975	So Much Concern	Stolen from the Elayne Gallery in 1978 and recovered in 2001	
1976	The Spirit of 1976	Stolen from the Elayne Gallery in 1978 and recovered in 2001	

== Csatari's illustrations ==
Illustrations created by Joseph Csatari for the Boy Scouts of America calendar between 1977 and 1990
Year	Name	Notes	Ref.
1977	The New Spirit		
1978	Scouting Through the Years		
1979	Eagle Service Project		
1980	The Reunion		
1981	After Hours		
1982	The Patrol Leader		
1983	Family Camping		
1984	The Strength of Scouting Though Volunteers		
1985	The Spirit Lives On		
1986	It's a Boy's Life		
1987	Values that Last a lifetime		
1988	Winter Camping Scene		
1989	You Can Do It		
1990	The Scoutmaster	Final calendar illustration	
