= Justin Szlasa =

American entrepreneur, film producer, and civic leader

- Citizenship: United States
- Occupations: Technology entrepreneur; film producer; civic leader
- Organization(s): Los Angeles Homeless Services Authority; Future Communities Institute
- Notable work: Side by Side

Justin Szlasa is an American technology entrepreneur, documentary film producer, and civic leader. He has served as a commissioner for the Los Angeles Homeless Services Authority (LAHSA) and as Director of Homeless Initiatives for the Future Communities Institute, where his work has focused on homelessness policy and nonprofit funding systems in Los Angeles.

== Early career and filmmaking ==
Before working in public policy, Szlasa worked in the technology sector and in documentary film production.

In 2009, he produced Boy Scouts of Harlem a documentary about a Boy Scout troop in Harlem, New York, examining the experiences of youth participants and community perceptions of scouting in the neighborhood.

Szlasa later partnered with actor Keanu Reeves to produce the 2012 documentary film Side by Side. The film examines the film industry's transition from photochemical film to digital cinematography and features interviews with filmmakers and cinematographers discussing technological changes in filmmaking.

== Civic leadership and homelessness initiatives ==
=== Future Communities Institute ===
Szlasa later became Director of Homeless Initiatives at the Future Communities Institute, where he worked on programs addressing operational challenges in homelessness services.

In 2024 he helped launch the LA Working Capital Fund, a financing program designed to provide bridge funding to nonprofit organizations delivering homelessness services while they wait for reimbursement from government contracts.

He also helped develop LAURA (Los Angeles Unhoused Response Academy), a fellowship and training program intended to expand and support the homelessness services workforce in Los Angeles County. The initiative received philanthropic support including funding from Keanu Reeves and the United Way of Greater Los Angeles.

=== LAHSA commission ===
Szlasa served as a commissioner for the Los Angeles Homeless Services Authority (LAHSA), a regional agency responsible for coordinating homelessness services across the City and County of Los Angeles.

During his tenure he raised concerns about financial oversight and operational performance in some homelessness programs. In July 2025, he voted against the appointment of a new senior homelessness official, citing concerns about operational experience.

In 2025, before voting on approximately $400 million in service contracts, Szlasa visited a “Safe Sleep” program in South Los Angeles operated by Urban Alchemy. Following the visit, he raised questions about program capacity and occupancy and filed a public records request seeking additional contract and payment information.

Szlasa has also advocated for expanded internal auditing and financial transparency within LAHSA during discussions about the agency's oversight and payment systems.
