= Girl Scout Museum and Archives =

Defunct museum in New York City

Coordinates: 40.750877°N 73.983368°W

The Girl Scout Museum and Archives was part of the Girl Scout National Historic Preservation Center at the Girl Scouts headquarters located at 420 Fifth Avenue in New York City. It was founded in 1987 to promote and preserve scouting history and its collection dates back to 1912 when the Girl Scouts were founded. The museum held more than 60,000 photos, 7,000 publications, 650 uniforms and an a/v collection dating back to 1918. The museum is now permanently closed.

== See also ==
- National Scouting Museum
