= We, Too, Have a Job to Do =

1942 painting by Norman Rockwell

- Artist: Norman Rockwell
- Year: 1942
- Medium: Oil on canvas
- Dimensions: 76 cm × 56 cm (30 in × 22 in)
- Location: National Scouting Museum

We, Too, Have a Job to Do is a painting by American illustrator Norman Rockwell that depicts a Boy Scout in full uniform standing in front of a waving American flag. It was originally created by Rockwell in 1942 for the 1944 Brown & Bigelow Boy Scout Calendar. The model, Bob Hamilton, won a contest to be in the painting and personally delivered a print to the Vice President of the United States at the time, Henry A. Wallace.

== Creation ==
The painting was created to encourage Scouts to participate in the war effort during World War II. The name of the painting, We, Too, Have a Job to Do, comes from a slogan that the Boy Scouts of America used in 1942 to rally scouts to support the troops by collecting metal and planting victory gardens.

The model, Bob Hamilton, won a contest with his local council in Albany, New York, to be depicted in the painting. He traveled to Rockwell's studio in Arlington, Vermont, to model for Rockwell. Since Hamilton was a scout, the uniform shown in the painting was his, unlike some of Rockwell's other models. Originally, he wore a turtle shell neckerchief slide with his uniform that he had made. Rockwell did not like it and asked Hamilton to swap it for a simpler Turk's head slide. In 1944, Hamilton personally delivered a copy of the painting to Vice President Henry A. Wallace. Hamilton later became an Eagle Scout, served in the Navy, and worked for the Boy Scouts. He died in July 2008, at the age of 82.

== Composition ==
The painting depicts a Boy Scout giving the Scout salute; behind him is an American flag, rippling in an unseen breeze. The Scout's face is solemn yet confident. His brown eyes, cleft chin, and idealized face stand out to the viewer. The Scout's uniform is perfect, with a campaign hat, showing that he is a First Class Scout. A Den Chief cord hangs over the Scout's right shoulder, and a backpack hangs over his left shoulder.

== Meaning ==
The painting represents the idea that there is always work to be done in a Scout's neighborhood and that it is a Scout's duty to do it.
