= Side by Side (2012 film) =

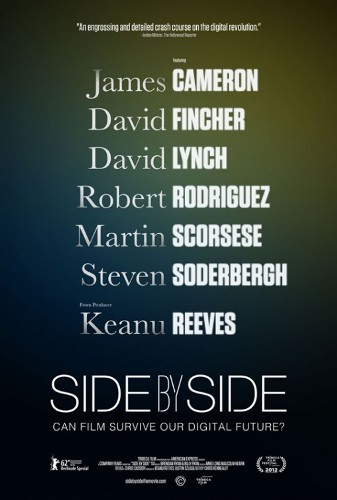
- Theatrical release poster
- Directed by: Christopher Kenneally
- Produced by: Keanu Reeves; Justin Szlasa
- Starring: James Cameron; David Fincher; David Lynch; Robert Rodriguez; Martin Scorsese; Steven Soderbergh; Keanu Reeves
- Narrated by: Keanu Reeves
- Cinematography: Chris Cassidy
- Edited by: Mike Long; Malcolm Hearn; Kamil Dobrowolski
- Music by: Brendan Ryan; Billy Ryan
- Production company: Company Films
- Distributed by: Tribeca Film Axiom Films (UK and Ireland)
- Release date: February 15, 2012
- Running time: 98 minutes
- Country: United States
- Language: English
- Box office: $67,054

Side by Side is a 2012 American documentary film directed by Christopher Kenneally. It was produced by Justin Szlasa and Keanu Reeves. It premiered at the 62nd Berlin International Film Festival and it was shown at the Tribeca Film Festival.

== Synopsis ==
The documentary investigates the history, process and workflow of both digital and photochemical film creation. It shows what artists and filmmakers have been able to accomplish with both film and digital and how their needs and innovations have helped push filmmaking in new directions. Interviews with directors, colorists, scientists, engineers and artists reveal their experiences and feelings about working with film and digital media.

== Cast ==
- Keanu Reeves, actor
- John Malkovich, actor
- Danny Boyle, director
- George Lucas, director, producer
- James Cameron, director
- David Fincher, director
- David Lynch, director
- Robert Rodriguez, director
- Martin Scorsese, director
- Steven Soderbergh, director
- The Wachowskis, directors
- Christopher Nolan, director
- Joel Schumacher, director
- Richard Linklater, director
- Lars von Trier, director
- Lena Dunham, director, actress
- Greta Gerwig, actress
- Caroline Kaplan, producer
- Lorenzo di Bonaventura, producer
- John Knoll, visual effects supervisor at Industrial Light & Magic
- Tim Webber
- Dennis Muren, special effects artist
- Bradford Young, cinematographer
- Craig Wood
- Derek Ambrosi, film editor
- Dion Beebe, A.C.S.
- Jost Vacano, A.C.S.

And many more. IMDb lists 69 cast members in total.

== Reception ==
On Rotten Tomatoes, the film has an approval rating of 92% based on reviews from 66 critis. The website's critics consensus reads: "Keanu Reeves proves a groovy guide through this informative exploration of how technology is transforming cinema, with an even-handed defense for both the old and the new." On Metacritic it has a weighted average score of 82% based on reviews from 20 critics, indicating "universal acclaim".
