= Boy-Scoutz 'n the Hood =

- The Simpsons episode
- Episode no.: Season 5 Episode 8
- Directed by: Jeffrey Lynch
- Written by: Dan McGrath
- Production code: 1F06
- Original air date: November 18, 1993

Guest appearance
- Ernest Borgnine as himself

Episode features
- Couch gag: The family's eyes all run in darkness – and when the lights come on, the bodies run in after the eyes. The bodies sit down on the couch and lean forward, sticking their eyes in their sockets with a popping sound.
- Commentary: Matt Groening; David Mirkin; Dan Castellaneta; Yeardley Smith; George Meyer; Bob Anderson; David Silverman

Episode chronology
| ← Previous "Bart's Inner Child" | Next → "The Last Temptation of Homer" |
- The Simpsons season 5

"Boy-Scoutz 'n the Hood" is the eighth episode of the fifth season of the American animated television series The Simpsons. It originally aired on the Fox network in the United States on November 18, 1993. In the episode, Bart, intoxicated from an all-syrup Squishee, mistakenly joins the Junior Campers, a Boy Scout-style organization. Homer and Bart join a father-son rafting trip which goes awry when they are stranded at sea with Ned and Rod Flanders.

The episode was written by Dan McGrath and directed by Jeffrey Lynch. Ernest Borgnine guest starred in the episode as himself. He recorded his lines at the Village Recorder in West Los Angeles. The episode makes cultural references to the films My Dinner with Andre, The Terminator, Alien, On the Town, "Crocodile" Dundee, Deliverance, Friday the 13th and Boyz n the Hood (in the title) as well as the song "Sugar, Sugar" by The Archies. Since airing, the episode has received mostly positive reviews from television critics. It acquired a Nielsen rating of 13.0, and was the highest-rated show on the Fox network the week it aired.

== Plot ==
Bart and Milhouse find $20 that Homer lost and order a Super Squishee made entirely of syrup from Apu at the Kwik-E-Mart. With their senses reeling from the high sugar content, they spend the rest of the money on a wild night out on the town. The next morning, Bart wakes up with a hangover, not remembering the previous night's events. Bart soon discovers, to his horror, he joined the Junior Campers during his revelry.

Bart plans to quit the group as soon as possible; however, he decides to give it a chance after learning that Junior Campers can be excused from pop quizzes to go to their meetings. When Bart learns that Junior Campers are allowed to own pocket knives, he continues attending meetings. Homer mocks Bart relentlessly for continuing to be a Junior Camper. When a father-son rafting trip is planned, neither Bart nor Homer wish to go together. To his and Bart's annoyance, Homer inadvertently agrees to accompany Bart. A boy whose father is in prison has "celebrity dad" Ernest Borgnine accompany him. On the rafting trip, Homer is distressed when he learns that he and Bart will share a raft with Ned and his son Rod.

When Homer loses the map after folding it into a makeshift hat that blows away, they paddle the wrong way and find themselves lost at sea, thanks to Homer believing the current will take them back to land. Homer continues to make their situation difficult by eating most of the rations of food they have, using their water to wash his socks, throwing Rod's Walkman into the sea when it stops working and accidentally shooting down a rescue plane with a flare gun. They are stranded with little food or water for several days. The raft springs a leak after Homer accidentally drops a Swiss army knife (which he stole from Ernest Borgnine) he was intending to gift to Bart. All seems lost, but Homer smells the scent of a Krusty Burger on an offshore oil rig. They sail to the Krusty Burger, which is about to go out of business due to a lack of attendance; Homer places a large order, saving the Krusty Burger's business and the castaways. Bart is proud of his father after the rafting party survives their ordeal.

Meanwhile, the rest of the campers (and Borgnine) are getting ready to play a song around the campfire. Just as Borgnine begins the song, he is attacked from behind by a mysterious figure lurking in the shadows.

== Production ==
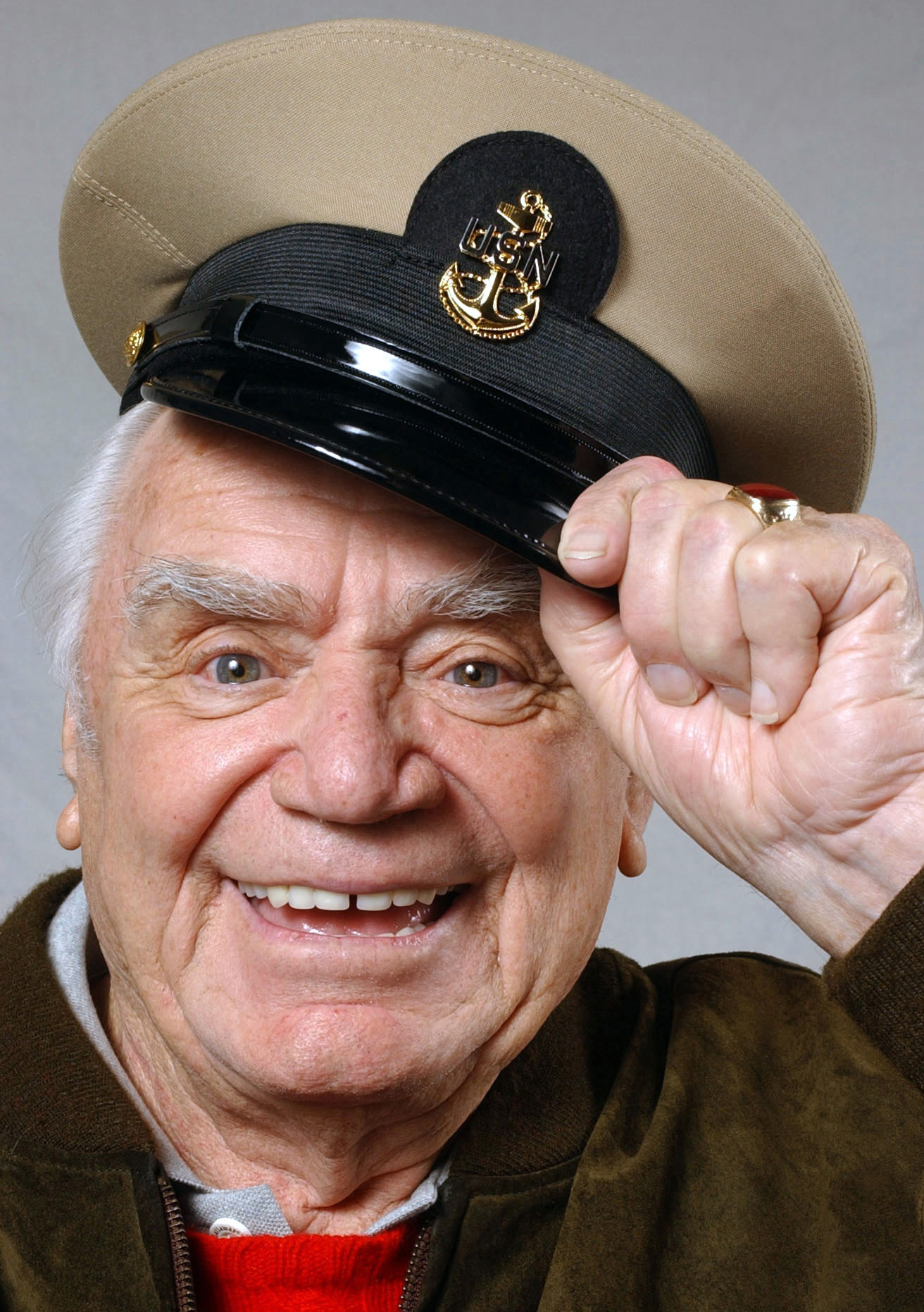
Ernest Borgnine guest-starred as himself in the episode.

"Boy-Scoutz 'n the Hood" was written by Dan McGrath and directed by Jeffrey Lynch. The episode was recorded at the Village Recorder in West Los Angeles. Ernest Borgnine guest starred in the episode as himself. The staff liked his work on the films Marty and From Here to Eternity, so they asked him to do a guest appearance on the show. Borgnine felt he could not say no to the offer because his grandchildren were fans of The Simpsons. In the final scene of the episode, Borgnine plays a guitar and sings campfire songs with the children. Borgnine was a guitar player in real life, so he brought his own guitar with him to the recording studio. Borgnine apologized because he felt that he was not being able to sing very well, but Nancy Cartwright (Bart), thought his voice "added to the authenticity of his character". Matt Groening thought the recording sessions with Borgnine were "so much fun". Hank Azaria, (Apu), remembered that Borgnine "had no idea what the hell he was doing. He's a good actor, and he read his lines just fine, but he had no idea what the show was, no idea what we were doing."

In her book My Life as a 10-Year-Old Boy, Cartwright recalls that she was a fan of Borgnine's performance in Marty. She writes that the film had "changed [her] forever", and that it made her "realize that actors have the power through their work to inspire and enlighten others." She recalls that when Borgnine arrived for the recording session, she "lost all coolness" and ran up to him and exclaimed "ohmygod, Marty!"

== Cultural references ==
When Bart and Milhouse visit the local video arcade at the beginning of the episode, Martin Prince is seen playing a game based on My Dinner with Andre (1981). Other games at the arcade are based on The Terminator (1984) and Alien (1979). The "Springfield, Springfield" number performed by Bart and Milhouse during their night on the town is a reference to the musical number "New York, New York" from the film On the Town, starring Gene Kelly and Frank Sinatra. During a scene in which Hans Moleman and Moe fight with knives, Hans tells Moe, "You call that a knife? This is a knife!", a reference to a line from "Crocodile" Dundee (1986). Ernest Borgnine introduces himself a la Troy McClure to the Junior Campers by recalling his role in From Here to Eternity, to the delight of the campers. As Homer hallucinates, he sings "Sugar, Sugar" by The Archies. While on the raft, Homer misquotes Samuel Taylor Coleridge's The Rime of the Ancient Mariner when he says "Water, water everywhere/So let's all have a drink." (It's supposed to be "But not a drop to drink.") The scene in which Borgnine and the other rafters drift through a dark forest watched by mountain men is a reference to a scene in Deliverance (1972), and the scene features the music from the film's "Dueling Banjos" scene. The unseen person or creature that attacks Borgnine at the end of the episode is implied to be Jason Voorhees from the Friday the 13th film series.

== Reception ==
In its original American broadcast, "Boy-Scoutz 'n the Hood" finished 35th in the ratings for the week of November 15 to 21, 1993, with a Nielsen rating of 13.0, translating to 12.3 million households. The episode was the highest-rated show on the Fox network that week.

Since airing, the episode has received mostly positive reviews from television critics. The authors of the book I Can't Believe It's a Bigger and Better Updated Unofficial Simpsons Guide, Gary Russell and Gareth Roberts, wrote: "A terrific episode, with Homer so stupid it isn't true, yet still saving the day. Seeing Ned Flanders get it wrong is great, but the show-stealer is a toss-up between Borgnine's great self-deprecating role, the ironic seagull, and the dolphins." DVD Movie Guide's Colin Jacobson called it a "brilliant episode from start to finish". He commented that "We see what an amazing amount of goods and services one can purchase in Springfield with only $20, and we get a fun spoof of scouting. Add to that terrific rivalry moments between Bart and Homer and the show excels." Patrick Bromley of DVD Verdict called the plot of the episode "typically inspired", and gave it a grade of A. Bill Gibron of DVD Talk gave the episode a score of 5 out of 5. TV DVD Reviews's Kay Daly wrote: "And just when you think the Simpsons' creators have taken parody as far as it can go, they air an episode like this. The writers cram the 22-minute episode with allusions to movie genres including disaster movies, Broadway musicals, adventure-suspense and classic teen horror." Adam Suraf of Dunkirkma.net named it one of his ten favorite episodes of the show. He called the musical sequence a "classic". Rick Porter of Zap 2 It wrote in that he was not a "fan" of the episode's second half: "Despite the presence of Borgnine, Homer is a little too aggressively stupid for my taste". He thought the first part was "absolutely brilliant", though.

Kurt M. Koenigsberger analyzed a scene from the episode in his piece "Commodity Culture and Its Discontents", published in Leaving Springfield: The Simpsons and the Possibility of Oppositional Culture. He noted that The Simpsons' literary and cultural awareness extends to the "conventions of its own medium". Bart criticizes an Itchy & Scratchy short because Itchy stakes down Scratchy's appendages and props his belly to form a tent with faulty knots. With Homer looking on from the couch, Lisa reminds Bart that "cartoons don't have to be 100% realistic" as a second Homer wanders past the living-room window. Koenigsberger said that "this moment and many others like it reveal a strong sense of self-awareness within the show, an awareness especially characteristic of high modernism."

In the United Kingdom, when the 300th episode was shown, Sky 1 held a Golden D'ohnuts evening, in which viewers voted for their favorite episodes to win in each category. This episode won the category of: Best School Jinx.
