= Growth of a Leader =

1964 painting by Norman Rockwell

- Artist: Norman Rockwell
- Year: 1964
- Medium: Oil on canvas
- Dimensions: 91 cm × 81 cm (36 in × 32 in)
- Location: National Scouting Museum

Growth of a Leader is a 1964 painting by Norman Rockwell. It appeared as the 1966 Brown & Bigelow Boy Scout Calendar. Long-time Rockwell model James Edgerton and his son are depicted as a Scout moving through the stages of a man's Scouting career.

== Creation ==
The Edgerton family lived next to Norman Rockwell for 10 years. During that time, four generations of Edgertons posed for Rockwell. The first time that James "Buddy" Edgerton posed for Rockwell was for the 1945 Boy Scout Calendar illustration, I Will Do My Best, in 1943. The final time was for Growth of a Leader, after Rockwell moved from Arlington, Vermont, to Stockbridge, Massachusetts. Of the four men depicted, three were modeled after Buddy and the fourth, the Cub Scout, was modeled after his son. Since no one in the Edgerton family was involved in Scouting, all of the uniforms were borrowed from friends.

== Composition ==
The painting depicts the stages a man goes through as he moves through the Scouting program, in front of an American flag. The cycle starts with a young Cub Scout. As the boy becomes older he moves to the Boy Scout and then the Sea Scout/Explorer (modern day Venturing) programs. The Sea Scout has an Eagle Scout pin on his uniform. Finally, the man, with flecks of gray in his temples, becomes a Scoutmaster. Each of the figures is looking at a single point off of the canvasing, giving them the feeling of being united in a single purpose.

== Meaning ==
The painting represents the increase in maturity a Scout gains as he goes through the program. This is shown by the physical changes to each of the figures and by the change in expression on each of their faces.
