= The Scoutmaster =

1956 painting by Norman Rockwell

- Artist: Norman Rockwell
- Year: 1956
- Medium: Oil on canvas
- Dimensions: 117 cm × 84 cm (46 in × 33 in)
- Location: National Scouting Museum

The Scoutmaster is a 1956 painting by American illustrator Norman Rockwell. It was originally created by Rockwell for the 1956 Brown & Bigelow Boy Scout Calendar. Since then, it has become one of the most collected images that Rockwell created for the Boy Scouts of America.

== Creation ==
Rockwell set out to create a painting dedicated to the Scoutmasters of the United States. In 1953, he visited the 4th National Scout jamboree at Irvine Ranch. Rockwell, who used photographs as a source for his paintings, was staging a photo shoot at the jamboree. He approached a Scoutmaster from Oakland and asked him for four boys to pose for a photo. One of the four chosen was Howard Lincoln who would become the chairman of Nintendo of America and later the CEO of the Seattle Mariners. Lincoln is directly to the right of the campfire. The four Scouts set up tents and built a fire in the middle of a 90 °F (32 °C) day. Rockwell found a professional Scouter at the jamboree headquarters to pose as the Scoutmaster for the all-day photo shoot.

Later that year, Lincoln and the other three Scouts each received a $25 check and a letter from Rockwell asking them to sign a release. Over the course of the next three years, Rockwell turned the daytime pictures into a nighttime painting. The tents in the painting were modified to be civilian tents with guylines and sidewalls instead of military-style pup tents. It debuted as the 1956 Boy Scout Calendar published by Brown & Bigelow.

== Composition ==
The painting is a late night scene that features a Scoutmaster, in full uniform, looking into the dying remains of a campfire. The cookware for that night's dinner is still visible. In the background four Scouts are asleep in two tents. Lincoln is in a white shirt directly to the right of the Scoutmaster; his face is visible.

== Reception and legacy ==
The Scoutmaster received praise from Peggy Heinkel-Wolfe who referred it is as one of Rockwell's "master works".

The painting was utilized by the Boy Scouts of America as the cover art for the 1960 edition of the Scoutmaster's Handbook and an issue of the magazine Boys' Life.
