= Los Angeles Homeless Services Authority =

American county agency

Agency overview
- Formed: 1993; 33 years ago
- Jurisdiction: Los Angeles County
- Headquarters: Downtown Los Angeles, California; 34.04921465463542°N 118.25702005270897°W
- Employees: 750+
- Annual budget: US$845,367,023 (FY 2022-2023)
- Agency executive: Gita O’Neill, Chief Executive
- Website: www.lahsa.org

Los Angeles Homeless Services Authority (LAHSA) is the lead agency responsible for coordinating housing and social services for the homeless in Los Angeles County. LAHSA allocates funds and administers contracts with regional agencies that provide emergency, transitional and permanent housing, and other services that assist homeless individuals. In the 2022-2023 fiscal year, LAHSA had an annual budget of US$845,367,023 (equivalent to $930,057,533 in 2025). LAHSA is governed by a 10-member board of commissioners, five of whom are appointed by the Mayor of Los Angeles, while the remaining five are appointed by the Los Angeles County Board of Supervisors.

== History ==
LAHSA was established in 1993 as a joint powers authority between the city and county of Los Angeles. The formation of LAHSA was a result of a lawsuit settlement in 1991, addressing limited access to a state-mandated welfare program called General Relief.

In 2005, LAHSA began conducting an annual homeless count.

In 2021, LAHSA increased its base salary for employees to $50,000 in response to findings that some staff were experiencing homelessness.

In January 2023, Va Lecia Adams Kellum was appointed as LAHSA's chief executive, receiving an annual salary of US$430,000 (equivalent to $454,374 in 2025). Adams Kellum is close to Mayor Karen Bass and previously ran St. Joseph Center, a homeless nonprofit organization in Venice.

== Controversies ==
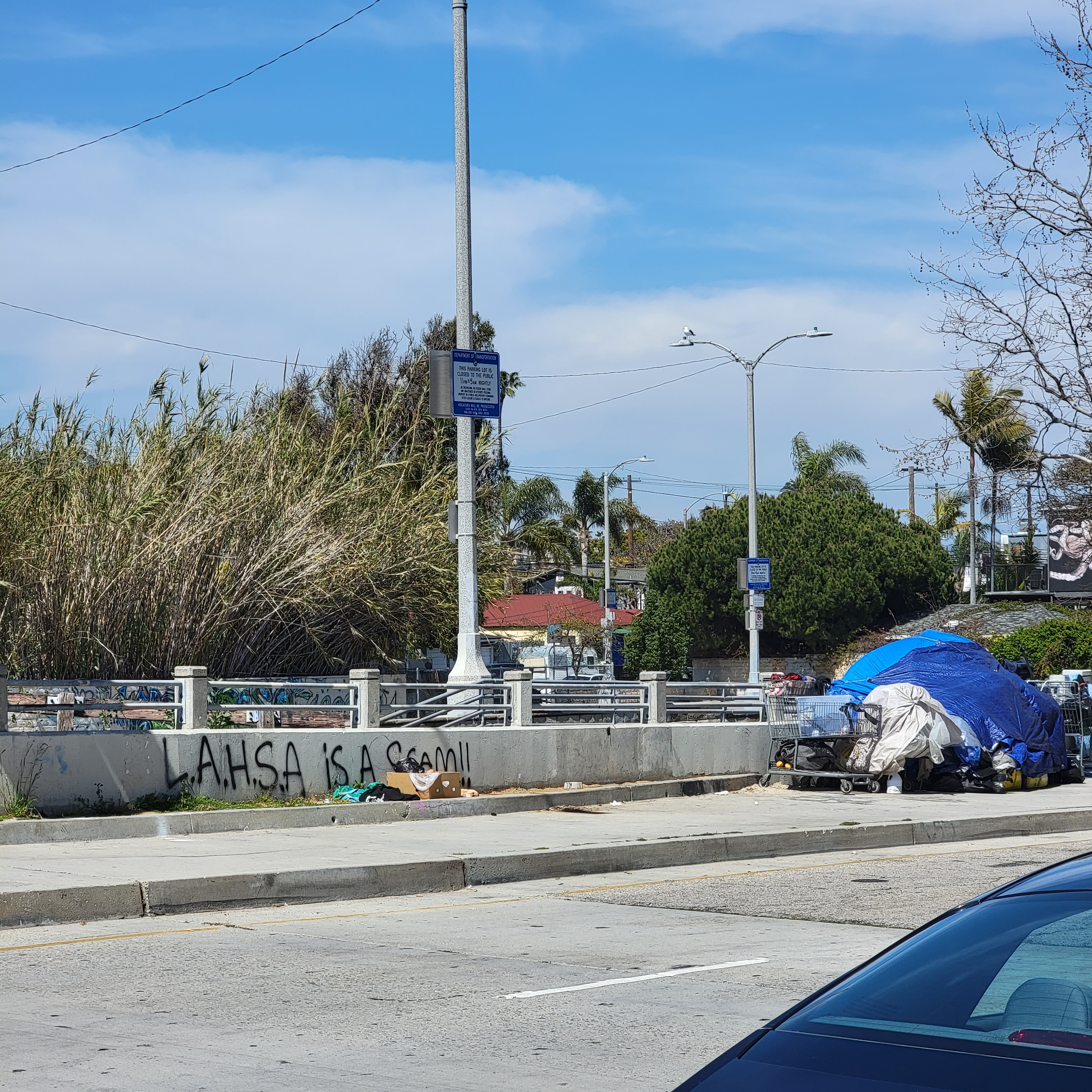
Graffiti in Venice decries the Los Angeles Homeless Services Authority as a scam, 2023

LAHSA has been critiqued for its ineffective handling of homelessness in California, including areas such as homeless outreach and spending oversight. Between 2015 and 2022, LAHSA's funding increased 13 times, from $63 million to $808 million, while homelessness increased 1.6 times. The accuracy of several annual LAHSA homeless counts, including in 2021 and 2022 has been challenged by Los Angeles city officials.

In August 2019, a Los Angeles City Controller audit found that despite doubling its outreach staffing between 2016 and 2018, LAHSA continued to miss the majority of its own outreach goals, including placements into housing, temporary shelter, and referrals for substance abuse and mental health treatment.

In January 2022, the United States Department of Housing and Urban Development released a report identifying significant issues with spending oversight within LAHSA. Elected politicians, including Joe Buscaino, have publicly criticized the agency.

In May 2022, an investigative news report found that LAHSA outreach workers were throwing out food intended for the homeless at the end of each workday. The findings prompted criticism from LAHSA board members and the Los Angeles City Attorney Mike Feuer for waste of taxpayer-funded resources.

In February 2025, an investigative report found that LAHSA chief executive Va Lecia Adams Kellum -- already facing other controversies -- signed a $2.1 million contract and two contract amendments with an agency whose senior leadership includes her own husband, Edward Kellum. LAHSA's own ethics rules forbid such a conflict of interest; a decision was imposed by LAHSA's 10-member governing commission in August 2023 to specifically exclude Adams Kellum from signing the agreement involving the company her husband helps run. Despite this, Adams Kellum signed the contract months later.

In April 2025, the Los Angeles County Board of Supervisors moved to terminate its contract with LAHSA, redirecting approximately $300 million in annual funding to a newly created county department. This decision followed a series of critical audits and a court-mandated financial review that highlighted persistent issues with fiscal transparency, contract management, and delays in provider payments. While LAHSA leadership pointed to systemic complexities within the regional homelessness response, the County cited a lack of administrative accountability as the primary justification for reclaiming direct control over these services. In response, the approximately 400 LAHSA jobs have been cut.

== See also ==
- Homelessness in California
