= George Harvey Ralphson =

American writer

George Harvey Ralphson was a collective pen name used by multiple ghost writers of juvenile adventure books working for M.A. Donohue & Company in the early 20th century. According to the Los Angeles Times and the New York Times, several of the books credited to Ralphson may have been written by J. Frank Honeywell. The best-known works credited to Ralphson were the "Boy Scout" series of adventures. Several sources have erroneously reported that he was a real person.

== Selected bibliography ==
- Boy Scouts in Mexico (1911)
- Boy Scouts in the Canal Zone (1911)
- Boy Scouts in the Philippines (1911)
- Boy Scouts On Motor Cycles (1912)
- Boy Scouts in a Submarine (1912)
- Boy Scouts in a Motor Boat (1912)
- Boy Scouts in the Northwest (1912)
- Boy Scout Camera Club (1913)
- Boy Scouts Beyond The Arctic Circle (1913)
- Boy Scouts In California (1913)
- Boy Scout Electricians (1913)
- Boy Scouts on Old Superior (1913)
- Boy Scouts in Death Valley or the City in the Sky (1914)
- Boy Scouts on the Open Plains (1914)
- Boy Scouts on Hudson Bay (1914)
- Boy Scouts in Belgium (1915)
- Boy Scouts In Southern Waters (1915)
- Boy Scouts In An Airship (1915)
- Boy Scouts In The North Sea (1915)
- Boy Scouts Mysterious Signal (1916)
- Over There With The Marines At Chateau Thierry (1919)
- Over There With The Canadians At Vimy Ridge (1919)
- Over There With The Tanks In The Argonne Forest (1920)
