= 759: Boy Scouts of Harlem =

- Theatrical poster
- Directed by: Jake Boritt & Justin Szlasa
- Written by: Justin Szlasa
- Produced by: Justin Szlasa
- Starring: Keith Dozier; Okpoti Sowah; Ann Dozier; Colin "KC" Byers; Emmanuel Nortey
- Edited by: Justin Szlasa; Manahi Taber-Kewene
- Release date: May 1, 2009
- Running time: 72 minutes
- Language: English

759: Boy Scouts of Harlem is a family documentary about Boy Scout Troop 759, which meets in Harlem. It was directed by Jake Boritt and Justin Szlasa who also produced, wrote, and edited the film.

The film premiered as a free community event on March 14, 2009, at the Schomburg Center for Research in Black Culture in Harlem on Lenox Avenue. Two weeks later it screened on board the Intrepid Sea-Air-Space Museum in Manhattan, then on October 8, 2009, Senator Jeff Sessions and Senator Ben Nelson sponsored a screening on Capitol Hill. The film aired on public television stations around the country starting in August 2010, as presented by Maryland Public Television.

== Premise ==
The film follows four Boy Scouts and two Scout leaders, from the streets of Harlem to the woods of Camp Keowa on Crystal Lake in the Catskills. The newest Scout, eleven-year-old Keith Dozier, spends his first week at camp facing the challenges of the woods: the dock test in the deep lake, creatures of the night, the climbing tower, the raucous dining hall, and the kitchen. vWith help from his fellow Scouts and Scoutmaster Sowah, young Keith faces the challenges and earns his place as a Scout.

== Subjects ==
The Scoutmaster of Troop 759 is Okpoti Sowah, who was born in what is now Ghana. Sowah came to the United States to pursue his education and eventually earned a master's degree from Columbia University. The assistant Scoutmaster is Ann Dozier and the featured Scouts are Keith Dozier, Devon Howard, Emmanuel Nortey and the late Colin 'K. C.' Byers (1993–2011). Camp Keowa Staff include Andy Cabrera, John X. Restrepo and Marina Chernykh.
