= Gilligan's Island season 1 =

Gilligan's Island
- Season 1
- No. of episodes: 36

Release
- Original network: CBS
- Original release: September 26, 1964 – June 12, 1965

Season chronology
- Next → Season 2

The first season of the American comedy television series Gilligan's Island was shown in the United States on September 26, 1964 and concluded on June 12, 1965 on CBS. The season introduced the comic adventures of seven castaways as they attempted to survive and escape from an island on which they had been shipwrecked. Most episodes revolved around the dissimilar castaways' conflicts and their failed attempts—invariably Gilligan's fault—to escape their plight. The season originally aired on Saturdays at 8:30-9:00 pm (EST).

== Production ==
Executive producers for the first season included William Froug and series creator Sherwood Schwartz. Filming took place at the CBS Radford Studios complex in Studio City, Los Angeles California. This complex contained 17 sound stages, as well as special effects and prop departments. On one stage, a lagoon had been constructed by the production company "at great expense". According to Bob Denver, the crew would spend half their days filming scenes in the lagoon. Shots and sequences involving the characters were filmed in a different soundstage. After the series was cancelled, the show's lagoon was not dismantled, and it remained in place until 1995, when it was converted into a parking lot.

== Cast ==
The series employed an ensemble cast of seven main actors and actresses. Denver played the role of the titular First Mate Gilligan, a bumbling, naive, and accident-prone crewman who often messes up the castaways chances of rescue. Alan Hale, Jr. portrayed The Skipper, captain of the S.S. Minnow and the older friend of Gilligan. Jim Backus appeared as Thurston Howell III, a millionaire, and Natalie Schafer played his wife, Eunice Lovelle Wentworth Howell. Tina Louise played the role of Ginger Grant, a famous movie star. Russell Johnson portrayed Professor Roy Hinkley, Ph.D., a high school science teacher who often used his scientific background for ways to get the castaways off the island. Dawn Wells played Mary Ann Summers, a wholesome farm girl from Kansas. Charles Maxwell was the uncredited voice of the radio announcer, to whom the castaways would often listen.

== Broadcast history ==
The season aired Saturdays from 8:30-9:00 pm (EST) on CBS. It was the only season filmed in black-and-white.

== DVD release ==
The DVD was released by Warner Home Video, with the pilot episode as a bonus episode.

== Episodes ==
| No. overall | No. in season | Title | Directed by | Written by | Original release date | Prod. code | U.S. households (in millions) |
|---|---|---|---|---|---|---|---|
| 1 | 1 | "Two on a Raft" | John Rich | Lawrence J. Cohen & Fred Freeman | September 26, 1964 | 1625–0703 | 11.94 |
The first episode picks up after the events related in the theme song, with the castaways marooned on a deserted, uncharted island following a violent storm. Skipper Jonas Grumby (Alan Hale Jr.) and First Mate Gilligan (Bob Denver) are building a raft to sail for help. Ginger and Mary Ann are sewing together a sail for the raft. The Professor finds evidence that headhunters were once on the island and may be on neighboring islands. The Skipper and Gilligan set sail and are out for three days and have found nothing. They encounter some sharks who take bites out of their raft. There isn't much raft left and then a storm starts up. Skipper and Gilligan wind up back on an island, but they don't know it's the same one. They start a fire. Seeing the smoke, the remaining castaways are worried about possible headhunters. Skipper and Gilligan find footprints. Each group now believe the other are the headhunters. The Professor finds a cave for the others to hide in and he wants to set a trap with some stones he found. Skipper and Gilligan find the cave. They avoid the trap and go in. The others show up and go in the cave as well. After some confusion, everyone realizes who they are. Because Gilligan triggered the trap, they have trouble getting out of the cave. Charles Maxwell as Radio Announcer (voice). Note: Part of this episode was filmed in Moloaa Bay, Kauaʻi, Hawaii.
| 2 | 2 | "Home Sweet Hut" | Richard Donner | Bill Davenport & Charles Tannen | October 3, 1964 | 1625–0705 | 10.63 |
After a storm hits the island, the Skipper decides they need to build a large hut to protect everyone. The Professor believes storm season is approaching, so they will need to start building right away. The radio says that the Coast Guard has given up the search for the S.S. Minnow. Despite many setbacks caused by Gilligan, the hut gets built. That night, the Howells get into an argument and wake everyone up. The gang decides they're unwilling to all share the same dwelling. They break up into teams to construct four separate huts. The Skipper gets upset when Gilligan keeps lending out their tools. Something Gilligan does causes the Professor's hut to collapse. Gilligan then destroys Ginger and Mary Ann's hut. And then he ruins the Howells’ hut. The gang builds another community hut and a bad storm hits. The hut survives the storm but winds up floating in the lagoon.
| 3 | 3 | "Voodoo Something to Me" | John Rich | Austin Kalish & Elroy Schwartz | October 10, 1964 | 1625–0701 | 11.15 |
The castaways find Gilligan asleep while on sentry duty. Skipper fires their nightly flare in hopes someone will see it. The next morning, the Skipper and Gilligan find their supply hut had been robbed. The castaways now believe a convict may be loose on the island. The Skipper and the Professor decide to search the island, but the Skipper thinks it's voodoo. Skipper winds up in a trap that Gilligan set for the convict and is hanging upside down. That night Gilligan is attacked by something while he's in the supply hut. Skipper mentions to the others the possibility of voodoo, but the Professor dismisses that idea. While searching the island, Gilligan falls into a mud pit. He jumps into the lagoon to clean off and then throws his clothes on the ground. He doesn't see it but a chimpanzee comes by and takes his clothes. Seeing the chimp in Gilligan's clothes, the Skipper believes it's Gilligan turned into a chimp. Skipper takes the clothes off and gives the chimp his hat. The chimp runs off. While walking around in the dark, Gilligan comes across the stuff taken from the supply hut. He then sees the chimp with Skipper's hat and thinks the voodoo has gotten to Skipper. The castaways figure out that the chimp was the one that robbed them. Gilligan somehow manages to destroy all the flares.
| 4 | 4 | "Goodnight, Sweet Skipper" | Ida Lupino | Dick Conway & Roland MacLane | October 17, 1964 | 1625–0706 | 10.78 |
Skipper is sleepwalking by the lagoon and thinks he's still fighting in Guadalcanal during WW2. Gilligan witnesses Skipper thinking he's converting a radio into a transmitter. The next day, Skipper and Professor are listening to the radio broadcast of aviatrix Alice McNeil on her around the world flight. Skipper figures she will soon pass over the island. Gilligan tells the men about Skipper making a transmitter. The catch is that he can only do it when he sleepwalks. Skipper is having a hard time falling back asleep. Gilligan gets some tranquilizers from Mr. Howell. The only problem is that everyone drops a couple pills in the Skipper's drink. Skipper is pretty heavily drugged but after a while he does sleepwalk. They get to the lagoon and Gilligan does something to wake Skipper up. Professor then hypnotizes Skipper and they get the conversion instructions from him. But it doesn't work on the radio. Everyone goes to bed except Gilligan. He bangs on the radio and is able to contact Alice McNeil. Gilligan gets Skipper and shows him what he did and breaks the radio. Note: With June Foray as the voice of aviatrix Alice McNeil.
| 5 | 5 | "Wrongway Feldman" | Ida Lupino | Fred Freeman & Lawrence J. Cohen | October 24, 1964 | 1625–0708 | 13.31 |
Gilligan discovers a damaged plane on the island. Professor believes he might be able to repair it, but none of them know how to fly the plane. They learn that the plane belongs to famed aviator Wrongway Feldman (Hans Conried in his first of two guest appearances). The castaways are stunned when Wrongway comes out from the bushes. Wrongway tells them how he managed to survive all those years. That night, Ginger, then Thurston, each beg Wrongway to take them with when he leaves. But Wrongway just falls back asleep. The plane is finally repaired. But each time Wrongway is about to take off, something goes wrong with the plane as if it had been sabotaged. Thinking there might be someone else on the island, the men decide to stand guard around the plane. The next morning, Wrongway is missing. Gilligan finds Wrongway and he makes a confession. Turns out Wrongway sabotaged the plane, as he doesn't feel he can fly anymore after all that time. Gilligan doesn't tell the others and convinces Wrongway to teach him how to fly the plane. Wrongway does eventually take off and makes it back to New York. However, he can't give accurate directions back to the island.
| 6 | 6 | "President Gilligan" | Richard Donner | Roland Wolpert | October 31, 1964 | 1625–0707 | 8.15 |
Skipper and Professor have been planning on digging a new well. Mr. Howell and the Skipper square off over who is in charge. The castaways decide they need to elect a President of the island. Howell and Skipper both try to influence the others votes. After the castaways cast their votes, they are surprised when Gilligan wins. Gilligan's not sure he knows how to be the President. Skipper offers to help him as Vice President. Mr. Howell volunteers to be Chief Justice of the Supreme Court. During dinner, Gilligan is trying to give a speech about digging the new well but no one is paying attention. The next few days Gilligan continues to try to talk about the well, but still gets no response. Gilligan is digging the well himself while everyone stands around complaining about things. Howell suggests impeaching Gilligan. Just as Gilligan says he will quit being President, he strikes water. Later, Gilligan suggests building a lookout tower. When he asks for volunteers, everyone leaves.
| 7 | 7 | "Sound of Quacking" | Thomas Montgomery | Lawrence J. Cohen & Fred Freeman | November 7, 1964 | 1625–0711 | 11.57 |
There is a blight on the island and food is scarce. Everyone has to ration their meals and they're not happy. A migratory duck lands in the lagoon. The Professor wants to attach a message to the duck and hope for a rescue. But Gilligan frightens the bird away. Gilligan does finally capture the bird. Most of the others want to eat it. Professor puts a note on the duck. They release the duck, but it flies back to them. The duck lays an egg. They believe it will be able to fly now, but it doesn't. Skipper wants to cook the bird. Gilligan is determined to protect the duck. Gilligan has a dream that he's a Marshall in the wild west and he's guarding the duck. Dance hall hostess Ginger comes by and tries to seduce Gilligan into giving her the duck. Bad guys Professor and Howell come for the duck, but Gilligan scares them away. Marshall Gilligan accidentally shoots the duck. The next day, the duck helps them with their food shortage. They release the duck and it flies away. But Gilligan forgot to put the message on it. Note: Mel Blanc voices the duck. Ironically, the dream sequence was filmed on the set of Gunsmoke, which replaced Gilligan's Island in its time slot for season 4, cancelling the show.
| 8 | 8 | "Goodbye Island" | John Rich | Albert E. Lewin & Burt Styler | November 21, 1964 | 1625–0702 | 11.31 |
The Professor is trying to make homemade nails to repair the Minnow, but is not having much luck. Gilligan discovers the perfect, permanent glue from tree sap when trying to make pancake syrup. The castaways decide to use this "glue" to patch the wreckage of the Minnow. Thanks to Gilligan's clumsiness, he gets his foot glued to the boat. Then Gilligan gets Skipper glued as well. Professor believes a perfume might dissolve the glue and free the men. After they are freed, Skipper finishes glueing the boat. Shortly before they are to sail off, Gilligan discovers that the glue is not so permanent after all. Thurston wants to have a launching ceremony before they leave. Gilligan tries to tell them that the glue won't hold. Skipper doesn't believe him and gives the boat a hard tap. This causes the Minnow to completely fall apart.
| 9 | 9 | "The Big Gold Strike" | Stanley Z. Cherry | Roland Wolpert | November 28, 1964 | 1625–0713 | 11.68 |
While golfing, Mr. Howell and Gilligan discover a gold mine on the island. Meanwhile, Mary Ann, Ginger and the Skipper find the S.S. Minnow's inflatable life raft in the lagoon. Thurston wants Gilligan to keep the mine a secret under the guise of not wanting the others to get greedy. Howell really wants the gold for himself. Because Gilligan is spending a lot of time repairing the raft, he has to dig up the gold for Thurston at night. The others start to wonder why Gilligan is so tired. That night they follow Gilligan and find out about the gold. Soon greed and 'gold fever' overcomes the castaways. Howell refuses to share the gold with the others. They start digging on their own, but don't find any gold. They decide to charge large amounts of money to the Howells for tools, meals and candles. Despite warnings not to take weighty things aboard the raft, everyone tries to smuggle some gold onto the raft, causing it to sink. The gold winds up on the bottom of the lagoon and everyone regrets being greedy. When Gilligan finds a pearl in an oyster, greed overcomes the castaways again.
| 10 | 10 | "Waiting for Watubi" | Jack Arnold | Fred Freeman & Lawrence J. Cohen | December 5, 1964 | 1625–0715 | 11.62 |
Skipper digs up a tiki idol, a small statue of Kona, the god of evil. Skipper believes he is cursed as he disturbed its resting place. Suddenly there is a small earthquake on the island. Professor says it's just a coincidence. Skipper decides to rebury the idol hoping to break the curse. The Howells see him do this and believing the idol is valuable, they dig it up and hide it in their cabin. Skipper and Gilligan are sent to retrieve something from the Howells’ cabin. Skipper is shocked to see the idol. He asks Gilligan to bury it again. While he's going to bury it, Gilligan becomes frightened and just tosses the idol away. Mary Ann finds the idol. To cheer Skipper up, they decide to throw him a party. Mary Ann gives him the idol as a gift and Skipper runs off. Skipper believes only a visit from the Great Watubi, an ancient witch doctor, will remove the curse. Skipper gets even more depressed and wants to give Gilligan his prized possessions. The Professor has Gilligan, disguised in fanciful headdress and makeup, pretend to be Watubi.
| 11 | 11 | "Angel on the Island" | Jack Arnold | Herbert Finn & Alan Dinehart | December 12, 1964 | 1625–0718 | 10.52 |
Ginger is missing and Mary Ann has noticed she's been acting strangely lately. Gilligan finds her crying. Ginger is sad because she isn't able to appear in a play that would have made her a star. Mr. Howell agrees to back Ginger's off-Broadway, on-island show. And Thurston will also direct the play. Ginger will play Cleopatra and Skipper is Marc Antony. During a rehearsal, Lovey doesn't like the way Thurston is complimenting Ginger. Lovey believes that she should be the star of her husband's show, and he is forced to oblige. Ginger refuses to play a smaller role. Gilligan wants to talk to Skipper about Ginger and he keeps bothering him during rehearsal. Gilligan tells Lovey how sad Ginger is. Lovey realizes how badly Ginger wanted to play the part, so she fakes laryngitis. The play goes on and Gilligan has to play a wide variety of roles. Thurston realizes that Lovey didn't really lose her voice and was being kind. Note: According to the show's theme song, Ginger was already a movie star. However, this episode infers that the shipwreck had prevented her debut on Broadway, so now she won't be "discovered" in Hollywood.
| 12 | 12 | "Birds Gotta Fly, Fish Gotta Talk" | Rod Amateau | Sherwood Schwartz and Austin Kalish and Elroy Schwartz | December 19, 1964 | 1625–0704 | 11.52 |
Gilligan's Christmas wish appears to be coming true when a radio broadcast tells them their rescue is imminent.While they wait, Skipper recalls the first days on the island. Flashback to Professor hopes to fix the transmitter. Gilligan tries to cheer up Mary Ann and Ginger. Skipper forces Gilligan to climb a tall coconut tree to look around the island. Gilligan sees a boat and some people and thinks they're saved. The boat is the Minnow. Gilligan causes the radio and transmitter to be lost in the ocean. Back to the present, the radio states that the rescue boat is close to getting the castaways. Flashing back again, Gilligan finds the radio in a fish. The castaways then find the transmitter in another fish. After Professor repairs the transmitter again, Gilligan destroys it by dropping firewood on it. Back to the present. In the end, it turns out it was another set of castaways that get rescued. It's Christmas Eve and Santa, who bears a striking resemblance to the Skipper, tries to cheer everyone up. He tells them that they could have wound up on an island without food or fresh water. This certainly makes their situation easier to bear. Note: This show contains footage from the original pilot, excluding the footage with John Gabriel as the Professor, Nancy McCarthy as Bunny and Kit Smythe as Ginger, all of whom had since been recast or replaced in new footage with Russell Johnson, Tina Louise and Dawn Wells.
| 13 | 13 | "Three Million Dollars More or Less" | Thomas Montgomery | Story by : Sam Locke & Joel Rapp; Teleplay by : Bill Davenport & Charles Tannen | December 26, 1964 | 1625–0710 | N/A |
Mr. Howell challenges Gilligan to a putting contest and has a double or nothing financial bet on each hole in one. They're at it all day and Gilligan winds up winning $3 million. Suddenly everyone is very friendly to Gilligan. Howell pays off his debt by giving Gilligan the deed to an oil company in Dust Bowl, Oklahoma. Skipper believes it to be worthless property. Everyone is upset with Howell for cheating Gilligan. Then a radio report states that Gilligan's oil field is suddenly producing vast amounts of oil. Once again, everyone wants a piece of Gilligan and his newfound riches. Howell invites Gilligan over for dinner. Skipper goes with because he doesn't trust Howell. Howell winds up winning his oil company back by beating Skipper at several games of pool. The next day a radio report states that the oil came from a tanker truck that was buried in the sand. The company is once again worthless.
| 14 | 14 | "Water, Water Everywhere" | Stanley Z. Cherry | Tom Waldman & Frank Waldman | January 2, 1965 | 1625–0714 | 14.36 |
A spring on the island has dried up causing the castaways water supply to run short. They are now forced to ration their remaining water. Skipper believes a divining rod is the answer, but Gilligan breaks it. Skipper puts Gilligan in charge of guarding the remaining water. Gilligan is easily distracted and a few of the castaways resort to stealing some. But the Skipper catches them and they return the water. Gilligan makes another divining rod. But then he pokes a hole in the water container releasing all of it. Professor builds a machine to help dig a well. The Howells try a rain dance. Gilligan is writing a note to the others about how sorry he is that he always ruins things. Suddenly a wet frog appears and Gilligan follows it. Mary Ann finds Gilligan's note and shows it to Skipper. They're afraid he might do something drastic. The frog leads Gilligan to an underground cave full of fresh water and Gilligan falls in. The Skipper finds Gilligan and falls into the cave as well. The others show up and there's an explosive way to get Gilligan and Skipper out. Note: This is the first of three times Gilligan runs away.
| 15 | 15 | "So Sorry, My Island Now" | Alan Crosland, Jr. | David P. Harmon | January 9, 1965 | 1625–0719 | 14.41 |
Gilligan is in the lagoon looking for lobsters. He sees what he thinks is a sea serpent and goes to tell the others. What he really saw was the periscope to a tiny one man submarine. Inside the sub is a Japanese sailor (Vito Scotti in his first of four guest appearances). Thinking it's still WWII, the sailor captures Mr. Howell who he believes is an officer. Gilligan and Ginger are looking for Howell and the sailor grabs Ginger. All the others, except Gilligan and Skipper, are captured and put in bamboo cages. Professor tries to tell the sailor that the war is over. Gilligan and Skipper find the sailor's sub. Skipper wants to sail the sub to Hawaii and get help, but he gets stuck trying to get into it. Gilligan then gets into the sub, but just sails it in circles because he can't read the controls. Ginger tries to flatter the sailor into letting them go, but he doesn't. The sailor falls asleep and Gilligan manages to get his rifle and the keys to the cages. The sailor gets back into his sub and tries to leave, but Gilligan also has his glasses.
| 16 | 16 | "Plant You Now, Dig You Later" | Lawrence Dobkin | Elroy Schwartz & Oliver Crawford | January 16, 1965 | 1625–0717 | 14.94 |
Gilligan uncovers a treasure chest while digging a barbecue pit for Mr. Howell. The chest is heavy and is chained closed. Skipper tries to get the chain off with no luck. Everyone is excited to learn the contents of the chest. Both Gilligan and Howell lay claim to the chest. That night, everyone comes up with the idea to pick the lock on the chain. They all surprise each other at the chest and go back to bed. Skipper and Howell decide to play a game of poker to see who gets the chest with each pretending to not play poker very well. Instead, a court will be held, with the Professor as the judge, to decide rightful ownership. The trial begins and neither side is making any progress. The Professor rules that the chest should belong to everyone. But after Howell offers the others $500,000 for their shares, it is revealed that the chest contained cannonballs. The others decide not to hold Howell to his offer.
| 17 | 17 | "Little Island, Big Gun" | Abner Biberman | Dick Conway & Roland MacLane | January 23, 1965 | 1625–0720 | 12.41 |
It's late at night and two men row their small boat to the island. Gangster Jackson Farrell (Larry Storch) plans to hide out on the island after he stole half a million dollars. Jackson tells his partner Gates to come back when things have cooled down. The next day, Gilligan runs into Jackson. Jackson tells him he also was shipwrecked. He says that he's a doctor and was going to help natives. The money he has with him was to be used to build a hospital. Gilligan introduces Jackson to the others. Gilligan hears who Jackson really is on their radio. Now that his true identity has been revealed, Jackson pulls out his gun and ties the castaways up for the night. The next day Skipper and Gilligan want to drop some coconuts on Jackson's head from on top of a hut. Gilligan falls off the roof. Ginger tries to get Jackson's gun by flirting with him, but it doesn't work. Jackson sees a two men from a rival mob coming to the island. Jackson has all the castaways but Mary Ann dress up as natives to scare them away. Lucky and Hank (Louis Quinn) try to communicate with the natives and then leave. Later, Gates arrives to pick up Jackson. Thanks to Gilligan, as Jackson is leaving the island, his money gets destroyed. The radio broadcasts that the Coast Guard caught Jackson and his gang.
| 18 | 18 | "'X' Marks the Spot" | Jack Arnold | Sherwood Schwartz & Elroy Schwartz | January 30, 1965 | 1625–0721 | 13.99 |
At the Pentagon, Maj. Adams (Harry Lauter) and Gen. Bryan (Russell Thorson) discuss testing the Operation Powderkeg missile. The new deadly missile will destroy everything within 100 miles of its path. On the island, the batteries in the radio have gone dead. Professor figures out a way to recharge the batteries. The castaways hear on their radio that the Pentagon will soon launch the missile. From the coordinates given, Skipper figures the island is ground zero. There is a glitch in the warhead, but the Pentagon will fire the missile anyway to test its guidance system and not announce that the warhead is not functional. The castaways are preparing for what could be the end. Professor then figures that before the missile is launched, a search plane will check the landing area to make sure there are no people around. The castaways believe that they will be rescued. They will use a large mirror to signal the plane. A plane does fly by, but Gilligan breaks the mirror. They hear on the radio that the missile was launched. The missile crashes onto the island, but doesn't detonate. Believing it still may explode, the Professor has Gilligan try to disarm it. Gilligan does something wrong and the missile goes gliding across the lagoon with him inside. Everyone is happy when Gilligan returns.
| 19 | 19 | "Gilligan Meets Jungle Boy" | Lawrence Dobkin | Al Schwartz, Howard Merrill & Howard Harris | February 6, 1965 | 1625–0716 | 13.73 |
Gilligan finds a jungle boy (Kurt Russell) on the island. Gilligan tells Skipper and Professor what he saw but they don't believe him. Later, the boy takes Gilligan to a natural source of helium on the island. Gilligan brings the boy back to camp and the ladies try to teach him some English. The Professor plans to use the helium to get rescued with a makeshift hot-air balloon. Mary Ann and Ginger start to sew rain coats together to make the balloon. The boy has a good time watching the men build the balloon and basket. The men argue over who will leave in the balloon. It's decided that Skipper will go. But he's too heavy and the bottom of the basket breaks off. It's suggested that they send the boy with a note, but then they decide to just put a note in the basket. Before the note can be placed in the basket, the boy gets in, cuts the lines and the balloon floats off. Which is no help for rescue as he can't speak any real English. The radio says that the boy and balloon landed on an aircraft carrier.
| 20 | 20 | "St. Gilligan and the Dragon" | Richard Donner | Arnold & Lois Peyser | February 13, 1965 | 1625–0712 | 16.73 |
The women tired of being held subservient to the men and, inspired by the ancient Greek comedy Lysistrata, decide to separate and build their own camp. The men think the women will be back by night fall. The women think the men will beg them to come back. The men soon realize how much they need the women, and so they try to scare the women back by dressing as a dragon. However, Ginger was wise to their plan. It's been four days and neither side is giving in. Skipper dreams he's a Maharaja and the women are waiting on him hand and foot. Thurston dreams the women are giving him a manicure. Professor dreams he's a famous actor and the women are his adoring fans. Gilligan dreams he's a Matador and the women give him presents. The men decide to give up. Howell goes to the ladies cabin and they throw water on him. Both the men and women are reunited when they are frightened by something strange on the island. It turns out to be a lost weather balloon, but Gilligan destroys it before they can put it to use.
| 21 | 21 | "Big Man on a Little Stick" | Tony Leader | Charles Tannen & Lou Huston | February 20, 1965 | 1625–0722 | 15.15 |
Super surfer Duke Williams (Denny Miller) rides a tsunami onto the island. Once he's rested up, Duke meets Ginger and Mary Ann. The girls are very attracted to muscular Duke. When the Howells hear about Duke, they think there's royalty on the island. Gilligan starts working out so the girls will look at him, but it doesn't go well. Professor predicts that there will be another tsunami that will head toward Hawaii in two days. Gilligan tries to learn how to surf, but gets nowhere. Duke makes an aggressive play for Ginger and then Mary Ann and they run away. It's almost time for Duke to leave, but attraction to Ginger and Mary Ann keeps him wanting to stay there. The men come up with an idea. Ginger pretends to be in a relationship with the Professor. Mary Ann pretends to be in a relationship with Gilligan. Duke decides to leave. The radio reports that unfortunately, when Duke returned to Hawaii, he hit his head on a rock and developed amnesia.
| 22 | 22 | "Diamonds Are an Ape's Best Friend" | Jack Arnold | Elroy Schwartz | February 27, 1965 | 1625–0725 | 14.99 |
It's night time and Gilligan sees a gorilla in the window of their hut. The gorilla then goes to the Howells’ hut and steals Lovey's diamond brooch. The next morning, Gilligan sees the gorilla again. Skipper doesn't believe Gilligan. When Howell mentions the missing brooch, the others think he's implying that one of them took it. Mr. Howell offers a reward to the other castaways for finding the brooch. They spend the day looking with no success. That night everyone witnesses the gorilla make off with Lovey. While Professor is building a trap, Gilligan suggests the gorilla may be in the caves. The men find Lovey and the gorilla by the cave and she says the gorilla has her brooch. Ginger tries to distract the gorilla so the men can drop a net over him, but it doesn't work. Gilligan drops the net over Skipper and Professor. It's the Professor who hits on the solution, that the attraction is not for Mrs. Howell but for her perfume. While retrieving some more perfume, Gilligan spills it on himself. The gorilla makes off with Gilligan. Gilligan gets free when the gorilla finds a mate. Janos Prohaska as Ape (uncredited) and Stockard Channing as girl gorilla (uncredited).
| 23 | 23 | "How to Be a Hero" | Tony Leader | Herbert Finn & Alan Dinehart | March 6, 1965 | 1625–0724 | 13.57 |
A headhunter rows his tiny boat to the island. While Gilligan is trying to rescue Mary Ann from drowning, he starts to drown as well. Skipper recues both of them. The headhunter sees this. The Howells make a big deal out of Skipper being a hero and take several pictures. Gilligan becomes jealous of the Skipper and feels left out. Lovey talks to Gilligan and then tells Skipper that Gilligan is envious of him. Skipper devises a way to try to make him feel like a hero, but Gilligan bungles it up and Professor has to help the two of them. Gilligan sees the headhunter. Gilligan tries to tell Lovey what he saw and she gives him a sedative. Later, Lovey tries a stunt to make Gilligan a hero, but he messes that up as well. Gilligan mentions the headhunter again and the others think he just imagined it. Skipper comes up with a plan to dress as a headhunter, capture the others and have Gilligan rescue them. Gilligan overhears the plan. The real Headhunter captures the others and ties them to stakes. Gilligan comes by and thinks it's part of the plan. The headhunter arrives and Gilligan thinks it's Skipper. Skipper shows up and Gilligan realizes the other one is real. Gilligan finds a way to make the Headhunter leave the island.
| 24 | 24 | "The Return of Wrongway Feldman" | Gene Nelson | Lawrence J. Cohen & Fred Freeman | March 13, 1965 | 1625–0723 | 13.62 |
Wrongway Feldman (Hans Conried in his second of two guest appearances) returns to the island. All the castaways ask about a rescue. Wrongway says there won't be one. He returned to live on the island again and escape the hustle and bustle of the modern world. All the stories of what's going on back home makes the castaways even sadder. They pretend Gilligan is sick to get Wrongway to go to Hawaii to get a doctor. They find a note saying that Wrongway went to get help. Wrongway returns with just some serum and nothing else. They devise a plan to bring as much noisy civilization to the island as they can to make Wrongway want to go back. They also make Wrongway do a lot of work. He leaves the island and days later a message from him arrives in a bottle. Instead of going to Hawaii and rescuing the castaways, he lands on another uncharted island. He is pampered by native women and he decides to stay there.
| 25 | 25 | "The Matchmaker" | Tony Leader | Joanna Lee | March 20, 1965 | 1625–0727 | 14.78 |
Mrs. Howell is sad that she's missing the social season and weddings back home. Lovey wants to play matchmaker to Gilligan and Mary Ann after seeing Gilligan carrying her to camp after she was injured. She'll work on Mary Ann and she wants Thurston to work on Gilligan. The matchmaking progresses and Mary Ann believes that Gilligan likes her. But somehow, Gilligan believes Ginger has a crush on him. The Howells have Gilligan and Mary Ann over to their hut. Things get awkward when the Howells get into an argument. Howell moves in with Gilligan and Skipper. Lovey moves in with Ginger and Mary Ann. This leads to some of the others getting into fights. The Skipper wants to stop things from going even further. They recreate a romantic restaurant that the Howells went to. Ginger sings a sweet song. Skipper is the chef and Gilligan is the waiter. Ginger does a hula dance. The plan works and the Howells get back together. The next day, Lovey wants to match Professor with Ginger.
| 26 | 26 | "Music Hath Charms" | Jack Arnold | Al Schwartz & Howard Harris | March 27, 1965 | 1625–0726 | 13.83 |
Mrs. Howell sees Gilligan banging on a drum. Lovey wants to civilize the island with an orchestra. But Gilligan's drumbeats are mistaken by a tribe on another island as a declaration of war. The natives sail off for the castaways island. Meanwhile, Thurston is not that excited about an orchestra until Lovey suggests he be the conductor. Skipper tells Gilligan that he wants to be the conductor. The Professor will be on a bamboo flute, Ginger on a bamboo xylophone, and Mary Ann working a saw with a bow. Howell and Skipper have an argument over who will conduct. In the end, Skipper blows into cone shells and Mr. Howell is on the triangle. Lovey conducts and they start rehearsals. The natives surround and land on the island. A native scout finds the castaways playing and Professor tries to communicate with him. The castaways soon realize that the natives are everywhere and they hide in a cave. All seems lost after each of the male castaways gets captured due to Gilligan's ineptitude. Gilligan and the girls go looking for the other men. They find the natives dancing to the men playing their instruments. The natives leave the island. Gilligan plays his drums and natives on another island hear it.
| 27 | 27 | "New Neighbor Sam" | Thomas Montgomery | Charles Tannen & George O'Hanlon | April 3, 1965 | 1625–0729 | 15.41 |
Skipper and Gilligan are gathering firewood and they hear what sounds like two gangsters talking. Professor hopes to find the gangsters boat and use it to leave the island. The men try to find where the gangsters have camped. Howell and Professor think they've found the gangsters but it turns out to be Gilligan and Skipper. They come to a cave and hear the gangsters inside. The castaways come up with a plan to make it look as though they have a lot of armed men by making dummies and dressing them up. They discover the voices are coming from a parrot and they name it Sam. After the castaways capture the parrot, they believe he was owned by the gangsters. They hope to get information from the bird about the gangsters boat. The parrot squawks wildly when he hears the words "boat" and "jewelry". The mention of possible jewelry gets Mr. Howell's greed worked up. When he tries to learn the location of possible jewelry, the parrot eats one of Mrs. Howell's diamonds. Howell does get his diamond back and the men follow the parrot into the cave. But instead of finding jewelry, they find a box of crackers that the parrot wants. Note: Mel Blanc and Herb Vigran do the gangster voices of the parrot.
| 28 | 28 | "They're Off and Running" | Jack Arnold | Walter Black | April 10, 1965 | 1625–0728 | 13.52 |
Skipper has been constantly losing to Mr. Howell in turtle races. When his turtle is attracted to a carrot, Skipper now thinks he has a sure-fire way to win. Howell has Ginger find out from Gilligan what Skipper's secret is. Howell makes sure Skipper can't get another carrot. Gilligan is forced to become the Howells' man-servant when the Skipper loses the bet to Mr. Howell in the next turtle race. A lonely Skipper no longer has anyone to yell at. Gilligan has an idea. He asks Mr. Howell that, considering all he has, he could maybe lose a race and let the Skipper win Gilligan back. After Ginger reads Skipper's horoscope, he's more confident than ever that he'll win the next race. Without knowing what the other did, both Howells and then Gilligan end up switching the turtles. The result being that Howells’ champion comes out on top yet again. Mr. Howell finds a reason to let the Skipper have Gilligan back.
| 29 | 29 | "Three to Get Ready" | Jack Arnold | David P. Harmon | April 17, 1965 | 1625–0731 | 13.26 |
The Skipper believes that Gilligan found a lucky stone, "The Eye of the Idol", that entitles him to three wishes before the end of the day. However, the Professor believes it is just a silly superstition. Gilligan wishes for a gallon of ice cream, which miraculously washes up in the lagoon. Professor still doesn't believe in the stone. Skipper tells Gilligan that the third wish should be to get them off the island. He also says that the second wish should be something they all could enjoy. Gilligan can't decide what to wish for. Howell manages to get the stone away from Gilligan. He makes several wishes, but nothing happens. Howell gives Gilligan the stone back. While talking to Skipper and Howell, Gilligan makes a spontaneous wish for another gallon of ice cream which also comes true. Professor still doesn't believe in the stone. Gilligan loses the lucky stone before wish number three. Everyone sets out to look for it. Ginger finally finds the stone. Everyone is on the beach and Gilligan realizes he's lost the stone again. It's found and Professor says he's not going because he doesn't believe in it. They talk Professor into it. Gilligan wishes they were off the island. The land the castaways are standing on floats into the lagoon, making them "off the island".
| 30 | 30 | "Forget Me Not" | Jack Arnold | Herbert Margolis | April 24, 1965 | 1625–0730 | N/A |
Skipper and Gilligan are building a signal tower in hopes of notifying the passing Navy. Gilligan accidentally knocks Skipper out cold. When he comes to, Skipper has amnesia. Gilligan brings him to the Professor. Before anything can be done, Skipper makes advances toward Ginger. Professor lets everyone else know that Skipper has amnesia. That night Howell wants to hit Skipper on the head with a coconut in hopes of getting him to regain his memory. Because they switched hammocks, Howell hits Gilligan by mistake. Lovey goes to try and also hits Gilligan. The Professor resorts to hypnosis to cure him. The first attempt regresses him all the way to childhood. A second try puts the Skipper back fighting in WW2. He winds up believing that the other castaways are Japanese soldiers and runs away. The radio states that the Navy will be sailing by soon. Still thinking they're Japanese, Skipper gets a rifle and captures the others. A third attempt at hypnosis and the Professor winds up having Gilligan and Howell think they each are the Skipper. As Gilligan was the cause of the Skippers amnesia, he is also the cure. They missed the Navy ships and after a fall, Gilligan gets amnesia.
| 31 | 31 | "Diogenes, Won't You Please Go Home?" "Diogenes, Please Go Home" | Christian Nyby | David P. Harmon | May 1, 1965 | 1625–0709 | N/A |
Skipper knows Gilligan's been hiding something on the island, but he isn't able to find out what it is. Everyone starts to wonder as well. Gilligan finally tells Professor that it's a diary. Everyone wants to know what he wrote about them. Not wishing to have anyone reading about his innermost thoughts, Gilligan tosses his diary into the lagoon. The castaways are now mad at Gilligan. Gilligan brings up to Skipper how he freed them all when the Japanese sailor (Vito Scotti in his second of four guest appearances) came to the island, (in a style reminiscent of the Akira Kurosawa film Rashomon). This inspires Skipper, Howell and Ginger to write diaries of their own. They have different memories of the day the Japanese sailor arrived with each of them saving Gilligan. Mary Ann finds the missing diary and it reveals that Gilligan wrote only nice things about his fellow castaways.
| 32 | 32 | "Physical Fatness" | Gary Nelson | Herbert Finn & Alan Dinehart | May 8, 1965 | 1625–0732 | N/A |
The Professor makes a phosphorescent dye marker to help get rescued. Skipper and Gilligan decide to go back into the Navy after they're rescued. Word spreads that they may be rescued soon. According to the Navy manual, Skipper needs to lose weight. Professor says he'll be finished with his project in a week's time. Gilligan and Skipper need to build a raft for the dye. That night, Skipper tries to sneak some food and Gilligan catches him each time. Ginger teaches Skipper some exercises. While looking at the manual again, Skipper realizes that Gilligan needs to gain weight. Skipper is starving and Gilligan is non-stop eating. Professor plans to launch the raft with the dye that night. While being force fed, Gilligan accidentally eats the dye marker.
| 33 | 33 | "It's Magic" | Jack Arnold | Al Schwartz & Bruce Howard | May 15, 1965 | 1625–0733 | N/A |
While fishing, Gilligan and Skipper reel in a magician's chest from the lagoon. Professor says it might help the castaways convince any head hunters that they have magic powers. As Ginger started out in show business as a magician's assistant, she can teach the others. Everyone practices doing some tricks, but Gilligan doesn't do so well. Gilligan overhears that everybody is fed up with his unsuccessful attempts at magic. He is called "Annoying", "Pest", and "Impossible". Hurt by what everyone including Mary Ann said, he decides to run away. Skipper finds him in a one room cave, but Gilligan says he's not going back. They separately try to make things right with him, but it doesn't work. Ginger suggests throwing a party for him. To get him out of the cave, the men put on monster masks to scare him out. Gilligan runs back to camp and gets some flash powder to scare the monsters with. But Gilligan manages to switch the powder with flour that was going in the cake the girls were baking. Gilligan finds out the monster are the guys. When Gilligan blows out the candles on the cake, it blows up. Note: this is the second time Gilligan runs away.
| 34 | 34 | "Goodbye, Old Paint" | Jack Arnold | David P. Harmon | May 22, 1965 | 1625–0734 | N/A |
Alexandre Gregor Dubov (Harold J. Stone), a reclusive, snobbish painter, is found on the island. He does not make a good impression when he orders everyone around. Dubov tells Professor and Gilligan he brought with him a transmitter, but won't let anyone use it. He claims to have been on the island for ten years and wants to stay there because he doesn't believe his work is good enough yet. Mr. Howell suggests they get Dubov to paint Ginger. When they all rant and rave about it, he'll want to go home. The painting is done and it's a hideous abstract. Despite that, they praise his work and Dubov says he'll send for a boat. But then Gilligan lets it slip that Mr. Howell’s plan worked. Dubov is mad. Howell comes up with another plan. To convince Dubov to return to civilization, they set up Gilligan as a rival avant-garde artist. Dubov agrees to give up his transmitter if Gilligan gives him painting lessons. The transmitter is rusted and falling apart. Inside is a note that says Dubov tied his paintings together and floated to another island.
| 35 | 35 | "My Fair Gilligan" | Tony Leader | Joanna Lee | June 5, 1965 | 1625–0735 | N/A |
Gilligan saves Mrs. Howell's life by pushing her away from a large falling rock. The Howells decide to adopt him and change his name to "Gilligan Thurston Howell IV". The Howells inform the others of their decision and says Gilligan is their legal heir. Thurston now isn't too sure he did the right thing. Gilligan moves into the Howells' hut. Thurston tries to teach Gilligan about the finer things and make him into a cultured Howell. The others start to treat Gilligan differently and won't let him help with their menial work. Thurston tells Gilligan he is giving him a coming out party. Gilligan misses his simpler lifestyle with the others. Gilligan has a nightmare where he is a king. The others all want something from the king and all he wants to do is go butterfly hunting. He decides to cut off their heads, but then changes his mind saying he doesn't want to be king. Later, Gilligan decides he wants to just be himself, but he doesn't want to hurt the Howells’ feelings. The other castaways come up with a plan to help Gilligan. It's the night of the party and the others make Gilligan look like a cheat and a cad. Howell doesn't tell the others, but he knows Gilligan was just acting and lets him be Gilligan again.
| 36 | 36 | "A Nose by Any Other Name" | Hal Cooper | Elroy Schwartz | June 12, 1965 | 1625–0736 | N/A |
Gilligan's nose swells and his ego fades after he falls out of a coconut tree. As this is the first real accident they've had, Professor thinks they should get prepared for emergencies. The Professor is going to give everyone first aid lessons. But things don't go well as the girls wind up giving Howell, Professor and Skipper sprained arms. Gilligan believes his nose is broken and wants the Professor to operate on it. Professor maintains it's just swollen. Mrs. Howell tries to cheer Gilligan up by telling him he looks much better this way. Ginger and Mary Ann do the same thing. Gilligan overhears the girls talking about their plan and he feels even worse. Gilligan insists that Professor perform surgery on his deformed nose and he agrees. Skipper tells Gilligan he'll now be able to have any kind of nose he wants. Skipper makes a clay cast of Gilligan's head. While looking for Skipper, Gilligan scares the girls with his clay cast on his head. It's time for Gilligan's operation. Days later, Professor removes the bandage and Gilligan's nose is back to normal. They tell Gilligan they didn't operate, they just waited for the swelling to go down. Skipper accidentally hits Professor in the nose with a golf club and it swells up. Note: This is the last episode with the words "And The Rest" and the last episode where Russell Johnson and Dawn Wells are only in the end credits. Starting in the next season and the rest of the series, they are in the intro. Also the last black and white episode.
