= Joseph Csatari =

American painter (1929–2025)

- Born: February 20, 1929; South River, New Jersey, U.S.
- Died: April 14, 2025 (aged 96); Bethlehem, Pennsylvania, U.S.
- Education: Academy of Arts, Newark, New Jersey; Pratt Institute
- Movement: Realism
- Awards: Silver Beaver and Silver Buffalo Awards

Joseph Csatari (February 20, 1929 – April 14, 2025) was an American artist, born in South River, New Jersey, the son of John and Emma (née Kovacs) Csatari, who were Hungarian immigrants. Csatari was a realist artist who worked with Norman Rockwell. As a boy, Csatari had painstakingly recreated Saturday Evening Post covers that Rockwell had painted. In 1977, shortly before Rockwell died, Csatari was commissioned as the Boy Scouts of America's (BSA) official artist.

== Early life and career ==
Csatari studied art at the Academy of Arts, Newark, New Jersey and also at the Pratt Institute in Brooklyn. In 1953, he became an artist in the layout division in BSA Supply Division's advertising department. In 1958, he became the art director; designing advertising and sales promotional pieces, cover illustrations, and posters. Like his mentor Rockwell, he also served as art director of Boys' Life magazine at the beginning of his career, being named to that position in 1973. This was the time he worked closely with Rockwell. Csatari's job was to come up with possible themes for the paintings and make rough sketches for Rockwell. Once Rockwell decided on a concept, Csatari would gather models and shuttle them up for a photo shoot in the artist's studio in Stockbridge, Massachusetts. Csatari often assisted Rockwell on his work at this time as by then Rockwell was aging. In 1976 when Rockwell retired from the calendar commission, the BSA asked Csatari to continue in the Rockwell tradition. Csatari said that while he painted in Rockwell's style, he was no Rockwell, whom he considered in another league.

Since the 1977 BSA calendar, Csatari made 24 paintings for the Boy Scouts of America, including a painting commemorating the endowment program's 1910 Society. In 1997 an exhibit of these paintings toured the United States at fund-raising events in local councils throughout the country. Though it's not well known, Csatari also painted more than 10 official portraits of BSA presidents and Chief Scout Executives during his career. But it is his paintings of "Boy Scouts being Boy Scouts, having fun in the outdoors, and doing community service projects" that he found most rewarding.

Csatari became a freelance artist in 1977 and painted for many magazines and companies, as well as having painted designs for two U.S. postage stamps and several book covers. He lived in South River, New Jersey, where he maintained an art studio at his home, and had a wife and three children. He received several awards of excellence in Editorial Art Directing from the Society of Illustrators, New York.

In early June 2005, Csatari was awarded the BSA's highest honor, the Silver Buffalo Award. In 2008, a twelve-city U.S. tour of Norman Rockwell's and Csatari's artworks was scheduled.

== Critique of his work ==
Being an eager and willing disciple of Rockwell, Csatari is often viewed in the same manner, an illustrator, not an artist, who painted in overly sentimental tones when depicting people and Americana. Csatari did not mind these comparisons and critiques, nor did Rockwell.

== Death ==
On April 14, 2025, Csatari died at Traditions of Hanover in Bethlehem, Pennsylvania, a seniors retirement community. He was 96.

== Footnotes ==
1. Zimmer, William (January 13, 2002). "New York Times, January 13, 2002". The New York Times.
2. "Csatari's official site". Csatari Artwork.
3. "Joseph Csatari". Rockwell and Csatari: Boy Scout Calendar Artists. Archived from the original on February 7, 2006.
4. "Artist has another brush with fame" by John Dunphy, Sentinel, June 9, 2005, retrieved January 30, 2006
5. "Rockwell and Csatari: A tour de force". Scouting Magazine: 6. March–April 2008.
