= National Scouting Museum =

Official museum of the Scouting America

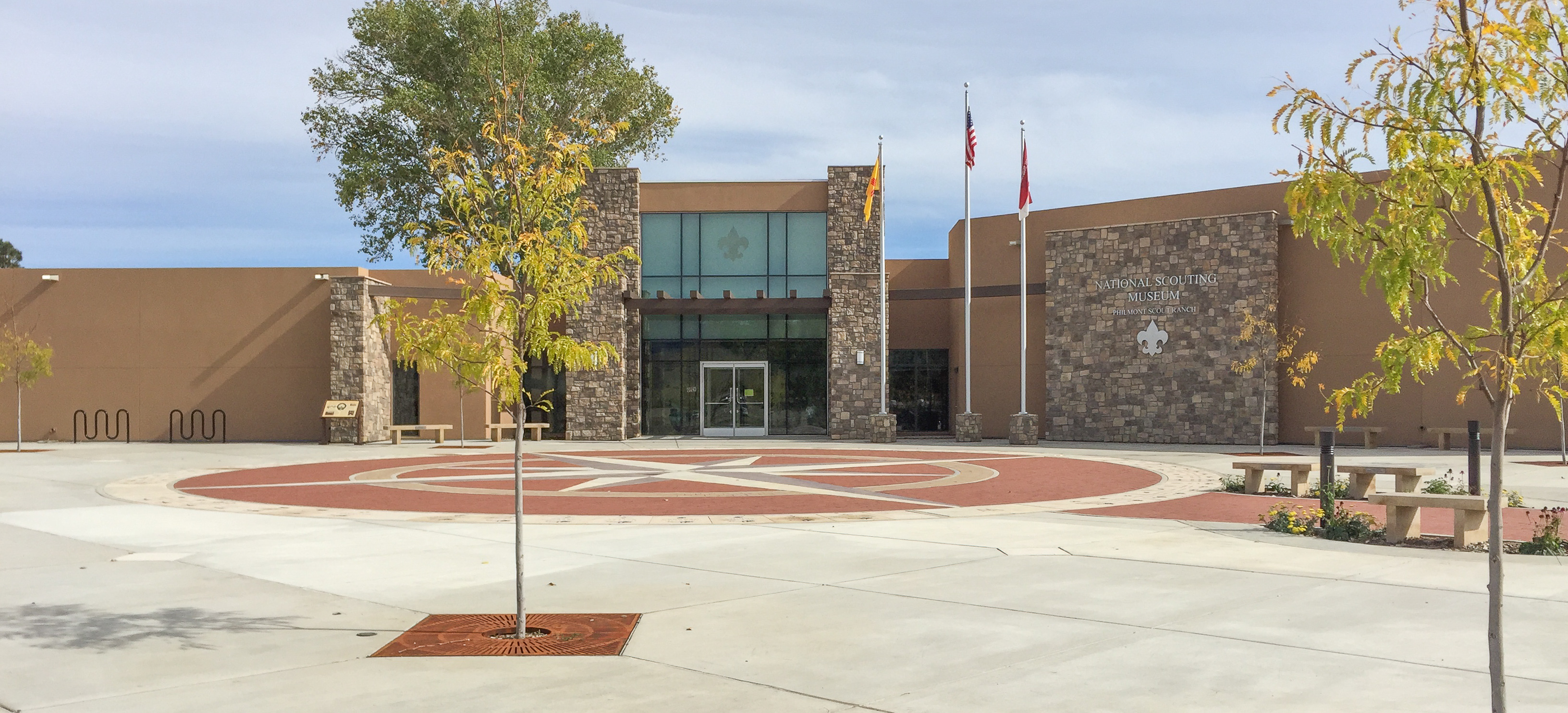
- Location: 17 Deer Run Road; Cimarron, New Mexico
- Coordinates: 36.4553°N 104.9557°W
- Founded: 1959
- Website; National Scouting Museum

The National Scouting Museum is the official museum of Scouting America.

== Background ==
The museum was first opened in 1959 in North Brunswick, New Jersey, as the Johnston Memorial Museum. With the relocation of the Boy Scouts of America national headquarters from New Jersey to Texas, the museum closed in 1979.

In 1986 the museum reopened on the campus of Murray State University in western Kentucky. Museum officials had predicted that 120,000 people annually would visit the Kentucky location, but by the late 1990s yearly attendance was under 20,000.

In October 2002 the museum moved to Irving, Texas, across the road from the national headquarters. The Irving museum closed in preparation for its move to Philmont on September 4, 2017.

On May 29, 2018 the museum reopened at Philmont Scout Ranch in Cimarron, New Mexico, with a grand opening on September 15, 2018.

== Exhibits ==
The National Scouting Museum contains five galleries.

The Smart Family Foundation Scouting Heritage Gallery is organized around the Aims and Methods of Scouting. The gallery focuses on the history of Scouting America, including displays that feature Advancement, including the first Eagle Scout award, Uniforming, Adult Association, and the Patrol Method. Additional exhibits feature Cub Scouts, Scouting with Disabilities, Honor Medals, International Scouting, National and World Jamborees, and more. The Founders' Corner recognizes BSA Founders Robert Baden-Powell, Ernest Thompson Seton, Daniel Carter Beard, William D. Boyce, and James E. West. There is also a dedicated exhibit to William "Green Bar Bill" Hillcourt.

The Ingram Order of the Arrow gallery is dedicated to the history of the Order of the Arrow.

The Philmont Gallery focuses on the history of Philmont Scout Ranch, the Philmont Training Center and the Philmont Staff Association. It includes a #D Topographical map of the ranch.

The Santa Fe Trail gallery, includes displays that feature the history of Northeast New Mexico, Colfax County and the Sante Fe Trail. Displays on mining, logging, railroads and an historic Santa Fe Trail stage wagon or available.

The Ernest Thompson Seton gallery features items from his Native American collection, natural history collection, and artwork by Ernest Thompson Seton.

The museum's main lobby features a small exhibit on NASA and Scouting and a display about Scouts in Antarctica, as well as artwork that includes a 1914 Boy Scout advertising billboard from Mt. Gilead, Ohio, a bronze plaque of the Scout Oath and Law, and a bronze statue titled The Ideal Scout by R. Tait McKenzie.

The museum is home to a collection of over 600,000 artifacts that tell the story of Scouting America, Philmont Scout Ranch, and the Southwest Region.

== Seton Memorial Library ==
Housed within the National Scouting Museum, the Seton Memorial Library contains the library of Ernest Thompson Seton, one of the founders of the Boy Scouts of America. This research library contains Seton's personal collection and an extensive collection of volumes pertaining to western lore and the history of the area. In addition to the book collection itself, the library also features a large reading room, visiting scholar research room, and archive.

The National Scouting Museum also holds Seton's art, anthropology, and natural history collections that were donated by Julia Seton to the former Philmont Museum (also known as the Seton Museum) in 1967 before its merger with the National Scouting Museum in 2018. Many items from the Seton Collections can be seen on display in the library and in Seton Gallery.

== Other facilities ==
The National Scouting Museum features the 88-person Carl & Janice Marchetti Order of the Arrow Conference Room, along with a large gift shop that sells books, artwork, Southwestern jewelry, and other mementos.

The National Scouting Museum is one of three museums administered by Philmont's Museum Department. The others include the Villa Philmonte and the Kit Carson Museum at Rayado, New Mexico.

== See also ==
- Girl Scout Museum and Archives
