= List of photographic equipment makers =

This list of photographic equipment makers lists companies that manufacture (or license manufacture from other companies) equipment for photography.

== Camera and lens manufacturers ==
Note that producers whose only presence in the photo industry at any time has been the manufacture of digital cameras (Logitech, for example, which has made Webcams) are listed separately on the List of digital camera brands.

There is not a very clear distinguishing line between camera producers and lens producers; many companies do both, or have done both at one time or another. Some camera manufacturers sell lenses made by others as their own, in an OEM arrangement. Some camera makers design lenses but outsource manufacture. Some lens makers have cameras made to sell under their own brand name. A few companies are only in the lens business. Some camera companies make no lenses, but usually at least sell a lens from some lens maker with their cameras as part of a package.

Note that many optical instruments such as microscopes, telescopes, spotting scopes and so forth can be used as photographic lenses; manufacturers of these types of equipment are not included here (unless they also make more conventional photo gear).

=== Manufacturers of cameras or lenses and filters ===
- ALPA
- Andor Technology
- Angenieux
- AXIOM (camera)
- Argus
- Arnold & Richter (see Arri)
- Arri
- Asahi (see Pentax)
- Bell & Howell Co.
- BelOMO
- Blackmagic Design
- Bolex
- Bron Elektronik
- B+W Filterfabrik (owned by Schneider Kreuznach).
- Cambo camera
- Canon
- Casio
- Century Precision Optics (owned by Schneider Kreuznach)
- Cokin
- Cooke
- Cosina
- Exakta
- Folmer and Schwing
- Fujifilm
- Fujinon (see Fujifilm)
- Gowland
- Hanimex
- Hartblei
- Hasselblad
- Holga
- Ikegami
- Ilford
- IMAX
- Kiev-Arsenal
- Kino Precision (makers of Kiron and Vivitar Series 1 lenses)
- Kenko (part of KenkoTokina Corporation)
- Kodak
- Kowa
- Krasnogorsky Mekanicheski Zavod (also known as KMZ, makers of Zorki, Zenit, Horizon cameras, Zenitar lenses)
- Laowa see Venus Optics
- Leica
- Lensbaby
- Linhof
- Littmann
- LOMO (Leningradskoye Optiko Mechanichesckoye Obyedinenie)
- Lytro (makers of consumer plenoptic cameras)
- Mamiya (part of Phase One)
- MegaVision
- Meyer Optik Görlitz
- Minolta
- Minox
- Miranda Camera Company
- Nikon
- Noblex
- Olympus
- Panasonic
- Panon (see Widelux)
- Pentax
- Phase One
- Plaubel
- Polaroid
- Profoto
- Ricoh
- Rodenstock
- Ross
- Samsung
- Samyang Optics (Samyang SLR lenses are also branded as Vivitar, Rokinon, Walimex, Bower or Pro-Optic.)
- Seagull Camera
- Schneider Kreuznach
- Sigma
- Silvestri
- Sinar
- Soligor
- Sony
- Steinheil
- Sunpak
- Tamron (Second shareholder is Sony)
- Taylor, Taylor and Hobson (now known as Cooke)
- Tiffen
- Tokina (part of KenkoTokina Corporation)
- Toyo
- Vageeswari
- Venus Optics (brand: Laowa)
- Vivitar
- Voigtländer (name used under license; original company defunct)
- Wratten see Tiffen (makes the products) and Kodak (owns the brand)
- Walz
- Yongnuo
- Zeiss
- Zenit see KMZ
- Zorki see KMZ
- Zuiko see Olympus

=== Former producers of film cameras who now make digital cameras ===
- Kyocera as of 2005, only cellphone cameras
- Polaroid
- Ricoh
- Sanyo

=== Former producers of cameras or lenses and filters ===
- ADOX
- Agfa
- Ansco
- Atoms (Calypso underwater camera)
- Beauty (formerly Taiyodo Koki)
- Bermpohl (Berlin)Adolf Miethe
- Carl Braun Camera-Werk
- Bronica
- Chinon Industries
- Contax
- Corfield Ltd (Early British camera maker, created the Corfield Periflex)
- Coronet Camera Company
- Otto Berning Gmbh. (Made the Robot)
- Bell & Howell
- Chinon
- David White Company (Stereo Realist)
- DHW Fototechnik (see Rollei)
- Ducati
- FED
- Ferrania
- Franka Kamerawerk
- Graflex
- Honeywell
- Ihagee
- Ilford (still produces film and chemicals)
- J. Lancaster & Son
- Keystone (126 and 110 cameras with built-in flash, movie cameras)
- Kiron Lenses
- Konica
- Konishiroku (see Konica Minolta)
- Konica Minolta (as of 2006 may still manufacture on an OEM basis for Sony)
- Leitz (formerly owned Leica)
- Leidolf
- Lord see Okaya
- Meopta (still produces many optical products)
- Minolta
- Micro Precision Products
- Miranda
- MPP (see Micro Precision Products)
- Nicca
- Nimslo (4 lens 35 mm 3D camera)
- Norita
- Okaya
- OPL
- Orion see Miranda
- Pentacon (Praktica)
- PerkinElmer
- Petri Founded 1907 as 'Kuribayashi Camera Works'
- Plaubel
- Rectaflex
- Rollei
- Robot See Otto Berning
- Steinheil
- Taiyodo Koki (which became the Beauty Camera Company)
- Tessina
- Thornton-Pickard
- Topcon (still manufactures optical instruments)
- Tokyo Optical see Topcon
- Tower (a house brand of Sears)
- VE-JA-DE Products, owned and founded by Vincent Joseph Dunker
- Vivitar
- Wollensak
- Wray
- Yashica
- Zeiss_Ikon
- Zenza see Bronica

== List of camera accessory makers ==
- Adorama
- Blackmagic Design
- Beseler
- Bowens
- Cactus
- Crumpler
- Domke
- Gary Fong
- Foba
- Gitzo
- Hama
- Hoya
- Leaf
- Lee Filters
- LPA Design
- Manfrotto
- Meopta
- Metz
- Micro Precision Products
- MPP (see Micro Precision Products)
- Panasonic
- Polaroid
- Profoto
- Sigma
- SLIK
- Sun Ray Photo Company
- Sunpak
- Tiffen
- Triggertrap
- Velbon
- Vivitar
- Yongnuo

== List of photographic film, paper & chemistry brands and manufacturers ==
Note films, paper and chemicals may be sold by a manufacturer who has produced the product under their own brand or alternatively under a brand name owned by one party, with manufacture and packaging of the product outsourced to third parties as well as many permutations of these options. Therefore, this list includes both brands and manufacturers with information (where known) on their current capability.

=== Current ===
- ADOX (Germany) Brand of B&W & Colour films, papers and chemistry. (Film 3rd party commissioned and Agfa-gevaert material) Film conversion capability. Resurrecting an Agfa Coater and access to former Ilford Imaging (Marly, Switzerland) coater.
- Agfa-Gevaert (Belgium) Manufacturer of B&W Aerofilms & Microfilms. Business to business.
- AgfaPhoto Holdings GMBH (Germany) Brand of B&W films. (Manufacture by Harman Technology)
- Bergger (France) Brand of B&W film (Manufacture by Inoviscoat)
- Calbe Chemie (Germany) Manufacture of photographic chemicals (formerly part of Agfa Wolfen/ORWO)
- Carestream (USA) Manufacture of Kodak RA4 papers. (Formerly part of Kodak).
- Champion (Malaysia) Manufacture of photographic chemicals
- Compard (Germany) Manufacture/packing of photographic chemicals (ex Agfa products formerly supplied by Agfa chemical plant in Vaihingen-Enzs closed 2015)
- Cinestill (USA) Converting/packing Kodak Motion Picture film without Remjet layer.
- FILM Ferrania (Italy) Small scale manufacturer of B&W film
- Film Washi (France) Handcrafted B&W film.
- Foma Bohemia (Czech Republic) Manufacture of B&W films, X-Ray and Industrial films & contract manufacture. B&W photographic chemicals and papers
- Fotospeed (UK) Brand of photographic chemicals and papers
- Fujifilm (Japan) Manufacture of Black and white and color film, instant film, Microfilms & RA4 paper. Fuji Hunt subsidiary producing color photographic chemicals.
- Harman Technology (UK) Manufacturer of B&W films & photographic papers under ILFORD and Kentmere Brands. Also contract manufacture. B&W chemicals (produced by Tetenal)
- Inoviscoat (Germany) Manufactures film components for other brands, including Impossible Project, ADOX) Business to business, now part of ORWO.
- Island Polymer Industries, Triacetate Cellulose (TAC) film production using former ORWO Wolfen facility, largest cast film manufacturer in Europe.
- Kentmere (UK) Brand of B&W film and papers – see Harman Technology
- Kodak (USA) Manufacture of B&W & Color film including Cine films.
- Kodak Alaris (UK) Distribution and marketing of Kodak still products and B&W Photographic chemicals. (RA4 Paper and color chemicals business sold to Sinopromise in 2020).
- Kono! (Austria) B&W and 'Creative' pre exposed color films.(using 3rd party stock)
- Lomography (Austria) Brand. B&W & Color films. (Manufacture by Kodak (Color negative) & Foma (B&W) & Inoviscoat (special colors/Kino films)
- Lucky Film (China) Manufacture of B&W & Color films. Ceased photographic film production in 2012 (Color) 2018 (B&W). In March 2024, China Lucky Film announced the resumption of B&W film production.
- Moersch (Germany) Photographic chemicals
- Oriental (Japan) Brand. B&W film (Manufacture by Harman Technology)
- ORWO (Germany) Brand of Filmotec. B&W cinefilms. Now merged with Inoviscoat under ORWO brand.
- Polaroid B.V. (Netherlands) (was Impossible Project, then Polaroid Originals) Manufacturer of B&W and color instant film.
- Rera (Japan) Conversion of B&W and color reversal film for 127 cameras (using 3rd party stock)
- Revelog (Austria) Creative (pre-exposed) color films. (using 3rd party stock)
- Rollei (Germany) Brand of Maco Photo Products B&W and Color film. (Manufactured by Agfa-Gevaert and Harman Technology). B&W/Color photographic chemicals
- Shanghai (China) Manufacturer of B&W film, re-packaged ORWO cinefilms
- Silberra (Russia) Brand of B&W films (Converting/packing Agfa-Gevaert B&W aerofilms)
- Sinopromise (China) Kodak Flexicolor Chemistry and conversion/packing of Kodak RA4 paper. (Coated by Carestream)
- Slavich (Russia) Manufacturer of B&W photographic paper; Micron Division, photographic plates and films.
- SPUR (Germany) Manufacturer of photographic chemicals
- Svema (Ukraine) Brand of Astrum Holdings. Converting/packing 3rd party B&W & Color aerofilms
- Tasma (Russia) Manufacturer of Aerofilms. Business to business only.
- Tetenal (Germany) Manufacture/packing of photographic chemicals under own brand and for Ilford & Kodak. Receivership in 2018.
- Yodica (Italy) Creative (pre-exposed) color films. (using 3rd party stock)

=== Former ===
- AgfaPhoto GMBH (Leverkusen, Germany) Major producer of B&W and color negative and reversal films, papers and chemicals. Spun off from Agfa-Gevaert in 2004. Production ended 2005. Now a brand under Agfaphoto Holdings GMBH.
- Efke (Yugoslavia/Croatia) Manufacture of B&W films (the old ADOX formulas) and IR film. Closed 2012.
- ERA (China) Manufacture of B&W film. 80% holding acquired by Kodak China in 1998. Closed 2008.
- Faber (Germany) chemistry
- Ferrania (Italy) Major producer of B&W film, cine film, color negative and reversal white label films and own Solaris brand. Closed 2012, Formerly owned by 3M and spun out into Imation. Sold x-ray business to Kodak. See FILM Ferrania.
- Forte (Hungary) Manufacture of B&W film. Closed 2007
- Fuda (China) Manufacture of B&W and Color film. Closed
- Hauff AG (Germany) B&W film, paper
- Herzog (Bremen, Germany) Manufacture of B&W film, closed 1964
- Hindustan Photo Films (India)
- Ilford Imaging (Switzerland) Ilfochrome/Cibachrome. Sold in 2005, plant closed 2013. See ADOX.
- Ilford Imaging (UK) B&W film. Receivership 2004. Rescued in management buy out. See Harman Technology.
- Kentmere (UK) B&W Papers. Acquired by Harman Technology 2007. Plant in Kentmere, Cumbria closed.
- Konica (Japan) Major color film producer including white label brands, merged with Minolta, Closed film business in 2006.
- Kranseder (Munic, Germany)
- Leonar (Hamburg, Germany) Manufacture of B&W papers
- Mimosa (Dresden, Kiel, Germany) Manufacture of B&W papers & films
- Negra (Spain) Manufacture of B&W film. Closed 1984
- ORWO (Germany) (bankrupt 1995, Trademark sold to two different companies. Motion Picture stock now made by Filmotec, processing business sold to another firm.) See ORWO.
- Perutz-Photowerke (founded in 1880 by Otto Perutz, since 1964 owned by Agfa, closed down in 1994)
- Polaroid (USA) Bankrupt 2001 & 2008. See Polaroid B.V.
- Revue (a label owned by Foto-Quelle, a subsidiary of Quelle, known as Arcandor today; several sources claim that Revue films were actually repackaged stock leftover of other companies, first Fuji/3M, later Agfa)
- Svema (Ukraine) Major soviet manufacturer of B&W, Colour negative and reversal film. Ceased production of film in 2000. Now a brand owned by Astrum.
- Tura (Germany) Manufacture of B&W papers & films
- Valca (Spain), Manufacture of B&W & X-ray film, from 1940 to 1993.

== List of darkroom equipment manufacturers ==
=== Current ===
- AP Photo Industries (Spain) Darkroom equipment, film cartridges and cartridge loading equipment, disposable cameras
- Beseler (USA) Photographic enlargers
- De Vere (UK) Digital enlargers. Previous manufacturer of quality analog photographic enlargers.
- Dunco, Photographic enlargers
- Jobo (US) Film/Photo processors
- Fujifilm (Japan) Frontier minlabs
- Kaiser (Germany) Photographic enlargers and easels
- Kienzle (Germany) Photographic enlargers
- LPL (Japan) Photographic enlargers and easels
- Noritsu (Japan) dry/wet minlabs
- Nova darkroom (UK) Film/Photo process equipment
- Omega (USA) Photographic enlargers
- Paterson (UK) Photo processing equipment
- SDS (UK) Manufacture of RH Designs exposure meters

=== Former ===
- Agfa (Germany) Photographic enlargers, minilabs
- Durst (Italy) Photographic enlargers and related products, ceased production in 2007. Now produces inkjet printers
- Meopta (Czech Republic/US) Ceased Photographic enlarger production 2006.
- Leitz (Germany) Focomat photographic enlargers
- Konica Minolta (Japan) Minlabs, photographic enlargers, film scanners. Exited photo business in 2006.
- Phototherm (USA) Sidekick photo processors. Ceased production/support 2018.
- Photon Beard (UK) Easels. Main specialism lighting.

== List of semiconductor sensor makers or designers ==
Sensor types CCD, CMOS, NMOS, PMOS

- Canon
- Dalsa (formerly part of Philips)
- Foveon
- Fujifilm, designers of the Super CCD
- Matsushita
- Nikon (designs, but as of 2006 does not yet fabricate)
- Sony
- Samsung Digital Imaging, part of Samsung Corporation
- Toshiba
