= Field camera =

View camera that can be folded in a compact size

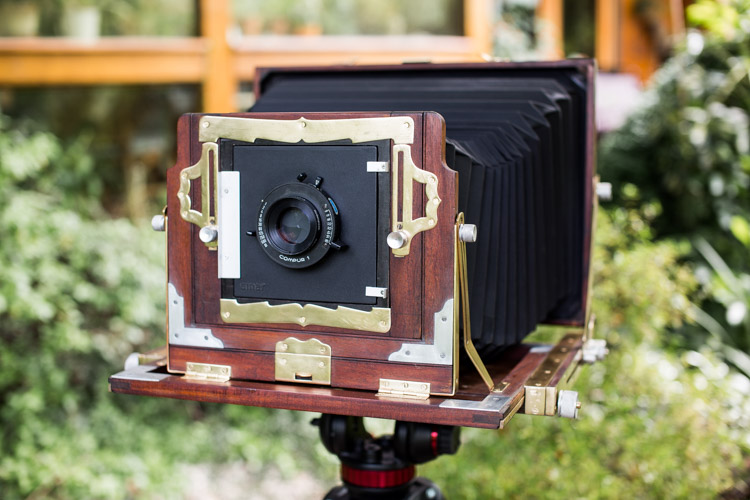
Vageeswari Foldable 8,5×15” Vageeswari Camera

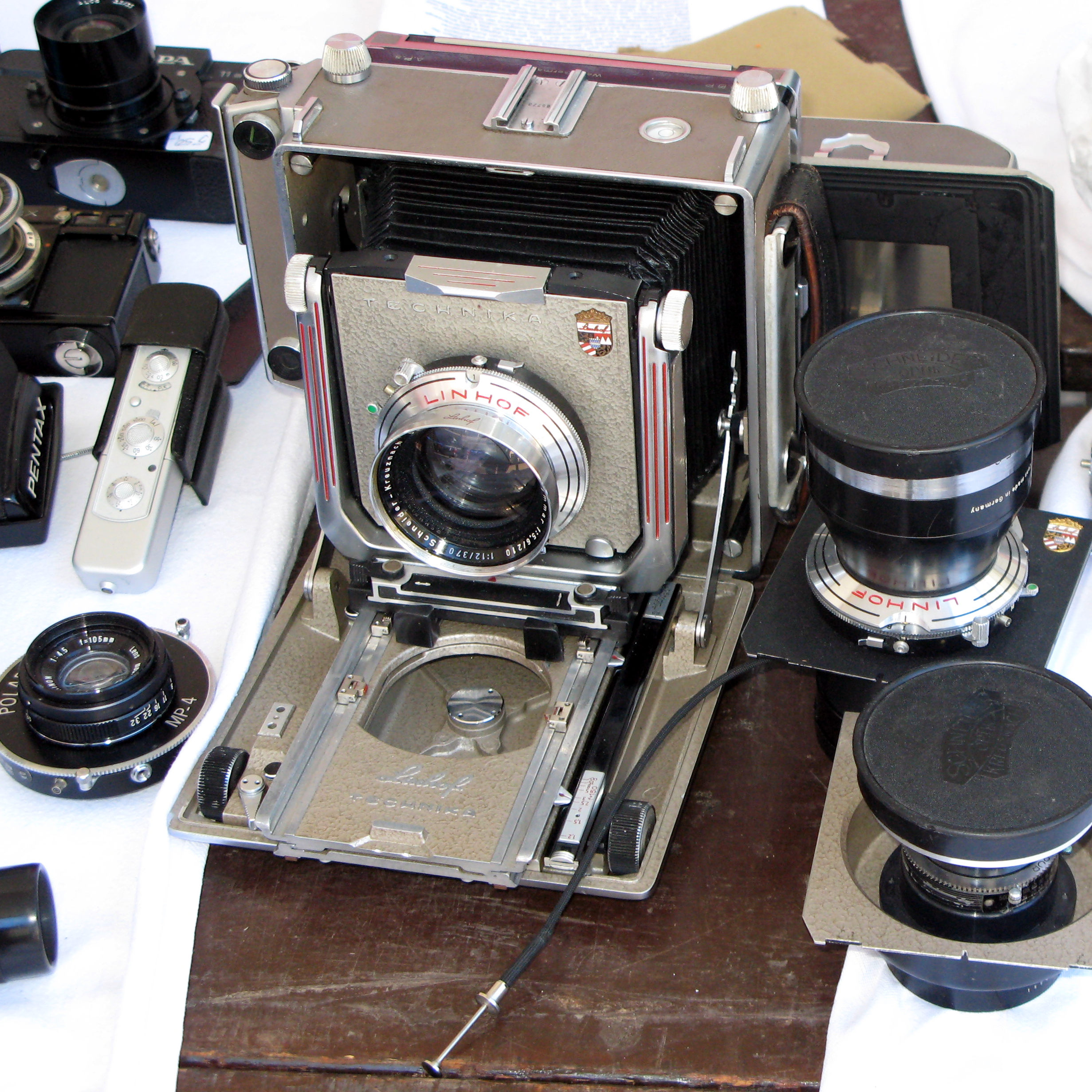
Linhof Technika IV Field camera

A field camera is a view camera that can be folded in a compact size. Modern designs are little different from the first folding field cameras from the 19th century. In general they have more limited camera movements than monorail cameras, but when folded are relatively compact and portable.

Modern field cameras originate from the early interlocking box cameras of the 19th century. Rather than the wooden box used in 19th-century cameras, modern models substitute bellows to reduce the bulk of the cameras and make them easier to use outside the studio.

Although they have less flexibility than monorail cameras, modern field cameras tend to have most camera movements for the front standard, i.e. lens rise/fall/shift/tilt/swing, but are usually more limited in back movements, sometimes having only tilt/swing.

They usually use sheet film, in sizes from 6x9cm (2.4×3.6") to 20×24 inches (e.g., the Polaroid 20×24 camera), but the most popular "standard" sizes are 4×5 and 8×10 inches. They are usually used by photographers who need the larger negative sizes and the portability.

== See also ==
- Silvestri
- Linhof
- Deardorff
- Vageeswari
