= Haje Jan Kamps =

Dutch entrepreneur and writer

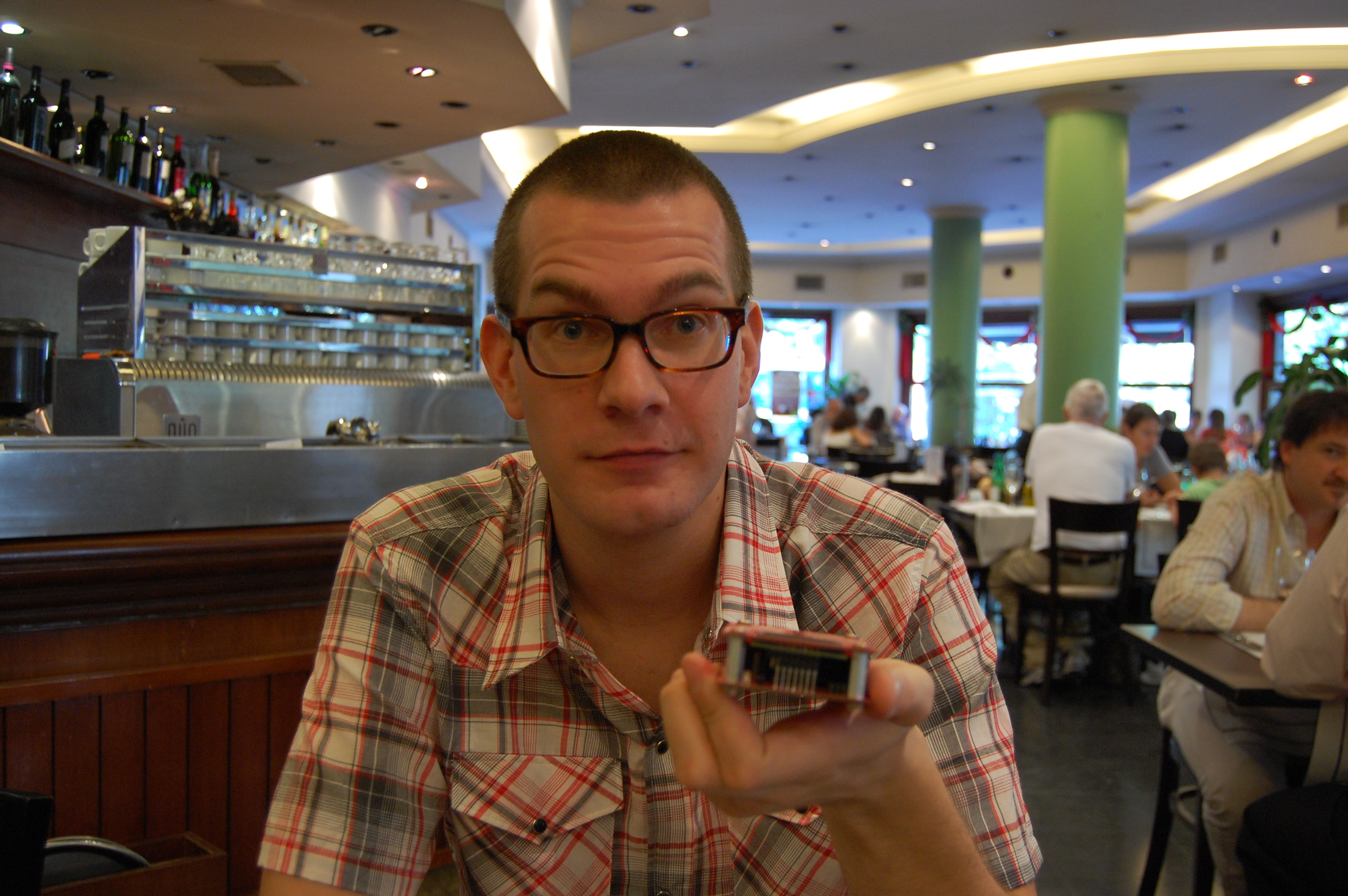
- Born: Leiderdorp, South Holland, Netherlands
- Citizenship: Dutch
- Education: Liverpool John Moores University
- Occupations: Photographer, businessman, journalist, author, blogger, freelance writer
- Organization(s): Triggertrap, TechCrunch, Lifefolder, Bolt VC, Konf, ScreenCloud, Photocritic photography school
- Notable work: The Rules of Photography (and when to break them), Shooting Yourself: Self-Portraits with Attitude!, Macro Photography Photo Workshop, Why Photographers Prefer Cloudy Days, Accelerated Startup
- Website: https://kamps.org/

Haje Jan Kamps is a Dutch photographer, author, awards photo judge, freelance writer, businessperson, journalist, inventor, and editor. Jan Kamps was the director of portfolio at Bolt VC, a hardware-focused pre-seed and seed-stage venture capital firm interested on hardware startups and enabling technologies. According to William A. Sahlman and Robert F. White of the Harvard Business School, experts on Entrepreneurial Management, Bolt VC resembled a new concept of seed venture capital firm built to serve the needs of early-stage startups at the intersection of hardware and software. Kamps has also been a staff writer for TechCrunch and is still a frequent contributor to the news site. His work on TechCrunch has been featured on Forbes. From 2011 to 2017, Kamps acted as the Founder CEO of Triggertrap. He is currently the CEO of Konf, a platform for small and medium-sized virtual conferences and events. On the blog of the company registered at Medium, an online publishing platform, Kamps himself stated that a permanent behavior change was expected because of the COVID-19 pandemic and that people were likely to rely more on virtual conferencing, which may have some positive effects on the environment. As an expert, he has been part of the panel of judges for the E! People's Choice Awards and the Oslo Innovation Award.

== Background ==
Born in South Holland, the Netherlands, Haje moved to Norway in 1988, and to the UK in 2001. In England, he studied Journalism at Liverpool John Moores University, and started a stint working in publishing, media and photography. In 2017, he co-launched Lifefolder, known for having launched Emily, a Messenger Facebook chatbot designed to help people with end of life planning in North Carolina. Using artificial intelligence, Lifefolder aimed to normalize talking about death and prepare for the logistics of dying. In December 2017, it was announced that the company was about to cease operations.

== Media career ==
In 1998, together with Martin Lexow Wirak, when Kamps was sixteen years old, he started Digitalkamera.no, a major Norwegian technology news website about digital photography which later evolved into akam.no.

In 2002, while working at Granada Television, on a Coronation Street specials series, Kamps started a website called Photocritic, which gained notoriety in December 2005, when it was featured on Slashdot, and subsequently got coverage on Digg. In 2011, it was cited by author Jeremy Butler in his book 'Television Style'.

The Photocritic.org website was later purchased by Sterling Publishing, and is now hosted at Pixiq, where Kamps posts regularly.

In 2007, Kamps wrote a book on macro photography for John Wiley & Sons publishing, entitled Macro Photography Photo Workshop (ISBN 978-0470118764). He has worked at Future Publishing as a web editor and for Fast Car Magazine and T3 magazine as well. He later started working as a senior producer at Five, the UK-based TV channel. At Five, Kamps was the senior producer of the FiveFWD website.

Since then, Kamps is known for working as a freelance ghostwriter and media editorial consultant. He has also acted as a guest in different photography competitions. In 2011, he created Triggertrap, which was his main occupation until 2017, when the company ceased operations.

== Product development ==
In 2011, Kamps created the Triggertrap universal camera trigger, a device based on the Arduino rapid prototyping platform. The Triggertrap was known for connecting cameras to various sources (light, laser, sound, or any other arbitrary source), and can be used to trigger the camera on a certain event. The Triggertrap project was crowd-funded via the Kickstarter platform in July 2011, raising $77,262 - more than 3 times over its original $25,000 goal.

In November 2013, the Triggertrap Ada was crowd-funded via Kickstarter, raising £290,386 though the original goal was £50,000. On 2 March 2015, Triggertrap announced that they had failed to bring the product into production and that only the remaining 20% of the funds from the Kickstarter campaign would be returned to the original backers.

== Awards ==
- 2008: Photocritic's can macro tube was awarded best DIY photography gadget on Lifehacker.

== Bibliography ==
=== Books ===
- Macro Photography Photo Workshop (ISBN 978-0470118764 / Published 2007)
- Focus on Photographing People (ISBN 978-0240814698 / Published 2011)
- Creative EVIL Photography (ISBN 978-1454703488 / Published 2012)
- The Rules of Photography (and when to break them) (ISBN 978-1908150585 / Published 2012)
- Focus on Travel Photography (ISBN 978-0240823911 / Published 2012)
- Shooting Yourself: Self-Portraits with Attitude! (ISBN 978-1781579947 / Published 2013) / Published as Selfies in 2014 with ISBN 978-1440334627
- The Ilex Introduction to Photography (ISBN 978-1781579862 / Published 2013)
- Confessions of a police constable (ISBN 9780007497454 / Published 2013)
- Las reglas de la fotografía y cuándo romperlas (ISBN 9788415317197 / Published 2013)
- Accelerated Startup (ISBN 978-0998406305 / Published 2017)
- Why Photographers Prefer Cloudy Days (ISBN 9781781574546 / Published 2018)
- Beginner's guide to photography (ISBN 9781781575109 / Published 2018)
- Pitch Perfect (ISBN 978-1-484260647 / Published 2020)

=== Other book credits ===
- Project editor: Lights, Camera, Capture! by Bob Davis (ISBN 978-0470549537 / Published 2010)
- Technical editor: HDR Photography Workshop by Pete Carr and Robert Correll (ISBN 978-0470549537 / Published 2009)
- Technical editor: Creative Close-ups by Harold Davis (ISBN 978-0470527122 / Published 2009)
- Technical editor: Digital Field Guides: Exposure by Alan Hess (ISBN 978-0470534908 / Published 2009)
- Contributing Photographer: Photos that Inspire by Lynne Eodice (ISBN 978-0470119556 / Published 2007)
