= Highland, Missouri =

Unincorporated community in Missouri, U.S.

- unincorporated community
- Location of Perry County, Missouri
- Coordinates: 37°39′52″N 89°53′29″W
- Country: United States
- State: Missouri
- County: Perry
- Township: Cinque Hommes
- Elevation: 666 ft (203 m)
- Time zone: UTC-6 (Central (CST))
  - Summer (DST): UTC-5 (CDT)
- ZIP code: 63775
- Area code: 573
- FIPS code: 29-32050
- GNIS feature ID: 719560

Highland is an unincorporated community in Cinque Hommes Township in Perry County, Missouri, United States.

== History ==
Highland's name is topographical and was named after a nearby creek. It is located in the north-central part of Cinque Hommes Township. A post office was maintained there between 1891 – 1904.

The community has a Catholic church, St. Joseph parish, which was founded in 1870.

== Geography ==
Highland is located four and one-half miles southwest of Perryville.

== Notable person ==
- Vincent Joseph Dunker (1878–1974), a photographer, inventor, and camera manufacturer was born in Highland, Missouri
