= Cactus (camera equipment brand) =

Camera equipment brand

- Company type: Private
- Industry: Photographic equipment
- Founded: 2004
- Headquarters: Hong Kong
- Products: Wireless flash triggers, laser triggers, camera flashes, studio lighting equipment
- Website: www.cactus-image.com

Cactus is a brand owned by Harvest One Limited, a Hong Kong company specialized in the design and engineering of photographic wireless lighting equipment including wireless flash triggers, wireless flashes, portable softboxes and studio umbrellas. Its headquarters is in Tuen Mun, Hong Kong.

In 2014, Cactus released a cross-brand wireless flash transceiver that can simultaneously remote control power of Canon, Nikon, Olympus, Panasonic and Pentax flashes on any camera.

== Products ==
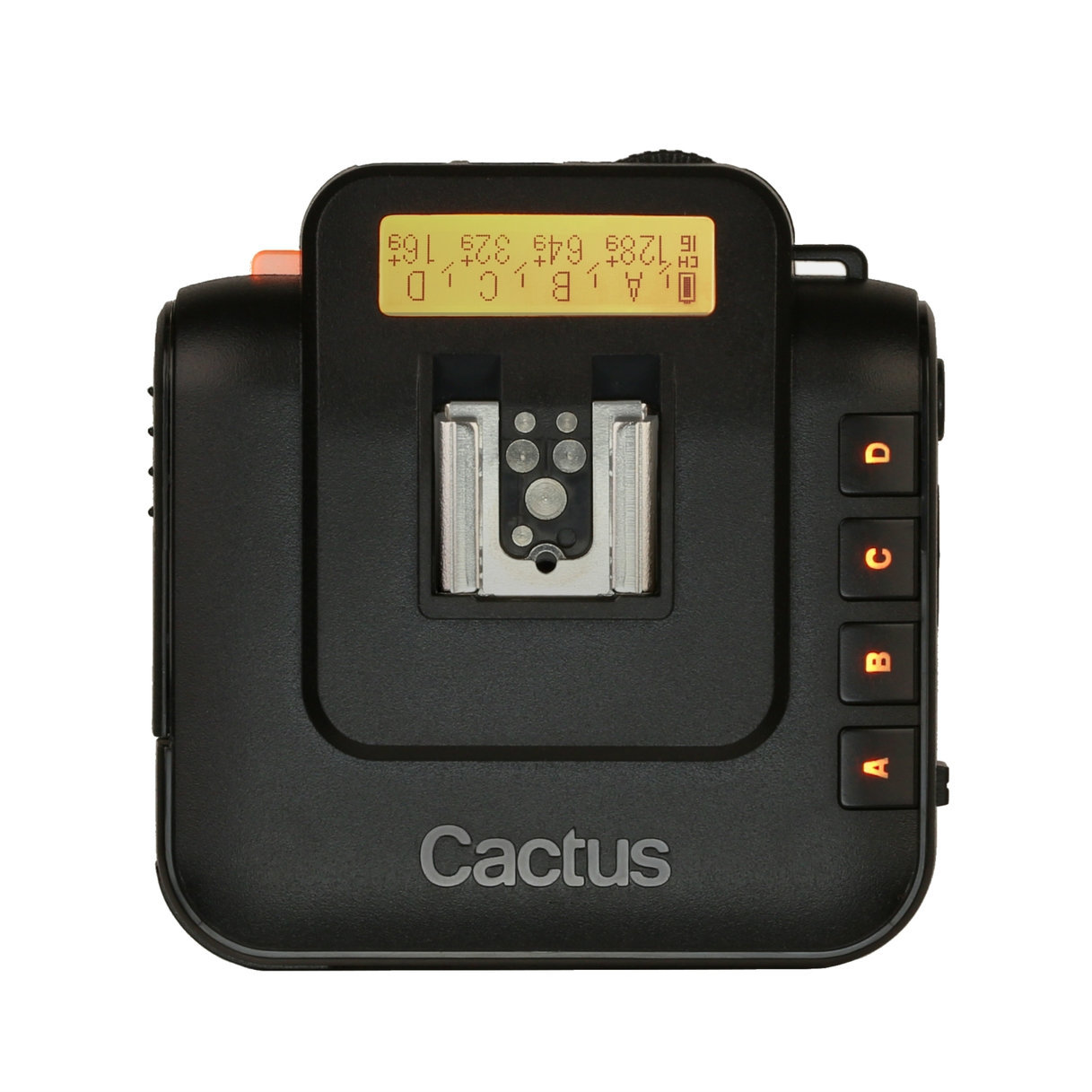
Cactus V6

=== Wireless flash trigger and transceiver ===
Cactus has been manufacturing wireless flash triggers using radio signal since 2007 and has been focusing its research on cross-brand compatibility in radio flash triggering system. Its V4 wireless flash trigger and V5 wireless flash transceiver are both equipped with a multi-pin hotshoe and work with most of the portable flashes, but are not able to remote control power of the flashes. Until 2014, Cactus combined the proprietary electronic extensions of Nikon, Olympus, Panasonic and Pentax into a multi-brand hot shoe and released the V6 model with which the power of multi-brand flashes can be remotely controlled wirelessly.

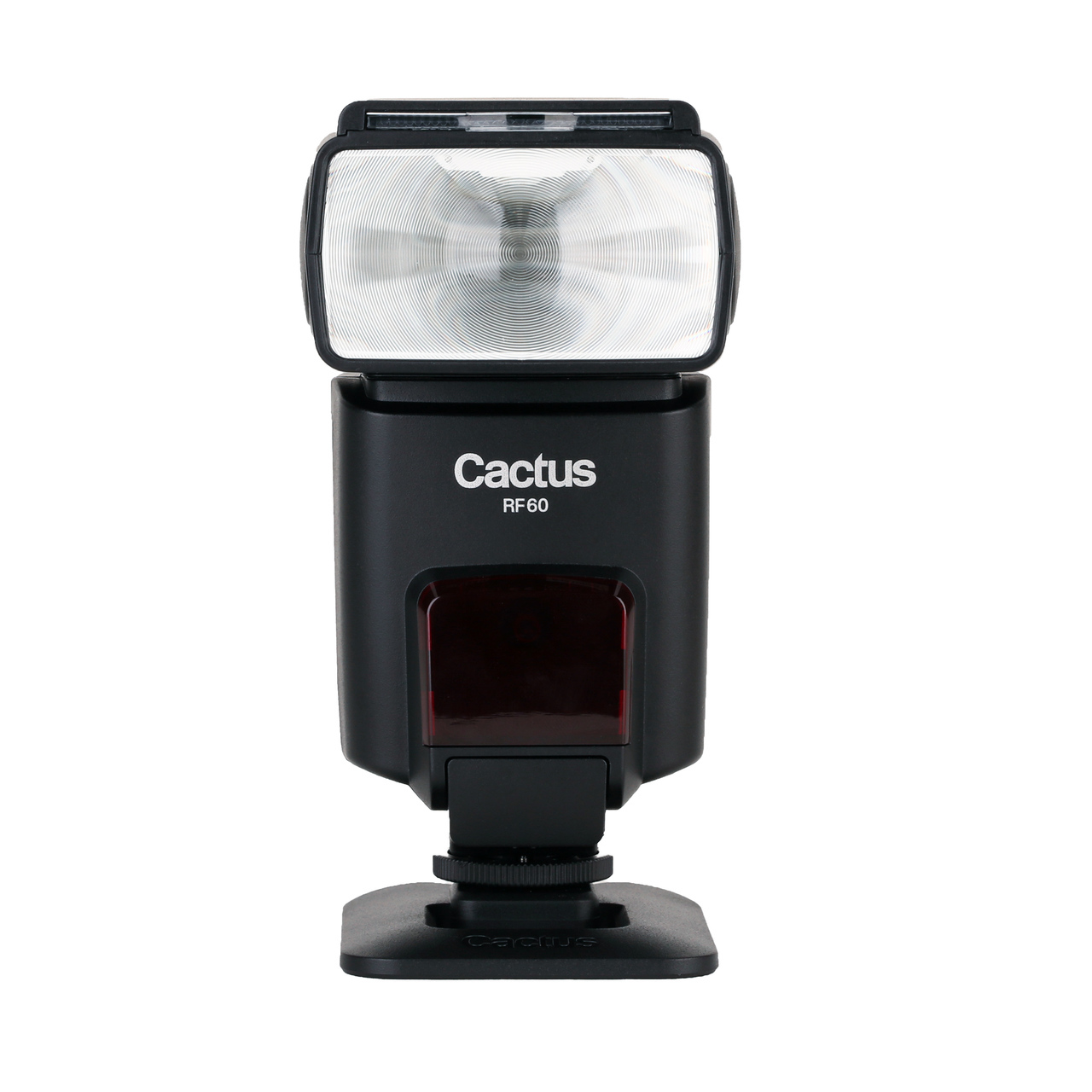
Cactus RF60

=== Wireless flash ===
In 2014, Cactus released its first wireless flash RF60 along with Cactus V6. Cactus RF60 has a built-in V6. Therefore, it can receive wireless triggering signal from a V6 and fire itself accordingly without having to attach an external V6 to the flash. When using with Cactus V6, both power output and zoom level of the RF60 can be adjusted remotely.

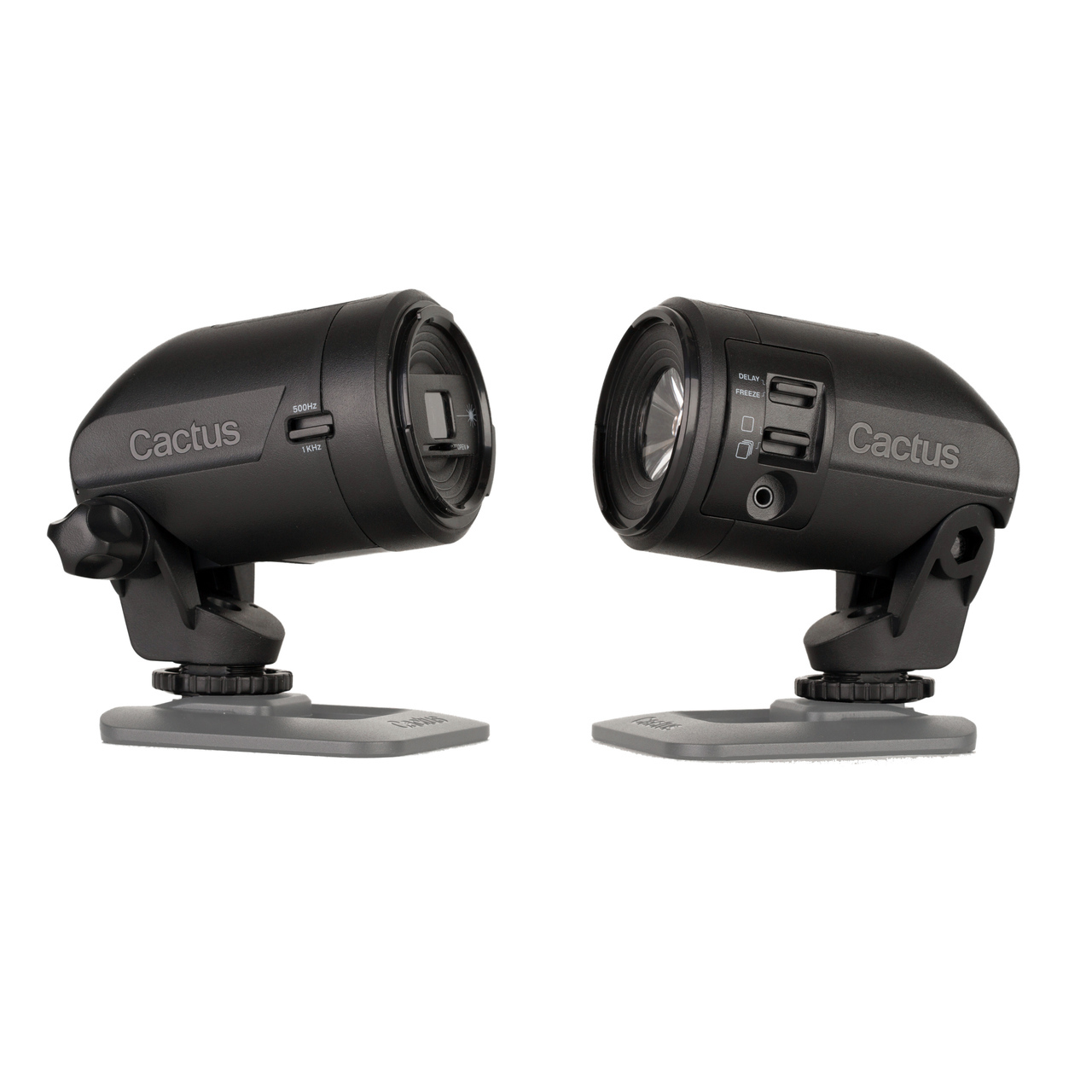
Cactus LV5

=== Laser trigger ===
In 2013, Cactus developed the world's first laser trigger that has built-in radio frequency module for high-speed, wildlife and trap photography.

=== Camera accessories ===
Cactus also manufactures studio umbrellas and softboxes.

== Recognition ==
Cactus LV5 Laser Trigger was given a 5-star rating by Digital Photo UK in its May issue 2013 and Le Monde de la Photo, France in its September issue 2013.

Cactus is among the five brands shortlisted for Accessory Manufacturer of the Year in the UK's Pixel Trade Award 2014.

Cactus V6 Wireless Flash Transceiver and Cactus RF60 Wireless Flash were selected by Popular Photography as 2014 Best Camera Deals of the Year.

Cactus V6 Wireless Flash Transceiver is the winner of Japan's Digital Camera Grand Prix (DGP) Gold Award 2015.
