= Pixiq =

Pixiq was a photography website for photo experts and enthusiasts to engage in an open and on-going dialog about photography, aimed at teaching photography, news, techniques, etc. It was run by Sterling Publishing, which is owned by the United States book chain Barnes & Noble. As of 10 May 2013, Pixiq is no longer operational, a move by its owner. Users are invited to visit Sterling Publishing's website for more information on Pixiq's photography books.

== Description ==
The website was populated by professional photographers and photobloggers who published, posted, commented, reviewed and conversed in a dynamic and vibrant online community. Pixiq was an informative place on the web for all digital image-makers.

Managed by online editor Damien Franco, authors and photographers on Pixiq included Haje Jan Kamps, Daniela Bowker, Carlos Miller, and Jose Antunes. The site covered everything about photography, ranging from the fundamentals of how lenses work, how to set apertures, depth of field, focal length etc., to more specialised, in-depth topics.
