= Vageeswari camera =

Indian camera brand

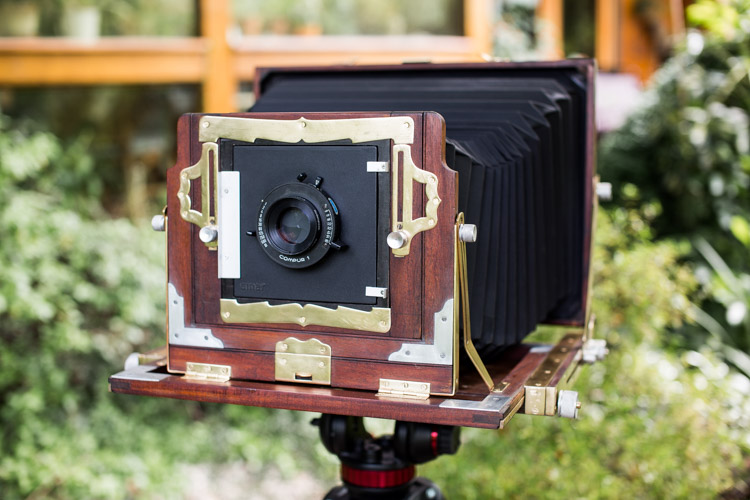
Foldable 8,5×15" Vageeswari Camera

Vageeswari cameras were Indian large format cameras manufactured by Vageeshwari Camera Works. They were the first field camera manufactured in India and were recognised globally. Vageeswari cameras were designed and manufactured by K. Karunakaran, an Alappuzha-based technician.

Cameras were named after the goddess Saraswati. The first camera came with a price tag of Rs 250. Leading photographers appreciated it for its impeccable accuracy and perfect quality. Many Japanese camera manufacturers copied Vageeshwari's models and designed field cameras.

== History ==
In 1942, Padmanabhan Nair, a photo studio owner, asked Kunju Kunju Bhagavathar, a musician, to fix his camera's torn bellows. Bhagavathar was able to fix it and Nair was surprised when he saw that the camera worked better than ever before. Nair then suggested that Bhagavathar make a camera himself, but he declined. However his son, Karunakaran, took on the challenge. He started asking about the details of camera construction and even traveled to Chennai, Bangalore and Mumbai to learn more. He deconstructed an old camera and then put it back together.

In 1946, Karunakaran finally built the first Vageeswari camera. It was on par with foreign cameras and sold at a fraction of their price. They were an instant hit. The British officers bought Vageeswari cameras and took them home, which caused the demand for camera to surge in Britain and other colonial countries. Meanwhile, the license to import lenses from Japan and Germany was also obtained. Edward de Mello, an Anglo-Indian, was made head of international sales. He started shipping Vageeshwari cameras to Ceylon, Singapore, Malaysia, Nepal and Thailand.

By 1950s, Karunakaran manufactured between 50 and 100 cameras per month and employed 30 people. By 1960s, he also got orders from Germany and Sri Lanka. By 1980s, Vageeswari started becoming obsolete as the market started favouring compact cameras. As demand for cameras fell, Karunakaran diversified and started manufacturing other types of cameras. He designed a camera for the printing sector and one for the technical sector. In 1982, he created a camera for an ultrasound scanning machine. However, the diversification failed and in 1995, Vageeswari camera completely collapsed. The last Vageswari camera was made for platinum photography.

On 19 April 2016, K Karunakaran, aged 90, passed away. The camera has seen a revival in attention. In 2021, Lokame Tharavadu exhibition, organized by Kochi Biennale Foundation, was held where Vageeswari cameras and photographs were showcased. People like Satheesh Nair are now restoring Vageeswari cameras. Today, Vageeswari cameras are found in various camera collections in Germany and England.

== Construction ==
The body was made of teak. Brass and aluminium knobs as well as Nettlefold screws held the frame together. German lenses were attached to a leather bellow. It took 18 hours to make one bellow. The cameras were entirely assembled by hand and Karunakaran attached the lens to each camera himself. Vageeswari cameras used glass, which was imported from the United States, coated with chemicals instead of film.

Eight variants were produced that ranged from small cameras that took a maximum of four passport-size photos to a large 20 x 16 size camera. He also manufactured fingerprint cameras, panorama cameras, cameras for medical purposes and ultrasound scanners.

== See also ==
- List of photographic equipment makers
- Field camera
- List of camera types
