= Deardorff =

L.F. Deardorff & Sons Inc. was a manufacturer of wooden-construction, large-format 4"x5" and larger bellows view camera from 1923 through 1988. They were used by professional photographic studios.

== Company history ==
Laban F. Deardorff repaired cameras for nearly 30 years before building the first 8x10 Deardorff. He had been employed by Rochester Camera Company in Rochester, New York, during the 1890s.

== Model history ==
Almost all Deardorff cameras were made of mahogany.

- 1923 saw the first model, the V8 (or VO8) built in Chicago. 15 models were built.
- 1924 V8 – 50 units built
- 1925 V8 – 175 units built
- 1926 – the first batch production. Reference to a 5x7 Deardorff
- 1937 – started nickel plating and changed to mahogany wood.
- 1938 – stainless steel first used
- 1942 – rounded corners for the lens boards
- 1944 – Spanish cedar used in some cameras
- 1950 – front swing capability first introduced; 8"x10" camera serial numbers begin at "500" in May 1950
- 1952 – round metal bed plate
- 1967 – knobs changed to aluminum from nickel-plated brass
- 1988 – last year of production
- Present – cameras are still in production today, in small quantities, but built to original Chicago specifications

== General features ==
All of the Deardorff view cameras featured swing and tilt movements, and there were optional accessories such as stands and cases.

The 8x20, 12x20, 11x14 All Deardorff model featured:

- Vertical swing of the back
- Lateral swing of the back
- Vertical swing of the front 30 degrees each side of center

== Photographers' experiences in using the camera ==
Photographer David Munson has related his experiences in restoring and using a Deardorff 8x10. Kevin Klazek also related his experience in restoring a Deardorff V8 in ''View Camera'' magazine.

== Publications showing Deardorffs ==
The February 1998 25th anniversary edition of Texas Monthly featured a Deardorff on the cover and said:

The cover shot with the lens in the shape of the state of Texas, mounted on an 8x10 Deardorff, was shot by Pete McArthur. The lens itself was designed by Rick Elden. The work of over 75 photographers was included in their "100 best", including Richard Avedon, Annie Leibovitz, Helmut Newton, Jim Myers, Kent Kirkley, Mary Ellen Mark, Larry Fink and many others.

== See also ==
- Field camera
