= Hartblei =

International manufacturer of optical equipment, primarily known for tilt-shift lenses

Company logo

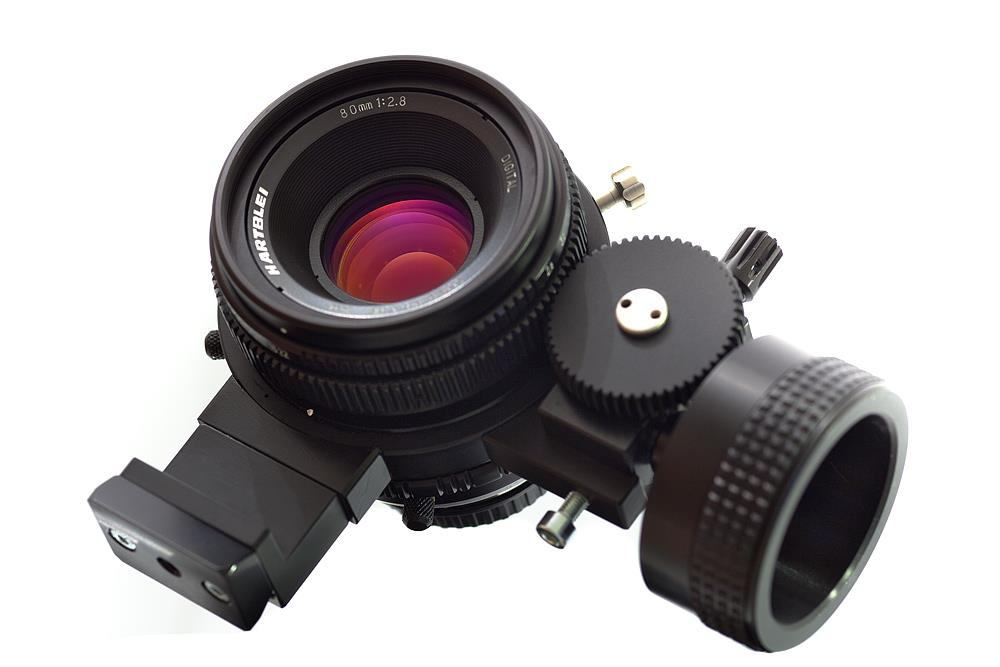
80 mm f/2.8 MC TS-PC Super-Rotator (Full Frame Format)

Hartblei is an international manufacturer of optical equipment for photography based in Kyiv and Munich. They are primarily known for producing tilt-shift lenses (Super-Rotator).

In 2006 Hartblei started a collaboration with Carl Zeiss AG, adapting Zeiss lens designs for tilt-shift use.

== Lenses ==
Using the unique Super-Rotator design, Hartblei tilt-shift lenses are capable of tilting in any axis, making it more flexible than other lenses such as the Canon TS-E 90mm lens.

Hartblei Super-Rotator lenses are 360° tilt-shift lenses. Some current versions of the Super-Rotator feature German-made Zeiss optics.

Hartblei optics (full frame format)

- 35 mm f/2.8 MC TS-PC Super-Rotator
- 65 mm f/3.5 MC TS-PC Super-Rotator
- 80 mm f/2.8 MC TS-PC Super-Rotator
- 120 mm f/2.8 MC TS-PC Super-Rotator

Hartblei optics (medium format)

- 45 mm f/3.5 MC TS-PC Super-Rotator

Hartblei "Optics by Carl Zeiss" (full frame format)

- 40 mm f/4 IF TS Super-Rotator
- 80 mm f/2,8 TS Super-Rotator
- 120 mm f/4 TS Macro Super-Rotator

== See also ==
- Perspective correction lens
- Nikon F-mount
- List of photographic equipment makers
