= Ross (optics) =

British optical company

Ross is the name of a succession of London-based lens designers and their company.

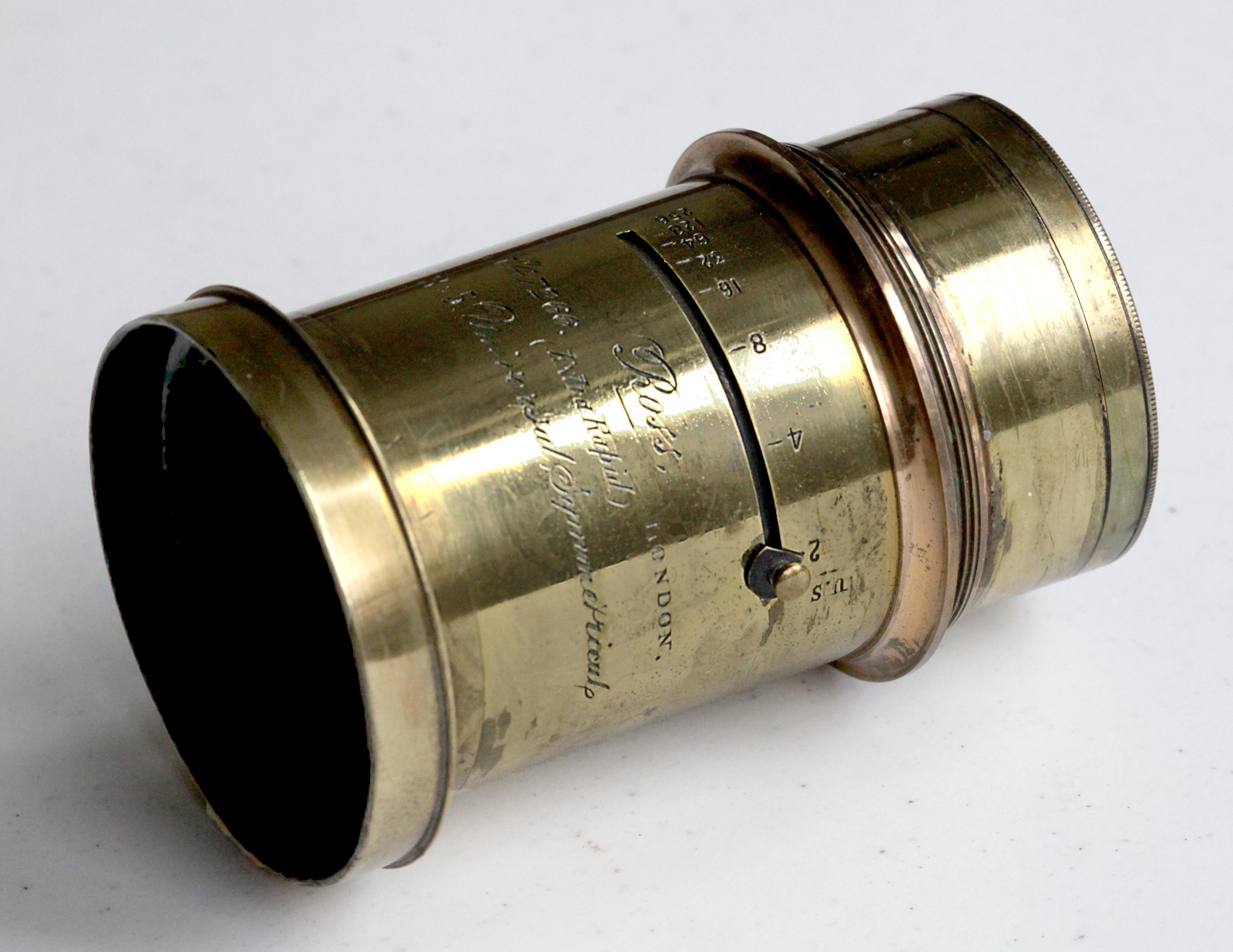
Ross Extra Rapid 8x5 lens of about 1880

Andrew Ross (1798–1859) founded his company in 1830; from 1840 he began producing camera lenses signed "A. Ross". During his lifetime, the company was one of the foremost lens manufacturers. The year after his death in 1859, his son-in-law John Henry Dallmeyer left the firm to establish his own optical company and the company was run by Ross's son, Thomas, and became known as Ross & Co.

By the 1890s it was also making Zeiss and Goerz lenses under licence for sale in the UK and the British Empire. Ross patented a wide-angle lens design and Zeiss took this further to produce their EWA Protars. Before World War 1, Ross and Zeiss worked quite closely together, but at the outbreak of War the British Government put Ross in control of the newly opened Carl Zeiss binocular and optical factory in Mill Hill, London.

A 1902 Ross advertisement includes:

- Ross Symmetrical Anastigmats
- Zeiss New Planar and Unar lenses
- Zeiss Convertible Anastigmats
- Goerz Double Anastigmats

Ross also made some cameras from about 1855 to the late 1930s. A range of Ross Standard Reflex cameras is listed with an illustration in the 1935 British Journal Photographic Almanac, the sizes ranged from 3 1/2 by 2 1/2 inches (89 mm × 64 mm) up to half plate.

During WWI and WWII Ross Limited produced pattern 373 and 373B "Officer of the Watch" telescopes for the Royal Navy.

Ross pattern 373B single-draw Royal Navy Officer of the Watch telescope engraving

In the mid-20th century, Ross continued to produce lenses, as well as binoculars, epidiascopes, etc. They had begun supplying lenses for Ensign cameras in the 1930s. After World War II Ross merged with Barnet Ensign, and the company later became Ross Ensign, lenses were also made for other companies such as MPP.

Ross was taken over by Avimo in 1975; Avimo was later taken over by Thales Optics.

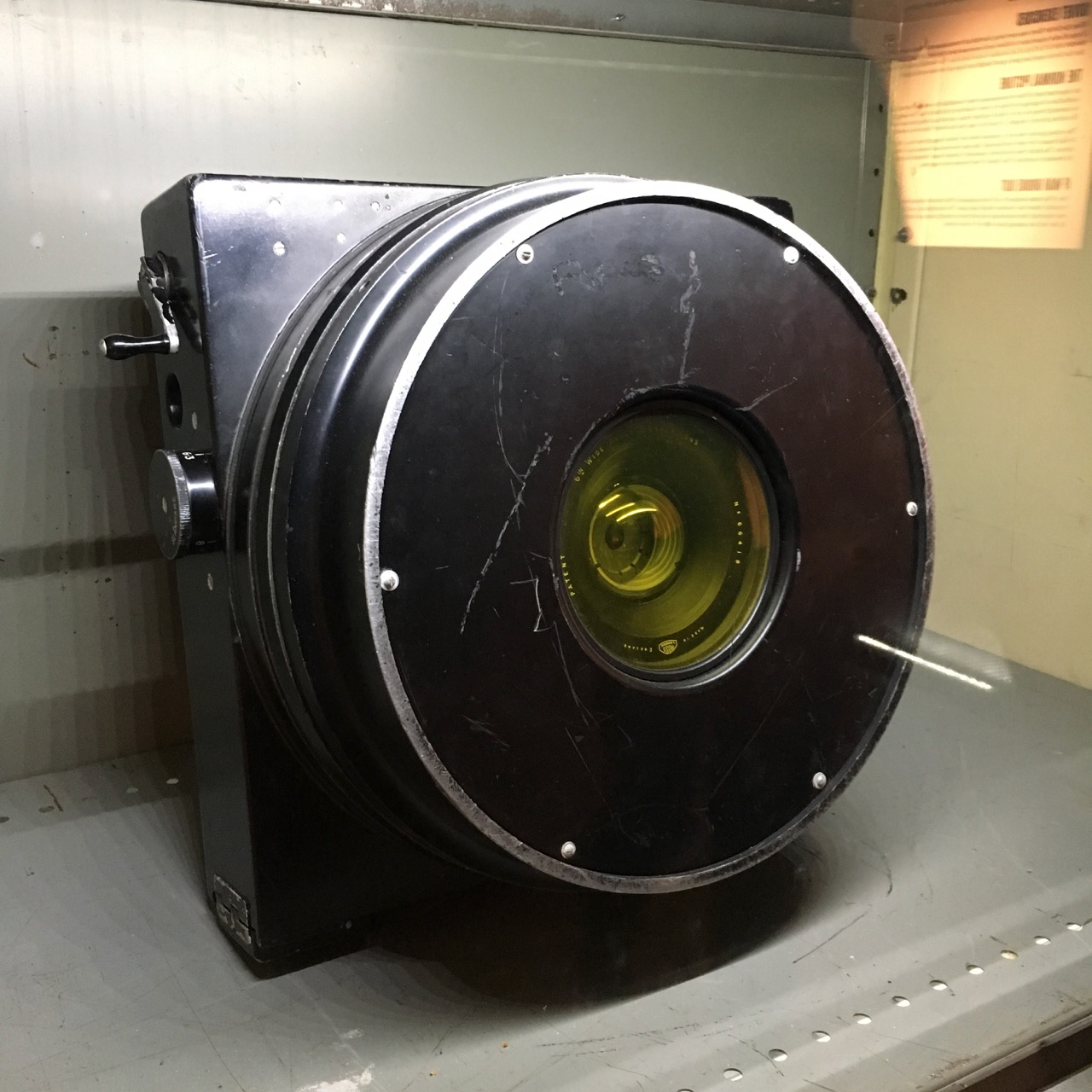
A Ross wide-angle lens mounted in an aerial surveillance camera, Swedish Air Force Museum, Linköping.

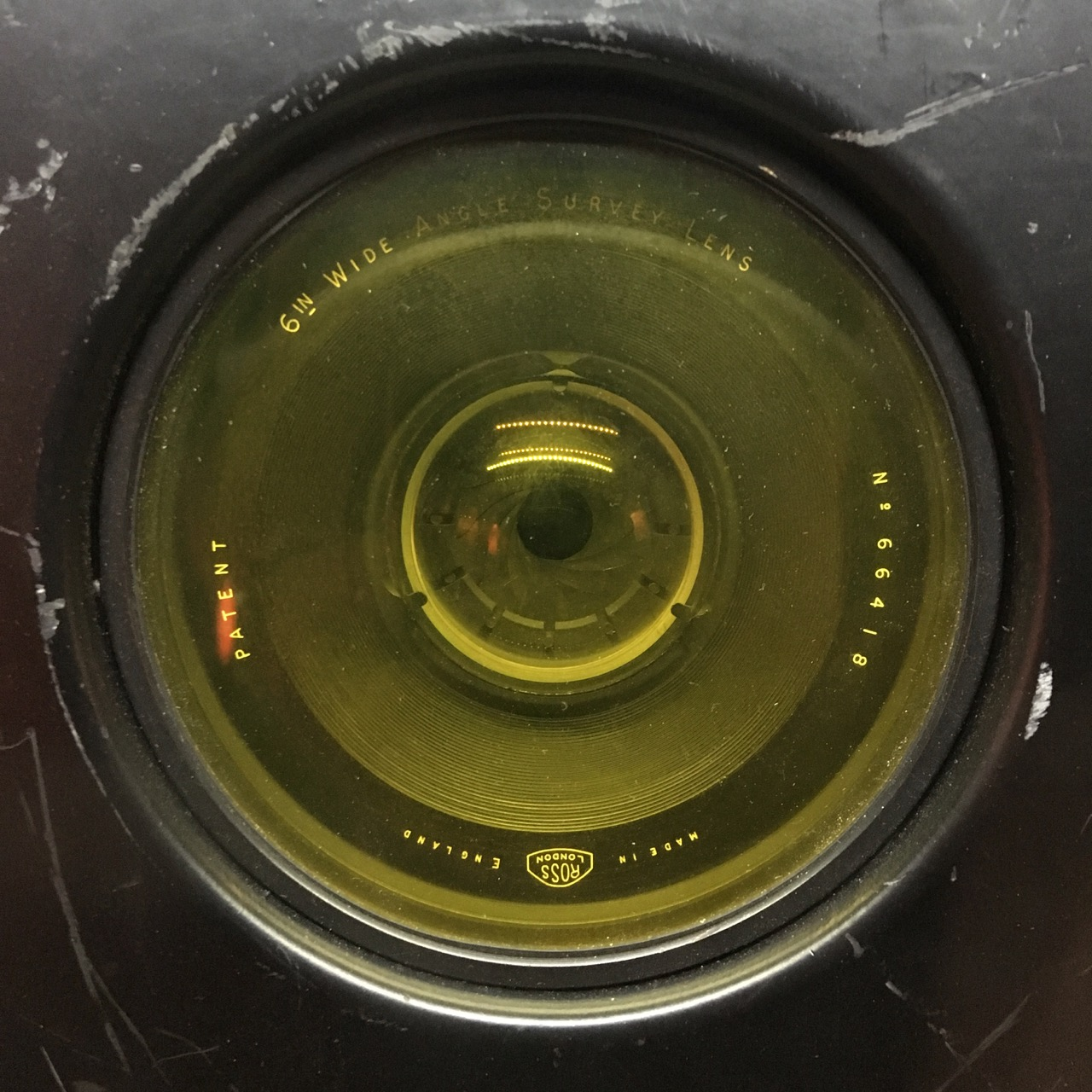
Close-up of the Ross wide-angle lens.

== Sources ==
- Wilkinson, Matthew, and Colin Glanfield. A lens collector's vade mecum. (CD publication) "Version 7/5/2001" (7 May 2001).
- British Journal Photographic Almanac 1935, Henry Greenwood & Co 1935

Ross logo
