= Leidolf =

Leidolf GmbH
- Company type: Gesellschaft mit beschränkter Haftung
- Industry: Photography, Still cameras, lenses
- Founded: 1921
- Defunct: 1962
- Headquarters: Wetzlar, Germany
- Key people: Rudolf Leidolf

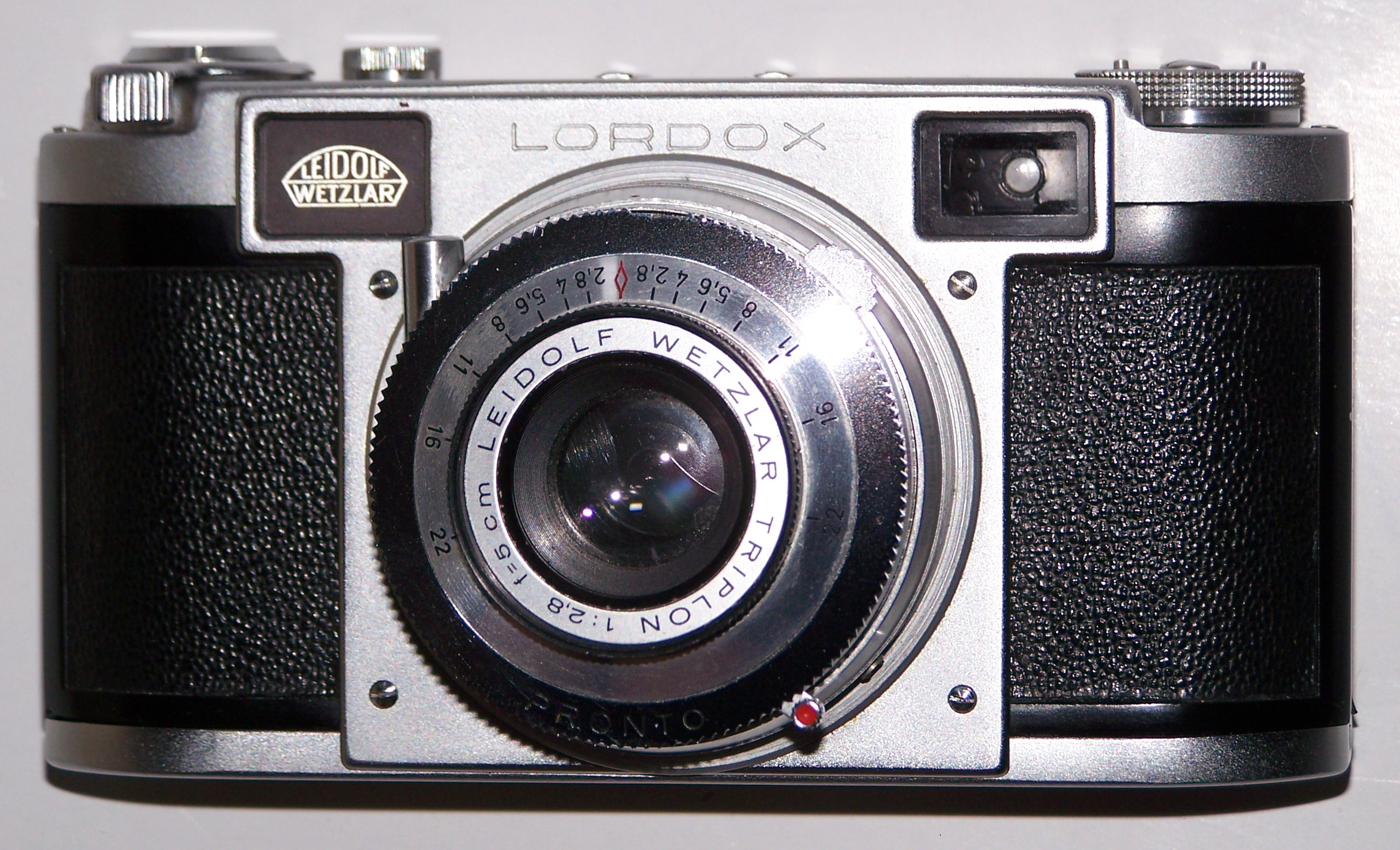
A Leidolf Lordox Pronto (1958) Viewfinder model.

Leidolf was a manufacturer of optical equipment located in Wetzlar, Germany.Leidolf It was founded by Rudolf Leidolf in 1921, initially producing lenses for microscopes. Camera production began in 1948. The company was commissioned by Adams to produce models 351 and 352, which were sold by Montgomery Ward. Leidolf ceased operations in 1962. Leidolf was not related to Leitz (the manufacturer of Leica), although both companies were located in Wetzlar.

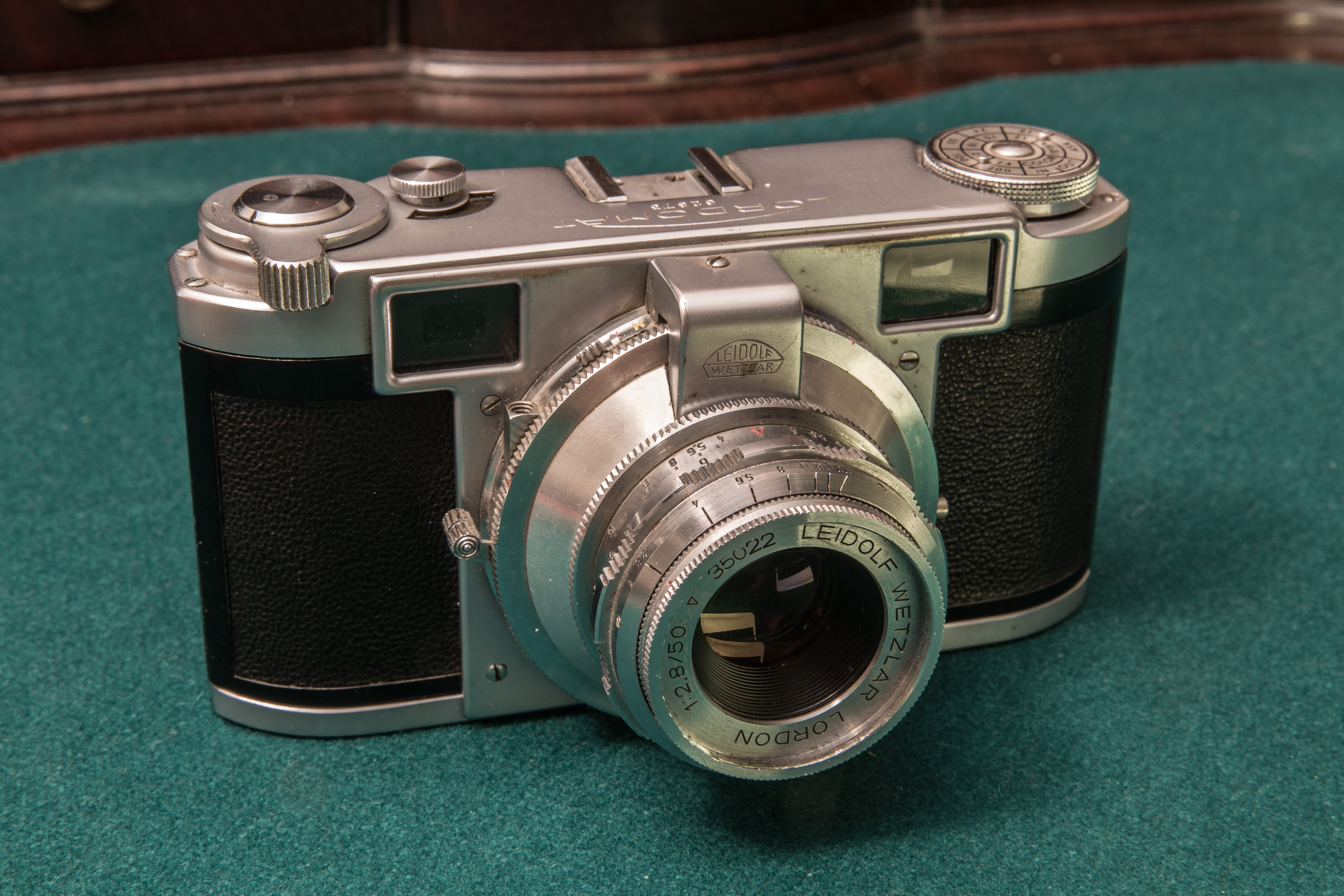
Leidolf Lordomat

== Camera models ==
- Leidax, Leidox (1949)
- Lordomat (C35/SE/SLE) (1953)
- Lordox Junior (1954)
- Lordette (1955)
- Lordomatic (1955)
- Lordomatic IIR (1955)
- Lordox 57 (1954)
- Lordox Vollautomat (1960)
- Lordox Super Automat (1960)
- Unimatic (1961)
- Adams model 351 (1961)
- Adams model 352 (?)
