= Sunpak =

Japanese photographic equipment manufacturer

Sunpak was a Japanese manufacturer of photographic equipment, namely third-party electronic flashes.

== History ==
Sunpak's first product, a compact flash unit called the Sunpak 7, was released in 1963, although the company was only incorporated in 1972.

Sunpak was a popular brand of auto-thyristor flashes in the 1970s and 1980s. Along with on-camera and handle-mounted "potato masher" flashes, the company produced various flash accessories as well as a waterproof flash.

In 2007 Sunpak — at the time the lighting division of Tocad Energy — was merged with Sea&Sea, a manufacturer of accessories for underwater photography; the combined entity was renamed to SEA&SEA SUNPAK Co.Ltd., while Tocad America continued to be the brand's U.S. distributor.

By mid-2019, with no formal announcement, Sunpak's website was reverted to show Tocad Energy as the company's legal entity, while the 2007 corporate site (www.ss-sp.com) redirected to Sea&Sea's. In 2022 Sunpak's website was reduced to a single page in Japanese merely mentioning the discontinuation of support for all products.

== List of products ==
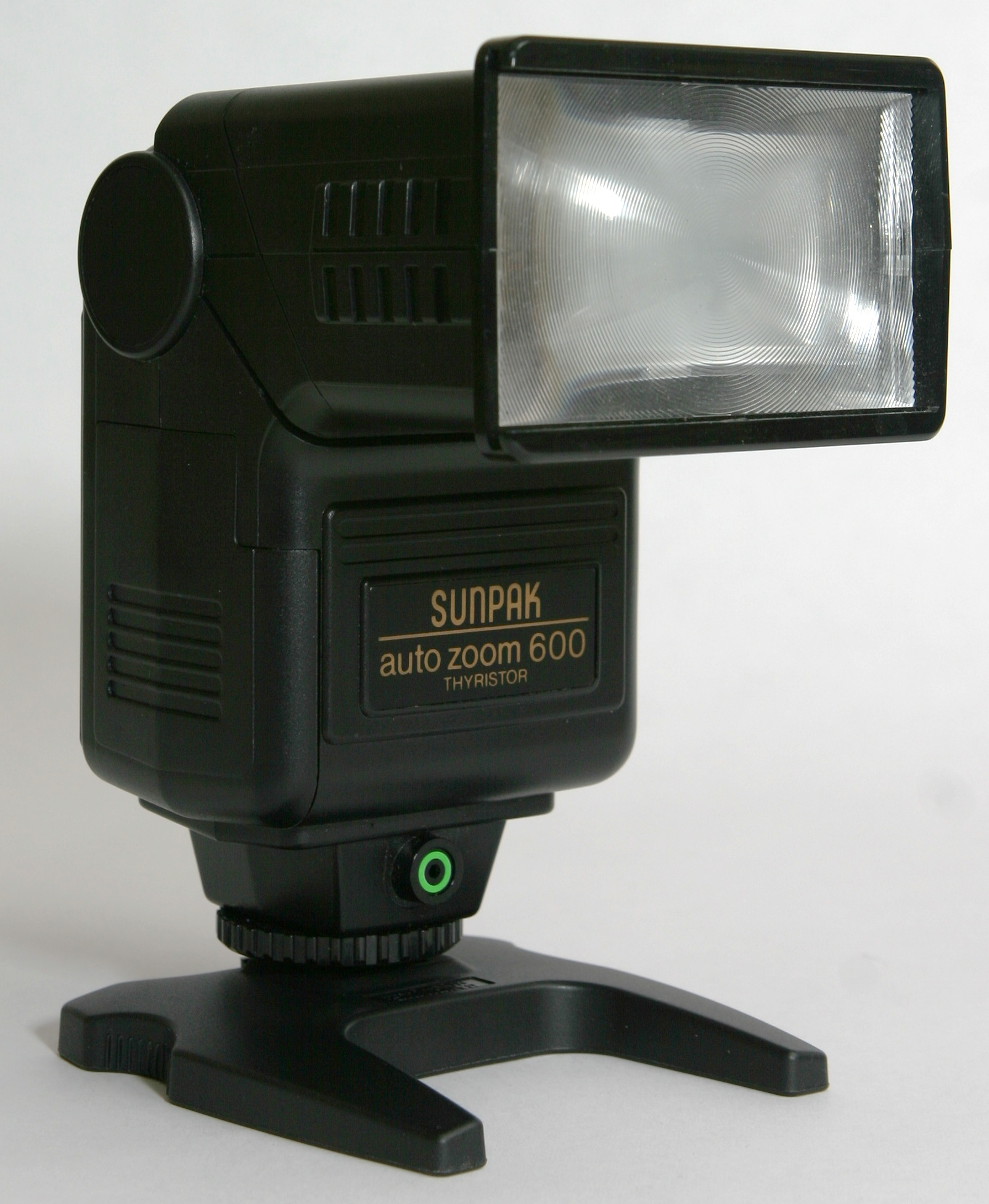
Sunpak auto zoom 600 flash

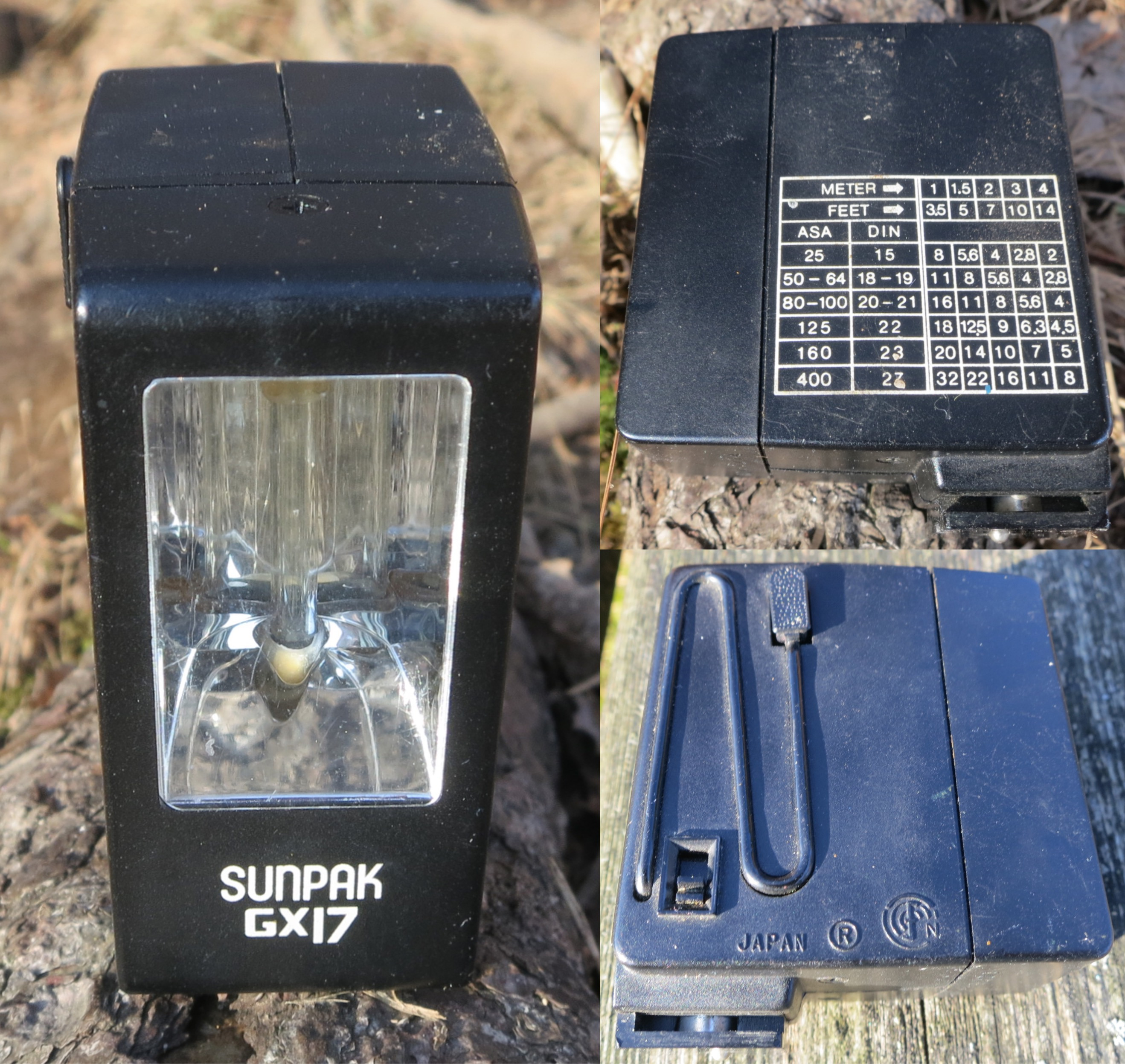
Sunpak GX17 flash

- AP-52 Handle Mount Flash
- Auto14 flash
- Auto 16R Pro
- Auto20 flash
- Auto 32B flash
- Auto 383 Super
- Auto 500
- Auto zoom 600 flash
- D macro
- DC7 Flash
- G Flash
- PF20XD
- PF30X
- PZ40X
- PZ42X
- PZ5000AF
- RD2000
- Remote Lite II
