= Foba =

Swiss photographic studio equipment company

Foba AG
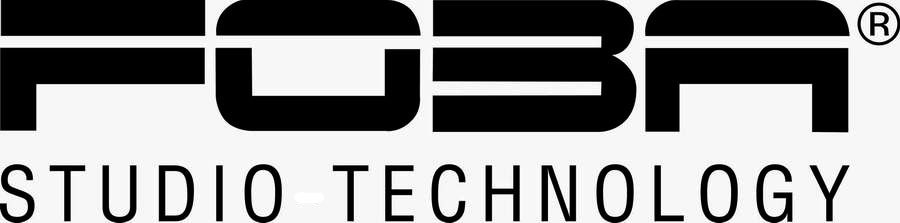
- Industry: Digital imaging
- Founded: Wettswil, Switzerland (1939)
- Headquarters: Wettswil, Switzerland
- Area served: Worldwide
- Products: ceiling rail system, tripod head, turntable, studio table
- Website: http://www.foba.ch/

FOBA AG was a Swiss company that makes photographic studio equipment.

== History ==
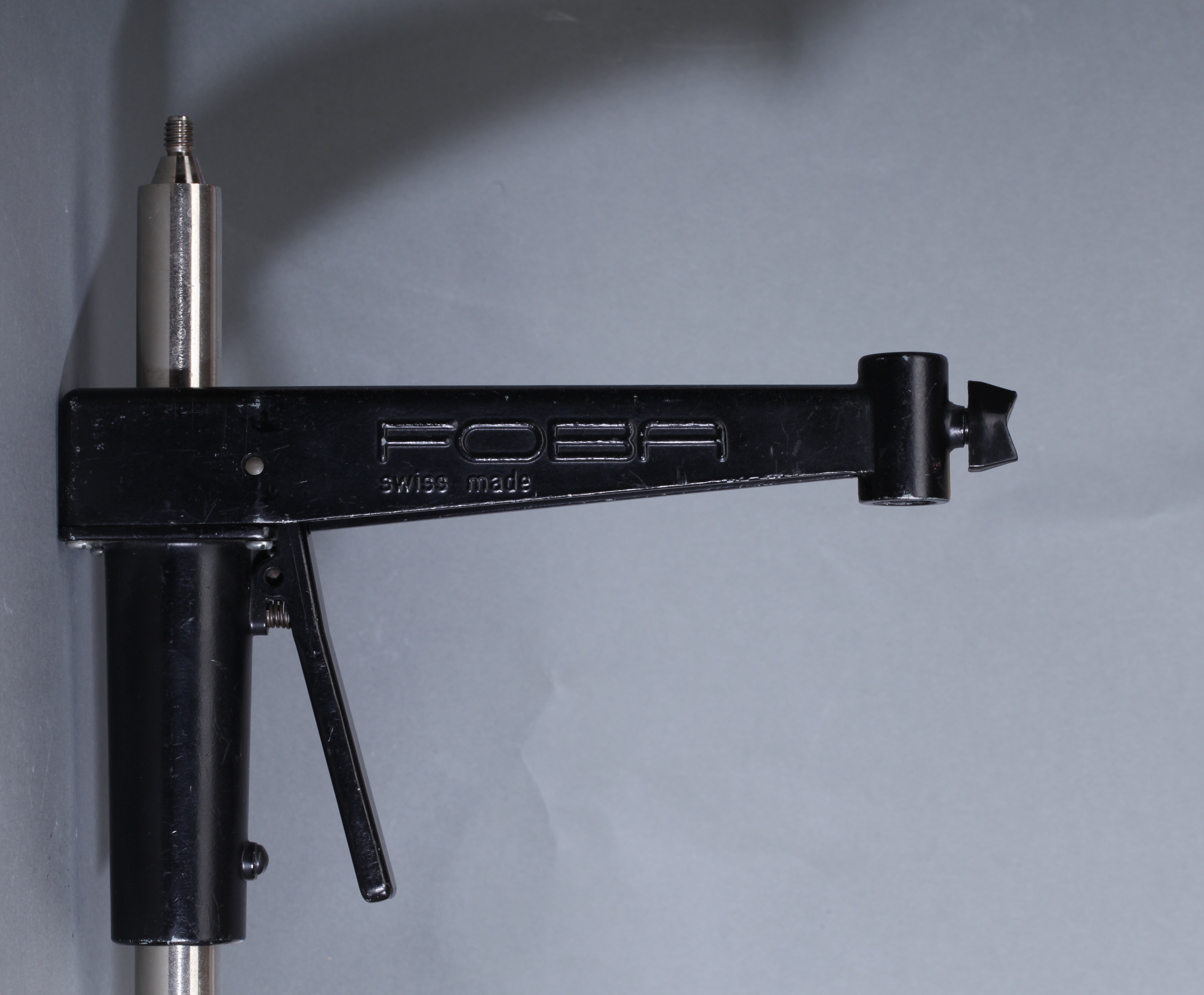
FOBA movable light holder on a pipe

In 1939, just after World War II started in Europe, imports of photography products such as lights and dry presses from Germany were reduced to a trickle. Walter Friedrich, a precisions engineer, together with his wife, began to manufacture commodities for professional photographers in their rented home's small basement. He called his startup Fotogeräte- und Elektroapparate-Bau ("Manufacturing of photographic and electrical equipment"), or FOBA. To save on shipping costs and to keep up the personal contact with his customers, Friedrich at first delivered products personally by bicycle.

The company also supplied cooking plates with integrated heating coils. This was the first in Switzerland. They ceased operations in 2024.
