= Slik Corporation =

SLIK Corporation is a manufacturer and brand of camera tripods with headquarters located in Hidaka City, Japan.

== History ==
The company was founded in 1956 as SLICK Elevator Tripod Co., Ltd. by a mechanical engineer and photography enthusiast, Takatoshi Shiraishi. Shiraishi started designing and building his own tripods in a suburb of Tokyo, Japan, in 1948. In 1963, the company name was changed to SLICK Tripod Co., Ltd. In 1967 a factory was constructed in Saitama Prefecture, Japan. In 1988, SLIK (Thailand) Co., Ltd. was established with a factory located in a Bangkok, Thailand suburb. In 1989, sales and manufacturing operations were consolidated and the company was renamed SLIK Corporation.
