= Steinheil =

Steinheil is a surname. Notable people with the surname include:

- Elsbeth Steinheil (1893-1955), first German woman to graduate in mechanical engineering, qualifying in 1917 from the Technical University of Munich
- Heinrich Steinhöwel (a.k.a. "Steinhauel", "Steinheil"; 1410, Weil – 1482, Ulm), a Swabian author, humanist, and translator
- Count Fabian (Gotthard von) Steinheil (Russian: Фаддей Фёдорович Штейнгель Faddej F. Štejngel'; 1762, in the Kreis Hapsal - 1831), an Estonia-born Baltic-German nobleman
- Carl August von Steinheil (1801, Ribeauvillé, Alsace – 1870), Alsatian-German physicist
- Eduard Wilhelm Steinheil (1830, Munich – 1879, Colombia), German entomologist and engineer
- (Édouard Charles) Adolphe Steinheil (1850, Paris – 1908, Paris), a French painter
- Marguerite "Meg" (Jeanne) Steinheil, Lady (ée) Abinger (1869, Beaucourt – 1954), French woman, married with Adolph

== See also ==
- Steinheil (crater), named after Carl August von Steinheil
- C. A. Steinheil & Söhne, company, manufacturer of cameras, lenses and photographic equipment in Germany
