= Camera Taiyōdō =

Japanese Camera manufacturer (1948–1963)

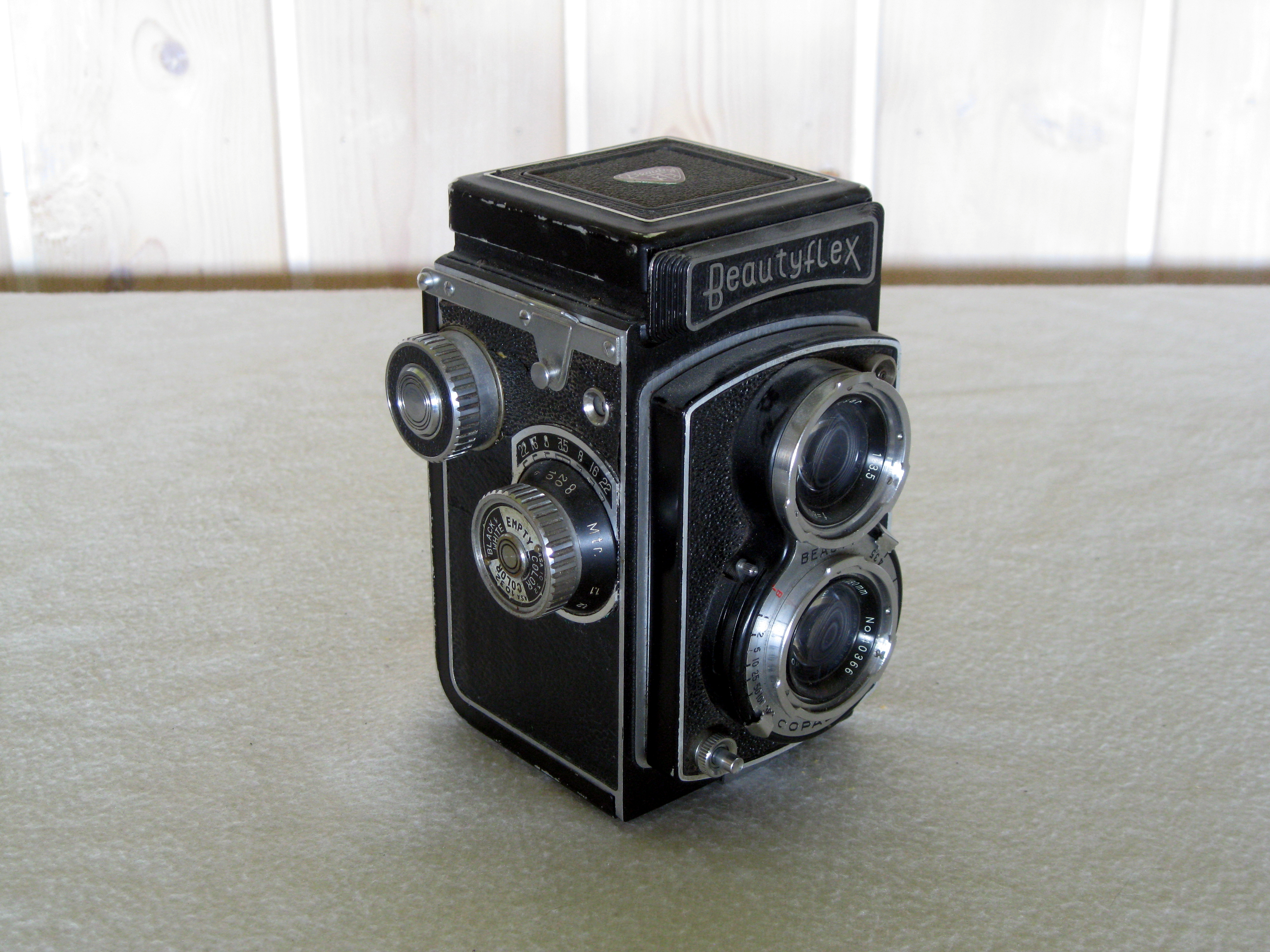
Beautyflex camera

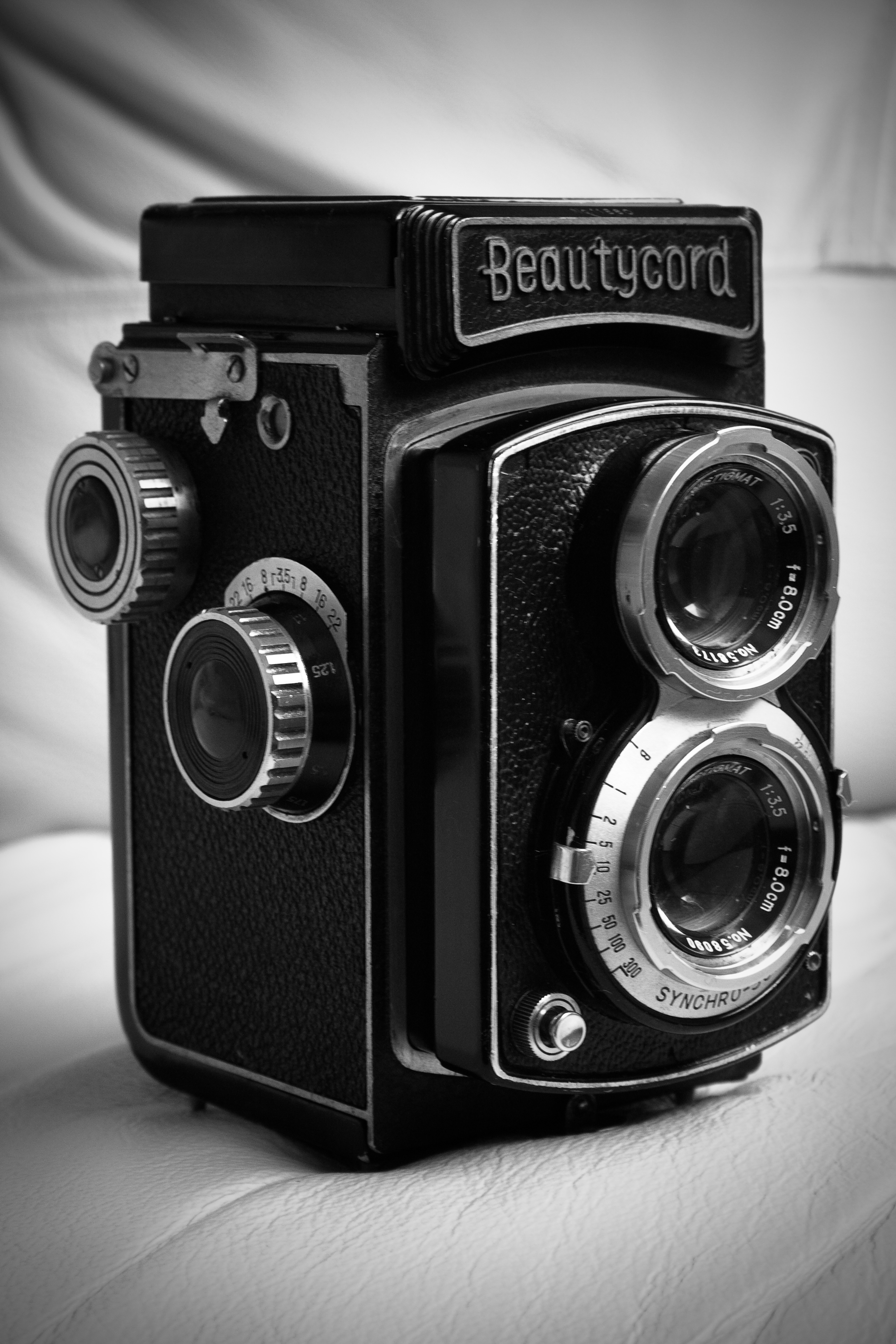
Beautycord camera

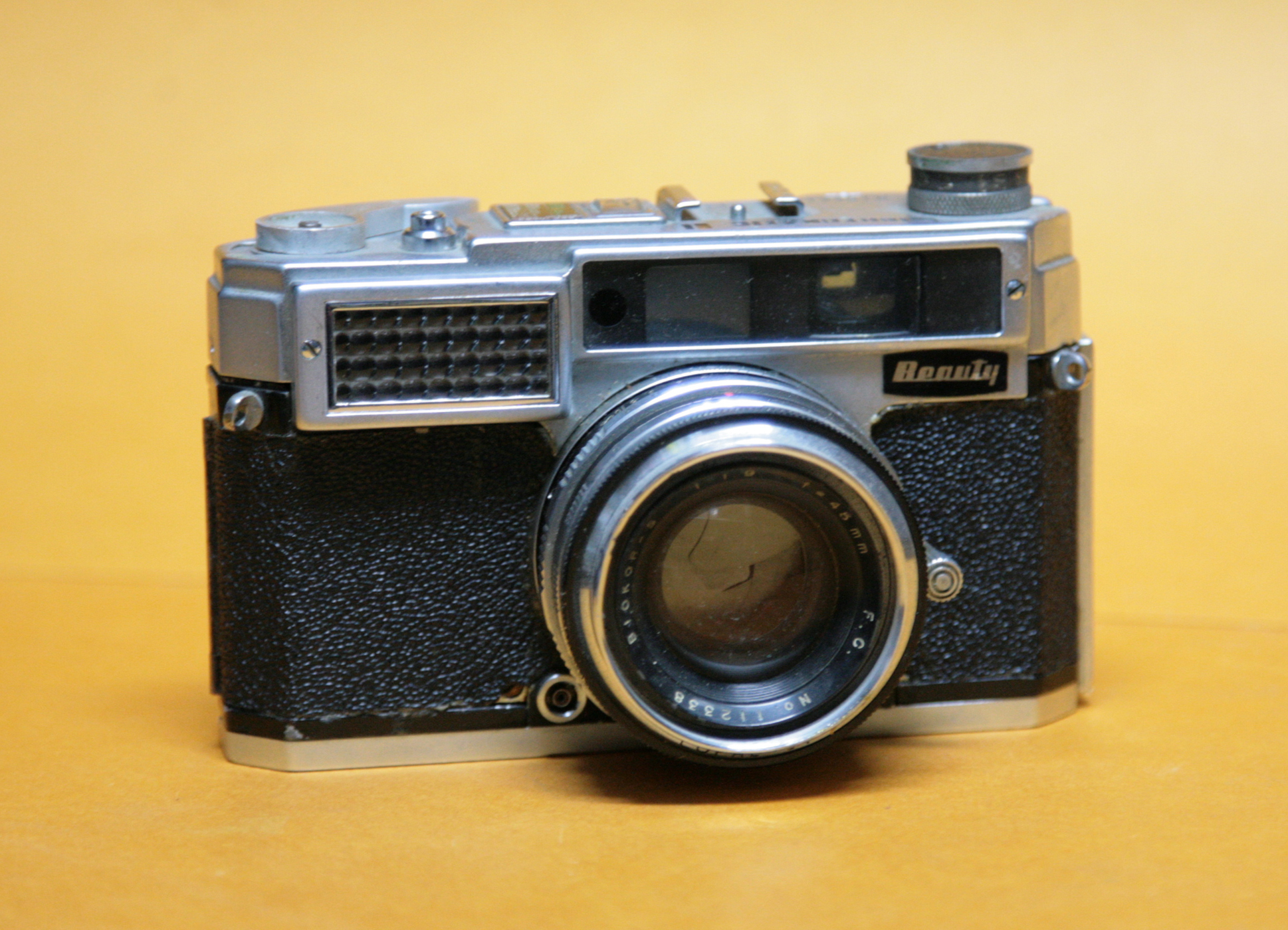
Coll. Marè CL - Beauty Camera Lightomatic II 1960

Camera Taiyōdō (カメラ太陽堂) was a shop at the Jinbōchō Crossing, Chiyoda, Tokyo, opened in 1947 by Kunio Doi. It initially sold second-hand cameras. Advertisements offering to purchase and exchange equipment where placed in the January and July 1946 issues of Ars Camera (a magazine for amateur enthusiasts) and local theatre programmes.

The beginnings of the company were recounted in a 2010 interview of the veteran staff of Camera Taiyōdō published by Senshu University of Chiyoda. This document records the that Camera Taiyōdō added the manufacturing arm - Taiyōdō Koki (太陽堂光機㈱) - in 1948. The camera factory was located behind the Jinbōchō Crossing shop, the store entrance being on the front of a four-story facility, which is still known as the "Camera Taiyōdō Building" today.

In the early 1950s Taiyōdō Koki made various types of cameras beginning with sub-miniatures followed by a 6x6 folder and SLR, but were best known for TLRs given names that were variations of Beauty (e.g. Beauty, Beautyflex, Beautycord). These were sold from their Tokyo shops mainly to US troops, exported to North European countries, the US, Asia and South America. They were also rebadged for sale outside of Japan by the Dutch importer Fodor (Fodorflex), Miller-Outcult (Milo 35) and the United States Camera Corporation of Chicago (USC Auto 50), plus the mail-order giant Ward Montgomery (Wardflex) in the USA. Taiyōdō Koki also rebranded some of their products under the name "Gen" for sale in Canada, and "CSL Photoflex" (the market for which is a mystery).

According to page 104 of "The History of the Japanese Camera", which list Japanese companies that became bankrupt, Taiyōdō Koki suffered a similar fate in September 1957. However, page 1306 of the 2003 "Distribution Company Yearbook" (流通会社年鑑) published by "Japan Keizai Shimbun" (日本経済新聞社) - which can be seen in snippet view at Google Books - says that on 21st August 1957 Taiyodo Koki was reorganized as a joint-stock company and changed to its current trade name (the Beauty Camera Company).

An article in the 23rd March 1957 edition of "Army Times" described Taiyodo Koki's plans for the manufacture and distribution of new models, and specifically a shift from TLRs to 35mm rangefinder cameras. The plans described were fully delivered over the following year, and by December 1957 the manufacturer had adopted a new name - the Beauty Camera Company ビューティカメラ㈱) - to match that of their products, as did many other better known companies of the time (such as Canon, Minolta, Nikon).

In the early 1960s, the Beauty Lightomatic III was imported into the UK by Dixons. The last camera produced by the Beauty Camera Company was the 1963 Lightmatic SP. However, Camera Taiyōdō remained in business, at the same Jinbōchō Crossing shop, until 30 June 2013. Their closure was immortalised by numerous camera collecting Japanese bloggers

Camera Taiyōdō is known to have operated other shops at various times, including Terminal 1 of Narita International Airport, the Tokyu Hotel, and another store at Shijuku Station in Tokyo. Today there are still shops in Japan that trade under the name Camera Taiyōdō, but it is not known whether they have any connection to the original Tokyo store.

== Taiyōdō Kōki models ==
Listed by type in date order

for 17.5mm film

- Meteor
- Vestkam
- Epochs
- Beauty 14

for 16mm film

- Spy 16
- Beauty 16

6×6 TLRs

- Beauty Flex (with geared-lens focusing & red-window frame counter/advance)
  - Original with no type number (75mm lenses)
  - II (two versions with 75mm and 80mm lenses)
  - IIA
  - IV (early & late versions)
  - V (rebranded as the CSL Photoflex)
- Beauty (Home market version of moving baseboard focusing & mechanical frame counter Beautyflex models)
  - Beauty (version of the Beautyflex S)
  - III S (unique Japan only model with 75mm lenses)
- Beautyflex (Beautyflex written as one word, with moving baseboard focusing & mechanical frame counter)
  - S
  - T (rebranded as the Wardflex model 120, and rebadged as the Gen-flex)
  - 28 (three model variations)
  - K
  - U
  - D (four shutter variations)
    - Copal MX
    - Rectus MX
    - Synchro-MX (rebadged as the Wardflex II, USC Auto Fifty, and rebranded as the SCL Photoflex)
    - Synchro-MXV on Fodorflex rebadge only
- Beautycord (four models offered as lower specification alternatives to the Beautyflexes)

6×6 SLR

- Reflex Beauty I & II

6×6 folders

- Beauty Six (two models)

35mm viewfinder and rangefinder

- Beauty 35 (rebadged as the Gen 35, Milo 35 and Ward 35)
- Beauty 35 Super
- Beauty Canter (F2.8 and F1.9)

== Beauty Camera Company models ==
35mm rangefinders

- Beauty Super II (Varicon S II)
- Beauty Super L (Varicon SL and Super L)
- Beauty Lightomatic/LM
- Beauty Lightomatic II
- Beaumat
- Beauty Lightomatic III/Beauty Lite III
- Beauty Lightmatic SP
