= Gowland =

Gowland is an English surname. Notable people with the surname include:

- Daniel Gowland (1798–1883), English merchant and banker
- Don Gowland (born 1940), Australian sports shooter
- Gibson Gowland (1877–1951), English film actor
- Lance Gowland (1935–2008), Australian activist
- Peter Gowland (1916–2010), American photographer and actor
- Ralph Gowland (c. 1722 – c. 1782), British politician
- Sam Gowland (born 1995), English television personality
- Thomas Gowland (1768–1833), English trader
- Tony Gowland (born 1945), English track cyclist
- William Gowland (1842–1922), English mining engineer
- Frederick Gowland Hopkins (1861–1947), English biochemist
