= Okaya Optical =

Japanese manufacturer of optical products

Okaya Optical Co., Ltd. (岡谷光学機械株式会社; Okaya Kōgaku Kikai Kabushiki Gaisha) was the manufacturer in the 1950s of "Lord" cameras, "Vista" binoculars, and other optical products.
