= Vincent Joseph Dunker =

Vincent Joseph Dunker (December 6, 1878 – March 11, 1974) was a photographer, inventor and camera manufacturer who began his career in Ste. Genevieve, Missouri in the late 1890s. Dunker built a wide variety of cameras, contact printers, photo enlargers, and photo booths over a period of thirty-seven years. In 1924 he began production of his specialty, long roll film cameras intended for taking photos of high school students for yearbooks and individual sale. By the time Dunker built his last camera in 1961 such annual school photography had become routine in high schools throughout the U.S.

== Biography ==
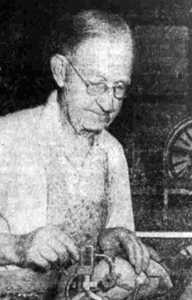
Vincent Joseph Dunker

Vincent was born on December 6, 1878, in Highland, Missouri, to Mary Rosella Guyot who had immigrated from France to the United States. Vincent's father was Henry Dunker Jr. who had been born in Germany. Vincent was baptized at the St. Boniface Church in Perrville, Missouri where his parents resided. After finishing high school, Vincent worked as a blacksmith and carpenter. He then studied photography, obtaining a master's degree from the Illinois College of Photography in Effingham, Illinois.

In the late 1890s Vincent moved to Ste. Genevieve, Missouri, and opened a photography studio. He soon became well known as outstanding in portrait photography and photographer of historical buildings. In addition to operating a portrait studio, Vincent took many photos of the city of Ste. Genevieve and in 1900 published a small booklet of photos titled Souvenir Letter, Ste. Genevieve, Mo.

On Oct 28, 1902, Vincent married Ottie May Boyer, also of Ste. Genevieve. On April 8, 1911, Vincent opened a new studio at 203 Broadway in the Grissom (Calhoon) building in Cape Girardeau, Missouri. On April 19, 1911, Vincent's wife Ottie arrived from Ste. Genevieve with their daughter Majella and they moved into a home on North Fountain Street in Cape Girardeau.

In 1937, Vincent leased his photography studio in order to devote his time fully to the construction of cameras.

In 1955, Vincent sold his studio portrait business to Betty Schwent Donze of Ste. Genevieve. After thirty-seven years of camera production at the age of 82, Vincent built his last camera in 1961, a 70 mm model made for his friend Clem Donze of Ste. Genvieve. Vincent Dunker died in 1974 at the age of 96 in Ste. Genevieve.

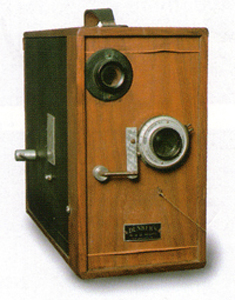
Vincent's last camera

== VE-JA-DE cameras ==
In 1924, Vincent built his first 35 mm long-roll camera which he intended to use for taking school pictures, but another photographer bought the camera from him for $100 (about $1,300 in 2012 dollars). He made a second camera, but quickly sold it also. As a result, he dropped the idea of becoming a school photographer and instead began building cameras for sale under the name VE-JA-DE Products (from his initials, V.J.D.). They are the first documented mass-produced cameras specifically designed for school photography, starting a trend that has spread to high schools throughout the U.S. Vincent hand built all his cameras from walnut that he selected himself. Many of the parts such as the rollers and various aluminum pieces were also handmade. One of those cameras is now in the George Eastman House (Kodak) Museum in Rochester, New York. Another camera is in the Vaughn-Applegate Collection of the Shiloh Museum of Ozark History in Springdale, Arkansas. Two others are in the DigiCamHistory.Com collection. Photos of eighteen different variations of Dunker cameras may be seen on the DigiCamHistory.Com web site, 1950s page, Vincent Joseph Dunker.

Many of Dunker's cameras were 35 mm, but he also made at least three different models of 70 mm long roll film cameras. One used an external apparatus for focusing and another uses an internal system. According to those who worked with him, production over the years was fairly evenly divided between 35 mm and 70 mm model cameras. During World War II Vincent sold many hundreds of his cameras to the U.S. Army for use in making IDs, photos of recruits, photos of war prisoners, etc.

== Other VE-JA-DE products ==
In 1926, Vincent filed for a patent on a contact printer that is somewhat similar in design to the many contact printers sold by Kodak in the 1930s and 1940s, but rather than making one contact print at a time, the Dunker printer was designed to use a long roll of contact paper inside along with strips of negatives on top of the printer to produce contact prints in a much more rapid manner than other contact printers of the time. His contact printer was sold throughout the United States as well as overseas. Dunker also designed and sold a photo booth of the type whereby direct prints could be made for customers in a few minutes and he manufactured at least three different models of photo enlargers.

== Recognition and archived materials ==
On May 22, 1983, the Missouri Cultural Heritage Center presented a Vincent J. Dunker exhibition in Ste. Genevieve: "Vincent J. Dunker Views Ste. Genevieve". The exhibition included several Dunker cameras and numerous early photographs of Ste. Genevieve taken by Vincent.

Dunker built a wide variety of cameras, contact printers and photo enlargers over a period of thirty-seven years. Many of his cameras were specifically designed for making high school photos for yearbooks and school photos for student purchase. He is the first documented mass-builder of such cameras in the U.S. As such, he can be considered the father of what is now a nationwide industry. Camera brochures, photographs of cameras and other Dunker materials are in the archives of the University of Missouri

== Production and current availability ==
In the mid-1950s Vincent sold a number of his long-roll film school cameras to Bremson Photo industries of Kansas City which replaced the Dunker nameplates with Bremson nameplates. Leo Pruneau, Vincent's grandson who worked with Vincent from 1948 through 1958, states that production was about 300 units per year in 1948, declining down to about 150 units per year by 1958. Both Dunker and Bremson nameplate cameras are commonly available on eBay.

== Other activities ==
Vincent loved quail hunting and was an avid fly fisherman. He was also a talented musician and played the trombone for many years with the Ste. Genevieve Municipal Band.
