= Velbon =

Velbon Corporation
- Industry: Photographic accessories and tripods
- Founded: 11 March 1955
- Key people: Ken Nakatani (President & CEO)
- Website: velbon.net

Velbon (full name: Velbon Tripod Co., Ltd.) is a manufacturer of photographic accessories, specialising in tripods. The company is based in Japan. It was established in 1955 as Mitsuboshi Co., Ltd.

The trademark "Velbon" was registered in 1958. The company name is a combination of Japanese pronunciation of 'very' and the French: bon, lit. 'good'.

== Products ==
Velbon produces tripods, monopods, tripod heads, and other stands and accessories for cameras, video cameras, and smartphones.

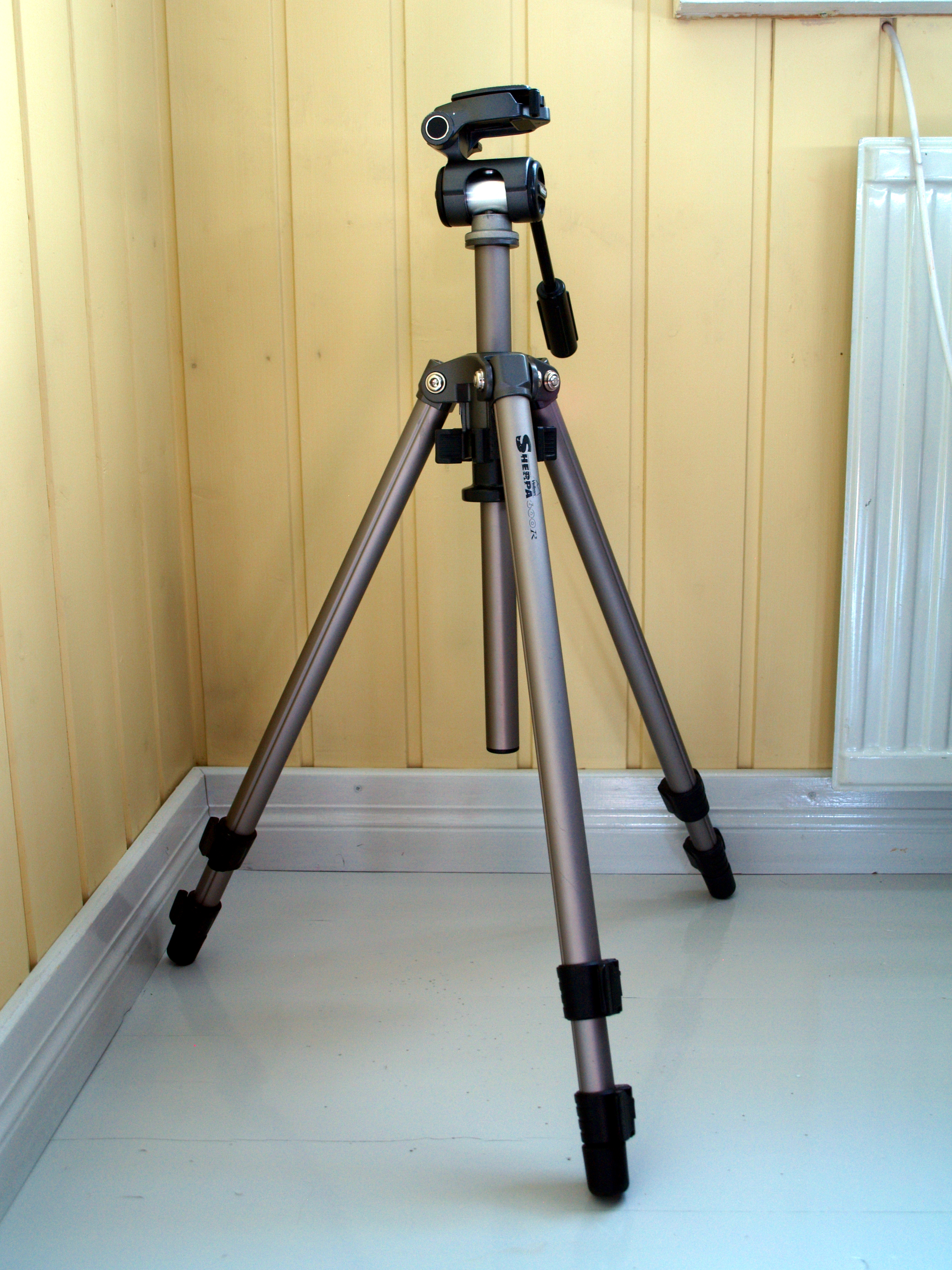
Velbon Sherpa 600R camera tripod

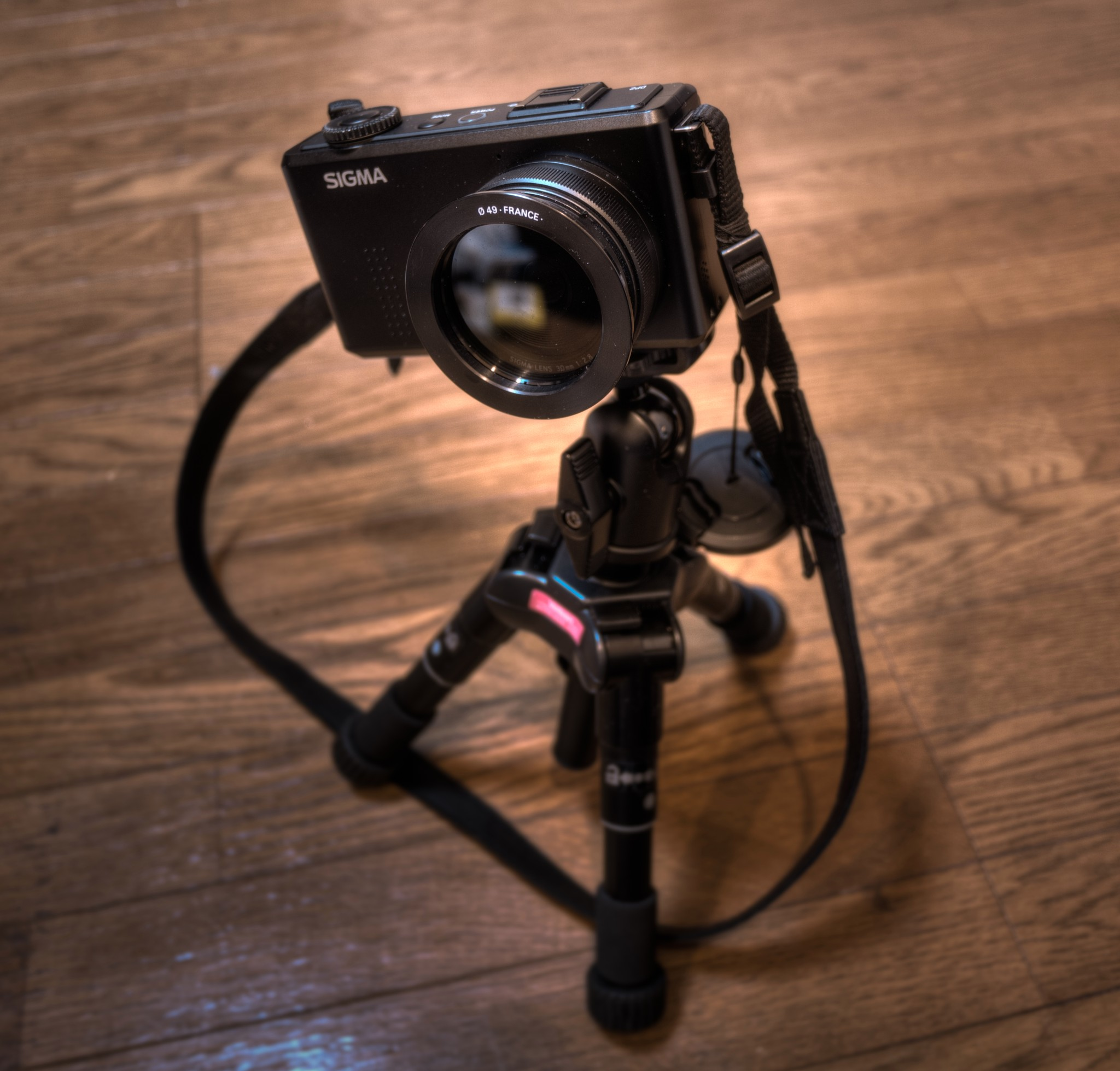
Velbon mini tripod

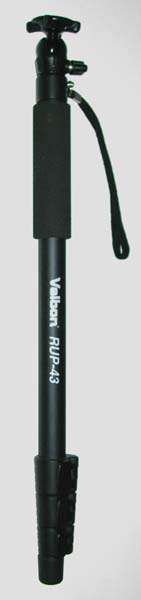
Velbon RUP-43 monopod

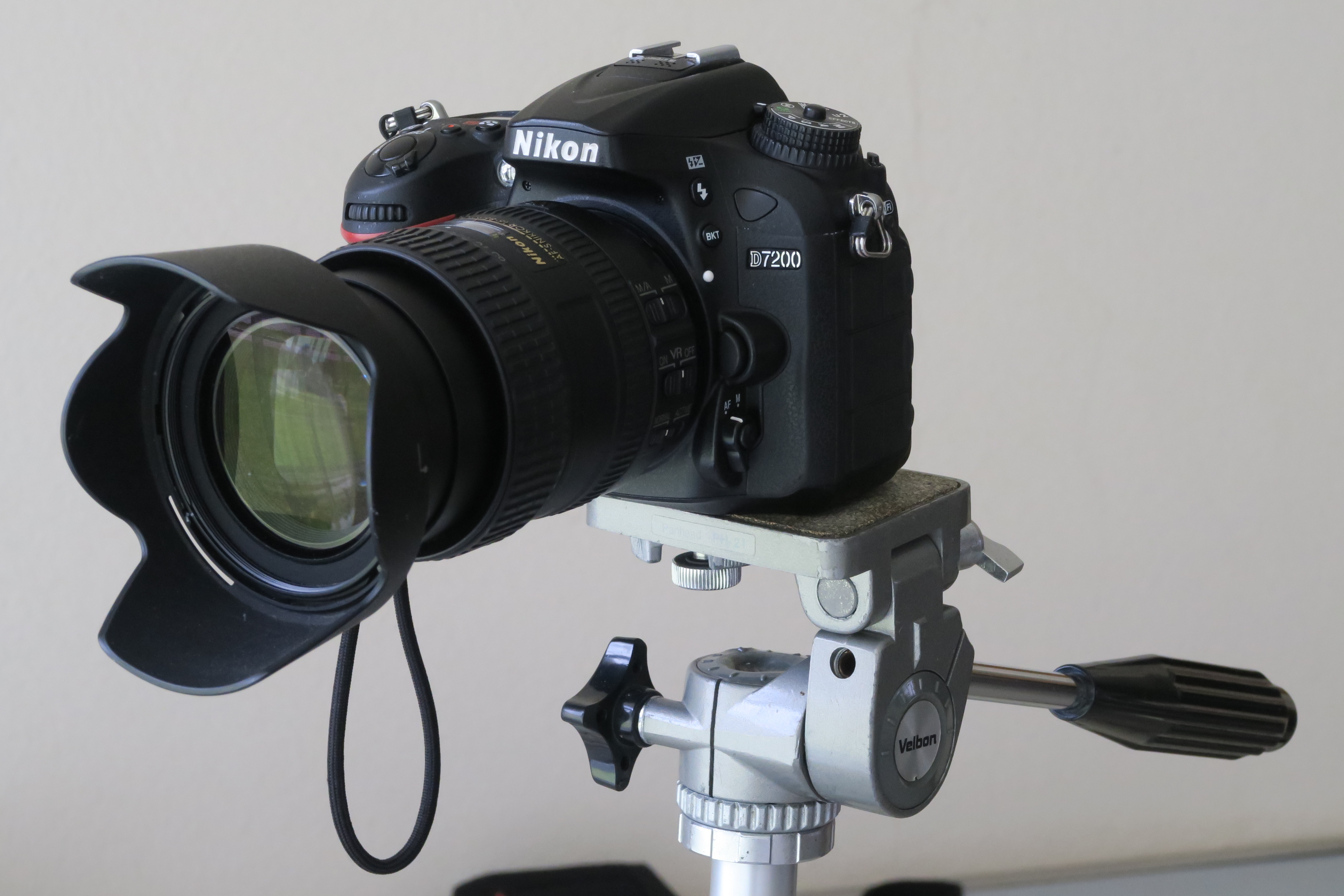
Velbon pan/tilt converter

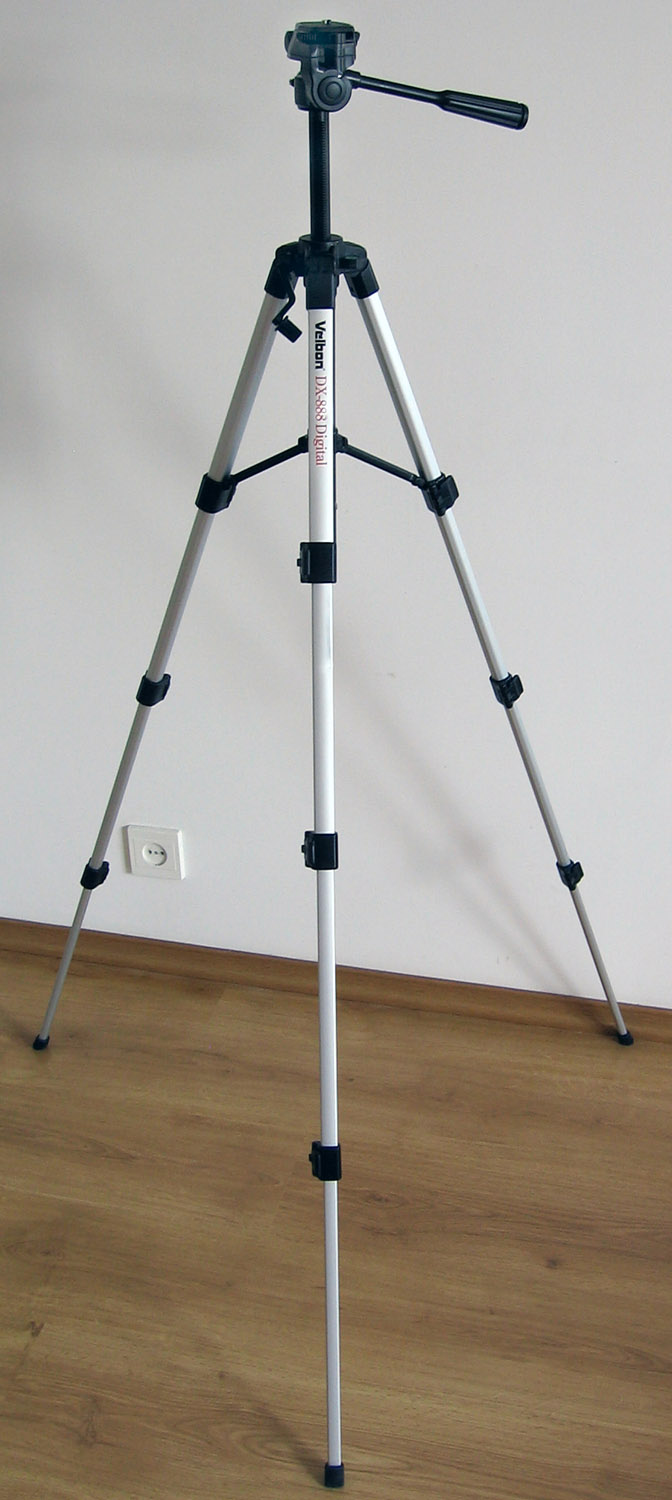
Velbon DX-888 Digital tripod

== Factories ==
The manufacturer has a factory in Myanmar. It also opened factories in Taiwan and Japan over the years. Its former factory in Akeno, Yamanashi, Japan, was purchased and became an artists' space in 2020.
