= Micro Precision Products =

British optical company

MPP logo

Micro Precision Products Ltd (MPP) was a British optical company that between 1941 and 1982 produced cameras and related equipment. (From 1976, its name was MPP Photographic Products Ltd.)

MPP was formed in 1941 to sell equipment produced by Celestion Ltd.; in its early days, MPP employees also worked for Celestion or the related McMurdo Instrument Company. MPP was based in London: in Kingston until 1976, Wandsworth thereafter.

== Products ==
MPP's first major product was the Micro-Technical Camera, in 1948. This was far in advance of any other camera produced in Britain. Mark II followed in 1949; Mark III in 1951; Marks VI, VII and VIII in 1952, 1956, and 1963. (Marks IV and V were not sold.) These had the full versatility and quality of technical cameras; some long remained in professional use.

The Micro-Press Camera was a press camera available through the 1950s.

MPP is the only postwar British manufacturer of twin-lens reflex cameras. The Microcord (1951) was based on the Rolleicord; it was soon (1952) followed by the Microcord Mk II, with an improved shutter (the German Prontor). The Ross lens is of high quality. In 1958, MPP brought out the lever-wound Microflex, inspired by the Rolleiflex. This had excellent optics (by Taylor, Taylor and Hobson) and the camera was well made, but the crank invited hard use for which it was not designed. Shortly after its introduction, Britain dropped the high duty rates that had made Rollei equipment prohibitively expensive, and the Microflex had to be heavily discounted.

Other products included enlargers (even for large format), projectors, dark slides, carrying cases and a flashgun that was similar in design and appearance to Graflex models.

== Sources ==
- Skinner, Basil. Micro Precision Products: The MPP story and the products. Newquay, Cornwall: MPP Publications, 2004. ISBN 0-9546070-1-5. (For a description of the book, see this page, retrieved in 2007 from the website of Michael Pritchard FRPS.)
