= Silvestri camera =

Italian professional camera manufacturer

Silvestri is an Italian manufacturer of professional photographic cameras and large format cameras.

== The history - SLV and T30 ==
SLV camera (1982).

The production of the Silvestri cameras started in Florence, Italy, at the beginning of the eighties by the work of Vincenzo Silvestri who designed and developed the original project. The intent was to provide photographers of architecture, indoor and outdoor, with a wide-angle camera that was compact and light-weight, compared to the large view cameras produced in that period, and with the essential movements for perspective correction.

The first camera, the SLV, was born with the 6X7 / 6X9 format, with a rotating back with click stop every 90 degrees and the lens, a Super Angulon 5,6/47 mm in focusing helical mount by Schneider, was not interchangeable. The shift mechanism permitted a total rise or fall of 25 mm, it consisted of a control knob and two counter-posed screws right/left and allowed a precise setting and locking of the shift. The attachment of the roll film back was Graflex compatible which opened the system to the application of various backs like Mamiya, Horseman, Wista, etc. The image viewing and the focusing were made on the round glass using a magnifying lens in a leather bellows. The whole camera structure was made in anodized aluminum and worked with CNC machinery, ensuring constructive exactness and reliability.

From a conceptual point of view, the SLV camera is allowed to shift in any direction by simply placing and leveling the back horizontally or vertically and by orienting the camera body by leaning it to the right or left, or upwards or upside down. Some samples of this first model were made in an almost handcrafted way but meeting a good interest among the specialized photographers, Silvestri was pushed to develop a new and improved model of SLV.

This second model had a bayonet for attaching the lenses and an interchangeable system for the backs. This gave the SLV a major extension and flexibility and the range of lenses grew to 3 Schneider Schneider lenses: Super Angulon 5,6/65 mm, Super Angulon 5,6/75 mm and Symmar 5,6/100 mm, beside the Super Angulon 5,6/47 mm, all lenses had a bayonet attachment and a focusing helical mount. The interchangeable backs allowed to insertion of the extension rings to compensate for the difference in focal distance among the various lenses. The 4 points of 8° attachment, quick and precise to use, also accept backs of different formats like the 6x12cm and the 4x5”.

These modifications opened to the SLV new fields of application and attracted other photographers from Italy and abroad. The SLV was substituted by the T30 camera in 1997, The T30, having 30 mm of shift movement, was more suitable to the new lenses with lager image circle that were introduced on the market in that period. The T30 is still in production.

A further step towards flexibility of use consists in the design and production of the shiftable viewfinder with interchangeable frames. The viewfinder is extremely useful for quick work and in difficult work situations compared to viewing the image on the ground glass.

== Mod.H ==
A new concept camera that renews the characteristics of the SLV, using most of its accessories, has the shiftable viewfinder embodied which coupled with the shift movement gives operative easiness and simplicity of use. The lens-format frames are interchangeable, starting from the Schneider series the including the Rodenstock one too. The camera is now out of production.

== S4 ==
The S4 camera was designed later to answer the need for full coverage of the 4x5 inches format, whereas the SLV camera could not give enough versatility with this format. Standard 4x5 inches back with format adapters for 6x9 and 6x12, interchangeable backs with short rotation attachment 8° and bayonet attachment or interchangeable lens boards for the lenses. Large in dimension, it is later provided with front bellows (Flexibellow) that perform the lens focusing, tilting, and swinging. With this accessory, the lenses can be used without a focusing mount and permitted the focus extension on the two orthogonal axes by using the lens tilting and swinging. The S4 camera is still in production.

== Bicam ==
With the arrival of digital photography and considering that it would substitute le film in a short time, Silvestri began to study a camera able to face the double need of working with film but at the same time can be converted back to digital applications. There were two possible solutions, the scan backs and the matrix ones. The choice selected the matrix backs, creating a compact, easy-to-carry, proportioned to the small size of the high-resolution sensors. Two series of Rodenstock and Schneider lenses, from the 23 mm to the long focal ones, specifically designed for high-resolution digital photography are its range of lenses. The Bicam introduced in the late nineties was added with new accessories and components so to follow the continuous evolution of the sensors’ technology. Its main characteristics are the possibility to work with lenses mounted in helical focusing mount and bayonet, or with a bellows system which adds to the camera all the necessary correction movements typical of view cameras; side shift, rise and fall, tilt and swing; all movements are extremely precise and micrometric. The reversible and interchangeable backs have a large range of accessories, from the sliding adapters with viewing screens and drop-in plates to interface the most popular digital backs: Hasselblad V, Hasselblad H, Mamiya 645, Contax 645, Rollei AFI.

== S5 Micron ==
S5 micron camera with sliding back adapter for high resolution digital backs (2006).

Classical view camera. Designed for studio photography, it has full micrometric movements. All the parts related to lenses and backs are interchangeable. The lenses are on board or bayonet, le lens boards are flat or recessed, and the lenses have no need for a helical focusing mount. The backs and their accessories are in common with the Bicam system. The bellows are interchangeable. The peculiarity of the S5 micron is to be built on two separate shifting blocks that do not interfere between them allowing the two standards to get to touching. This characteristic makes it possible to use extremely wide-angle lenses and to perform adjustment movements otherwise impossible. The S5 camera was published in the ADI Index 2005 for the industrial design award the Compasso d'Oro.

== Flexicam ==
Award winner for the best project at the Premio Vespucci 2008. This camera was conceived for on-location works, lightweight (less than 1 kg.), and with absolute precision for the use of high-resolution digital backs. It offers the flexibility of a mini view camera having the same essential correction movements. Rise and fall, rail extension with the micrometric movement of the focus, tilt, and swing. Rodenstock and Schneider lenses on Silvestri bayonet, from 23 mm to 120 mm, back adapter for high-resolution digital backs, T attachment for SLR cameras.

== Camera models and the year of their introduction ==
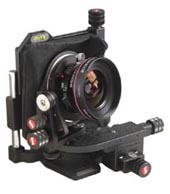
Flexicam camera (2006).

- Silvestri SLV – 1982
- Silvestri SG612 – 1990
- Silvestri Mod. H – 1992
- Silvestri S4 – 1995
- Silvestri T30 – 1997
- Silvestri Bicam – 1998
- Silvestri S5 micron – 2005
- Silvestri Flexicam – 2006

== General references ==
- ADI Design Index 2005, Editrice Compositori, 2005 Bologna. ISBN 88-7794-518-4
- L'Ottica in Toscana, Nardini Editore, 2005 Firenze. ISBN 88-404-0105-9
- Alla Photokina e ritorno, Photographialibri, 2008 Milano. ISBN 978-88-87437-05-8
- Shutterbug, n.3 vol.33 January 2004, article "Medium format update" by George Schaub, pages 100-114.
- FV Foto-Video Actualidad, n.50 1992, article "Una càmara poco corriente" by Valentìn Sama, pages 60–66.
- PHOTO Technique International, n.1 1996, article "Primarily for architecture" by Hans Bluth, pages 10–11.
- PHOTO Technik International, n.1 1994, article " Kamerakonzept fur die Architekturfotografie" by W.D. Georg, pages 48–51.
