= List of digital camera brands =

This is a list of digital camera brands. Former and current brands are included in this list. With some of the brands, the name is licensed from another company, or acquired after the bankruptcy of an older photographic equipment company. The actual manufacture of a camera model is performed by a different company in many cases. In many cases brands are limited to certain countries. Not all brands of devices that can take digital images are listed here, including many industrial digital camera brands, some webcam brands, brands of cell phones that feature cameras, and brands of video cameras that can take digital stills. Defunct brands are listed separately.

== Active consumer camera brands ==
As of January 2025, these brands offer some combination of compact digital cameras, bridge camera, digital single-lens reflex cameras (DSLRs), and mirrorless interchangeable lens cameras (MILCs):

Brand	Country	Notes
Advert Tech	China	Closed Circuit Television Camera (CCTV) - IP Camera. Ranging from megapixel quality cameras to High Definition Cameras. It also goes by the name of Advert CCTV
AgfaPhoto	Germany	Compact digital cameras
Aigo	China	Compact digital cameras
Akaso	China	Compact digital cameras
Bell & Howell	United States	Compact digital cameras
BenQ	Taiwan	Compact digital cameras, bridge digital cameras
Blackmagic Design	Australia	Digital video cameras, pro and consumer
Canon	Japan	Ixus and PowerShot compact digital cameras, Vixia camcorders, EOS M MILC and Digital EOS/Digital Rebel DSLRs
DJI	China	Drones, action cameras, digital cinema cameras
Flashback	Australia	Compact digital cameras designed to mimic the experience of a film camera
Foscam	China	IP Cameras
Fujifilm	Japan	FinePix compact digital cameras and X-series MILCs
GE	United States	Name licensed by General Imaging; Compact digital cameras, bridge digital cameras
Genius	Taiwan	Compact digital cameras
GoPro	United States	Highly compact personal-use rugged action cameras
Hasselblad	Sweden	Medium format cameras (H System); mirrorless medium-format cameras (X System); lenses; multi-shot digital backs; photographic equipment
HP	United States	Compact digital cameras manufactured by VistaQuest Corp.
Insta360	China	Action cameras, 360-degree cameras
ISAW	South Korea	Action cameras and camera microphones
Kinefinity	China	Digital Cinema and broadcast cameras
Kodak	United States	Manufactured by JK Imaging; compact digital cameras, bridge digital cameras
Kron Technologies	Canada	Affordable high-speed cameras
Leica	Germany	Compact digital cameras, DSLRs, MILCs, and rangefinder cameras
Linkflow	South Korea	Wearable, on-device AI-powered cameras
Lytro	United States	Light field sensing cameras
Medion	Germany	Consumer digital cameras
Memoto	Sweden	Wearable lifelogging camera
Minox	Germany	Compact digital cameras
Nikon	Japan	Nikon Z-mount MILCs, Coolpix compact digital cameras, Nikon 1 series MILCs, and D-series DSLRs
OM System	Japan	C-, D-, FE-series, Tough and Stylus compact digital cameras; E-series DSLRs based on the Four Thirds System; and two series of mirrorless interchangeable-lens cameras based on the Micro Four Thirds System, the PEN digital series and OM-D series（Former Olympus）
Panasonic	Japan	Lumix compact digital cameras and MILCs (Micro Four Thirds and full frame)
PaperShoot	Taiwan	Minimalist digital cameras, focused on sustainability and Candid photography
Pentax	Japan	Optio compact digital camera, K-series DSLRs, Pentax Q MILC, and the 645D medium-format DSL
Phase One	Denmark	Medium-format cameras and digital camera backs
Polaroid	United States	Instant cameras and printers manufactured by Polaroid B.V.
Praktica	Germany	Compact digital cameras
PTZOptics	United States	PTZ cameras, zoom cameras, camera controllers, HIVE Cloud Controller, and accessories
Ricoh	Japan	Caplio and other compact digital cameras and the modular GXR MILC
Rollei	Germany	Compact digital cameras
Samsung	South Korea	Compact digital cameras and NX-series MILCs
Seagull Camera	China	TLR cameras, SLR cameras, folding cameras, CCD and SLR camera lenses, large-format cameras
Sigma	Japan	Compact digital cameras and SD-series DSLRs
Sony	Japan	Cyber-shot compact digital cameras, α DSLRs, Sony NEX MILCs and CineAlta and FX-series digital video cameras and cinema cameras
Tevion	Germany	Compact digital cameras and trail cameras
Thomson	France	Waterproof digital camera
Thinkware	South Korea	Dashcams, action cameras and gimbal cameras
Traveler	Germany	Compact digital cameras
Vageeswari	India	Wooden field camera
VisionTek	Canada	IP Cameras. Ranging from various megapixel and types of cameras. Commercial & Small Business cameras.
Vivitar	United States	Compact digital cameras
Yashica	Hong Kong（Japan）	Film cameras, digital cameras, disposable cameras and night vision goggles
Z CAM	China	Digital Cinema and virtual reality cameras

== Other active brands ==
These brands offer only non-camera digital imaging devices, or non-consumer digital cameras:

- (Germany) ABUS - cameras for surveillance and home security applications
- (China) AEE - action camcorders capable of taking stills
- (Taiwan) Aiptek - camcorders
- (France) Alcatel - cameraphones
- (Switzerland) Alpa - medium format cameras designed for digital backs
- (United States) Apple - cameraphones, tablets and webcams; previously offered QuickTake standalone camera
- (United States) Arecont Vision - HDTV surveillance IP cameras and software
- (United States) Argus (licensed brand name of extinct company)
- (Germany) Arri - Professional Cinema cameras
- AV Future Link Sdn. Bhd. (AVF) - webcams only
- (Sweden) Axis - network cameras / standalone webcams only
- (United States) Better Light - digital scan backs
- (Canada) BlackBerry - cameraphones
- (United States) BuckEye Cam - long range wireless camera systems
- (United States) Bushnell - trail cameras
- (China) BRICA
- (Netherlands) Cambo - large format cameras, architectural cameras and repro cameras designed for digital backs
- (United States) Contour - wearable HD action cams for video and capable of taking stills
- (United States) Covert - trail cameras
- (Singapore) Creative - webcams only; previously offered compact digital cameras
- (United States) Cuddeback - trail cameras
- (Taiwan) D-Link - IP cameras
- (United States) EarthCam - webcams only
- (Taiwan) Emprex
- (United States) Freefly - High speed cameras and drones
- (China) Fotoman - medium format cameras designed for digital backs
- (United States) GoPro - action/helmet camcorder capable of taking stills
- (Japan) Horseman - medium format cameras designed for digital backs.It is marketed by Kenko Professional Imaging (KPI) Inc.
- (Taiwan) HTC - cameraphones, tablets
- (China) Huawei - cameraphones, tablets
- (United States) Hunten - trail cameras
- (Taiwan) iPUX - IP cameras
- (United States) IQinVision - IP cameras
- (United States) iX Cameras - High speed camera manufacturer
- (Malaysia) Jaga - compact digital cameras
- (Germany) Jenoptik - industrial optical products; previously offered compact digital cameras
- (Japan) JVC - camcorders capable of taking stills; previously offered compact digital cameras
- (Germany) Kaiser - scanning cameras
- (United States) Ken-A-Vision - document cameras and digital microscopes offers a built-in digital cameras
- (Lithuania) KUROKESU - Industrial cameras, USB webcameras
- (Israel) Leaf - digital camera backs
- (China) Lenovo - cameraphones, tablets
- (United States) Leupold - trail cameras
- (South Korea) LG - IP cameras, cameraphones; previously offered compact digital cameras
- (Germany) Linhof - medium format cameras designed for digital backs
- Livelook - webcams only
- (Switzerland) Logitech - webcams only
- (Canada) Lumenera - industrial, scientific, and astronomy cameras
- (Singapore) Mercury - smartphones; previously offered compact digital cameras
- (United States) Microsoft - LifeCam series
- (Germany) Minox - toy and spy digital cameras, and compact digital cameras
- Micro Innovations
- (Germany) Mobotix - IP cameras
- (United States) Motorola - cameraphones
- (United States) Moultrie - trail cameras
- (Taiwan) Mustek Systems - camcorders capable of taking stills; previously offered compact digital cameras
- (Finland) Nokia - cameraphones
- Ocuview - webcam
- (United States) Oncam Grandeye - IP cameras
- (United States) Oregon Scientific - action/helmet camcorders; previously offered compact digital cameras
- (United States) Panoscan - digital panoramic rotating line cameras
- (South Korea) Pantech - cameraphones
- (Germany) Pentacon - scanning cameras
- (Netherlands) Philips - cameraphones and webcams; previously offered compact digital cameras
- (Taiwan) Premier
- (United States) Primos - trail cameras
- (United States) RCA - camcorders capable of taking stills; previously offered compact digital cameras
- (United States) Reconyx - trail cameras
- (United States) RED - Digital cinema cameras
- (Germany) Rencay - digital scan backs
- (South Korea) Samyang Optics - photographic lenses: autofocus lenses, manual focus lenses, DSLRs, cinema lenses (also under Xeen brand)
- (Australia) ScoutGuard - trail cameras
- (United States) Sea & Sea - underwater housings for DSLRs and MILCs; previously offered compact digital cameras
- (China) Seagull Camera - compact cameras
- (Switzerland) Seitz - digital panorama cameras
- (Japan) Sharp - cameraphones; previously offered camcorders capable of taking stills
- (Italy) Silvestri - medium and large format cameras for traditional and digital photography.
- (Switzerland) Sinar - medium-format cameras and digital camera backs
- (Germany) Soligor
- (Canada) Spypoint - trail cameras
- Suprema
- (Australia) Swann - IP cameras and trail cameras
- (Netherlands) Trust
- (Japan) Toshiba - camcorders capable of taking stills; previously offered compact digital cameras
- (United States) Uway - trail cameras
- (United States) Vision Research - High speed digital cameras, Marketed under the "Phantom" brand.
- (Japan) Wista - view cameras designed for digital backs.
- (United States) Wildgame - trail cameras and action cameras
- (Indonesia) JETE - Webcam
- (Indonesia) Advan - Smartphones
- (Russia) Zenit - Announced that it was resuming camera and lens production for the M-mount, as well as for unspecified Nikon and Canon mounts in 2019
- (China) Bosma - Digital cinema cameras

== Defunct brands ==
These brands no longer produce digital imaging products:

- Apple - compact digital camera
- Acer - compact digital cameras
- Autographer, OMG Life - wearable digital camera
- Chinon - one early digital camera
- Casio - Exilim compact digital cameras
- Concord - compact digital cameras
- Cool-iCam - compact digital cameras
- Contax - produced one DSLR, several high quality SLR and galileian viewfinder models and two compact digital cameras
- CyberPix
- Epson - Japan-only digital rangefinder camera; previously offered compact digital cameras
- Gateway - compact digital cameras
- Hitachi - camcorders capable of taking stills; previously offered compact digital cameras
- HP Photosmart - compact digital cameras; left market in November 2007
- Imacon - digital camera backs; purchased by Hasselblad
- Intel - produced one compact digital camera
- Konica - compact digital cameras
- Konica Minolta - compact digital cameras and DSLRs; assets relating to digital imaging were transferred to Sony in 2006
- Kyocera - as of 2005, only cameraphones; previously offered compact digital cameras
- Largan - compact digital cameras
- LG - compact digital cameras
- Minolta - compact digital cameras and two unique DSLRs, acquired by Sony in early 21st century
- Mamiya - medium-format cameras which accept digital camera backs
- Maxell - compact digital cameras
- Microtek - compact digital cameras
- Nintendo - Game Boy Camera - no longer offers digital camera accessory
- Nytech - compact digital cameras
- Premo - made cameras in the 1800s. Bought out by Kodak in the early 1900s
- Sanyo - compact digital cameras
- SiPix - compact digital cameras
- UMAX - compact digital cameras
- Voigtländer - fixed-lens film cameras
- Yakumo - compact digital cameras
- Mnyaga - compact digital cameras
- Toyo-View - view cameras designed for digital backs.（Sakai Machine Tool Co., Ltd.）

== See also ==
- List of photographic equipment makers
- Camera
- Digital single-lens reflex camera
- History of the camera
