= A830 =

A830 may refer to:

- A830, a point-and-shoot digital camera manufactured by General Imaging
- A830 road, Scotland

== See also ==
- A380 (disambiguation)
