= Medium format =

Film format

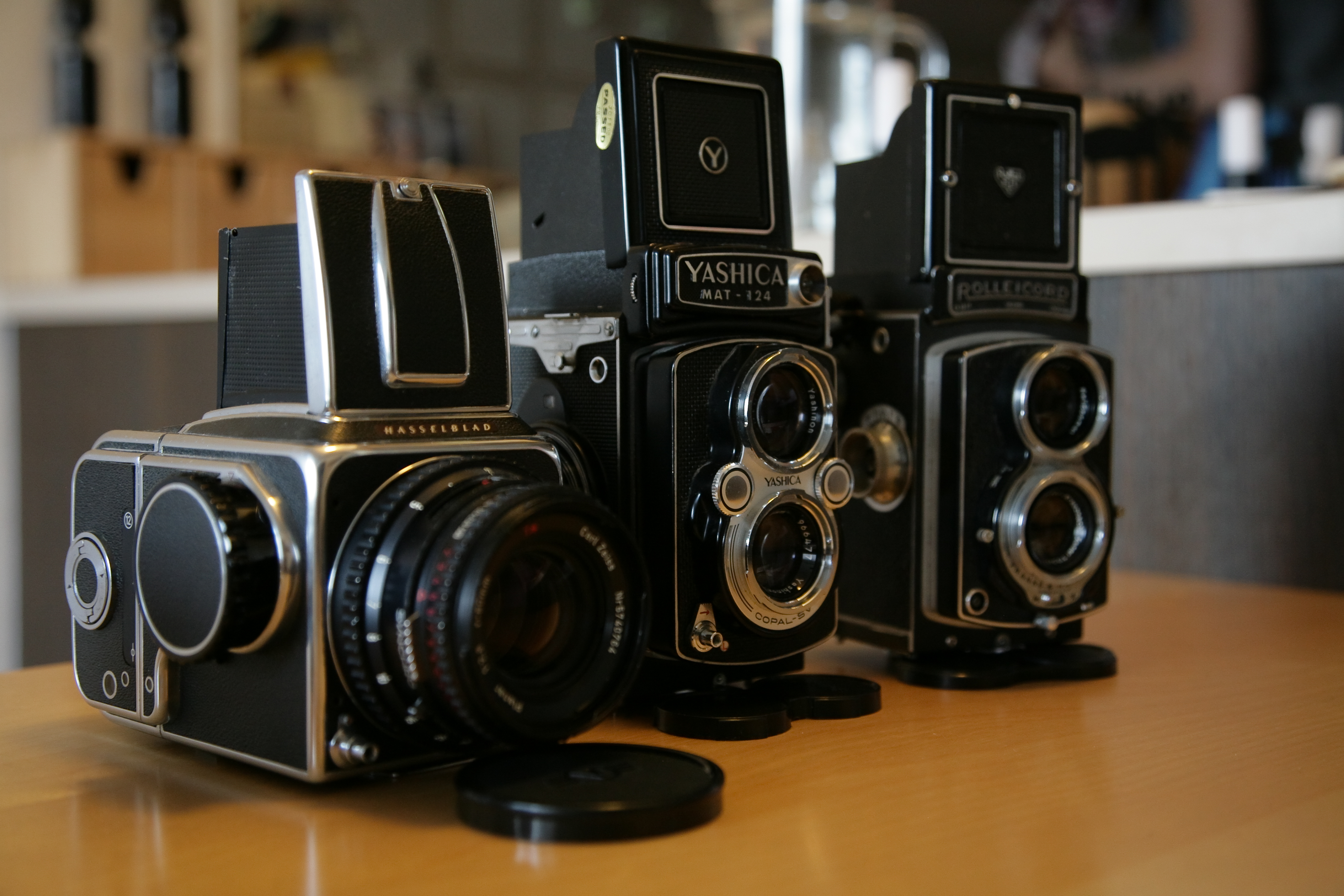
Popular examples of medium format film cameras: Hasselblad 500C/M, Yashica Mat 124, Rolleicord IV

Medium format has traditionally referred to a film format in photography and the related cameras and equipment that use film. Nowadays, the term applies to film and digital cameras that record images on media larger than the 24 mm × 36 mm (0.94 in × 1.42 in) used in 35 mm photography (though not including 127 film), but smaller than 4 in × 5 in (100 mm × 130 mm) (which is considered large format photography).

In digital photography, medium format refers either to cameras adapted from medium-format film photography uses or to cameras making use of sensors larger than that of a 35 mm film frame. The benefits of using medium-format digital cameras include higher resolution sensors, better low-light capabilities compared to a traditional 35mm DSLR, and a wider dynamic range.

== Characteristics ==
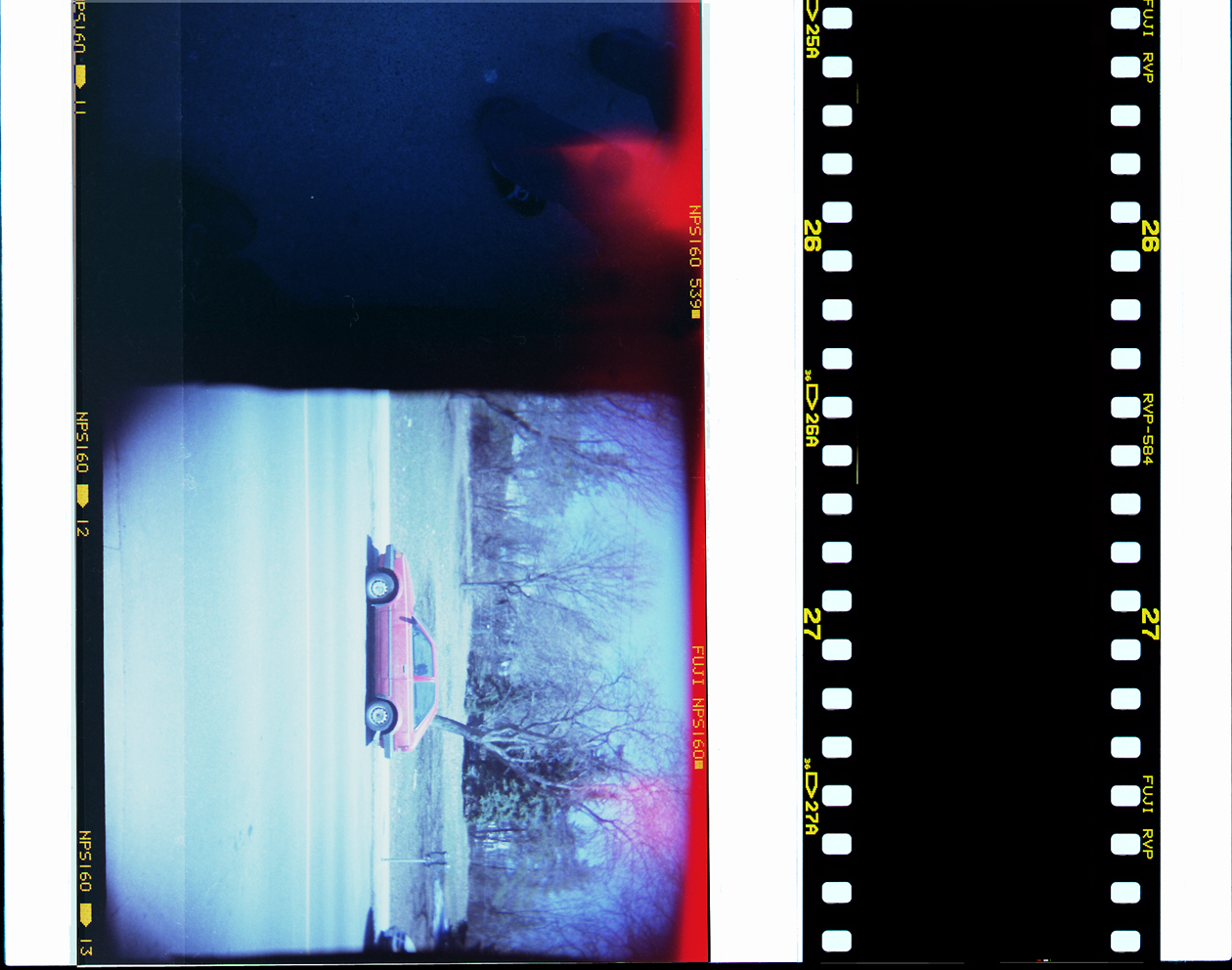
A size comparison of medium-format film (left) and 35 mm film. Medium-format film lacks the sprocket holes of 35 mm film.

Buzz Aldrin on the moon, photographed by Neil Armstrong onto double-perforated 70mm film with a Hasselblad camera

Medium-format cameras made since the 1950s are generally less automated than smaller cameras made at the same time. For example, autofocus became available in consumer 35 mm cameras in 1977, but did not reach medium format until the late 1990s, and has never been available in a consumer large format camera.

The main benefit of medium-format photography is that, because of the larger size of the film or digital sensor (two to six times larger than 35 mm), images of much higher resolution can be produced. This allows for bigger enlargements and smooth gradation without the grain or blur that would characterize similarly enlarged images produced from smaller film formats. The larger size of the film also allows for better control of the depth of field and therefore more photographic creativity.

Cameras with a bellows typically support 'tilt and shift' of the lens. This permits landscape photography with the appearance of an extremely large depth of field – from closest foreground to the far horizon – to be achieved, by aligning the plane of focus with the subject plane of interest, using the Scheimpflug principle.

Compared with 35 mm, the main drawbacks are accessibility and price. While 35 mm cameras, film, and photo finishing services are generally widely available and inexpensive, medium format is usually limited to professional photography shops and can be prohibitively expensive. Also, medium-format cameras tend to be bulkier than their 35 mm counterparts.

=== Film handling ===
The medium-format film is usually roll film, typically allowing 8 to 32 exposures on one roll of film before reloading is needed. This is fewer than 35 mm cartridges, which typically take 12 to 36 pictures on one roll. This is somewhat offset by the fact that most medium-format systems used interchangeable film magazines, thereby allowing photographers to switch rolls quickly, allowing them larger numbers of exposures before needing to load new film or to change the film type. Some companies had bulk film backs that used 70 mm double-perforated film that allowed up to 75 feet of film to be loaded at one time. While rolls of large format film were produced at one time, their use was specialized, typically for aerial cameras installed in military aircraft or printing industry equipment.

Most large format film is sheet film, that is, film where each picture is on a separate piece of film, requiring that the camera be frequently reloaded, usually after every picture, sometimes using magazines of up to five pictures or reduction backs that allow multiple pictures on a single sheet of film. Medium-format sheet film was produced for some cameras, but these cameras tend to be smaller, lighter, and easier to use than large format gear. Sheet film was never commonly used in cameras smaller than medium format.

Film cost per exposure is directly related to the amount of film used, thus, the larger the film size, the more expensive each picture will be. An 8 by 10 inch large-format negative is far more expensive than a 6 by 6 cm medium-format picture, which is substantially more expensive than a frame of 35 mm film.

35 mm cartridges are generally easier to load and unload from a camera than medium-format rolls. A 35 mm cartridge is placed inside a camera, and in most motorized cameras this is all that is needed; the camera loads the film and rewinds it into the cartridge for removal. Far fewer medium-format cameras are motorized, and medium-format roll film does not have sprocket holes, so loading often requires that marking on the backing paper of the film be lined up with markings on the camera, and on unloading, the backing paper must be carefully secured to protect the film from light.

=== 120, 220 and 620 film ===
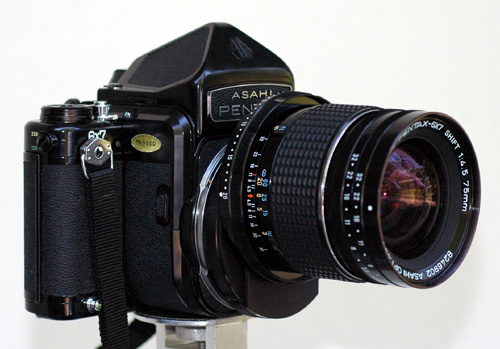
Pentax 6×7 format SLR camera with perspective control lens

All medium-format cameras mass-produced today (as of 2024) use the 120 film format. Additionally, many are capable of using the 220 film format, effectively doubling the number of frames available with 120 film. Medium-format roll film is still available from specialty shops and photographic laboratories, yet it is not as ubiquitous as 135 (35 mm) film.

The 620 format was introduced by Kodak in 1931 as an alternative to 120. It was discontinued in 1995. The 620 format is essentially the same film on a thinner and narrower all-metal spool. While 620 film is required on a number of old Kodak Brownie cameras, many of these cameras can accommodate the slightly larger 120 rolls/spools. In other situations where the camera cannot accommodate a 120 spool, the 120 film can be rolled onto a 620 spool in a darkroom or changing bag.

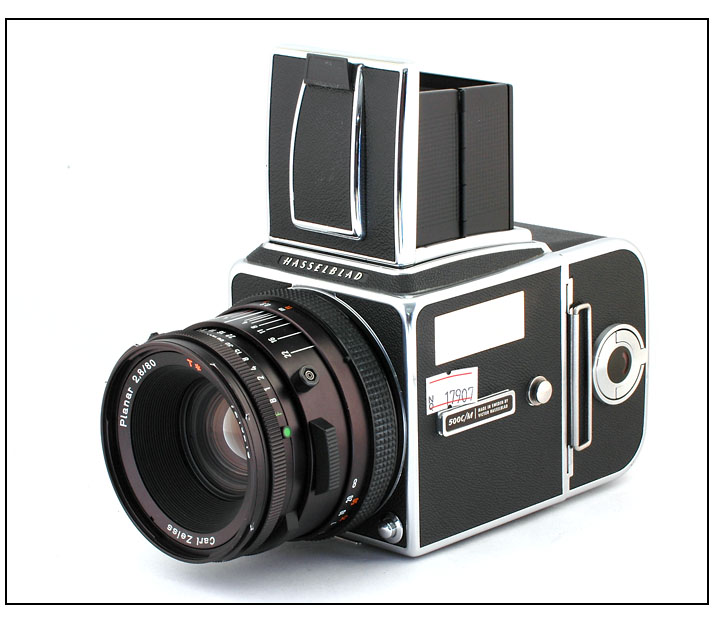
50th anniversary Hasselblad 500 CM classic camera kit

This film is shot in a variety of aspect ratios, which differ depending on the camera or frame insert used. The most common aspect ratios are 6×6 cm (square/1:1) and 6×4.5 cm (rectangular/4:3). Other frequently used aspect ratios are 6×7 cm, 6×9 cm, and 6×17 cm panoramic. The 6×4.5 cm format is usually referred to as "645", with many cameras that use this ratio bearing "645" in their product name. Cameras that can switch to different aspect ratios do so by either switching camera backs, by using a frame insert, or by use of special multi-format backs. All of these dimensions are nominal; actual dimensions are a bit different. For example, 6×7 cm might give an image on film that is actually 56×70 mm; this enlarges exactly to fill an 8×10 inch sheet of paper. Another feature of many medium-format models is the ability to use Polaroid instant film in an interchangeable back. Studio, commercial and architectural photographers value this system for its ability to verify the focus and exposure.

=== 70 mm film – still versus cine ===
For some professional medium-format cameras, those used in school portraiture for example, long-roll film magazines were available. Most of these accommodated rolls of film that were 100 ft (30.5 m) long and 70 mm wide, sometimes with perforations, sometimes without. Some cameras, such as the Hasselblad, could be equipped with film magazines holding 15 foot rolls of double perforated 70 mm film passed between two cassettes. 70 mm was a standard roll film width for many decades, last used as late as the 1960s for 116 and 616 size roll films. It was also used for aerial photo-mapping, and it is still used by large format cinema systems such as IMAX.

70 mm film used in still cameras, like Mamiya and Hasselblad, and 70 mm print film used in IMAX projectors have the same gauge or height as 120 film. With 70 mm cine projector film, the perforations are inset by 2.5 mm to make room for the old-style optical sound tracks; a standard established by Todd-AO in the 1950s. IMAX cameras use 65 mm film, which have perforations and pitch that match-up to the 70 mm film used in IMAX projectors.

== System cameras ==
Mamiya 645 Super and its possible configurations: 1. Camera body; 2. Lenses; 3. Focusing screens; 4. Power drive; 5. Wind-up crank; 6. Metered prism finder; 7. Prism finder; 8. Waist level finder; 9. 120 roll film holder loaded with a film X; 10. 120 roll film holder loaded with a film Y; 11. 220 roll film holder, 35 mm roll film holder, Polaroid land pack film holder, digital back (only for more recent models), etc.; 12. Cable release adapter

Many professional medium-format cameras are system cameras, which means that they have various interchangeable parts. Like most 35 mm single-lens reflex cameras (SLRs), these cameras usually support different lenses, but in addition it is also standard for medium-format system cameras to support different winding mechanisms, viewfinders, and camera backs. This flexibility is one of the primary advantages of medium-format photography.

== Digital medium format ==
Digital photography came to the medium-format world with the development of digital camera backs, which can be fitted to many system cameras. Digital backs are a type of camera back that have electronic sensors in them, effectively converting a camera into a digital camera. These backs are used predominantly by professional photographers. As with film, due to the increased size of the imaging chip (up to twice that of a 35 mm film frame, and thus as much as 40 times the size of the chip in a typical pocket point-and-shoot camera) they deliver more pixels than consumer-grade cameras, and have lower noise. Features like fan cooling also improve the image quality of studio models.

This market began in 1992 when Leaf Systems Inc. released their first digital camera back (4 Megapixels), named the "DCB" (often described as 'a brick'). Initially mounted on Sinar Studio cameras, the camera backs were later moved to medium-format units. By the late 1990s, a number of companies produced digital camera backs of various types.

In the 2000s, the number of vendors of both high-end medium-format camera systems and digital backs began to decrease. The performance of digital SLRs cut into the sale of film-based medium-format systems, while the tremendous development expenses for medium-format digital systems meant that not all vendors could profitably compete. Contax and Bronica ceased production of cameras, Kodak stopped making their DCS series of backs, and camera and back manufacturers began to integrate.

Camera maker Hasselblad merged with digital imaging firm Imacon and partnered with Fuji to design and produce a new line of digital-friendly medium-format cameras, the H-Series. Since the manufacturer plans to sell digital backs integrated with the camera, other makers of digital backs are less likely to be able to sell backs for this camera.

Camera maker Mamiya developed the 22MP Mamiya ZD in 2004, the first medium format DSLR. It also developed a ZD digital back but announced a partnership with back maker Phase One. Camera maker Sinar was taken over in stages by the digital camera back manufacturer and developer Jenoptik, and partnered with Rollei for the development of the Hy6 medium-format camera systems. DHW Fototechnik presented at Photokina 2012 an updated version of the Hy6, called the Hy6 Mod2.

The Leaf Aptus 75S digital back offers 33MP resolution, with a shooting speed of 50 frames a minute. In early 2006 Hasselblad (H2D and H3D) and Phase One (P45) released a 39 megapixel back. In 2008, Phase One announced the P65+, a 60 megapixel back, the highest resolution single-shot digital back at that time (2008). Phase One continues to dominate high end non-interpolated imaging with the largest market share. Sinar continues to provide its primary Digital View Camera system while still supporting the HY6 medium format with a new platform independent eSprit 65 LV digital camera back. On 20 September 2010, Leaf released a 80MP digital back, the Aptus-II 12. The Leaf Aptus-II 12's sensor size of 53.7 mm × 40.3 mm is 92% of the area of a 56 mm × 41.5 mm standard-sized 6 × 4.5 frame, 69% of a 56 mm × 56 mm square-sized 6 × 6 frame, and 45% of the area of a 56 mm × 84 mm 6 × 9 frame.

Introduced in December 2010, the Pentax 645D is a 40 megapixel medium-format DSLR. The camera has a 44×33 mm image sensor and the raw file is in DNG format. It is the first digital version of the company's 645 medium-format camera system and it is compatible with the existing 645 system lenses.

In early 2014, the first Medium format cameras with a CMOS sensor instead of a CCD sensor were introduced by Phase One and Hasselblad. This sensor type gives better image quality mainly in High ISO with a dynamic range of up to 14 f-stops. Phase One and Hasselblad used the same 50MP CMOS sensor made by Sony. Similarly, the Pentax 645Z uses a 51 MP CMOS sensor.

In January 2017, Fujifilm started its GFX series of medium format digital cameras with the introduction of its 50 MP GFX 50S model.

In 2019, Phase One launched its IQ4 series of digital camera backs at 100 MP to 150 MP resolution (included with both the XF IQ4 150MP Camera System (MSRP $51,990) and the XT IQ4 150 MP Camera (MSRP $56,990)), with the 150 MP generating 120.26 x 90.19 cm (47.35" x 35.5") 16-bit color images at 300 dpi.

In 2025, a variety of lower-cost medium-format digital cameras were available in the 50 to 100 MP resolution range. Available 100 MP cameras included the FujiFilm GFX 100 II (MSRP $7,499 without lens, 8K video at 30 p/4K video at 60 p), the FujiFilm GFX 100S (MSRP $5,999 without lens, 4K video at 30 p), the FujiFilm GFX 100S II (MSRP $4,999 without lens, 4K video at 30 p) and the Hasselblad X2D II 100C (MSRP $7,399 including a XCD 75 mm f/3.4 lens; no video capability).

== Low-budget medium-format cameras ==
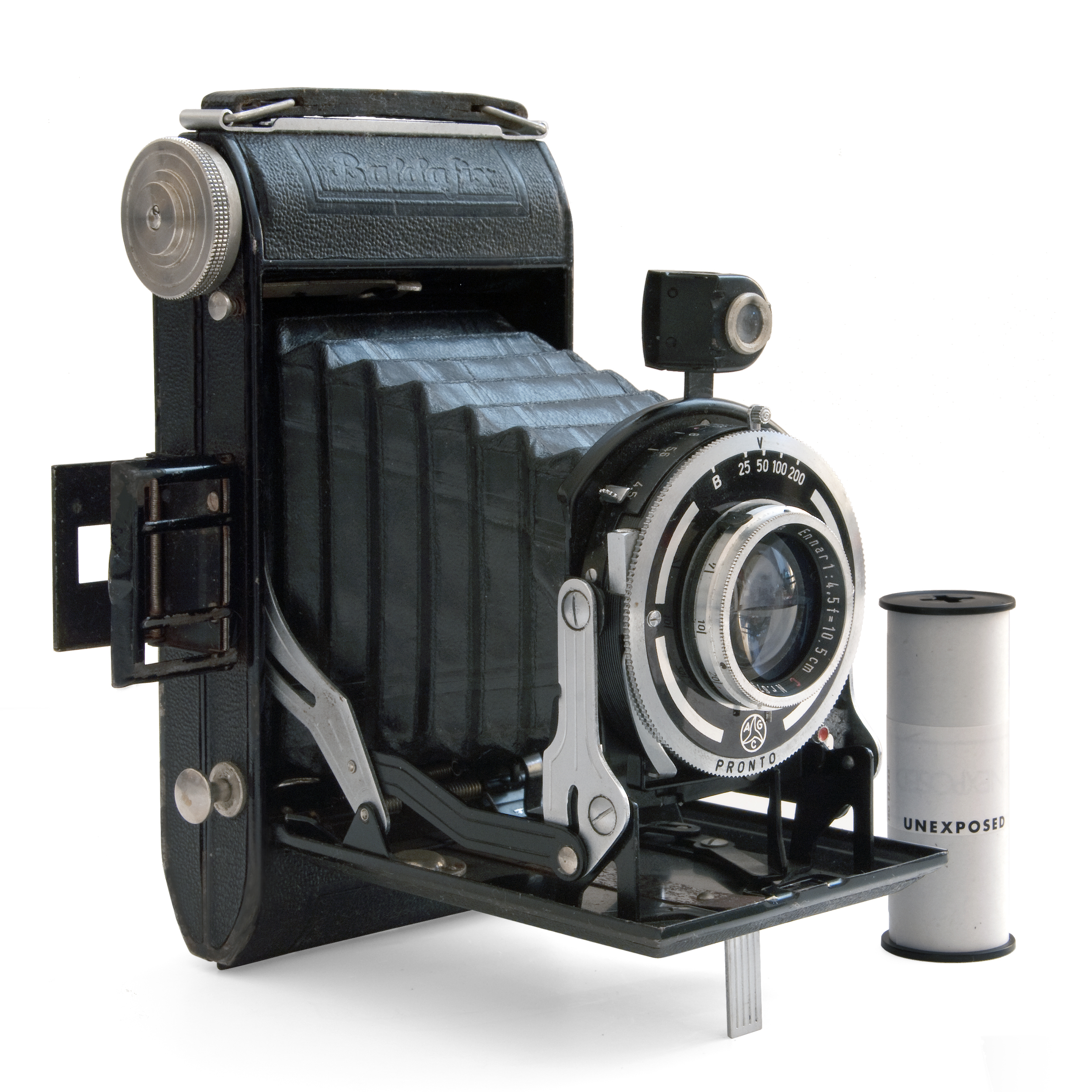
Baldafix folding camera, one of a large number of old folding cameras which used medium-format film, with a roll of 120 film

While most professional medium-format cameras are expensive, some cheaper plastic imports, such as the Diana and Holga cameras, have attracted interest among photographers. In the past, these cameras were often referred to as toy cameras, but they are also used as an alternative to professional medium-format cameras because of the distinctive characteristics of images they produce.

Lower cost medium-format cameras like the Diana F+ and Belair X 6-12 are sold through various outlets, including the Austrian Lomography company. In 2007, Lomography brought the 1960s Diana camera back to the market with the Diana F+ camera, a system camera that allows photographers to experiment with interchangeable lenses, flashes, and film backs. These cameras are characterized by their plastic lenses, light leaks that oddly colorize an image, extreme vignetting, and color saturation. While these elements can be considered as flaws to photographers seeking perfect images, many people enjoy the experimental results. Because of the popularity of the Lomography photographic style, medium-format photography has seen a resurgence with amateur photographers.

Twin-lens reflex cameras (TLRs) and folders without the distortion and light leaks can be purchased on the used market in the same price range. The Chinese Seagull TLR and medium-format cameras from the former Soviet Union such as the Russian Lubitel and somewhat better made Ukrainian Kiev-Arsenal 60 and 88 are also available at moderate prices. These cameras can deliver quality images, although the lenses and camera bodies are not at the level of those from Swedish, German, and Japanese manufacturers. Depending on the condition of the camera, they can produce images ranging from the Lomographic style to images closer to their European and Japanese counterparts. In 2008 Lomography also reintroduced the previously discontinued Lubitel with the Lubitel 166+, a recreation of the original 1946 Lubitel camera with some new features including dual-format capability.

Since 2014, Lomography has been producing its medium format version of the Soviet-original Lomo LC-A camera, the Lomo LC-A 120, as compact option for medium format photographers.

Used folding cameras, TLRs, and box cameras are also an inexpensive option to shoot medium format. Many U.S.-made folders, including most of the mass-produced Kodak folders, use the discontinued 620 film requiring the user to respool 120 films or modify the film spool to fit.

== Open source 3D printed cameras ==
There have been several projects to produce open source 3D printed cameras including K-Pan and Dora Goodman Cameras which produces medium format cameras as well as 35mm and large format compatible cameras. Goodman cameras are compatible with Mamiya press lenses and some Mamiya medium format film backs.

== See also ==
- Asahi Pentax
- Alpa
- Bronica
- Fujifilm
- Hasselblad
- Leica
- Linhof
- Mamiya
- Minolta
- Pentax
- Phase One
- Press camera
- Rolleiflex
