= The Slow Mo Guys =

British web series

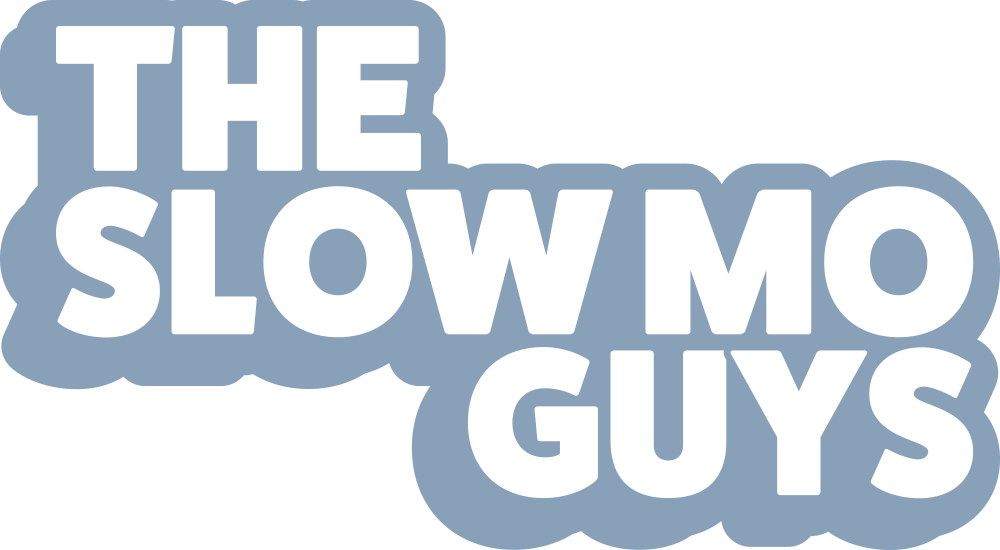
- Born: Gavin David Free; 23 May 1988 (age 38); Daniel Charles Gruchy; 28 July 1988 (age 37)
- Other names: Gav and Dan
- Occupation: Entertainers

YouTube information
- Channel: TheSlowMoGuys
- Years active: 2010–present
- Genres: Science; technology
- Subscribers: 15 million
- Views: 2.7 billion
- Last updated: 28 June 2026

The Slow Mo Guys is a science and technology entertainment web series from Thame, England, created and owned by Gavin Free, starring himself and Daniel Gruchy. It has been described as the biggest channel for slow motion videos on YouTube.

The series consists of a wide variety of things filmed in extreme slow motion using a range of Vision Research Phantom high-speed cameras, capable of shooting over 1,500,000 frames per second. The series premiered on 15 October 2010.

== Format ==
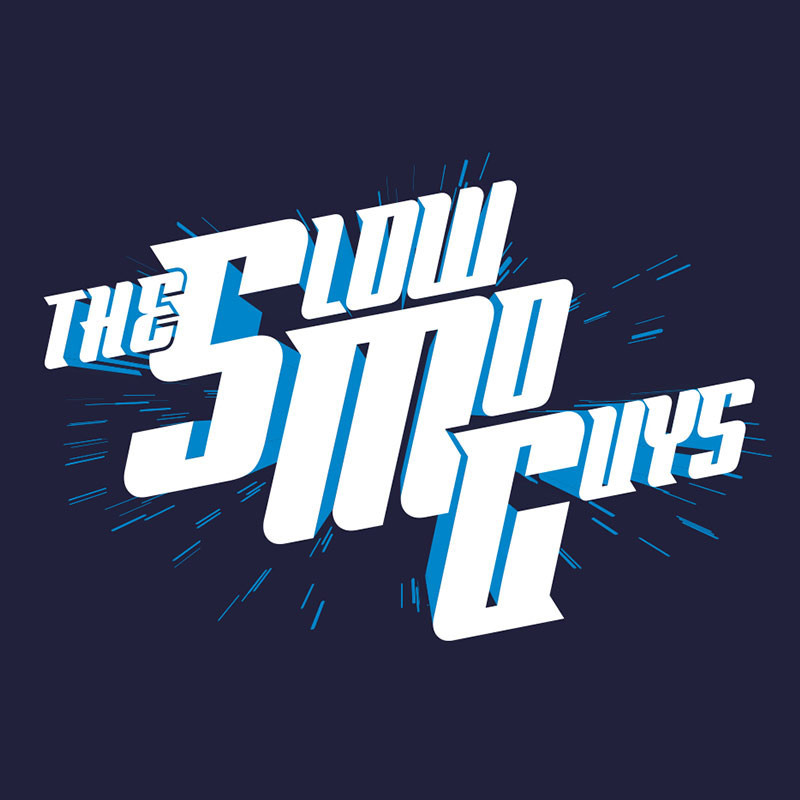
Previous logo

The Slow Mo Guys is heavily influenced by MythBusters; in a typical episode, Free and Gruchy attempt to film some sort of natural or physical phenomenon in extreme slow motion: subjects of the filming are often some type of spectacular chemical or physical reaction, stress tests of certain objects under extreme conditions, while some episodes simply aim for an aesthetically pleasing result, often by the use of rainbow-coloured paints. To emphasise the science angle, the pair wear lab coats. Because the original lab coats Free ordered were too small for Gruchy, Gruchy's lab coat tore; the torn off right sleeve has been carried on as a tradition on newer lab coats as well. Gruchy's lab coat is the more stained of the two, with Free's coat in fairer condition. The most prominent of the few stains on Free's lab coat is a blue paint smear on the right shoulder "autographed" by a Blue Man.

The episodes generally feature Free as the cinematographer and camera operator, and Gruchy, a former ammunition technician corporal in the British Army who served in Afghanistan, as the rigger and often also as the stuntman. Over the years, Gruchy suffered numerous injuries, such as a lacerated ear, a glass shard lodged in his finger, an oil burn and a fractured wrist; he jokingly noted that he has suffered more injuries during the filming of the show than during his tour in the Afghanistan war zone. Some episodes feature Gruchy explaining how some explosives work, such as grenades and detonation cord, allowing him to draw on his background in the military. Following the popularity of their most viewed video, Giant 6ft Water Balloon, Free and Gruchy have regularly produced further videos involving Gruchy in or around several-foot water balloons under the event of "Giant Balloon June".

The episodes are generally filmed in Free's backyard in Austin, Texas, usually with only the two of them involved. In the case of The Super Slow Show and Planet Slow Mo, as the budget of the show increased and more cast was involved, the experiments got larger and more elaborate; the availability of a designated camera crew allowed Free to participate in the stunts as well.

== History ==
=== Inception ===
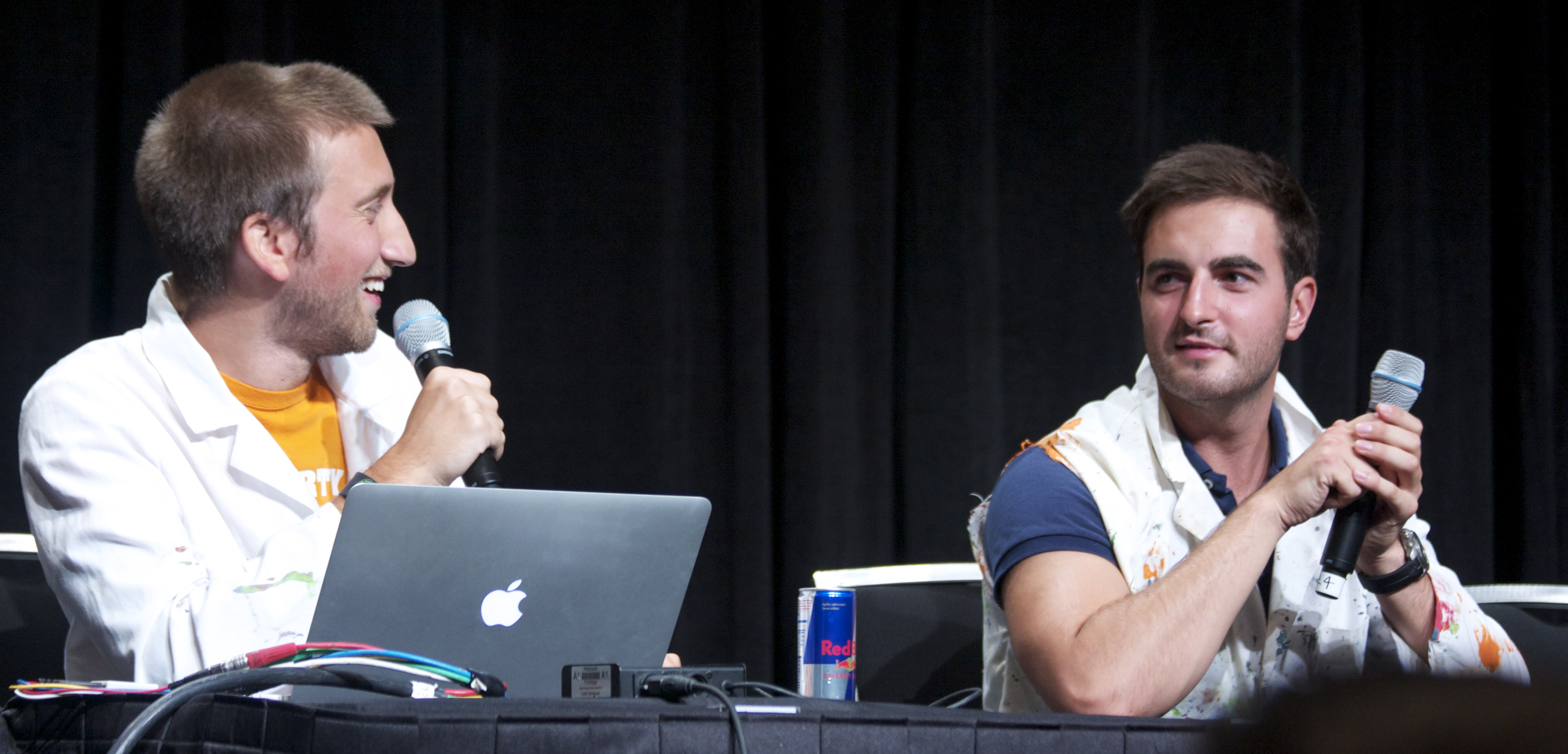
Gavin Free and Dan Gruchy hosting a panel at RTX 2013

In 2006, Gavin Free joined Green Door Films, the first production house in Europe to utilise Phantom digital high-speed cameras as a source of slow motion, working as a data technician and camera operator. He began working on adverts, music videos, and films such as Hot Fuzz. In 2008, he was hired to direct the seventh season of the Rooster Teeth machinima series Red vs. Blue. Afterwards, he had decided to make a move to Austin, Texas and work full-time for Rooster Teeth, for which he needed to get a work visa; however, as he didn't go to university, his only option was an application for an O visa, a visa that requires an "extraordinary achievement" in arts or science.

Being a video/film producer, he decided to utilise his access to slow motion cameras to create The Slow Mo Guys along with his friend Daniel Gruchy, who he first met while working in a Waitrose in their home county of Oxfordshire. According to Free, the Slo Mo Guys name partially comes from a comment Richard Hammond made on the set of Top Gear:

"[Richard] Hammond was the first person to ever refer to me as a "slow mo guy" because he knew there was a high-speed camera on the shoot that we were doing, which was him going around in a Formula 1 car. And he hopped over the wall as we were setting up the Phantom... he said, "oh you must be the slow mo guys," and I thought that sounds pretty good."

=== Success ===
In April 2011, the channel was voted the winner of YouTube's On The Rise program, which highlights up-and-coming YouTube partners on the homepage. In September 2012, their episode involving crushing watermelons was featured on The Tonight Show.

On 20 February 2013, Free confirmed that the series had been picked up by Rooster Teeth for broadcast and that further episodes of the series would be released on Rooster Teeth's website, as well as the series' existing YouTube channel, with Free remaining as the sole owner of Slow Mo Guys. A best of compilation was released by Rooster Teeth Productions for home video on 10 September 2013.

In January 2014, in collaboration with GE Global Research, the R&D division of General Electric, they released a video showcasing the company's latest innovations, including superhydrophobic surfaces and how magnetic nanoparticles behave like liquid magnets. Two additional videos featuring them demonstrating MEMS and "cold spray" 3D painting technology were also released on the official GE YouTube channel.

The series has been featured as part of YouTube's "Rewind" year-in-review video in 2013, 2014, 2015, 2016, and 2017.

The series was used as part of a 2014 YouTube advertising campaign. The advertisements featuring Free and Gruchy were titled "You Make Every Second Epic". A large image of Free and Gruchy was printed on a London bus as part of the campaign, alongside TV commercials, billboards and Tube station posters.

The series was nominated for a Webby Award in Best Web Personality/Host (Online Film & Video) in 2016. At the 2016 Streamy Awards, the series won in the Cinematography category.

On 27 March 2020, Oculus TV premiered their eight-part series collaboration with The Slow Mo Guys called The Slow Mo Guys VR. In this show, people would be able to watch Free and Gruchy recreate their videos in 3D slow motion.

Several videos have been made in collaboration with other entertainers. This has included filming of a sabrage competition with Rhett & Link; dropping bowling balls with the Blue Man Group; and providing Will Smith (wearing Gruchy's lab coat) a flamethrower to use on cardboard cutouts of himself.

==== YouTube Originals ====
In 2018, Free and Gruchy launched their first YouTube Original, The Super Slow Show. This was essentially The Slow Mo Guys, but on a grander scale, featuring new equipment; larger stunts, such as crashing through walls; and special guests, including Dylan Sprouse and Mayim Bialik.

In 2019, Free and Gruchy launched their second YouTube Original, Planet Slow Mo, in which the duo would travel around the world and film special events and stunts. A trailer was released on 21 January, with the first episode airing on 23 January.

==== COVID-19 ====
During the COVID-19 pandemic, as Gruchy lives in the United Kingdom, the international travel restrictions prevented him from travelling to Texas to take part in filming for about a year and a half. In video comments of later videos, Free would make a running joke about Gruchy digging a tunnel underneath the Atlantic Ocean to sneak into Texas. Gruchy would then reference the joke by digging himself out from the ground in the first video he was able join in again in 2022.

Dr. Anthony Fauci, then-head of the National Institute of Allergy and Infectious Diseases, appeared in an October 22, 2020, video in which he and Free advocated for "the importance of wearing masks and face coverings" to prevent the spread of COVID-19. Dr. Fauci subsequently described the video as "a perfect demonstration" of the need for people to wear face masks.

On February 4, 2021, Free appeared on behalf of the Slow Mo Guys on a Gates Notes-sponsored episode of PBS Digital Studios' Be Smart to promote herd immunity and COVID-19 vaccines.

==== Television ====
On 1 September 2022, Free and Gruchy's first television show, The Slow Mo Guys' Big Adventures, premiered on Sky Kids in the UK.

The ten-episode series features themed episodes about historical events such as the Wild West, the Viking era, and the first rocket launches.

== Awards and nominations ==
Year	Category	Award	Result
2015	Science and Education	Streamy Awards	Nominated
2016	Web Personality/Host	Webby Awards	Nominated
2016	Team Internet: YouTube Ensemble	Shorty Awards	Nominated
2016	Cinematography	Streamy Awards	Won
2017	Cinematography	Streamy Awards	Nominated
2018	Film & Video – Science & Education	Webby Awards	Nominated
