= BRUV =

BRUV is an acronym that may refer to:

- Baited Remote Underwater Video, a method to survey the presence of marine life in an area
- Britain Restoring Underlying Values, a British political party

== See also ==
- Bruv
