= Dora Goodman Cameras =

Camera company based in Budapest, Hungary

- Industry: Open source photographic equipment
- Genre: Camera equipment
- Founder: Dora Goodman
- Headquarters: Budapest, Hungary
- Area served: Worldwide
- Products: Cameras, camera accessories
- Website: doragoodman.com

Dora Goodman Cameras is an open source camera company in Budapest, Hungary founded by Dora Goodman. It uses 3D printing to produce open source 35mm, medium format and large format system cameras. The company sells its cameras through an online shop, as a DIY kit and fully assembled. It was created in 2016 to personalise and customise analogue cameras. It then began making cameras from wood before switching to 3D printing to meet demand.

Most of the company's designs are open source, with most files available free to download but some available only to Patreon supporters. The company encourages its customers to modify their cameras and share the designs with the community.

== Products ==
The company produces several models of open source, 3D printed cameras and camera accessories.

- Goodman Zone: A medium format rangefinder camera compatible with Mamiya Press lenses and the Mamiya PRO-S back. It has several accessories including a handle, a 3D-printed roll film magazine, and a ground glass focussing back and mobile phone back.
- Scura: A pinhole camera with a curved back to improve image quality. It can use 35mm film to produce panoramic images or 120 film (medium format) to produce 6×6 negatives.
- Goodman Film Canister: A film canister for both 120 film and 35mm which can be used as grip, tripod and gimbal.
- Goodman AA (Art Adapter): A 3D printed depth-of-field adapter with a replaceable projection screen that allows smartphones to use SLR lenses.
- Goodman Axis: A technical camera with bellows that can accept both Mamiya RB67 film magazines or sheet film.
- Goodman One: The first camera produced, it has bellows and is compatible with Mamiya Press lenses and Mamiya RB67 film magazines.
- Accessories: Including a magnetic camera strap, waist-level finder, wood inlay, gimbal, turntable, and a leather and 3D-printed bag.
