= Concord Camera =

Former American camera manufacturer

Concord Camera Corporation
- Type: Public
- Traded as: Nasdaq: LENS
- Industry: Photographic Equipment & Supplies
- Genre: Camera Manufacturer
- Founder: Jack Benun
- Defunct: 2009
- Fate: Dissolved
- Headquarters: Hollywood, Florida, United States
- Area served: Worldwide
- Key people: Ira B. Lampert
- Number of employees: 108
- Website: www.concord-camera.com
- Footnotes; Datasource: ZenoBank

Concord Camera Corporation was a camera manufacturer based in the United States. It produced primarily affordable cameras for consumer use under many brands. The majority of Concord products were produced in China.

On December 18, 2008, the company announced that it would liquidate. Concord ceased trading on May 11, 2009.

== Product range ==
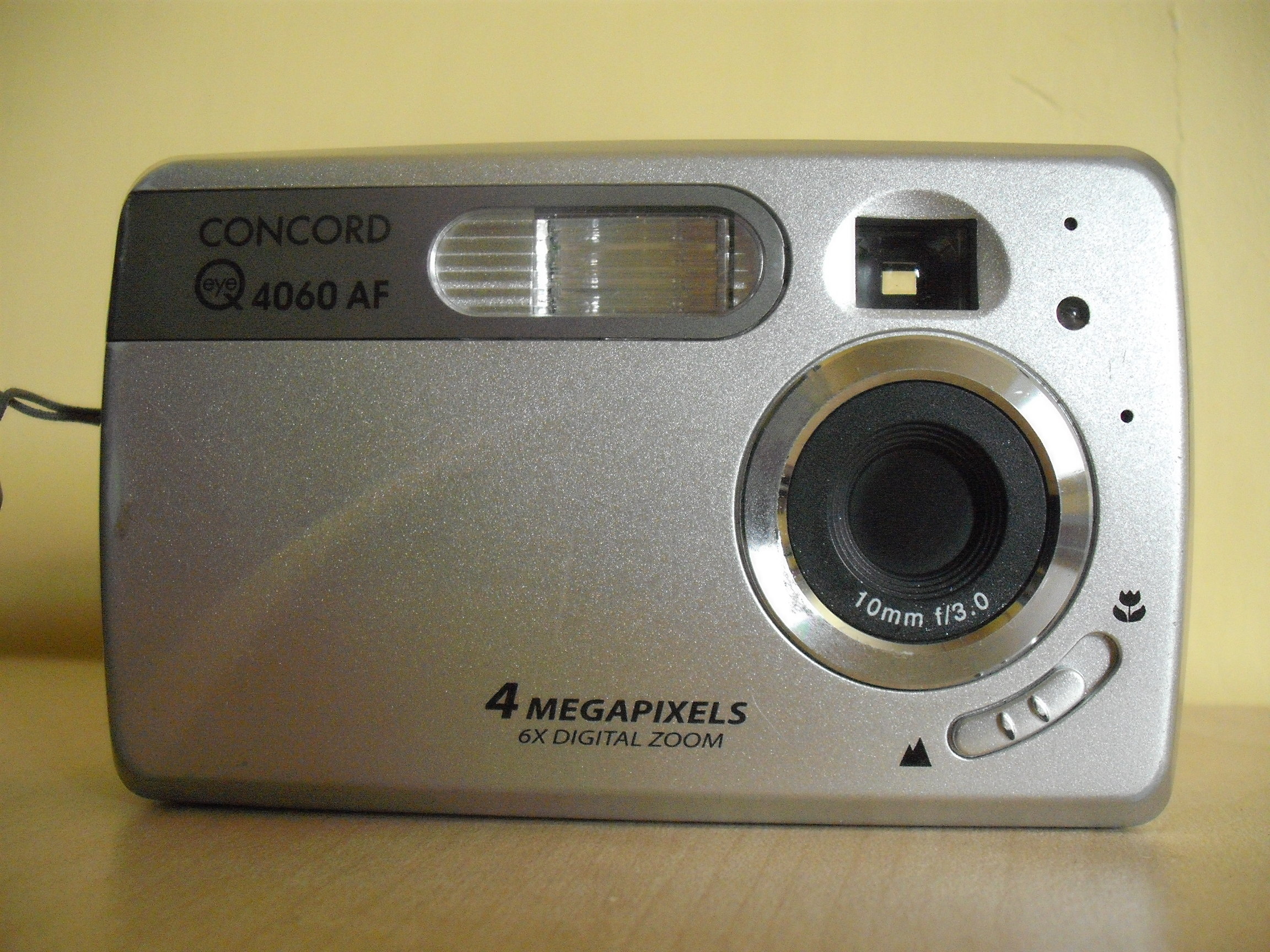
Concord Eye-Q 4060AF Digital Camera

Concord produced digital, 35mm, 110, and single use cameras. For example, the Concord 3045 camera is a 3.1 megapixel digital camera that was manufactured by Concord. It manufactured digital cameras mainly under its own Concord eye-Q range. Its single use and film cameras were sold under the Polaroid brand.

Concord also produced framing and photo storage solutions under its Frame and Store brand. This range included frames, photo cds and negative storage solutions.

Concord sold its image capture products worldwide through sales and distribution offices in the United States, Canada, Germany, Japan, Hong Kong, the United Kingdom and France, as well as through independent sales agents. They sold both branded and private label products to many of the largest retailers in the world, including Aldi, Argos, Boots, Carrefour, Comp USA, CVS, Dollar General, Eckerd, Family Dollar, Ito-Yokado, MetroAG, Rite Aid, Ritz Camera Shops, Target, Walgreens and Wal-Mart.

== Brands ==
Concord Camera manufactured products under the following brands before it ceased trading;

- Accomplishments
- Concord
- Concord Eye-Q
- Polaroid
- Fun Shooter
- On Guard Kids
- Frame and Store
- Easyshot
- Jenoptik

In 2004, Concord acquired Jenimage Europe GmbH, related to Jenoptik, and licensed the right to use the Jenoptik trademark for 20 years. It produced a range of compact digital cameras under the Jenoptik brand.
