= Eye-Q Go Wireless Digital Camera =

The Eye-Q Go Wireless Digital Camera was the first Bluetooth-enabled camera to be made and put on the market. It came with a small Bluetooth drive to plug into the back of a computer, which transmits pictures at a very slow rate (Uploading 7MBs of pictures takes 15 minutes, whereas a normal digital camera takes 8 seconds). It also employs a 2-megapixel CMOS sensor, which makes every picture very dark. The flash is also faulty, and when it does work, it is very slow.
