= Arecont Vision =

Defunct American security camera manufacturing company

Arecont Vision Costar, LLC
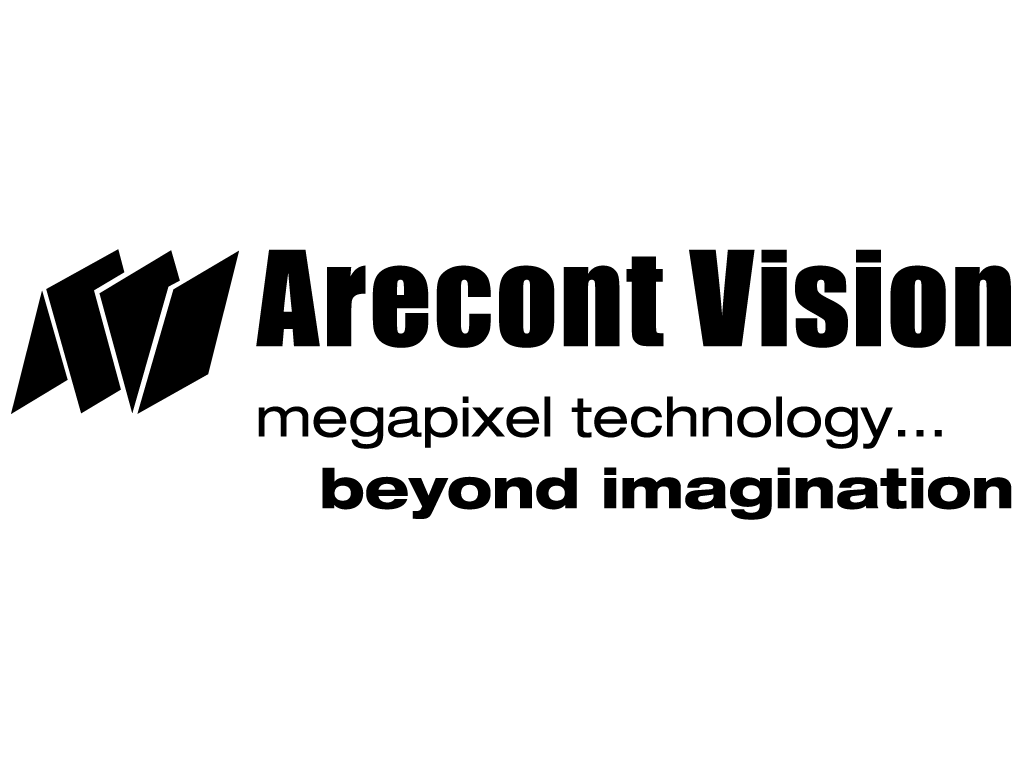
- Company type: Privately held company
- Industry: Video surveillance
- Founded: 2003 in Los Angeles, California
- Founders: Michael Kaplinsky, Vladimir Berezin
- Defunct: 2018
- Fate: Acquired after chapter 11 bankruptcy
- Successor: Costar Technologies, Inc.
- Headquarters: Glendale, California, United States
- Area served: Worldwide
- Key people: Scott Switzer (CEO)
- Products: Security cameras
- Parent: Costar Technologies, Inc.
- Website: www.arecontvision.com

Arecont Vision was an American company that manufactured video surveillance products. The company was based in Glendale, California, United States. In mid-2018, it went through Chapter 11 bankruptcy and was later acquired by Costar Technologies which continued to use the name as a brand.

== History ==
Arecont Vision was founded in 2003 by Michael Kaplinsky and Vladimir Berezin in Southern California.

=== Costar Acquisition 2018 ===
The original company was acquired in 2018 by Costar Technologies, Inc. (OTC Markets: CSTI), a Texas-based manufacturer of video surveillance and machine vision products, following a reorganization and Chapter 11 bankruptcy proceedings. The purchase price was reported as $11.25 million in cash.

The original company was closed, and Arecont Vision Costar, LLC, was launched in July 2018 as an operating division of Costar. In the aftermath of the Costar acquisition, 10 percent of Arecont's workforce was made redundant in early 2019. The company was later renamed as AV Costar.
