= IQinVision =

- Type: Private
- Industry: Physical security Imaging; Video surveillance
- Founded: 1998
- Headquarters: San Juan Capistrano, California, United States
- Products: Megapixel Network cameras
- Revenue: $21 million (Estimated, 2012)
- Number of employees: 60+

Megapixel IP Camera:
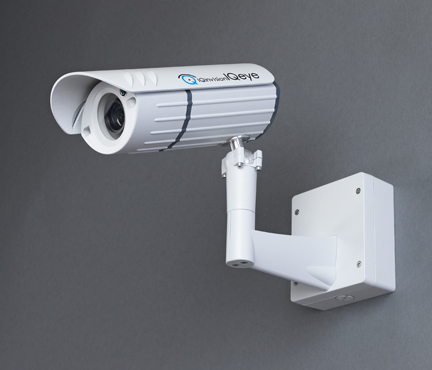
- Outdoor Megapixel IP camera
- Media type: Internet Protocol
- Encoding: H.264
- Capacity: 30+ fps
- Developed by: Open source
- Usage: Physical Security

IQinVision is a manufacturer of network cameras, IP cameras, and network video recording (NVR) systems. The company was founded in 1998. The company is headquartered in San Juan Capistrano, California, and it has offices in Lancaster, Pennsylvania and Utrecht, Netherlands.

IQinVision brands its cameras under the term "IQeye" and the cameras it produces can act as stand-alone surveillance systems or integrate with other systems via an API or Software Developer's Kit for full-custom applications. For example, IQeye camera integrate with many popular third party network video recorder applications such as those by companies like Aimetis, Genetec, Milestone, ONSSI, Mirasys and many others.

IQinVision brands megapixel IP cameras under its own name as well as under OEM models.

== Company history ==
IQinVision began as a technology merger between an Engineering Services firm, Gordian Technologies, and one of Gordian's customer's, a small startup company called "VISIQN" (literally 'IQ' within the word "Vision" with the Q replacing the O) that designed intelligent network cameras for the surveillance industry. The company was founded in 1998 to design, manufacture and market a line of megapixel/HD cameras. The company changed its name to "IQinVision" early on to avoid confusion.

The company has offices in San Juan Capistrano and Amsterdam.

In January 2011, the company held its first partner conference - the IQsummit. At the conference, the company gave updates on IQinVision and discussed the future of megapixel surveillance and networked security video.

In June 2013, Charles Chestnutt was officially appointed as the company's president and CEO. Charles had been serving since January 2012, as the company's interim chief executive officer.

In March 2014, IQinVision merged with Vicon Industries, another company that also specializes in digital surveillance.

== See also ==
- Professional video over IP
- Closed-circuit television (CCTV)
- Closed-circuit television camera
- Video content analysis
- Digital video recorder
- IP camera
- Physical security
