= A380 (disambiguation) =

The Airbus A380 is the world's largest passenger airliner.

A380 may also refer to:

- A380 road, a main road in South West England
- Arc A380, an Intel Arc graphics card
- RFA Cedardale (A380), a British fleet auxiliary vessel
- Jonway A380, a compact crossover SUV produced by Jonway Automobile in China
