= Remote camera =

Automated photography device

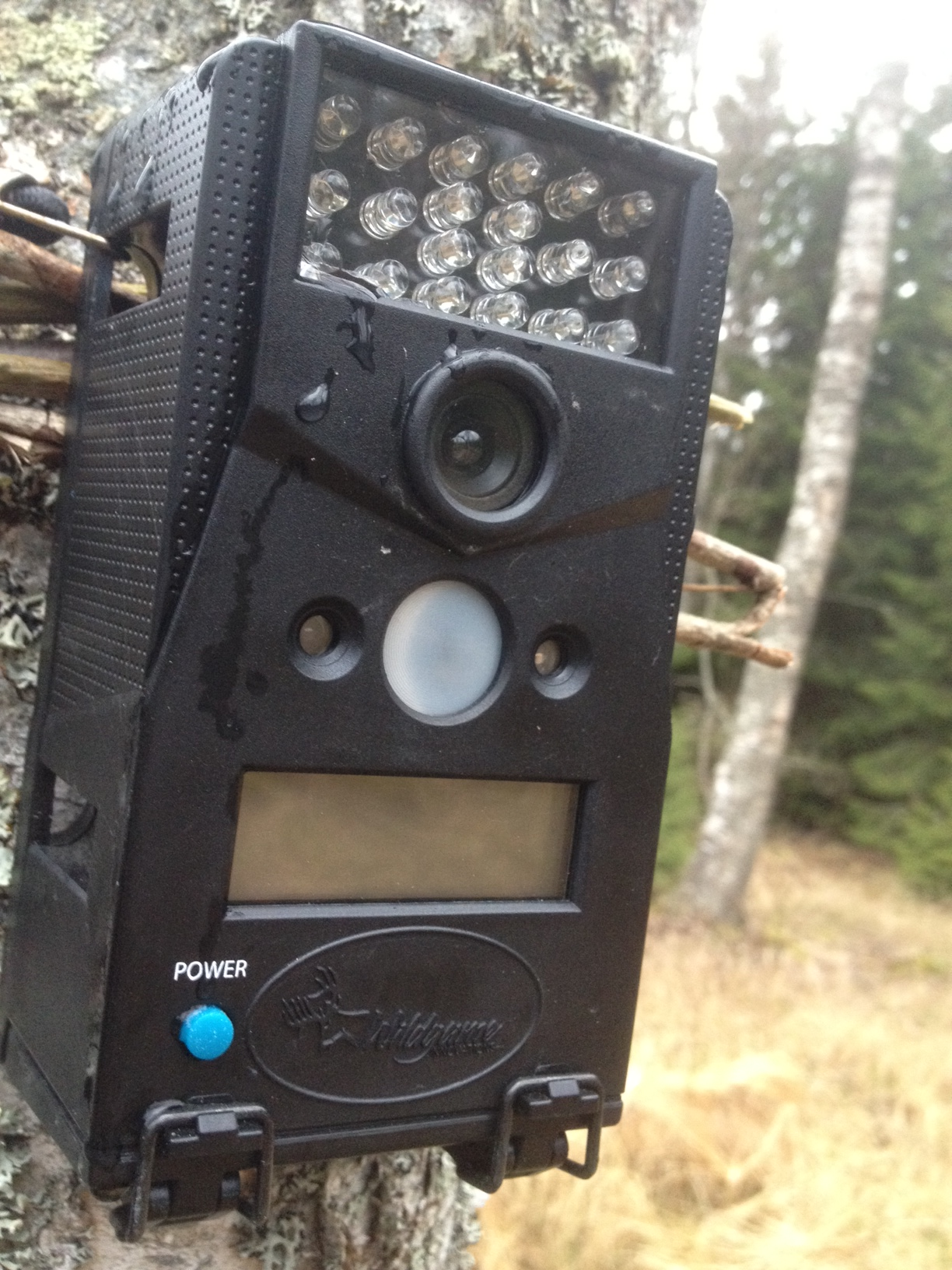
Remote camera. Top shows several LED flash lights, centre are the lens and PIR sensors.

A remote camera, also known as a trail camera or game camera, is a camera placed by a photographer in areas where the photographer generally cannot be at the camera to snap the shutter. This includes areas with limited access, tight spaces where a person is not allowed, or just another angle so that the photographer can simultaneously take pictures of the same moment from different locations.

Remote cameras are most widely used in sports photography. 35 mm digital or film, and medium format cameras are the most common types of cameras that are used.

== Uses and practices ==
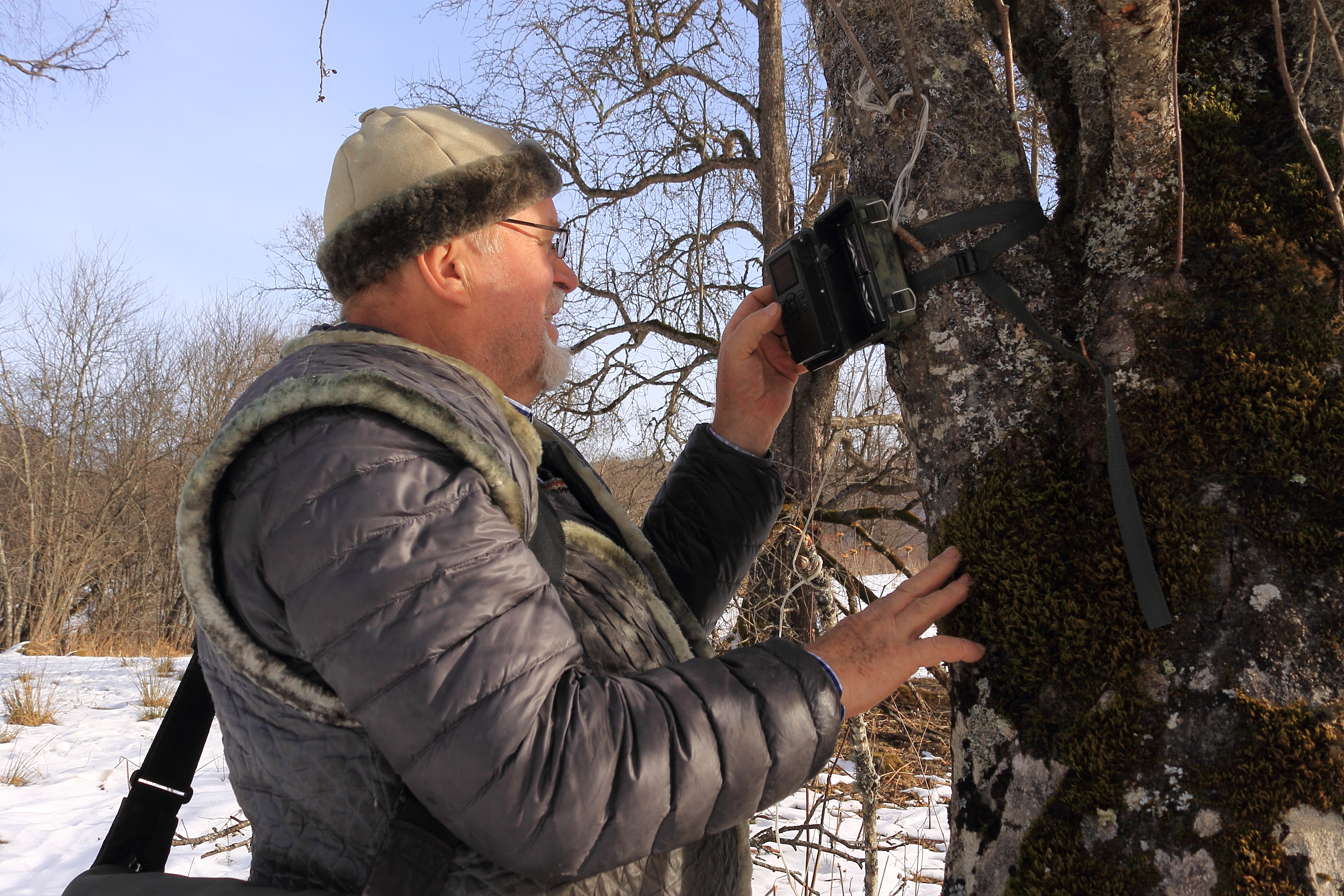
Professor A.N. Kudaktin examines remote camera for implementation of monitoring of wild animals within the Persian Leopard Reintroduction Program in the Caucasus.

Remote cameras are used by photographers to take more pictures from different angles. They are very popular in sports and wildlife photography.

Cameras are often placed in angles that a photographer cannot physically be during a shoot. Sport use examples include behind the backboard at a basketball game or overhead in the rafters of an arena during a hockey game.

A Baited remote underwater video ("BRUV") is an under-water equivalent.

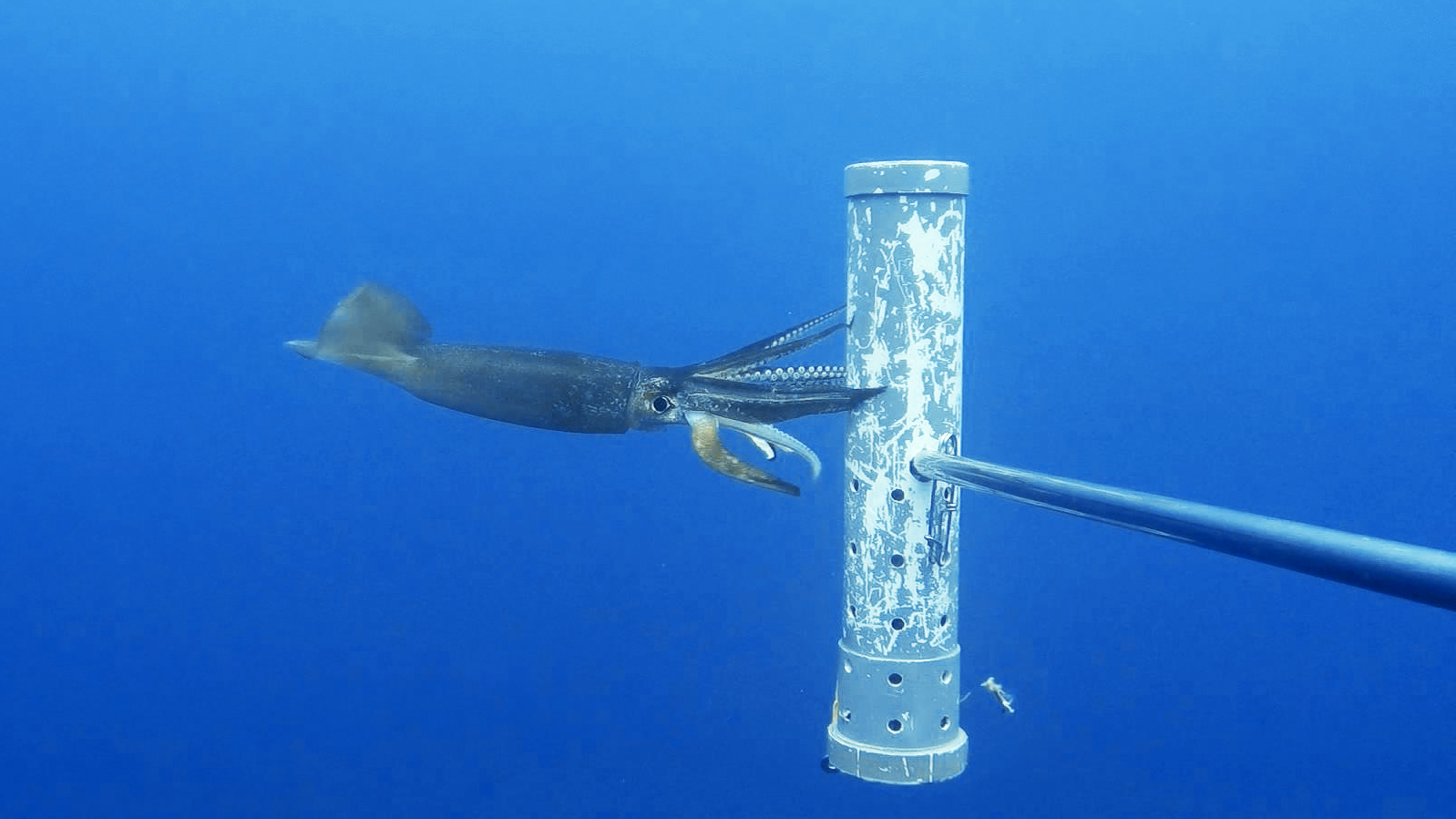
A Gould's flying squid captured by a BRUV

== Placement ==
Remote cameras placed in suspended positions usually are mounted with clamps and arms such as the Bogen Super Clamp and Variable Friction Arm, often referred to as "Magic Arms". The camera and lens are connected to the variable friction arm which is attached to the Super Clamp which in turn is secured to a fixed item such as a basketball post, hand railing, or rafter. Ground plates or tripods are typically used for remote cameras placed on the ground.

== Triggering ==
Remote cameras can be fired via hand triggers, sound triggers, radio transmitters (mainly Bluetooth shutters), a built-in self-timer, or a proximity sensor – in which case they are known as camera traps.

For remotes that are in close proximity to the photographer, hand or sound triggers can be used.

A hand trigger consists of a button or switch that is connected to the camera via a wire that is set to fire the camera's shutter.

For remotes that are placed away from the photographer, radio triggering systems such as the Bluetooth shutter button, Pocket Wizards or Flash Wizards are used. A radio trigger consists of a button or switch that is connected to a radio triggering transmitter or transceiver which is set to fire a radio triggering receiver or transceiver that is connected to the camera via a wire that is set to fire the camera's shutter.

For rocket launches, including the Space Shuttle, remote cameras are triggered by the sound of the launch.

== Game camera ==
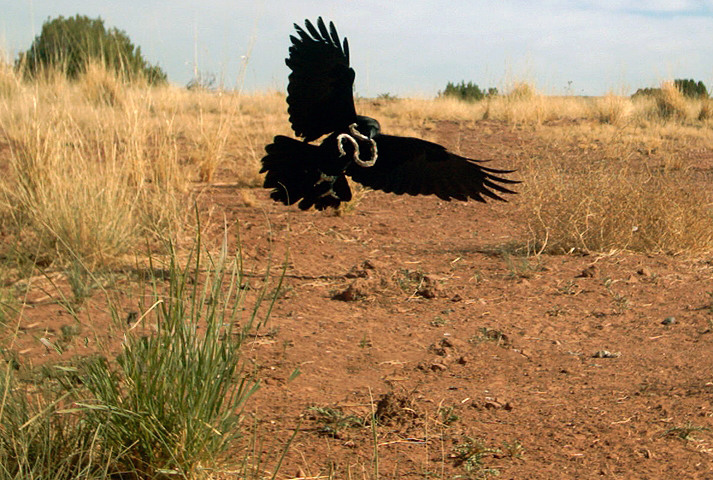
Photo of a Chihuahuan raven catching a snake, taken using a remote motion-sensor camera located in the Sevilleta National Wildlife Refuge

A game camera is a rugged and weather-proof camera designed for extended and unsupervised use outdoors. The images they produce, taken automatically when motion is sensed, are used for game surveillance by hunters, farmers, ranchers and wildlife hobbyists and professionals.

These cameras are intended to be strapped on trees or mounted on tripods (or other items), and they are motion-activated. This motion sensor enables the camera to capture images or videos of animals without using up all of its storage space. However, lots of photos of waving plants and moving water can clog up memory cards.

These cameras have been instrumental in the rediscovery of multiple species once thought to be extinct or driven out of an area, such as with the black-naped pheasant-pigeon, and fishers in Washington state. They have also used by people endeavouring to take photographs of the non-existent creature Bigfoot (among other cryptids).

They can also be helpful for animal loss/rescue in documenting the presence and species of animals, such as determining whether a runaway dog is returning to its home at night or verifying the species actually eating the food left for a stray/feral cat.

== See also ==
- Camera trap
- Digital camera
- Film format
- Infrared photography
- Movie camera
- Selfie stick
- Video camera
