= Vision Research (company) =

International high-speed digital camera manufacturer based in Wayne, New Jersey

- Industry: High-speed digital cameras
- Founded: 1992
- Headquarters: Wayne, New Jersey
- Area served: Worldwide
- Products: Phantom Cameras: v-Series, Miro Series, Cinema line
- Parent: Ametek
- Website: www.phantomhighspeed.com

Vision Research is an international company that manufactures high-speed digital cameras based in Wayne, New Jersey. Their cameras are marketed under the Phantom brand, and are used in a broad variety of industries including: defense, industrial product development, manufacturing, automotive, scientific research, and entertainment. Vision Research is a business unit of the Materials Analysis Division of Ametek Inc., a global manufacturer of electronic instruments and electromechanical devices.

== History ==
Founded as Photographic Analysis Company in 1950, they specialized in high-speed photographic research utilizing film cameras. They applied high speed photography to numerous industries and applications, and designed, manufactured and marketed products specific to the high speed photographic needs of each industry.

In 1992, Photographic Analysis Company shifted focus to designing and fabricating high speed electronic imagers that did not rely on photographic film for imaging. They formed a separate entity for developing digital high-speed imaging systems known as Vision Research Inc. Their ultra slow motion digital video line of cameras are currently marketed under the Phantom trade mark and was granted U.S. Patent #5,625,412 for high speed electronic digital imaging.

== Cameras and applications ==
The Phantom camera family consists of three camera lines and accessories.

The Miro line of small, lightweight cameras is used for mobile applications or situations where size and weight might be an issue in applications such as assembly line analysis, drop testing, particle image velocimetry (PIV), animal studies, bio-mechanical studies and automotive testing.

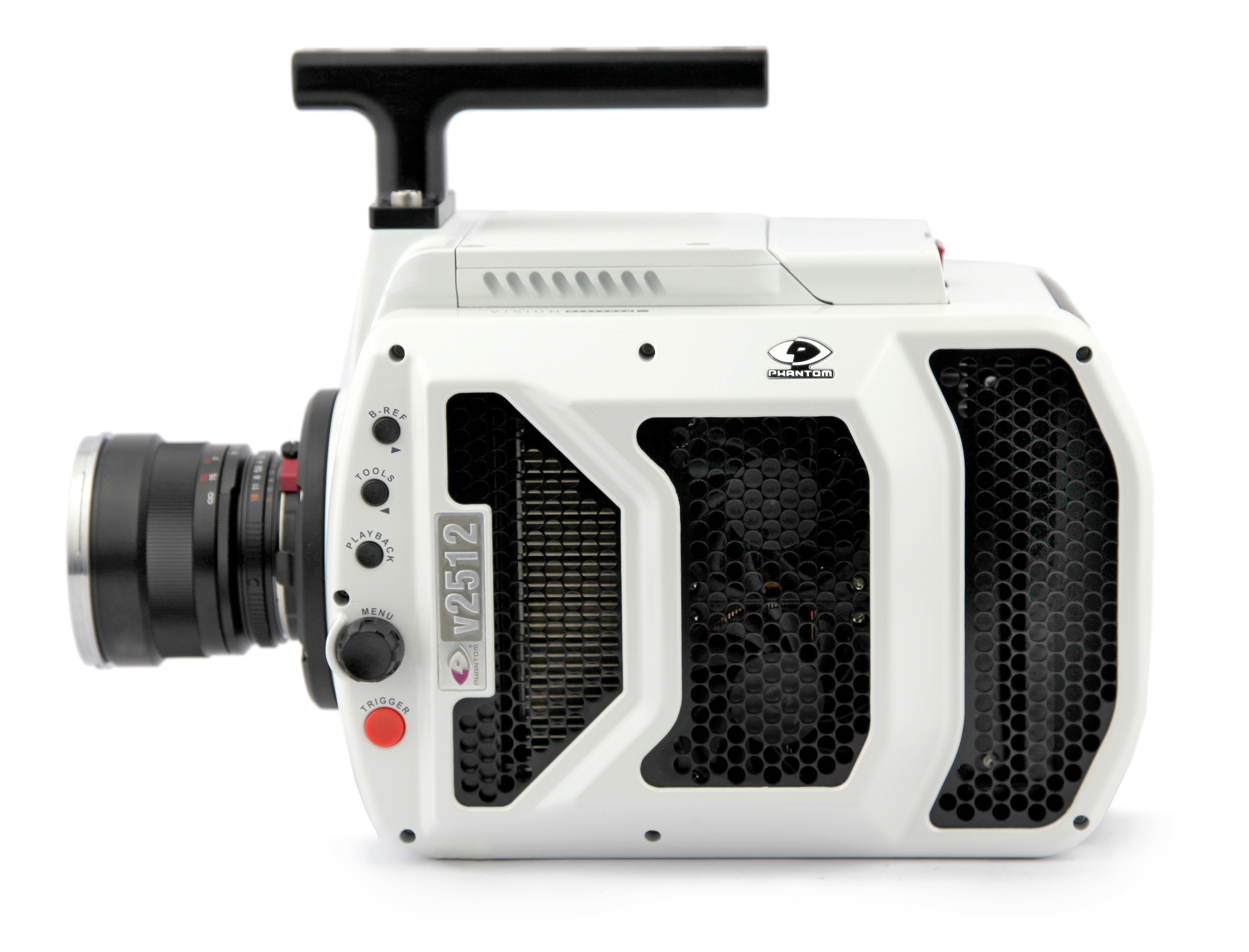
The Vision Research Phantom v2512, can capture up to 25,700 frames-per-second (fps) at full 1 megapixel resolution, making it the fastest member of the ultrahigh-speed digital camera line.

v-Series cameras are a broad line of high performance cameras used when applications demand the highest imaging speeds and/or resolution. The v-Series is used in applications such as ballistics testing, military research, engine development, high-speed x-ray video, and medical research.

The third line of cameras are targeted at TV & Motion Picture production for live event broadcasts and new media applications. The Phantom HD, 65 and Flex cameras are extensively used to capture detail in digital cinema and HD television productions and have won an Academy Scientific and Technical Award in 2012 and a Technology & Engineering Emmy Award in 2010. Two Phantom 65 cores are used for IMAX's 3D Digital camera. Vision Research also does custom engineering and specialty cameras for unique applications.

== Awards ==
- R&D Magazine- R&D 100 Award Winner 2000 - Phantom v4.0
- R&D Magazine- R&D 100 Award Winner 2002 - Phantom v5.0
- Mario Award - NAB 2004 - Phantom v9.0
- Vidy Award - Best of Show - NAB 2004 - Phantom v9.0.
- DTV Pick of Show - NAB 2004 - Phantom v9.0.
- Government Video Salute - NAB 2004 - Phantom v9.0.
- Best of IBC 2008 - Phantom v12.1
- Popular Science - Best of What’s New Award 2008- Phantom v12
- National Academy of Television Arts and Sciences (NATAS) 2009 - 2010 Emmy Award- In the category of “HD Super Slow Motion Systems for Acquisition, Recording, and Playback for Broadcast Entertainment and Sports Productions”
- Popular Science - Best of What’s New Award 2011- Phantom v1610
- Design and Innovation Award -IABC 2011 - Phantom v641
- The Academy of Motion Picture Arts and Sciences- 2012 Academy Scientific and Technical Award - The design and engineering of the Phantom family of high-speed cameras for motion picture production
- Digital Video Magazine - Best-of-Show Black Diamond Award NAB 2013 - Phantom Flex4k
- Mario Award- NAB 2013 - Phantom Flex4k
- TVB Europe Best of IBC 2013 - Phantom Flex4k
- Vision Systems Design - Innovators Award 2015
