= Seagull Camera =

Chinese camera maker

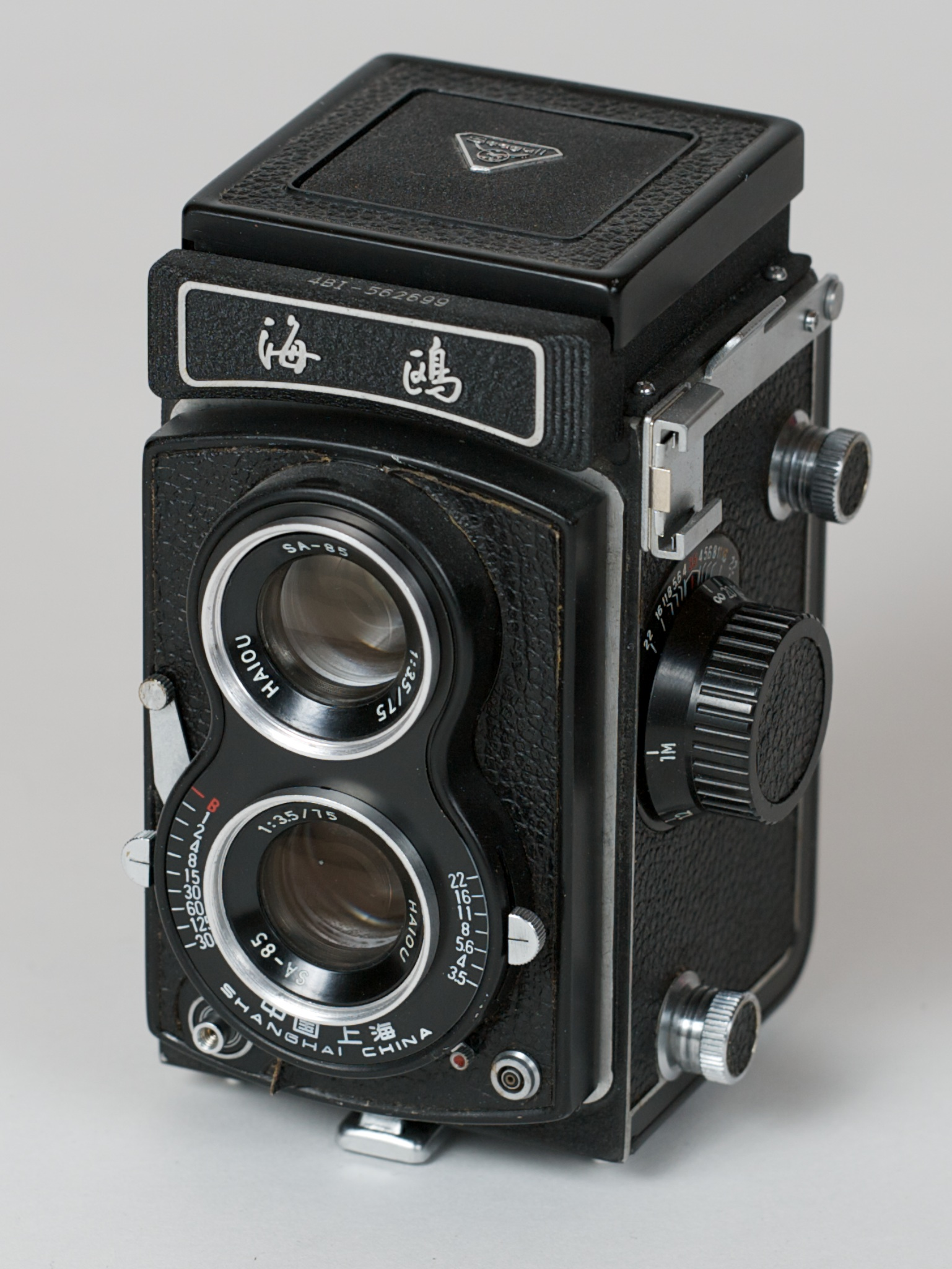
Seagull 4BI camera

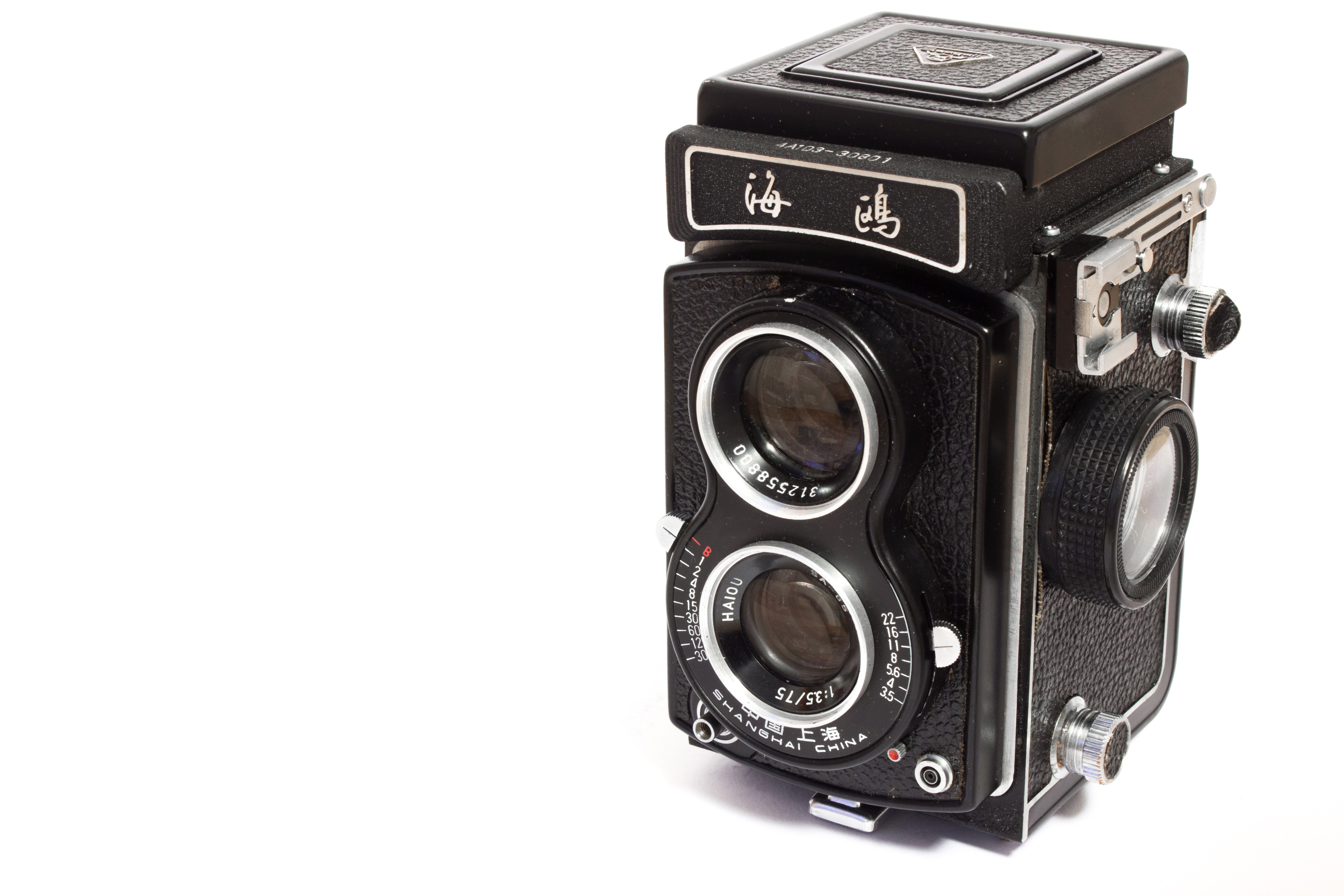
Seagull 4A(103) TLR camera

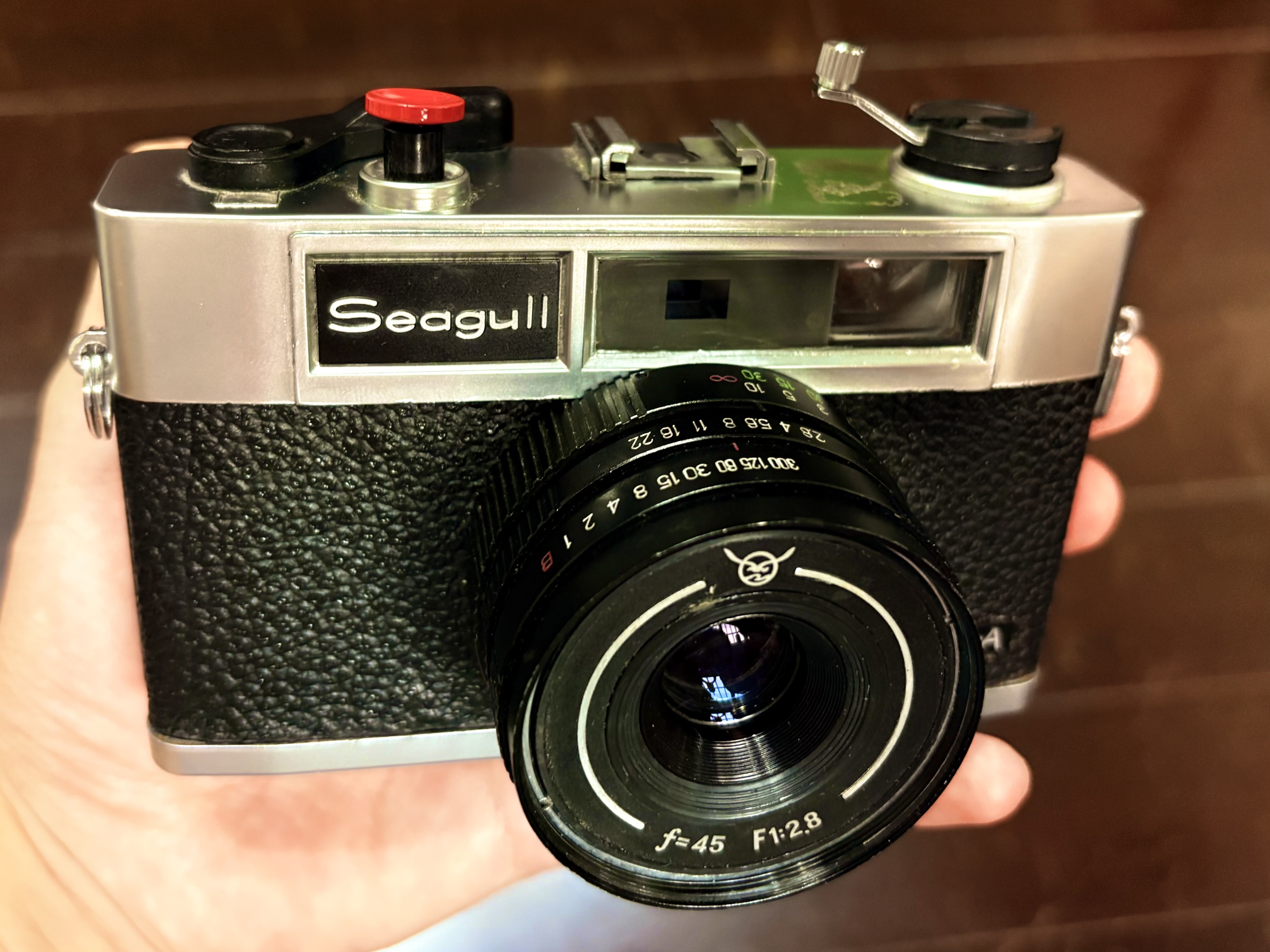
Seagull 206-A rangefinder camera

Shanghai Seagull Camera Ltd (Chinese: 上海海鸥照相机; pinyin: Shànghǎi hǎi'ōu zhàoxiàngjī) is a Chinese camera maker located in Shanghai, China. Founded in 1958, Seagull is the oldest camera maker in China. The product line of Seagull includes TLR cameras, SLR cameras, folding cameras, CCD and SLR camera lenses, large-format cameras, film, night vision scopes, and angle viewfinders. Seagull's cameras usually use basic, time-tested mechanical designs that require no batteries. Some Seagull cameras are distributed through the Lomography company.

Seagull adopted the SR lens mount from Minolta's manual focus SLRs and camera design under license, and continues to produce it long after Minolta moved on to autofocus Alpha lens mount cameras.

In 2009 a fixfocus-Digital camera DS-5060S with 5 MB-sensor was offered.

On June 10, 2012, Shanghai Museum of Old Camera Manufacturing opened to the public. The museum features historic items of the company, most noticeable the production line of Seagull 4A and collections of more than 200 cameras.

== Major models ==
- Seagull 4 (4·4A·4B·4B1·4C)

Seagull has been producing a series of Twin-lens reflex camera since the 1960s and it is believed that they are still producing; the latest model is 4A-109 featuring modern lens coating and some other improvements.

Seagull 4 is the first model from 1967. The predecessor is Shanghai 4.

Seagull 4A is the second model from 1968. Some Chinese amateurs consider the 4A and the later 4A-1 variants professional, partly because the camera was unaffordable for most Chinese citizens in the 1960s and 1970s. The 4A sold for 230 RMB and the 4A-1 for 290 RMB, whereas a worker earned only 20 RMB per month. The camera was unavailable to ordinary people, and only those working for government and press could afford one.

Seagull 4A-1 from the 1970s and later 4A-1XX models feature Tessar type lenses. Another noticeable feature is the long-awaited hot shoe. The later 4A-1XX models are mainly for selling overseas, hence the absence of Chinese characters is no surprise.

Seagull 4B and 4B-1 are simplified models of 4A. The 4B-1 may take 645 formats. The focus screen of 4B-1 is Fresnel lens achieving bright viewing. Unlike 4A, the original lenses for 4B and 4B-1 are three-element cooke triplet.

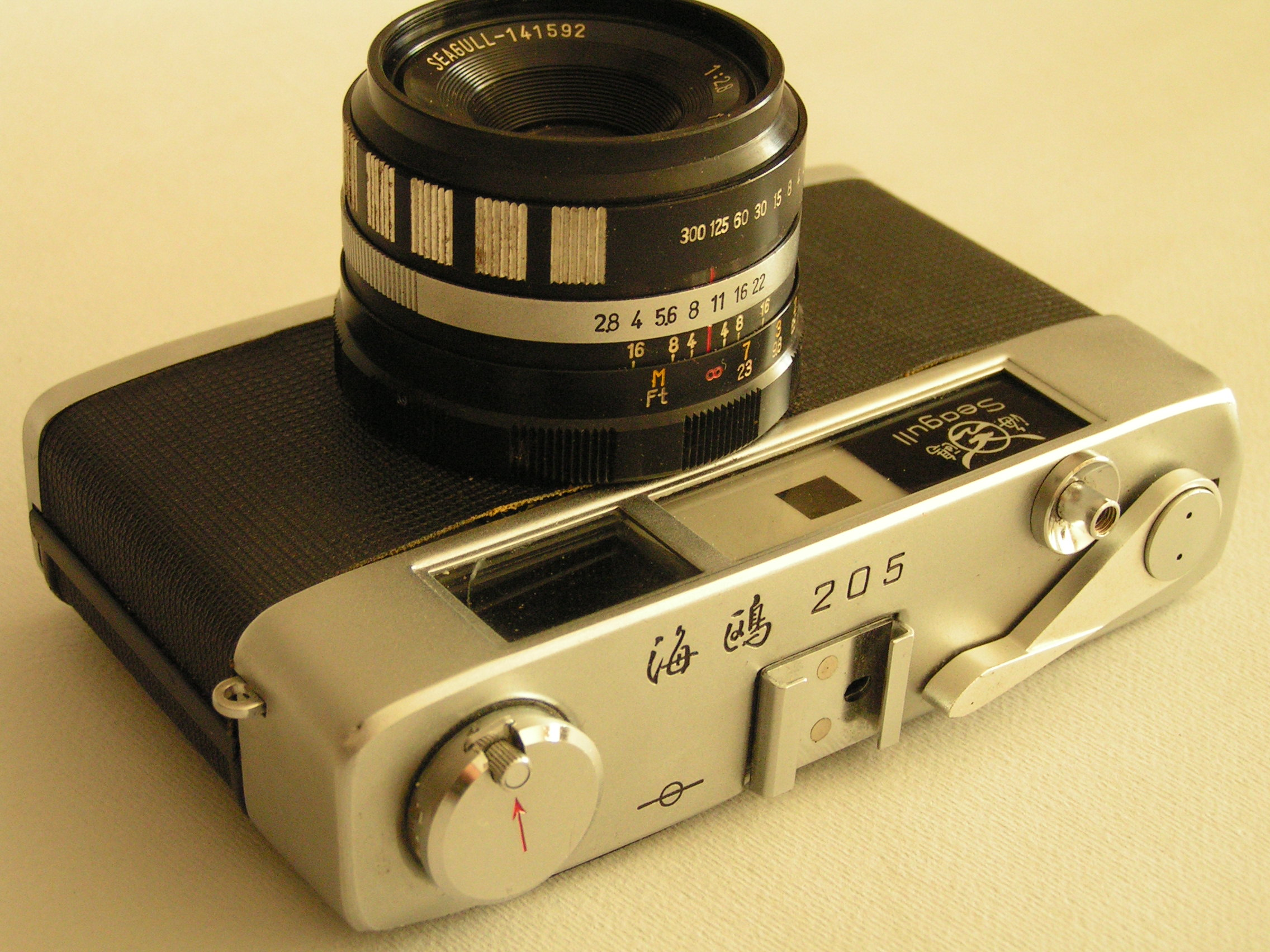
Seagull 205

As some Chinese vendors are selling proclaimed Tessar lenses components for upgrading old cameras, one may come up with 4B-1 featuring four-element lenses.

Seagull 4C can load 135 films. This model is however very rare.

- Seagull 203 folding roll film range-finder camera
- Seagull 205 range finder camera
- DF-300, DF-2000, DF-5000 SLR
- -I, II range finder
- Dong Feng (East Wind) medium format camera developed and produced during Cultural Revolution, only very limited amounts were produced.
- Red Flag 20 range finder camera, only very few were produced.
- Seagull 501 kJ·KE
