= Jenoptik =

German integrated photonics group

Jenoptik AG
- Type: Aktiengesellschaft
- Traded as: FWB: JEN; MDAX
- Industry: Optoelectronics engineering
- Founded: 1991
- Headquarters: Jena, Germany
- Key people: Dr. Stefan Traeger (President and CEO), Matthias Wierlacher (Chairman of the supervisory board)
- Services: Lasers and laser systems, precision lenses and optical components, metrology systems, traffic enforcement cameras, electric motors, generators, power supply units, optical sensors
- Revenue: €1,066 million (12/2023)
- Number of employees: 4,658 (12/2023)
- Website: www.jenoptik.com

Jenoptik AG is a Jena, Germany-based integrated photonics company. The company is listed on the Frankfurt Stock Exchange and is included in the TecDAX stock index.

== History ==
The group can trace its heritage back to the original Carl Zeiss AG company, founded in Jena in 1846. In 1846 Zeiss opened his optical workshop in Jena. After Carl Zeiss's death, Ernst Abbe, who had joined the workshop, became the sole owner and established the Carl Zeiss Foundation Jena, which subsequently owned the Carl Zeiss company and the Schott glassworks. In 1948, the Zeiss factory and the Schott glassworks were nationalised.

Following World War II, Jena fell within the Soviet occupation zone, later to become East Germany. In 1948, when it was apparent that the Soviet authorities were moving toward establishing a separate Communist state in their occupation territory, most of the main Zeiss company swiftly relocated to West Germany. The Soviet and East German authorities took over the old Zeiss factory in Jena and used it as the nucleus for the state-owned Kombinat VEB Zeiss Jena. In the mid-1950s, Carl Zeiss Jena registered the Jenoptik brand as the formal establishment of the name.

Following German reunification, and the fall of communism, the Treuhandanstalt took over the VEB Zeiss Jena combine. The Jena parent company was initially formed into Carl Zeiss Jena GmbH. The company then sold its microscopy division and other optical divisions to Carl Zeiss AG, effectively reuniting the old prewar Zeiss firm. Carl Zeiss Jena GmbH was renamed Jenoptik Carl Zeiss Jena GmbH on September 10, 1990. At the time the company consisted of 13 companies and employed approximately 30,000 people.

On June 25, 1991, an agreement was signed between the Treuhandanstalt, the states of Baden-Würtemberg and Thuringia, and the Zeiss companies. Lothar Späth, the former Minister President of Baden-Württemberg, became the head of Jenoptik Carl Zeiss Jena GmbH. That same year, Jenoptik Carl Zeiss Jena GmbH transitioned into Jenoptik GmbH, a state-owned company tasked with structural development in Jena, becoming the legal successor to the former state-owned combine. Jenoptik GmbH inherited the optoelectronics, systems engineering, photonics, mechatronics, and precision manufacturing divisions.

Divisions of Jenoptik Carl Zeiss Jena GmbH not transferred to Jenoptik GmbH were integrated into the newly formed Carl Zeiss Jena GmbH. Initially, Carl Zeiss AG, in Oberkochen, held 51% of Carl Zeiss Jena GmbH shares, while the Free State of Thuringia held 49%, managed by Jenoptik GmbH. In 1995, Carl Zeiss Oberkochen acquired Thuringia's share, consolidating its ownership.

In the ensuing years, the Jenoptik Group underwent restructuring to enhance profitability. The company engaged in acquiring new businesses and divesting others. A significant acquisition was Meissner + Wurst GmbH Co. KG (now M+W Group) from Stuttgart in 1994, which facilitated entry into several markets, especially in Asia. The company's premises in Jena were redesigned, with former Zeiss sites renovated and repurposed for new uses.

On May 10, 1995, Jenoptik transferred its 49 percent stake in Carl Zeiss Jena GmbH to Carl Zeiss in Oberkochen. Subsequently, on 1 January, 1996, the stated divested its interest and Jenoptik was converted into a stock corporation, renamed Jenoptik AG. In the same year, Jenoptik incorporated ESW GmbH from Wedel (now VINCORION), through which Jenoptik is involved in the production of the Puma infantry fighting vehicle.

Jenoptik held its initial public offering (IPO) on June 16, 1998, with an issue price of DM 34.00. In 1999, the company founded CyBio, originally known as Jenoptik Bioinstruments, as a spin-off company. In February 2002, Jenoptik Diode Lab GmbH was established in Berlin-Adlershof as a wholly owned subsidiary in collaboration with the Ferdinand-Braun-Institut, Leibniz-Institute für Höchstfrequenztechnik (FBH), focussing on high-power laser diode research. In 2003, Lothar Späth transitioned from his role as Chairman of the Management Board to join the Supervisory Board.

The JENOPTIK trademark is owned by Jenoptik AG. Jenoptik is regarded as one of the few companies descended from an East German state-owned enterprise to be successful in the post-Reunification era.

In 2004, Concord Camera Corp. of the United States acquired a related company Jenimage Europe GmbH, and licensed the right to use the Jenoptik trademark for 20 years. It produced a range of compact digital cameras under the Jenoptik brand.

In May 2005, Jenoptik inaugurated a research centre for plastic optics in Triptis, Thuringia. By this time, Jena-Optronik GmbH, established in 1991, had become a wholly owned subsidiary of Jenoptik. During the same year, the company decided at its Annual General Meeting to divest its Clean Systems division to focus on its more profitable optics business. Consequently, Jenoptik sold its shares in M+W Zander Holding AG (now M+W Group) in Stuttgart to the investment firm Springwater Capital. This move significantly downsized the company, which had recently employed around 10,000 people.

In August 2017, the company announced it would acquire the American-based process automation firm, Five Lakes, merging the company with its laser-machine business.

In 2018, Jenoptik acquired Prodomax Automation Ltd., a Canadian manufacturer of automated production lines, to add to their technology portfolio of laser processing and automation.

After Jenoptik announced in July 2019 to aim for a sale of this company division to concentrate the core business with lasers, measurement technology and optical systems, Vincorion was sold to a Fund of the British financial investor Star Capital Partnership in November 2021. Jenoptik indicated a company value of 130 million euros.

As of September 2020, Jenoptik acquired the Hamburg-based optics group TRIOPTICS, an international supplier of test equipment and manufacturing systems for optical components and digitalization. In late 2021, the company acquired BG Medical Applications GmbH, a supplier of precision optical components for the medical technology sector, and the SwissOptic Group, a developer and manufacturer of optical components and assemblies for the medical technology, semiconductor and metrology sectors.

As a partner in NASA's Mars 2020 mission, Jenoptik produced lens assemblies for the engineering cameras of the Mars rover, Perseverance, which began its expedition on Mars in February 2021. In November 2021, Jenoptik became a member of the United Nations Global Compact network for corporate responsibility and committed to compliance with integrating aspects of the Sustainable Development Goals into its business strategies."

In December 2021, the company released a new business strategy, Agenda 2025 'More Value,' and an organizational restructuring took effect in April 2022. The group focused its operations on purely photonics technologies by consolidating its three prior divisions into two: "Advanced Photonics Solutions" and "Smart Mobility Solutions." Since the 2022 restructuring, Jenoptik's primary markets are the semiconductor equipment and electronics, life science and medical technology, and traffic and security industries. Its non-photonic activities, particularly within the automotive market, operate within the group's "Non-Photonic Portfolio Companies.

== Operations ==
As of 2021, Jenoptik reported about 4,900 employees and sales of €895 million. Since June 1998, Jenoptik has been listed on the Frankfurt Stock Exchange and is included in the TecDAX index. The Jenoptik Group headquarters are in Jena (Thuringia). In addition to several major sites in Germany, Jenoptik has offices in 80 countries and major production sites in the US, France and Switzerland. It owns significant stakes in companies in Singapore, India, China, Korea, Japan and Australia.

The company's customers include companies in the semiconductor equipment; electronics; life science and medical technology; and traffic and security industries.

Dr. Stefan Traeger has been the chairman of the executive board of Jenoptik AG since May 1, 2017. Hans-Dieter Schumacher is the chief financial officer.

== Divisions ==
=== Light & Optics ===
The Light & Optics division of Jenoptik serves as a development and production partner for optical and micro-optical systems, catering to information and communication technologies, security and defense technology, and application solutions for the life science industry as well as laser, automotive and lighting applications. This division contributed to the development and manufacture of the electronics for the Leica M9 camera and included the Swiss view camera manufacturer Sinar. As of 2008, it employed around 1,000 people.

Key Products and Capabilities:

- Optomechanical and Optoelectronic Systems, modules and assemblies.
- Single and multi-coated optical components, aspherical lenses, filters, and cylindrical lenses.
- Diffractive and refractive optical elements, micro-optical systems.
- Components for digital microscopy and camera systems.
- Photodiodes, LED, and color sensors.
- Semiconductor Chips.
- Optoelectronic high-performance components.
- Polymer Optics.
- Laser Technology (laser-specific epitaxial layer structures on wafers, laser diode bars and single emitters, high-power diode lasers, solid-state lasers (disk lasers, fiber lasers), and pulsed high-power laser systems).
- LED Industrial Lights.
- Laser Sensors and Infrared Technology for distance measurement and combat simulation.

=== Light & Production ===
The Light & Production division of Jenoptik focuses on enhancing the efficiency and effectiveness of industrial production processes through optical and photonic technologies. It is recognised as a leading manufacturer of measurement technology and laser systems, particularly for the automotive industry.

Laser Systems:

- for cutting, welding, and perforating plastics, metals, glass, ceramics, and semiconductor materials.
- for processing, structuring, decoating, separating, and drilling of solar cells
- for three-dimensional processing of metals

Industrial Metrology:

- Measuring devices and machines for roughness measurement.
- Contour and form measurement, dimensional metrology.
- Optical shaft measurement and surface inspection.

Customised Solutions: Tailored to meet specific industrial needs, enhancing the precision and efficiency of production processes.

=== Light & Safety ===
The Light & Safety division of Jenoptik focuses on developing, producing, and selling components, systems, and services aimed at enhancing road and municipal safety globally.

Products and Services:

- Systems and Components:
  - OEM components
  - Cameras
  - Radar and laser-based sensors
  - Classifiers
- Modular Traffic Monitoring:
  - Red light monitoring
  - Speed enforcement
  - Vehicle classification
- Service Offerings:
  - Operator models
  - Outsourcing solutions
  - Consulting
- Software: Solutions for traffic management and safety.

=== Vincorion (until 2021) ===
Vincorion operated as an independent brand within Jenoptik, focusing on mechatronics. The division specialised in advanced electromechanical and optical systems.

Key Products and Capabilities:

- Aviation Systems:
  - Transportation systems
  - Lifts
  - Rescue winches
- Observation Platforms:
  - Ground-based systems for surveillance and observation
- Military and Civilian Equipment:
  - Driving and aircraft systems
- Optical Sensors:
  - Security and aerospace industry applications
- Electrical Systems:
  - Power generation and distribution
- Mechatronic Systems:
  - Stabilisation systems

In July 2019, Jenoptik announced its intention to sell the Vincorion division to concentrate on its core businesses in lasers, metrology, and optical systems. In November 2021, Vincorion was sold to a fund managed by British financial investor Star Capital Partnership for an enterprise value of 130 million euros.

== Subsidiaries ==
=== Jenoptik Automation Technology ===
Jenoptik Automatisierungstechnik (JOAT), a wholly owned subsidiary of Jenoptik AG, was established on July 1, 1995, and is headquartered in Jena. JOAT specialised in manufacturing laser material processing systems, along with handling and assembly systems. Its product line for industrial laser systems is branded as "Jenoptik-Votan".

In 2001, JOAT founded Jenoptik Laser Technologies in Brighton, Michigan, USA, which features its own laser application centre for technology development. Another subsidiary, Jenoptik Katasorb GmbH, was formed in 2002 from Jenoptik Automatisierungstechnik GmbH and produces exhaust air purification systems.

Since 1996, JOAT has been producing laser systems used for cutting, welding, perforating, and surface restructuring. These systems serve industries including automatic, packaging, and semiconductor processing across Europe, America, and Asia.

In addition to laser systems, the company manufactures automation technology including assembly and inspection systems.

=== Jenoptik Laser ===
Jenoptik Laser GmbH, based in Jena, forms part of the Lasers business unit of Jenoptik's Lasers & Material Processing division. The company develops, manufactures, and sells a range of OEM laser beam sources, including laser diode wafers, bars, submounts, stacks, high-power diode lasers, and solid-state lasers, catering to a global market.

Jenoptik has been active in the diode and solid-state laser market since the 1990s, expanding in line with the growth of this market segment. On May 3, 2010, Jenoptik Laser GmbH was established through the merger of Jenoptik Laserdiode GmbH and the Laser Technology business unit of Jenoptik Laser, Optik, Systeme GmbH, through the unification of diode and solid-state lasers activities. The company positions itself within the global laser technology market as a quality leader in high-power diode lasers.

Technological Leadership

The company investigates the causes of laser failure, improving chip and bar assembly, enhancing cooling systems, and developing advanced micro-optical beam guidance systems for high-power diode lasers.

The company provides turnkey diode laser systems and diode-pumped solid-state and fiber lasers for both pulsed and continuous wave (cw) operations for solid-state lasers. They also offer customized OEM solutions at various integration stages.

Applications:

- Industrial: Welding, cutting, and soldering metals and plastics.
- Medical and Cosmetic: Retinal attachment, hair removal.
- Entertainment: Show lasers.
