= General Imaging =

American Manufacturer

- Industry: Electronics
- Founded: 2006; 20 years ago
- Founder: Hiroshi Komiya
- Defunct: October 5, 2015
- Fate: Filed for bankruptcy
- Headquarters: Torrance, California, United States
- Products: Digital cameras

General Imaging was a manufacturer of digital cameras headquartered in Torrance, California, United States, established in 2006 by Hiroshi "Hugh" Komiya, a former executive of Olympus Corporation. General Imaging sold their cameras internationally under the General Electric name, used under license. General Imaging was licensed to manufacture and sell their cameras under the AgfaPhoto name in Japan. On October 5, 2015, General Imaging filed for bankruptcy.

== Products ==
=== A Series ===
The entry-level GE-branded digital cameras are designed for first-time buyers and those upgrading from first-generation digital cameras. Models in this series are powered by two AA alkaline batteries.

==== A730 ====
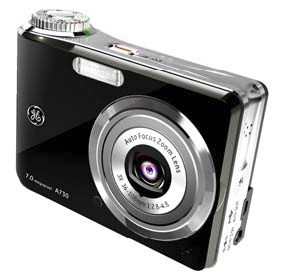
A Series

The A730 is an inexpensive point-and-shoot GE-branded 7-megapixel camera. It has a 3× optical zoom and a 4.5× digital zoom. The screen is a LTPS TFT, 153,600 pixel, 2.5 inch, color LCD. ISO Sensitivity is Auto, ISO 80/100/200/400/800/1600. Internal memory is 26 MB. A SD/SDHC slot supports up to a 4 GB memory card. Power is by two AA batteries, alkaline or NiMH recommended.

==== A830 ====
The A830 is a point-and-shoot 8-megapixel camera that has the same zoom capabilities and other features of the A730.

==== A1230 ====
The A1230 is a 12.1-megapixel camera with a 3× optical zoom lens. 4.5× digital zoom is also provided for a total available zoom of 13.5×. The camera supports electronic image stabilization, face detection, smile detection, blink detection, and red-eye removal. A mini USB port on the side of the camera allows users to download image files to a computer which recognizes the A1230 as a removable drive. The screen is an LTPS TFT, 153,600 pixel, 2.5 inch, color LCD. ISO sensitivity options are Auto, ISO 64/80/100/200/400/800/1600/3200(3M). It has 24 MB of internal memory. A SD/SDHC slot supports up to an 8 GB memory card. It is powered by two AA batteries (alkaline or NiMH recommended). The camera's firmware lacks a battery type selection setting option to obtain optimum use from NiMH batteries. Known firmware versions are 1.01 D7 and 1.10 D7. The latter version has paginated menus whereas the early version has scrolling menus.

=== C Series ===
Like the A series, the C series lineup all work off of AA Batteries with a slot for an SD/SDHC card. What differentiated the A and C series was that the C series focused on wider angle lenses when compared to their direct lineup counterparts. Presumably the "W" in the name code refers to this, as neither the C1033 or C1233 state their lenses are wide angle on the upper lens housing, whereas the C1440W and C1640W do (as do the E series E1486TW E1680W).

==== C1033 ====
The C1033 features a 10.1 megapixel sensor. 3x zoom. Data sync port for AV out.

==== C1233 ====
The C1233 features a 12.1 megapixel sensor. 3x zoom. Data sync port for AV out.

==== C1440W ====
The C1440W features a 14.1 megapixel sensor. 4x zoom with 27mm lens. micro USB port for sharing photos to a PC or for AV out. 720p video capturing.

==== C1640W ====
The C1640W features a 16.1 megapixel CCD sensor. 4x zoom with 27mm lens. Micro usb port for data transfer to PC, or acting as line out AV. 720p video capturing at 15 or 30 frames per second.

=== E Series ===
The intermediate level of the GE-branded camera models, the E series features larger screens and is powered by rechargeable lithium-ion batteries. Memory can be expanded up to 4 gigabytes with SD or SDHC memory cards.

==== E850 ====
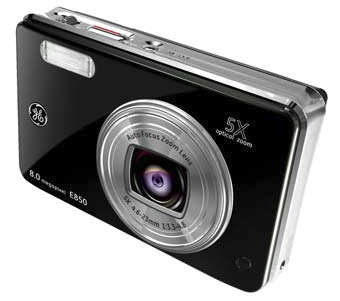
E850

The E850 includes a 28 mm equivalent wide-angle lens, a 5× optical zoom and 8 megapixels. The wide-angle lens is useful for large indoor group photos. It has a 5× optical zoom and the 4.5× digital zoom. The camera comes with a 3-inch (76 mm) LCD screen. It also can delete unwanted sections of a photo

==== E1030 ====
The E1030 has 10 megapixels, a 3× optical zoom and 4.5× digital zoom, which combine for a maximum zoom of 13.5×. The LCD screen is 2.7 inches (69 mm).

==== E1040 ====
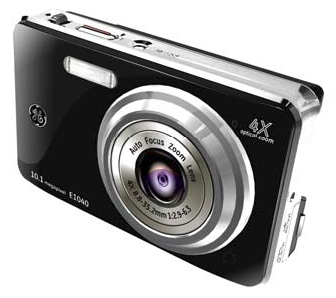
E1040

The E1040 includes 4× optical zoom, 4.5× digital zoom; and 10 megapixels. 3-inch (76 mm) LCD screen.

==== E1240 ====
The E1240 features 12 megapixels. A 4× optical zoom and a 4.5× digital zoom combine to create a maximum zoom of 18×; 3-inch (76 mm) LCD screen.

==== E1486TW ====
The E1486TW featured a 14.1 megapixel sensor with 8x optical zoom with a 28mm lens. Rear display is touch enabled, likely giving it the "T" part of the model name ("W" likely referring to the lens being a wide angle lens).

==== E1680W ====
The E1680w features a 16 megapixel CCD sensor with 8x optical zoom with a 28mm lens . 3 inch LCD display.

=== G Series ===
==== G1 ====
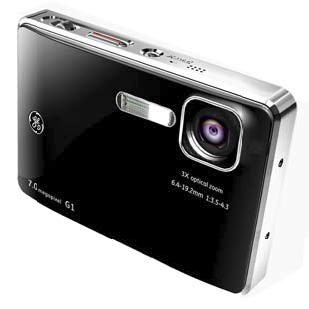
G1

The G1 is the most compact model in the GE-branded line at 3 5/8 inches (92 mm) wide and 2 1/2 inches (64 mm) high. It includes a 3× optical zoom, a 2.5-inch (64 mm) LCD screen, 7 megapixels. Comes with a rechargeable lithium-ion battery and an SD/SDHC memory card slot, expandable up to 4 gigabytes.

==== G100 ====
The G100 is a modified bridge camera featuring an Aptina A-Pix CMOS 14.4-megapixel pixel sensor and a 15× optical zoom lens. 6× digital zoom is also provided for a total maximum zoom of 90×. It has a 3-inch (76 mm), 460K pixel, color LCD. The movie mode offers 1080p30, 720p60, 720p30, VGA, and QVGA Video. It has 15 MB of internal memory. An SD/SDHC/SDXC slot supports up to a 128 GB memory card. The camera is powered by a 3.7 V, 880 mAh, GB-50A, rechargeable lithium-ion battery with in-camera charging.

=== Waterproof series ===
==== G3WP ====
The first camera in GE's waterproof series was the G3WP, a compact camera with capability for up to 3 meters (10 feet) underwater, 12.2-megapixel CCD sensor, "All-Glass" 4× optical zoom f/3.5-5.15 lens, and VGA Video.

==== G5WP ====
Underwater capability 5 meters (16 feet), 12.2-megapixel CCD sensor, "All-Glass" 4× optical zoom f/3.5-5.15 lens.

=== Bridge Cameras ===
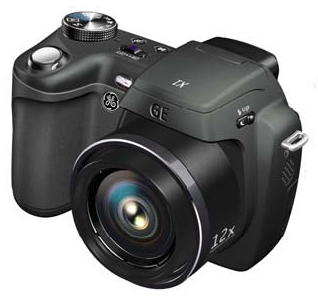
X1

==== X1 ====
GE X1 is the first camera from General Imaging for the more serious photographer. It has a 12× optical zoom, a 2.5-inch (64 mm) LCD screen, 8 megapixels, and a handgrip. Paired with the camera's 12× optical zoom is a 4.5× digital zoom. Together, they give the X1 a maximum zoom of 54×. It also includes a 4-gigabyte SD/SDHC expansion slot.

==== X5 ====
The GE X5 is a bridge camera with a 14 MP CCD sensor, and a 15× optical zoom lens.

==== X500 ====
GE Power Pro X500 is the successor of GE X5. The camera has a 16-megapixel sensor and an electronic viewfinder, whereas the optical zoom and other features are relatively still the same as the predecessor.

On March 15, 2011, the price of the X500 was about $139.99.

==== X550 ====
In 2012, GE Power Pro X550 was introduced with Manufacturer's Suggested Retail Price (MSRP) $149.99 as a minor improvement on the GE Power Pro X500 with added object tracking capabilities to automatically focus on moving objects.

==== X600 ====
GE Power Pro X600 had an MSRP of $199.99 when it was announced in 2012. It has a 14.4 MP CMOS sensor, 26× optical zoom (26–676 mm), and is capable of capturing Full HD 1080p video recording. It can take 7 frames per second of continuous shooting (up to 150 images) without slowdown when using SD card with a transfer rate of at least 95 MB/second. The body shape of the camera is similar to the Panasonic Lumix FZ200 with a deep handgrip, big lens, and eye-level electronic viewfinder. It is more compact than other models with a weight of 12.5 ounces (350 grams). The camera can also take Pancapture panoramic photos, up to six multi successive exposures in one frame, and has 6× digital zoom. It lacks RAW support, stereo sound and does not have a hot shoe. The longest shutter speed the camera supports is four seconds.

==== X2600 ====
GE Power Pro X2600 has an MSRP of $169.99, an optical zoom of 2$1×$1× (the same as the X600), but instead uses a 16 MP CCD sensor. It is larger, heavier, and lacks an electronic viewfinder.

== See also ==
- Digital photography
