= Kiron Corporation =

Photographic equipment manufacturer

- Type: Distributor
- Industry: Photographic lenses and equipment
- Founded: January 25, 1980; 46 years ago
- Defunct: 1988
- Headquarters: 730 E Kingshill Pl, Carson, California
- Products: Kiron lenses
- Owner: Kino Precision Industries, Ltd.

Kiron Corporation was a subsidiary of Kino Precision Industries, Ltd., a Japanese manufacturer of photographic lenses. Kiron was based in Carson, California, operating in the 1980s primarily as the United States distributor of Kiron lenses, which were offered in a variety of mounts compatible with many popular 135 film manual focus single-lens reflex camera systems. Kino Precision was founded in 1959 and by the time Kiron was organized in 1980, Kino Precision had gained experience manufacturing lenses sold by Vivitar, including several marketed under the latter company's premium "Series 1" line. After Kino Precision decided to market lenses directly, the Kiron name was adopted for the lenses and the distributor.

Kiron lenses enjoyed a fine reputation, driven by positive reviews and an award-winning advertising campaign led by Chiat/Day. After 1985, following the introduction and subsequent explosive popularity of autofocus SLRs, the market for manual focus lenses shrank, and Kiron concluded operations by 1988. Its parent, Kino, merged with Melles Griot in 1989.

== History ==
The company was set up as a U.S. subsidiary of Kino Precision Industries Limited, which was a Japanese company based in Nerima, Tokyo, and the first use of the Kiron name was noted in late September 1979. A trademark for Kiron was applied for on January 25, 1980, and registered on July 7, 1981. Kiron Corporation was founded to market manually focused film camera optical lenses to the United States. Kino Precision was founded in 1959 by Tatsuo Kataoka to manufacture lenses for 8mm movie cameras.

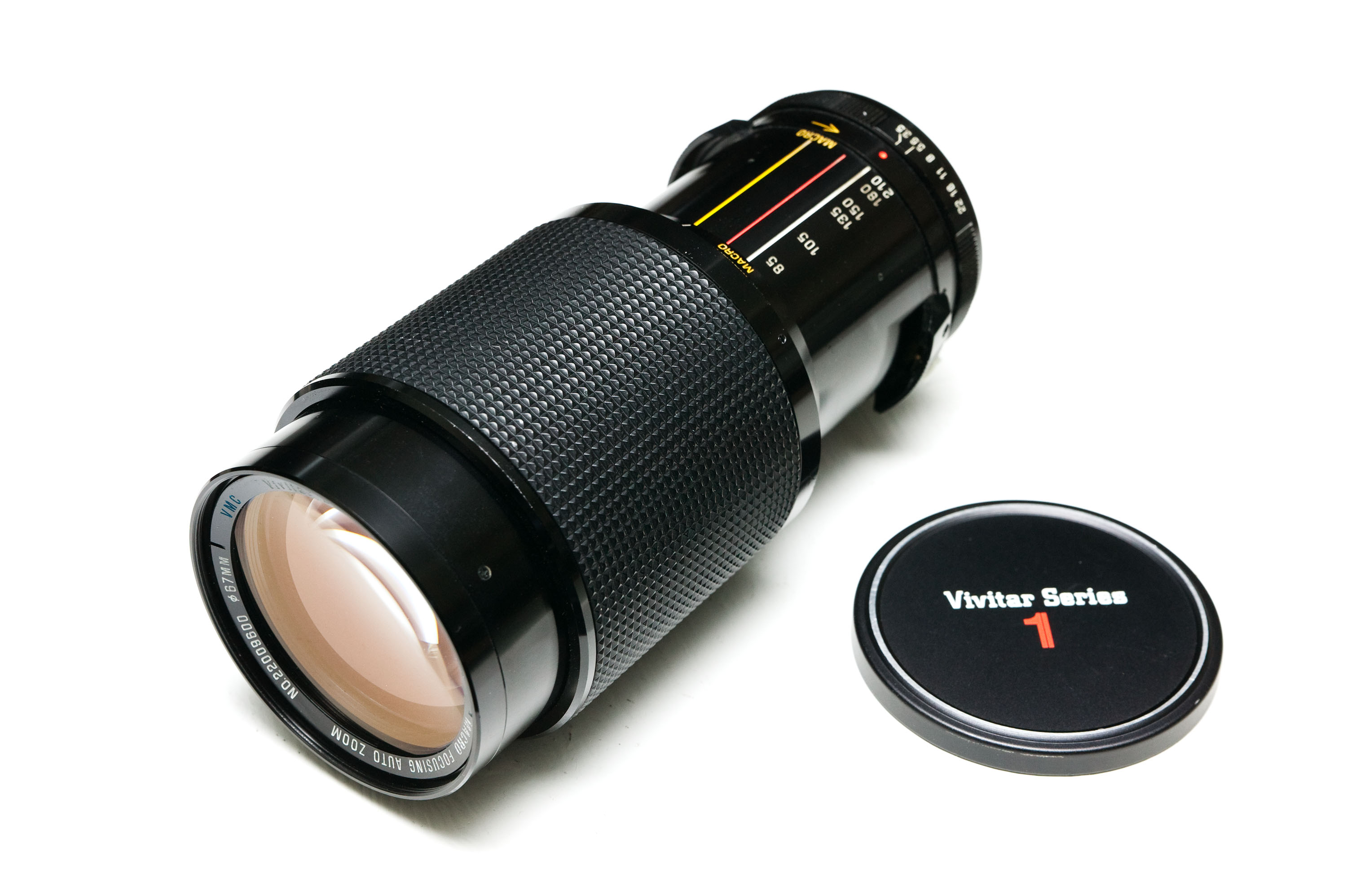
Vivitar Series 1 70-210mm f/3.5, manufactured by Kino Precision Industries

Starting in the early 1970s, Kino Precision manufactured some of the now-famous Series 1 manual focus lenses under contract for Vivitar, a U.S. lens distributor of after-market film lenses for 35mm cameras. These may be identified by serial number, as Vivitar assigned serial numbers starting with '22' to lenses made by Kino. The third, fourth, and fifth digits were used for the year and week of manufacture. Vivitar continued to purchase some Kiron/Kino lens designs, and offered them for sale under the Vivitar brand. For example, the Kiron 105mm f/2.8 macro lens was re-labeled and sold as the Vivitar 100mm f/2.8 macro and the Vivitar 105mm f/2.5 (1:1) macro lenses.

The commercial success of Vivitar Series 1 lenses prompted Kino to directly market lenses to fit existing 35mm Japanese film cameras under their own brand, Kiron, especially as Vivitar was using other manufacturers to produce Vivitar brand lenses. Kiron soon became known as one of the very few after-market lens manufacturers that could supply products equal to or even exceeding the optical and mechanical quality of the original manufacturer. In particular, the Kiron 28mm f/2.0, the 105mm f/2.8 1:1 macro, the 28-210mm f/4.0~5.6 and the f/3.8~5.6 varifocal zoom, and the 28-85mm f/2.8~3.8 varifocal macro zoom lenses were praised in contemporary reviews of the day for their superb optical resolution and clarity, as well as mechanical quality.

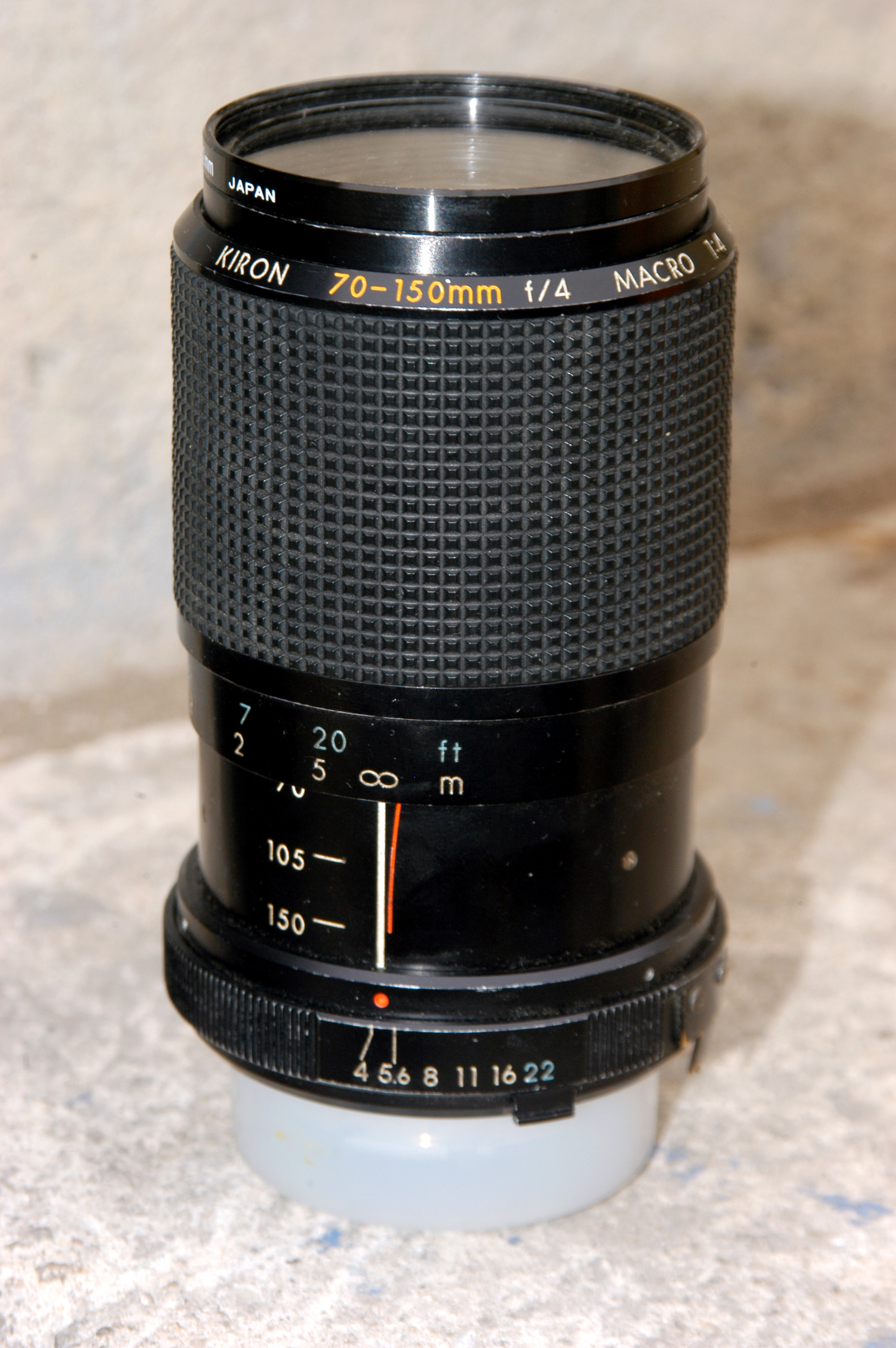
Kiron 70–150mm f/4.0

Although reasonably priced for the level of quality offered, Kiron manual focus lenses were never economy-level products; for example, in 1981, the 28–85 mm f/2.8~3.8 varifocal lens had a list price of US$449 (equivalent to $1,590 in 2025). All Kiron lenses were made and assembled in Japan. As such, Kiron lenses had retail list prices comparable with lenses offered by the camera manufacturers themselves, although in practice, retailers offered Kiron lenses at substantially discounted prices comparable to Sigma, Tamron, Tokina, and Vivitar equivalents. In 1983, Chiat/Day won four excellence in advertising awards presented by The Advertising Club of New York, based on their advertisements for Kiron, Pioneer, Apple, and Allstate.

In addition to lenses, Kiron Corporation also distributed Billingham camera bags and B+W photographic filters in the United States.

The increasing cost of quality lens manufacture in Japan led to a loss of sales for Kiron, as the company could no longer offer its lenses at a cost less than that charged by the camera manufacturers, who had begun to offer economy-level lens designs as well as contracting lens assembly operations in lower-cost factories outside Japan. Additionally, the 35mm camera market was in flux by the late 1980s, and 35mm camera manufacturers were transitioning to autofocus lens designs. By 1988, the company decided to discontinue after-market 35mm camera lens production to concentrate on industrial and other markets.

In 1989 Kino Precision Industries merged with 'Melles Griot Japan' to form 'Kino-Melles Griot'.

In 1995 the firm has changed its name to 'Melles Griot Ltd', and subsequently became a member of CVI Melles Griot Group in 2007.

In June 2011 Illinois-based IDEX Corporation completed its $400 million acquisition of the laser and optical component maker CVI Melles Griot from its previous owner, the private equity firm Norwest Equity Partners.

== Lenses ==
Vivitar-branded lenses manufactured by Kino Precision
| Focal length (mm) | Name | Aperture | Year | Construc. (Ele/Grp) | Min. focus (Mag.) | Filter (mm) | Dia. × Len. | Wgt. | Notes |
|---|---|---|---|---|---|---|---|---|---|
Wide angle lenses
| 24 | 24 mm f/2.0 Compact | f/2–16 | ? | 8/8 | 0.31 m (12 in) (0.11×) | 55 | 64×46 mm (2.5×1.8 in) | 264 g (9.3 oz) | |
| 28 | 28 mm f/2.0 Compact | f/2–16 | ? | 8/8 | 0.30 m (12 in) (0.13×) | 55 | 64×45 mm (2.5×1.8 in) | 250 g (8.8 oz) | |
Telephoto lenses
| 135 | 135 mm f/2.8 | f/2.8–22 | ? | 4/4 | 1.5 m (59 in) (0.11×) | 55 | 64×82 mm (2.5×3.2 in) | 380 g (13 oz) | |
| 200 | 200 mm f/3.5 | f/3.5–22 | ? | 5/4 | 1.8 m (71 in) (0.14×) | 62 | 68×124 mm (2.7×4.9 in) | 595 g (21.0 oz) | |
Wide to telephoto zoom lenses
| 35–85 | Series 1 35–85 mm f/2.8 Variable-Focus | f/2.8–16 | ? | 12/9 | 0.26 m (10 in) (0.29×) | 67 | 81×91 mm (3.2×3.6 in) | 722 g (25.5 oz) | Varifocal |
Telephoto zoom lenses
| 70–150 | 70–150 mm f/3.8 Close-Focusing Zoom | f/3.8–22 | ? | 15/10 | 1.5 m (59 in) (Macro, 0.41 m (16 in), 0.25×) | 52 | 61×112 mm (2.4×4.4 in) | 550 g (19 oz) | Sold with 4e/3g 2× 'Matched Multiplier' |
| 70–150 | 70–150 mm f/3.8 Zoom | f/3.8–22 | ? | 12/9 | 1.5 m (59 in) (Macro, 0.41 m (16 in), 0.25×) | 52 | 65×96.5 mm (2.6×3.8 in) | 435 g (15.3 oz) | |
| 70–210 | Series 1 70–210 mm f/3.5 Macro-Focusing Zoom | f/3.5–22 | 1974 | 15/10 | 0.29 m (11 in) (0.45×) | 67 | 78×158 mm (3.1×6.2 in) | 940 g (33 oz) | |
| 75–205 | 75–205 mm f/3.8 Close-Focusing Zoom | f/3.8–22 | ? | 15/10 | 2 m (79 in) (Macro, 0.43 m (17 in), 0.26×) | 58 | 67×153 mm (2.6×6.0 in) | 787 g (27.8 oz) | |
| 90–180 | Series 1 90–180 mm f/4.5 Flat Field Macro Zoom | f/4.5–22 | ? | 18/12 | 0.69 m (27 in) (0.5×) | 72 | 75×158 mm (3.0×6.2 in) | 1,090 g (38 oz) | |

Kiron-branded lenses for 135 film cameras
| Focal length (mm) | Name | Aperture | Year | Construc. (Ele/Grp) | Min. focus (Mag.) | Filter (mm) | Dia. × Len. | Wgt. | Notes |
|---|---|---|---|---|---|---|---|---|---|
Wide angle lenses
| 24 | 24 mm f/2.0 | f/2–16 | ? | 8/8 | 0.3 m (12 in) | 55 | 65×47 mm (2.6×1.9 in) | 288 g (10.2 oz) | |
| 28 | 28 mm f/2.0 | f/2–16 | ? | ? | 0.3 m (12 in) | 55 | ?×47 mm (1.9 in) | 284 g (10.0 oz) | |
Telephoto lenses
| 105 | 105 mm f/2.8 Macro | f/2.8–32 | ? | 6/6 | 0.45 m (18 in) (1.00×) | 52 | 73×102 mm (2 7/8×4 in) | 645 g (22 3/4 oz) | |
Wide to telephoto zoom lenses
| 28–85 | 28–85 mm f/2.8~3.8 Varifocal | f/2.8~3.8–22 | ? | ? | 0.26 m (10 in) (0.25×) | 67 | 70×105 mm (2.8×4.1 in) | 657 g (23.2 oz) | Varifocal |
| 28–105 | 28–105 mm f/3.2~4.5 Varifocal Macro Focusing Zoom | f/3.2~4.5–22 | Jan 1983 | 15/12 | 0.26 m (10 in) (0.25×) | 67 | 70×112.5 mm (2.8×4.4 in) | 686 g (24.2 oz) | Varifocal |
| 28–210 | 28–210 mm f/4~5.6 zoom | f/4~5.6 | Feb 1985 | 14/11 | 1.1 m (43 in) (Macro @ 210, 0.25×) | 72 | 75×128.7 mm (3.0×5.1 in) | 840 g (30 oz) | Varifocal |
| 35–135 | 35–135 mm f/3.5~4.5 Macro Focusing Zoom | f/3.5~4.5–16~22 | Jan 1983 | 15/11 | 1.25 m (49 in) (Macro @ 35 mm: 0.12 m (5 in), 0.25×) | 62 | 65.6×115 mm (2.6×4.5 in) | 694 g (24.5 oz) | |
Telephoto zoom lenses
| 70–210 | 70–210 mm f/4 Macro Focusing Zoom | f/4–22 | Jul 1982 | ? | 1.3 m (51 in) (0.25×) | 62 | 75×153 mm (3.0×6.0 in) | 820 g (29 oz) | Original version with ZoomLock |
| 70–210 | 70–210 mm f/4 Macro Focusing Zoom | f/4–22 | Jul 1983 | ? | 1.15 m (45 in) (0.25×) | 62 | 75×153 mm (3.0×6.0 in) | 868 g (30.6 oz) | Updated version adds Focustop |
| 70–210 | 70–210 mm f/4.5 zoom | f/4.5–32 | Mar 1985 | ? | 1.08 m (43 in) (0.25×) | 55 | ? | ? | |
| 80–200 | 80–200 mm f/4 zoom | f/4–22 | 1981 | ? | 0.88 m (2.9 ft) | 55 | 65×152 mm (2.6×6.0 in) | 643 g (22.7 oz) | |
| 80–200 | 80–200 mm f/4.5 Macro Focusing Zoom | f/4.5–32 | Jan 1983 | ? | 1.05 m (41 in) (0.25×) | 55 | 64×139.5 mm (2.5×5.5 in) | 624 g (22.0 oz) | ZoomLock |
| 80–200 | 80–200 mm f/4.5 Macro Focusing Zoom | f/4.5–32 | ? | ? | 1.05 m (41 in) (0.25×) | 55 | 64×139.5 mm (2.5×5.5 in) | 588 g (20.7 oz) | non-ZoomLock |

Additional lenses sold by Kiron for 35 mm film cameras include:

- 28mm 1:2.8
- 28–70mm 1:3.5–4.5 (two versions)
- 28–70mm 1:4.0
- 28-210mm 1:3.8-5.6 varifocal zoom (14 elements/11 groups)
- 30–80mm 1:3.5–4.5 varifocal zoom
- 70–150mm 1:4.0

Lenses were made in the following lens mounts:

- Canon FD
- Konica AR
- Minolta SR
- Nikon F AI and AI-S
- Olympus OM
- Rolleiflex QBM
- Pentax K and K_{A}
- Contax/Yashica

Kiron offered a service to change lens mounts at a cost of US$41.50 (equivalent to $150 in 2025) per lens.

Not part of the original range but some lenses (28-210 and 70-210mm f/4.5) were also made available in M42 lens mount in the late 1980s.

== See also ==
- Vivitar
- List of photographic equipment makers
