= Broadcast lens =

Broadcast lens in television industry are lenses used for broadcasting in television studio or on the location/field. The main manufacturers of broadcast lenses are Canon and Fujifilm's Fujinon brand. Broadcast lenses can be box-shaped, which are heavier and for use in limited range or classically shaped, lighter and for portable use.

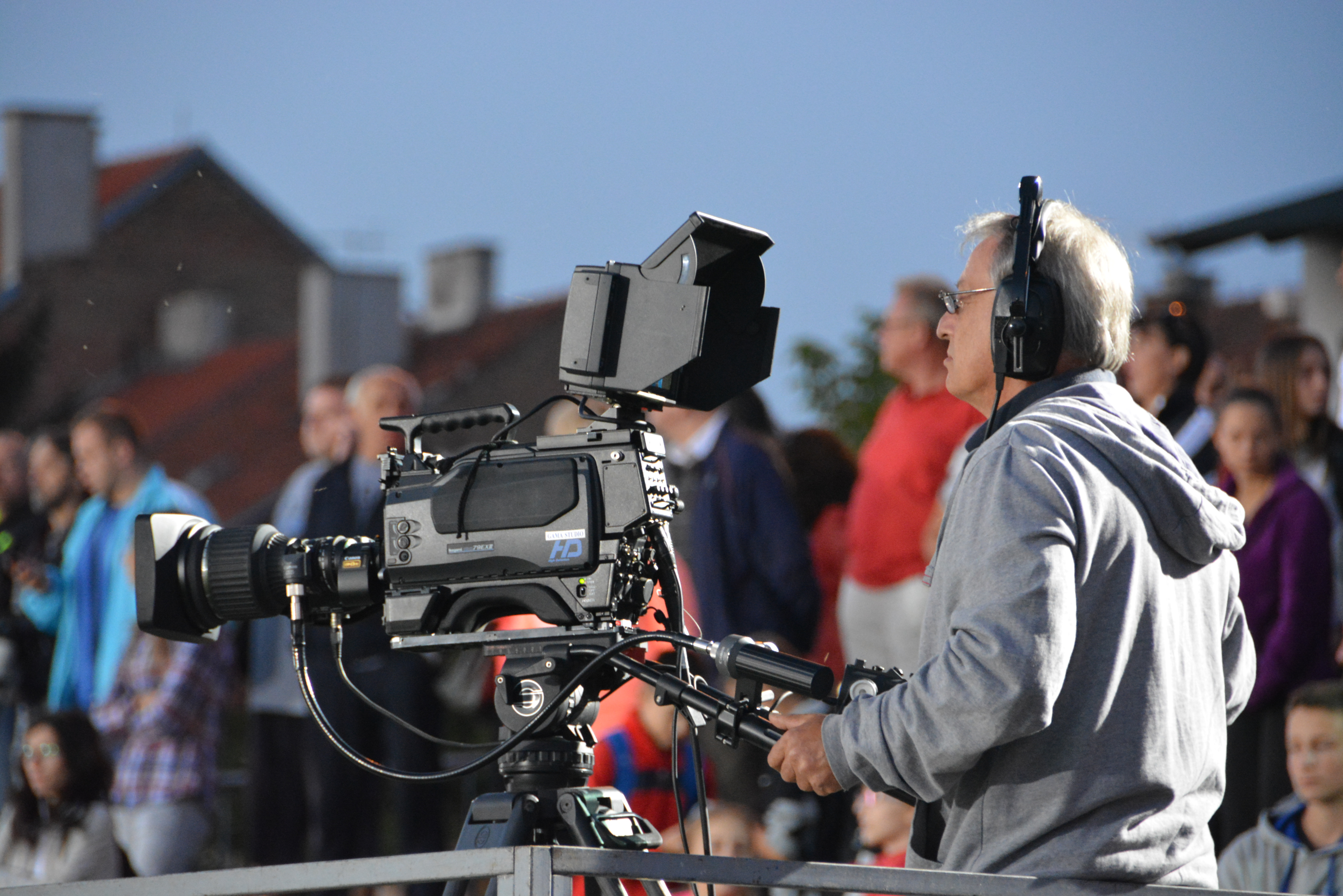
Cameraman operating camera with broadcast lens during a sporting event.

== Types ==
Lens are generally classified into three types:

- Studio zoom lenses, used mainly in the television broadcasting studio.
- Field zoom lenses, used for relay broadcasting of sports and other type of live events.
- Electronic news-gathering/Electronic field production (ENG/EFP) lenses, used for production of news and on-location events.

== Features ==
Typically broadcast lenses have:

- Less focus breathing
- Variable focal lengths (18–35 mm)
- Zoom which maintains focus as the focal length changes (parfocal lens)
- Aspherical lens with fast and large lens aperture
- Servomotor control of zoom, focus and aperture via remote control handles
- Built-in image stabilization
- Multi-group zoom lens system

== See also ==
- Cine lens
- Zoom lens
- Telephoto lens
- Wide-angle lens
- Camera lens
