= Syntax (disambiguation) =

Syntax, in linguistics, is a set of rules governing how words combine to form grammatical meanings.

Syntax may also refer to the following:

- Syntax (journal), a Blackwell Publishing journal devoted to natural language syntax.
- Syntax (logic)
- Syntax (programming languages)
- Syntax (band)
- Syntax (television manufacturer)
- Syntax (typeface)
- SYNTAX, a compiler-generation system

== See also ==
- Syntaxis (disambiguation)
- Sin tax
