= Konica Autoreflex =

Series of 35mm SLR camera models

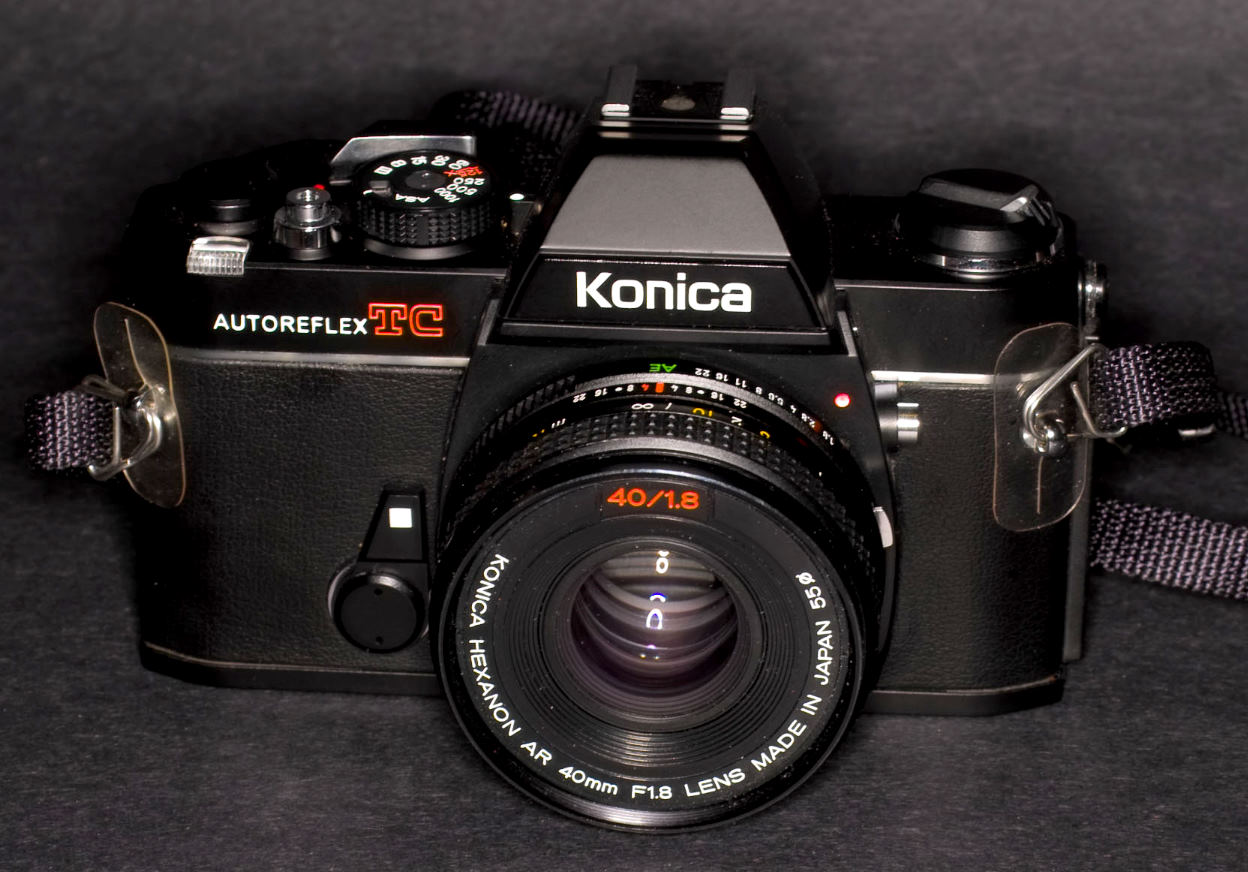
Konica Autoreflex TC (1976–1982)

The Auto-Reflex and Autoreflex is a series of 35mm SLR cameras made by Konica from 1965 to 1988. All these models have the Konica AR bayonet.

== Konica AR-mount ==
Mechanical features of Konica AR-mount lenses

The Konica AR camera lens mount was introduced in 1965 alongside the Konica Auto-Reflex (Autorex for the Japanese market). Konica sold a range of lenses for the AR-mount branded Hexanon, joined later by a budget line branded Hexar. The AR-mount features a relatively short flange focal distance of 40.5 mm for a 35 mm film SLR camera. Its diameter is 47 mm.

The focal lengths offered by Konica ranged from 21 mm to 2000 mm along with a 15 mm fisheye lens; from the start, one zoom, the 47-100mm f3.5 Hexanon AR-H, was offered. In addition, Konica also initially offered a line of Hexanon lenses with preset diaphragm operation, which were optically identical to the preceding Konica F-mount lenses, updated with mechanical interfaces directly compatible with AR-mount cameras. Adapters were available to mount older Konica F-mount lenses on AR-mount bodies.

The Konica AR-mount SLR camera and Hexanon lens lines were discontinued in late 1988.

=== Mount types ===
The AR-mount lenses may be divided into several types, based mostly on cosmetics. When the Autoreflex T was introduced in 1967, Konica added a lever to signal the widest aperture setting for the through-the-lens (TTL) in-body light meter; Konica also offered a free service to retrofit the earliest AR-mount lenses with the new lever.

AR lens mount types
Style	Approximate dates	Cosmetics			Functionality	Notes
Style	Approximate dates	Fixed portion of lens body	Autoexposure setting marked as	Focusing ring	Widest aperture coupling	Notes
1	1965–1967	Chrome	yellow "EE"	All-metal, splined	No	
1T	1968–1969	Chrome	yellow "EE"	All-metal, splined	Yes	Updated with widest aperture signaling lever for TTL metering with Autoreflex T
2E	1970–1973	Black	yellow "EE"	All-metal, splined Rubber inset with fine pyramid pattern	Yes	Changes to focusing ring phased in gradually starting in 1970
2L	1973	Black	green "EE"	Rubber inset with fine pyramid pattern	Yes	"EE" mark color change around 1973
3	1974–1982	Black	green "AE"	Rubber inset with fine pyramid pattern	Yes	Some lenses modified after 1976 (click stops for full stops, instead of half-stops) and 1979 (addition of f/22 settings)
3S	1983–1987	Black	green "AE"	Plastic with fine pyramid pattern	Yes	Further cost reductions starting with introduction of FT-1 & TC-X

Konica AR-mount lens types

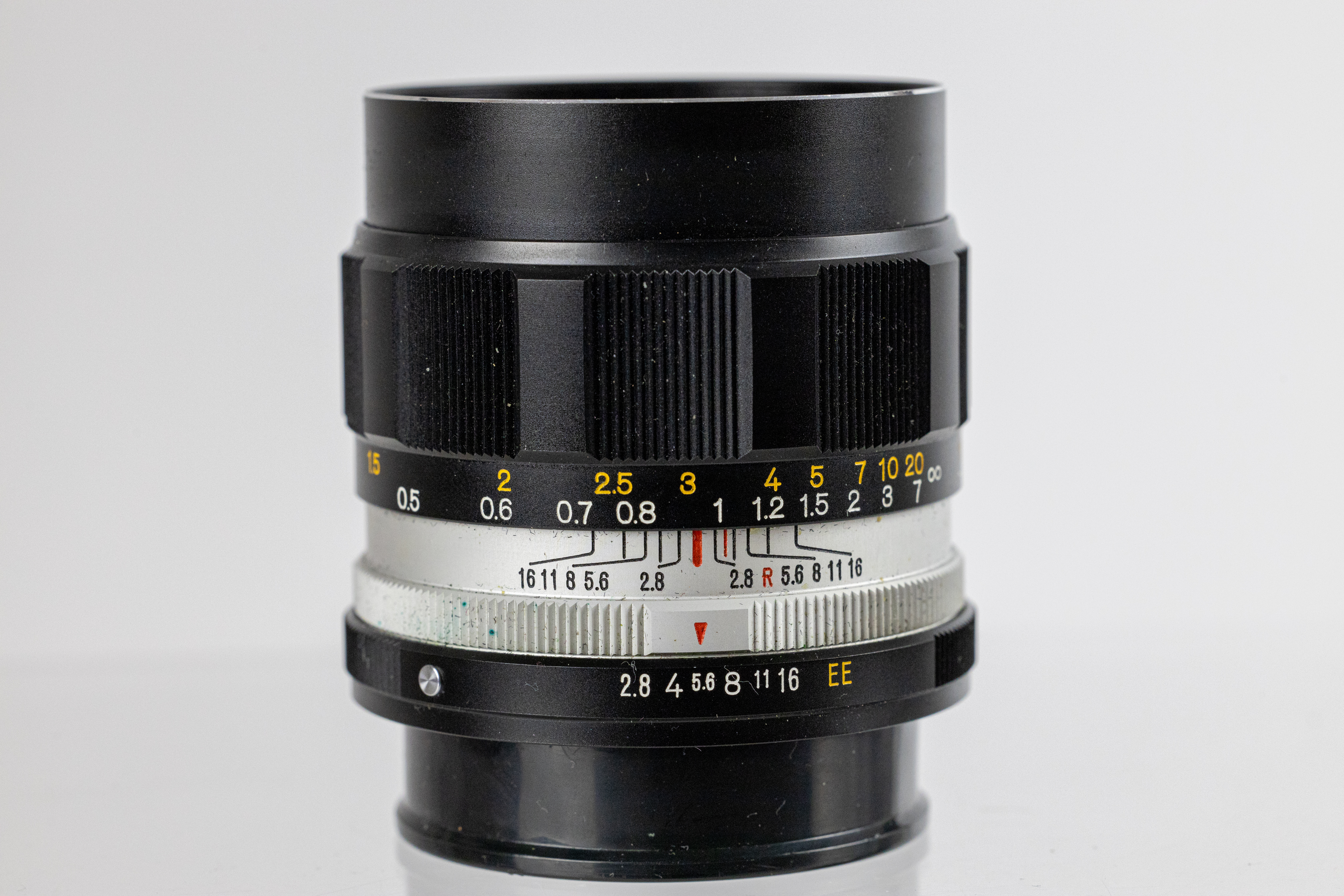
35 mm f/2.8
(style 1 or 1T, c. 1965–1969)

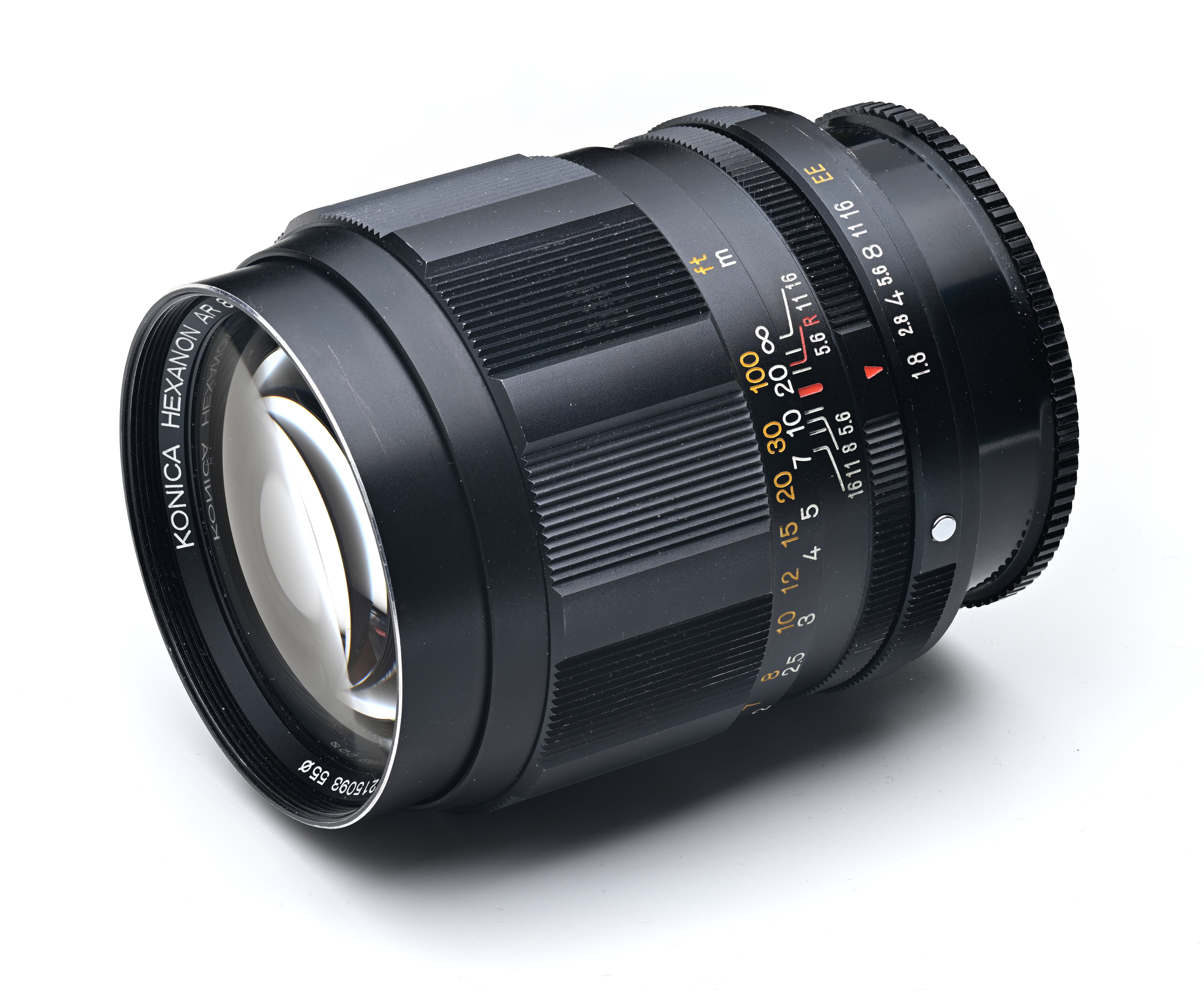
85 mm f/1.8
(style 2E, c. 1970–1973)

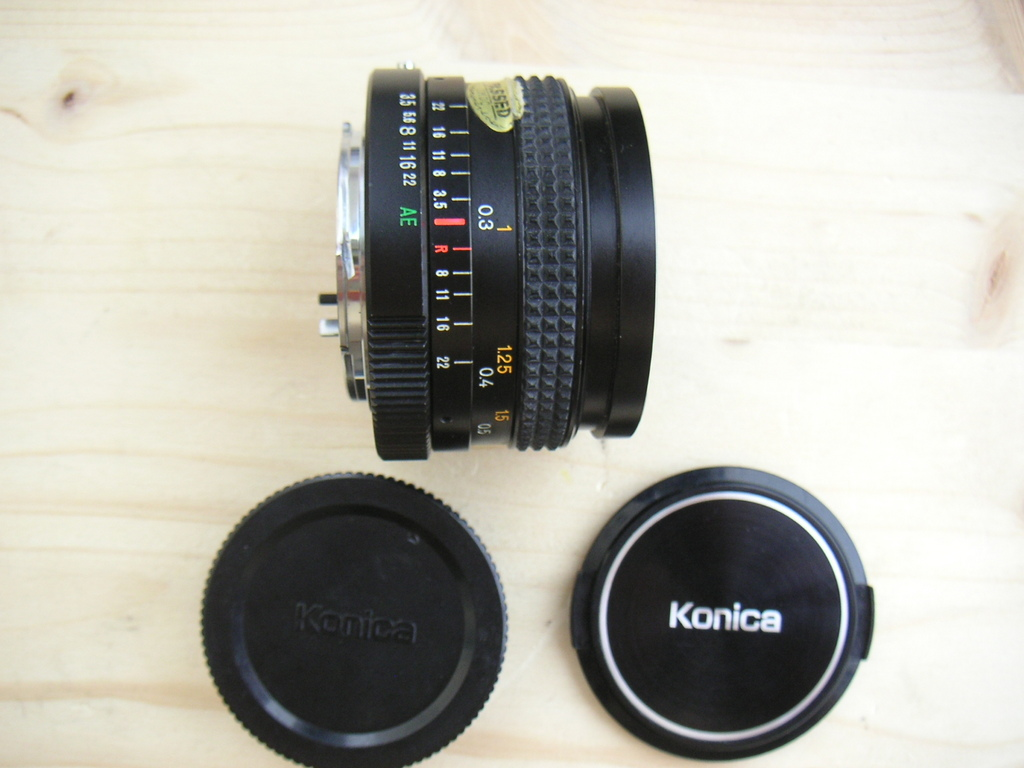
28 mm f/3.5 with caps
(style 3, c. 1974–1982)

=== List of Konica AR-mount lenses ===
Konica Hexanon and Hexar AR-mount lenses
FL (mm)	Ap.	Angle	Ele / Grp	Min. focus	Filt (mm)	Wgt	Dia × Len	Notes
Fisheye lenses
15	f/2.8–16	180°	9/6	0.1 m (5.9 in)	built-in	400 g (14.1 oz)	71×64 mm (2.8×2.5 in)	"UC" (ultra compact) line
Wide angle lenses
21	f/2.8–22	90°	9/8	0.2 m (7.9 in)	55	220 g (7.6 oz)	64×38 mm (2.5×1.5 in)	
21	f/4–16	90°	11/7	0.2 m (7.9 in)	77	340 g (12.0 oz)	81×58 mm (3.2×2.3 in)	
24	f/2.8–16	84°	8/8	0.2 m (9.8 in)	55	280 g (9.9 oz)	64×53 mm (2.5×2.1 in)	
28	f/1.8–16	75°	8/8	0.2 m (7.1 in)	55	390 g (13 3/4 oz)	66×64 mm (2.6×2.5 in)	"UC" (ultra compact) line
28	f/3.5	75°	?	?	?	?	?	Preset diaphragm
28	f/3.5–16	75°	7/7	0.3 m (11.8 in)	55	210 g (7.4 oz)	64×43 mm (2.5×1.7 in)	
28	f/3.5–16	75°	5/5	0.3 m (11.8 in)	55	190 g (6.7 oz)	64×38 mm (2.5×1.5 in)	Hexar
35	f/2–16	63°	9/7	0.3 m (11.8 in)	55	320 g (11.3 oz)	66×56 mm (2.6×2.2 in)	
35	f/2.8–16	63°	6/5	0.6 m (24 in)	55	240 g (8.5 oz)	?	Preset diaphragm
35	f/2.8–16	63°	6/5	0.3 m (11.8 in)	55	240 g (8.5 oz)	64×56 mm (2.5×2.2 in)	
Normal lenses
40	f/1.8–22	56°	6/5	0.4 m (17.7 in)	55	140 g (4.9 oz)	64×28 mm (2.5×1.1 in)	
50	f/1.4–16	46°	7/6	0.4 m (17.7 in)	55	290 g (10.2 oz)	66×46 mm (2.6×1.8 in)	
50	f/1.7–16	46°	6/5	0.4 m (17.7 in)	55	240 g (8.5 oz)	66×46 mm (2.6×1.8 in)	
50	f/1.8	46°	?	?	55	?	?	
52	f/1.8–16	45°	6/5	0.4 m (17.7 in)	55	220 g (7 3/4 oz)	?	
57	f/1.2–16	42°	7/6	0.4 m (17.7 in)	55	460 g (16.2 oz)	71×51 mm (2.8×2.0 in)	
57	f/1.4–16	42°	6/5	0.4 m (17.7 in)	55	280 g (10 oz)	?	
Portrait lenses
85	f/1.8–16	28 1/2°	6/5	1.0 m (39.4 in)	55	390 g (13.8 oz)	66×69 mm (2.6×2.7 in)	
100	f/2.8–16	24°	5/4	1.0 m (39.4 in)	55	290 g (10.2 oz)	64×61 mm (2.5×2.4 in)	
135	f/2.5–16	18°	4/4	1.2 m (47.2 in)	62	650 g (23.0 oz)	69×97 mm (2.7×3.8 in)	
135	f/3.2–16	18°	5/4	1.0 m (39.4 in)	55	390 g (13.8 oz)	64×94 mm (2.5×3.7 in)	
135	f/3.5	18°	4/4	1.8 m (6 ft)	55	?	?	Preset diaphragm
135	f/3.5–16	18°	4/4	1.5 m (60 in)	55	550 g (19.5 oz)	64×94 mm (2.5×3.7 in)	Hexar
135	f/3.5–16	18°	4/4	1.5 m (59.1 in)	55	310 g (11.1 oz)	64×81 mm (2.5×3.2 in)	
Telephoto lenses
200	f/3.5–16	12°	5/4	2.5 m (8.2 ft)	67	880 g (31.0 oz)	74×147 mm (2.9×5.8 in)	
200	f/3.5	12°	5/5	2.7 m (9 ft)	72	990 g (35 oz)	?	Preset diaphragm
200	f/4.0–22	12°	5/5	2.5 m (8.2 ft)	55	520 g (18.2 oz)	66×122 mm (2.6×4.8 in)	
200	f/4.0–16	12°	4/4	2.5 m (8.2 ft)	55	800 g (28.3 oz)	74×147 mm (2.9×5.8 in)	Hexar
200	f/5.6	12°	6/4	2.5 m (8.2 ft)	?	340 g (12 oz)	?	Preset diaphragm
300	f/4.5–16	8°	8/5	4.0 m (13.1 ft)	72	960 g (34.0 oz)	81×168 mm (3.2×6.6 in)	
300	f/6.3–22	8°	9/5	4.5 m (14.8 ft)	55	560 g (19.8 oz)	66×147 mm (2.6×5.8 in)	Fluorite elements
400	f/4.5–45	6°	4/4	8.0 m (26.3 ft)	55	2.4 kg (5.3 lb)	100×350 mm (4.1×13.9 in)	Manual diaphragm
400	f/5.6–45	6°	9/5	4.0 m (13.1 ft)	77	1,600 g (56 oz)	84×216 mm (3.3×8.5 in)	"UC" (ultra compact) line
800	f/8.0–45	3°	2/1	20.0 m (65.6 ft)	55	5.6 kg (12.4 lb)	130×770 mm (5.3×30.5 in)	Manual diaphragm
1000	f/8.0–45	2 1/2°	7/6	25.0 m (82.0 ft)	55	8.5 kg (18.7 lb)	200×450 mm (7.9×17.9 in)	Reflex lens
2000	f/11	1 1/4°	9/8	30.5 m (100 ft)	55	17.7 kg (39 lb)	?	Reflex lens
Zoom lenses
28–135	f/4\4.6–22\26	75–18°	18/12	0.5–1.5 m (1.6–4.9 ft)	67	800 g (28 oz)	?	
35–70	f/3.5–22	63–34°	9/9	0.4 m (1.2 ft)	55	470 g (16.6 oz)	66×97 mm (2.6×3.8 in)	
35–100	f/2.8–16	63–24°	15/10	0.3 m (10.6 in)	82	1,100 g (38.8 oz)	86×140 mm (3.4×5.5 in)	Varifocal design
45–100	f/3.5–16	52–24°	11/10	0.4 m (13.8 in)	55	580 g (20.6 oz)	71×89 mm (2.8×3.5 in)	"UC" (ultra compact) line
47–100	f/3.5–16	49–24°	13/8	1.85 m (6.1 ft)	52	435 g (15.3 oz)	?	
58–400	f/4–32	41–6°	14/9	5.0 m (16 ft 5 in)	55	4.3 kg (9.5 lb)	?	Manual aperture
65–135	f/4.0–16	36–18°	13/9	1.5 m (59.1 in)	55	600 g (21.2 oz)	66×127 mm (2.6×5.0 in)	
70–230	f/3.5	34–11°	?	?	?	?	?	Preset diaphragm
80–200	f/3.5–16	31–12°	17/10	1.8 m (6 ft)	67	1,200 g (2 lb 9 oz)	?×197 mm (7.8 in)	
80–200	f/4.0–16	31–12°	14/10	0.7 m (27.6 in)	62	840 g (29.5 oz)	69×157 mm (2.7×6.2 in)	"UC" (ultra compact) line
80–200	f/4.0	31–12°	?	?	55	?	?	
Teleconverters
2×	×2	1/2×	6/5	Same	—N/a	230 g (8.1 oz)	64×43 mm (2.5×1.7 in)	Generally suited for lenses ≥ 100 mm; with shorter lenses, stop down to f/5.6 or smaller.
Macro lenses
55	f/3.5–22	43°	4/3	0.2 m (8.7 in)	55	290 g (10.2 oz)	64×61 mm (2.5×2.4 in)	
105	f/4.0–22	23°	5/3	0.7 m (28.0 in)	55	230 g (8.1 oz)	64×48 mm (2.5×1.9 in)	Requires accessory bellows or Konica Auto Helicoid; min. focus given with Helicoid.

== Konica AR-mount SLR cameras ==
Konica AR-mount SLR cameras
Gen	Name			Img	Intro	Disc	1/2-frame switchable	Meter	AE	Shutter			Dimensions	
Gen	US	JP	EU	Img	Intro	Disc	1/2-frame switchable	Meter	AE	Type	Speeds	Synch	Wgt	W×H×D
1	Auto-Reflex	Autorex	Revue Auto-Reflex		1965	1968	Yes	non-TTL CdS	S	Mech.	B+1-1/1000 s	1/125 s	675 g (23.8 oz)	145.5×94.5×45 mm (5.73×3.72×1.77 in)
1	Auto-Reflex P	Autorex P	Revue SP		1966	1968	Yes	Accessory	—N/a	Mech.	B+1-1/1000 s	1/125 s	685 g (24.2 oz)	145.5×94.5×45 mm (5.73×3.72×1.77 in)
2	Autoreflex T	FTA	Revue TTL		1968	1970	No	TTL, 2×CdS	S	Mech.	B+1-1/1000 s	1/125 s	780 g (28 oz)	150×95×45 mm (5.91×3.74×1.77 in)
2	Autoreflex A				1968	1971	No	TTL, 2×CdS	S	Mech.	B+1-1/500 s	1/125 s	740 g (26 oz)	150×95×45 mm (5.91×3.74×1.77 in)
3	Autoreflex T2	New FTA	—N/a		1970	1973	No	TTL, 2×CdS	S	Mech.	B+1-1/1000 s	1/125 s	740 g (26 oz)	150×95×45 mm (5.91×3.74×1.77 in)
3	Autoreflex A2				1971	1972	No	TTL, 2×CdS	S	Mech.	B+1-1/500 s	1/125 s	740 g (26 oz)	150×95×45 mm (5.91×3.74×1.77 in)
3	Autoreflex A1000				1972	1973	No	TTL, 2×CdS	S	Mech.	B+1-1/1000 s	1/125 s	740 g (26 oz)	150×95×45 mm (5.91×3.74×1.77 in)
4	Autoreflex T3				1973	1975	No	TTL, 2×CdS	S	Mech.	B+1-1/1000 s	1/125 s	740 g (26 oz)	150×95×45 mm (5.91×3.74×1.77 in)
4	Autoreflex A3				1973	?	No	TTL, 2×CdS	S	Mech.	B+1-1/1000 s	1/125 s	685 g (24.2 oz)	150×95×45 mm (5.91×3.74×1.77 in)
4	Autoreflex T3N				1975	1978	No	TTL, 2×CdS	S	Mech.	B+1-1/1000 s	1/125 s	740 g (26 oz)	150×96×45 mm (5.91×3.78×1.77 in)
5	Autoreflex TC	ACOM-1	—N/a		1976	1982	No	TTL, 2×CdS	S	Mech.	B+1/8-1/1000 s	1/125 s	510 g (18 oz)	136×90×45 mm (5.35×3.54×1.77 in)
5	Autoreflex T4				1978	1979	No	TTL, 2×CdS	S	Mech.	B+1-1/1000 s	1/125 s	530 g (19 oz)	136×90×45 mm (5.35×3.54×1.77 in)
6	FS-1				1979	1983	No	TTL, 2×GaAs	S	Elec.	B+2-1/1000 s	1/100 s	560 g (20 oz)	146×90×46 mm (5.75×3.54×1.81 in)
6	FC-1				1980	1983	No	TTL, 2×GaAs	S	Elec.	B+2-1/1000 s	1/100 s	515 g (18.2 oz)	140×89×45 mm (5.51×3.50×1.77 in)
6	FP-1				1981	1983	No	TTL, 2×CdS	P only	Elec.	1/30-1/1000 s	1/100 s	495 g (17.5 oz)	140×89×45 mm (5.51×3.50×1.77 in)
6	FT-1				1983	1987	No	TTL, SPD	S	Elec.	B+2-1/1000 s	1/100 s	570 g (20 oz)	143×91×46 mm (5.63×3.58×1.81 in)
6	TC-X				1985	1987	No	TTL, 2×CdS	S	Elec.	B+1/8-1/1000 s	1/100 s	375 g (13.2 oz)	130×84×45 mm (5.12×3.31×1.77 in)

=== Konica Auto-Reflex, Autorex, and Revue Auto-Reflex ===
The Konica Auto-Reflex of 1965 was the first focal-plane-shutter auto exposure 35mm SLR; hence the name. This model and its rarer, meterless companion the Konica Auto-Reflex P are the only models where "Auto-Reflex" is hyphenated. These are also the only two SLRs that ever offered a choice of full- or half-frame exposures, switched by a lever on top of the camera. The frame size can be changed between 24×36 landscape and 18×24 portrait in mid-roll.

Autorex is the name for the domestic Japanese market. In Germany the camera was also sold as Revue Auto-Reflex.

For the Auto-Reflex, the meter sensor is mounted on the front, right-hand side of the camera. This is not TTL metering, although it does offer a shutter-preferred, auto-exposure mode. TTL auto exposure appeared in a Konica a few years later, with the Autoreflex T (FTA in Japan).

It has the new Konica Bayonet II mount, which is also often called K/AR mount. PX675 type mercury batteries are only needed for the light meter. Shutter speeds run from 1s to 1/1000 and B.

Lenses, Konica named them Hexanon, with focal lengths from 21 mm to 1000 mm and a 47-100mm f3.5 Hexanon AR-H were offered; additionally a bellows and an angle viewfinder.

All versions of this model were available in both matte chrome and all-black finishes. All-black cameras are considerably rarer and tend to be more valuable.

Lenses offered with the Auto-Reflex/Autorex are a bit unusual, too. They originally did not have a registration notch on the rear, which was needed with latter TTL metered models but was unnecessary on this model. The notch tells the camera the lens' maximum aperture. At the time the later models were introduced, many Auto-Reflex/FTA lenses were sent in for a service upgrade to modify them for use with the TTL models. For a period of time, factory service facilities performed this service for free. The result is that un-modified original Auto-Reflex/Autorex lenses are somewhat unusual today.

Also, normal lenses sold with the Revue version of this camera were often unlabelled, fitted with a plain finish ring that did not have the Hexanon name on it.

Konishiroku apparently did not rebrand any of their K/AR mount SLR models for sale through Montgomery Ward in the United States, as they had with the FP in the earlier mount. They did continue to market a number of rebadged rangefinder cameras through Wards, however (EEMatic and Auto S models, for example).

=== Konica Auto-Reflex P, Autorex P, and Revue Auto-Reflex SP ===
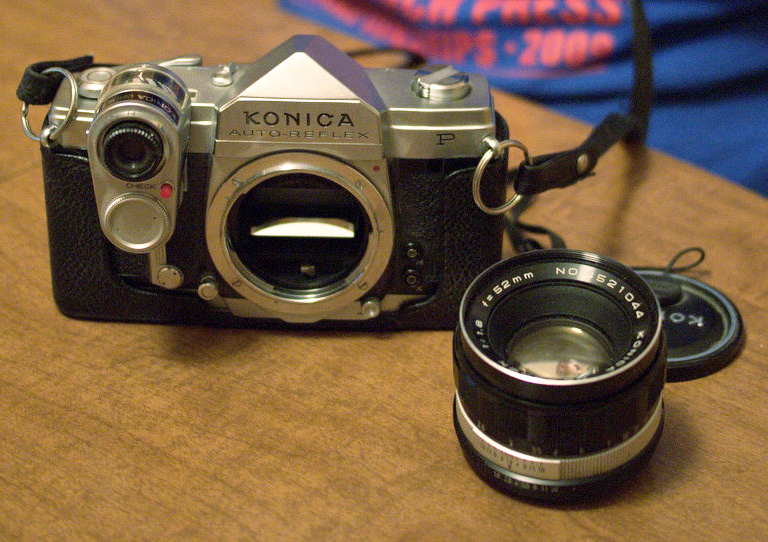
Konica Auto-Reflex P w/lens and light meter

The Konica Auto-Reflex P is basically a stripped-down Auto-Reflex without light meter and therefore without auto-exposure. In Japan it was sold as Autorex P, in Germany as the Revue Auto-Reflex SP.

It is fully mechanical and therefore does not have batteries. The shutter speeds are the same: 1s to 1/1000 and B. As with the Auto-Reflex, the frame size can be switched between 24×36mm landscape and 18×24mm portrait mid-roll.

There is a special accessory light meter offered for use with the P models.

It is believed all versions of these models were only offered in matte chrome finish.

There is in existence a black finish Konica Auto-Reflex P camera which has just come to light. Serial number 857560. This camera is in full working order and good cosmetic condition. Picture can be made available.

=== Autoreflex T, FTA, and Revue TTL ===
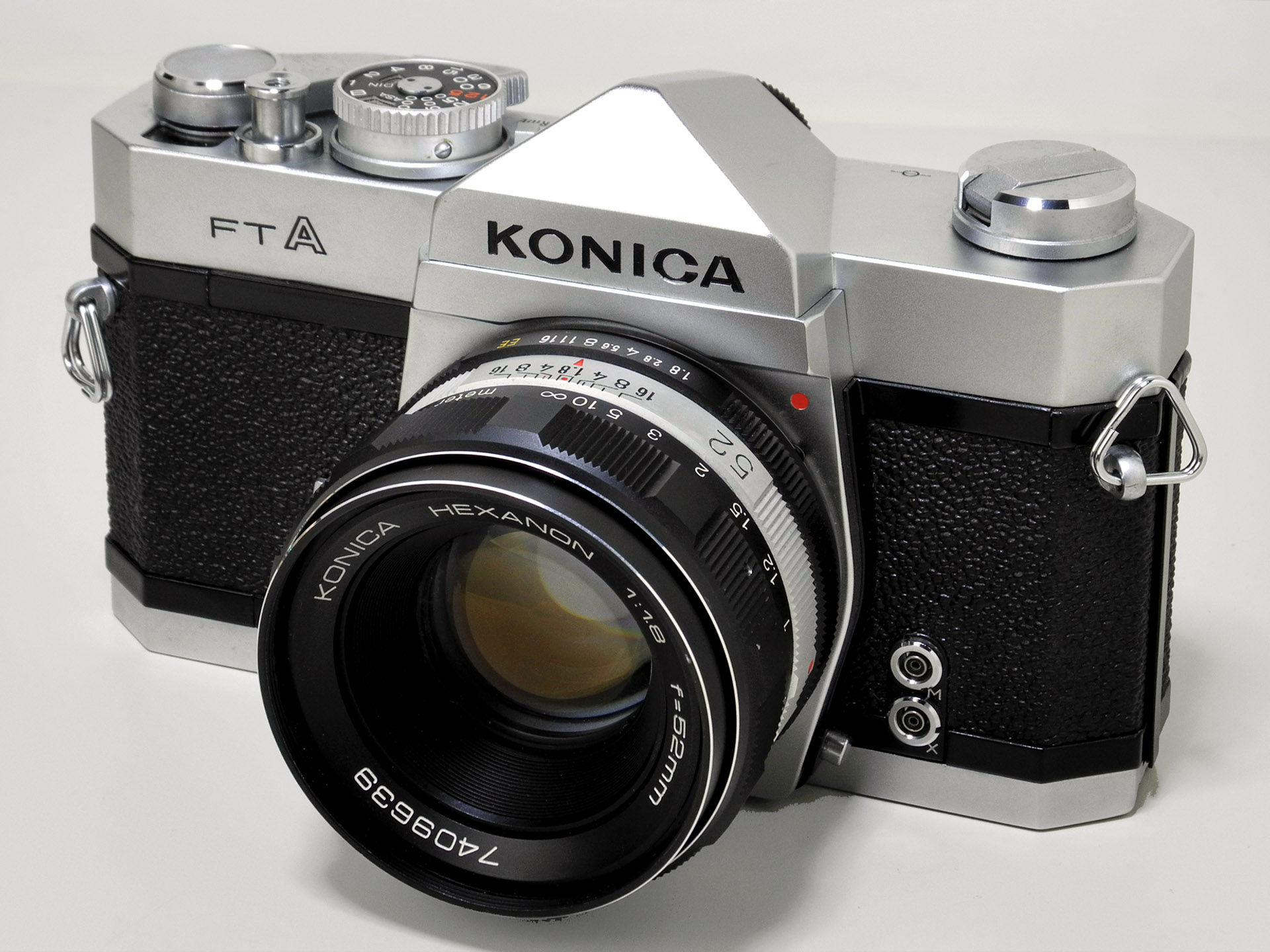
FTA (identical to Autoreflex T)

The Autoreflex T was the first focal plane shutter 35mm SLR with auto-exposure and TTL metering combined in one body. In Japan it was sold as FTA, in Germany as Revue Autoreflex TTL.

It is fully mechanical with shutter-priority auto exposure. The batteries (two PX 675 type mercury cells) were only needed for the CdS light meter. The shutter speed range was from 1s to 1/1000 and B.

There is one rare and special version of this model, known as the Autoreflex W. This is a camera fitted with a special timing back, for use at sporting events. It imprints the time of the exposure on each frame of film. The back is similar in function to the one offered in 1963 on the Konica FS-W, an F/FS mount camera.

=== Autoreflex A ===
The Autoreflex A is a stripped-down Autoreflex T without self-timer, mirror lock-up, depth-of-field preview, on/off-switch, and battery control, and with 1/500 top shutter speed.

=== Autoreflex T2 and New FTA ===
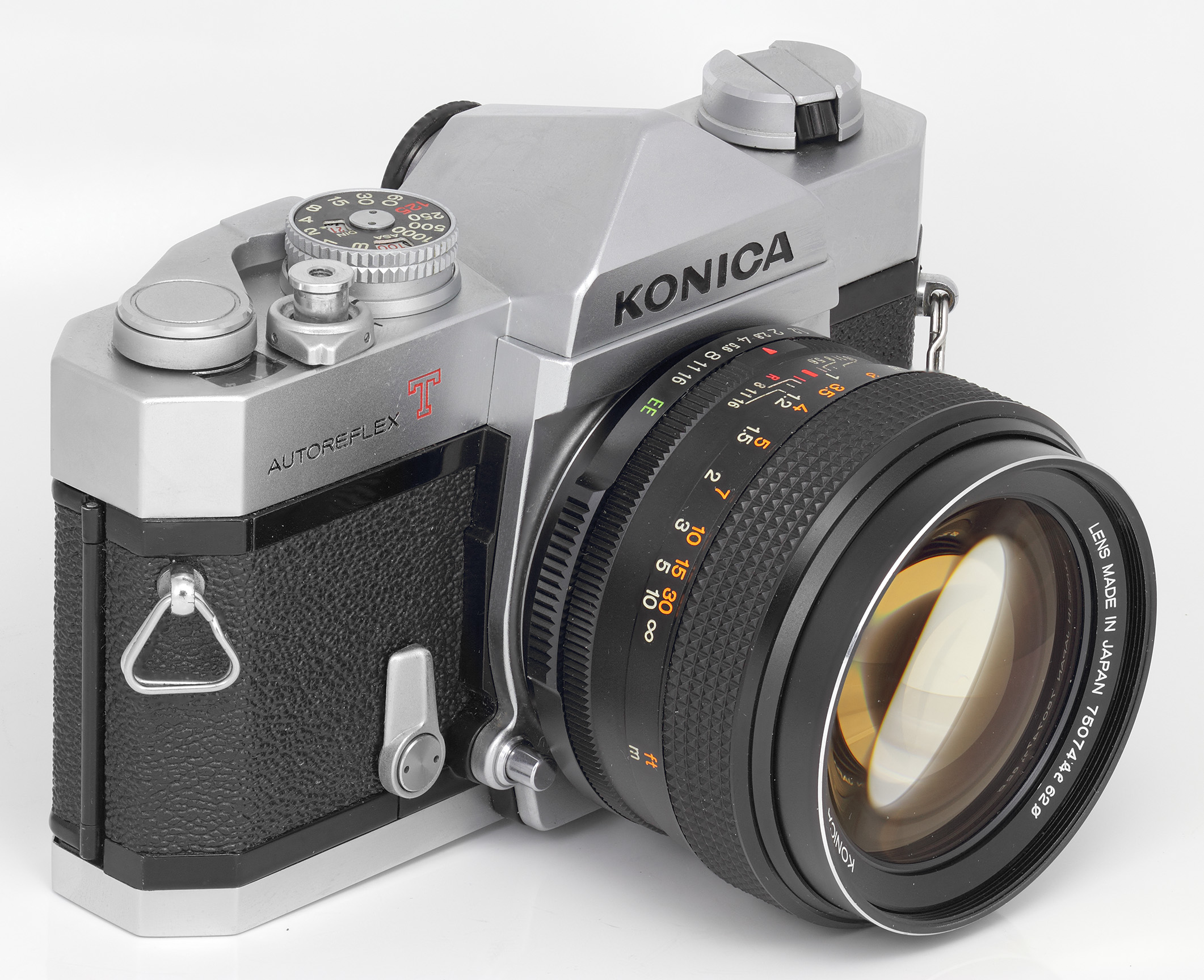
Konica Autoreflex T2 (1970–1973) with Hexanon 57mm F1.2

The Autoreflex T2 is an improved Autoreflex T. The model name on the body still says "Autoreflex T". In Japan it was sold as "New" FTA. Both the versions of T and FTA were hugely successful and are still widely found today. These models might be considered the SLRs that truly established Konica's reputation for quality. Many of both versions continue to function well 35 or more years after they were manufactured.

The most recognizable differences between the T1 and T2 (and FTA and "New" FTA) is that the latter has the on/off switch as a small collar that rotates around the shutter release button. On the earlier camera, the switch was located on the back, left-hand side. Also omitted from the later camera is a small lever under the shutter speed dial labeled "Override" on the earlier camera. This change shows the improved range of the meter sensitivity, and the override capability was no longer considered necessary.

The T2/"New" FTA also saw a number of small, internal changes in the materials used and methods of assembly. This was largely to make the camera more easily serviced. For example, where some brass screws were used originally, these were replaced with stronger steel screws that were less inclined to strip or snap off when being removed.

Although the names T2 or "New" FTA never actually appeared on the outside of the camera, there were references to the model designation in Konishiroku memos and literature at the time. Service bulletins, for example, distinguished the later cameras from the earlier by reference to these model designations. Also, note that the next model offered was known as the Autoreflex T3.

One small flaw found in Autoreflex T is the battery compartment. It appears the wrong type of flux was used when soldering the wire connections. This makes the wire and solder more vulnerable to any battery leakage, more prone to corrosion. The fix is simple, though. Perhaps 9 out of 10 times an Autoreflex T with a non-responsive meter can be easily repaired with a little cleaning and soldering.

Both the Autoreflex T"2" and "New" FTA can be found in both matte chrome and all black finishes. The black versions are rarer and more valuable.

There was also an optional split image focus assist screen available on a few of this model. Up to now, the Konica K/AR cameras all had matte focus screens with a micro-diaprism dot in the center to help with focus. The split focus assist feature is not interchangeable by the user (the way some camera's focus screens are), and is pretty rare. (Note: In the earlier F/FS mount, Konica has similar screens with matte field and a central micro-diaprism dot, except for the highly valued and rare Konica F which not only had an interchangeable pentaprism, but also had the split image focus assist feature.)

=== Autoreflex A2 ===
The Autoreflex A2 is an improved Autoreflex A or stripped-down Autoreflex T2 without self-timer, mirror lock-up, depth-of-field preview, on/off-switch, and battery control, and with 1/500 top shutter speed. The engravings still say Autoreflex A.

=== Autoreflex A1000 ===
The Autoreflex A1000 is an improved Autoreflex A2 or stripped-down Autoreflex T2, with a top shutter speed of 1/1000, but without self-timer, on/off switch, depth-of-field preview, and mirror lock-up. It was sold only in the USA.

=== Autoreflex T3 and T3N ===
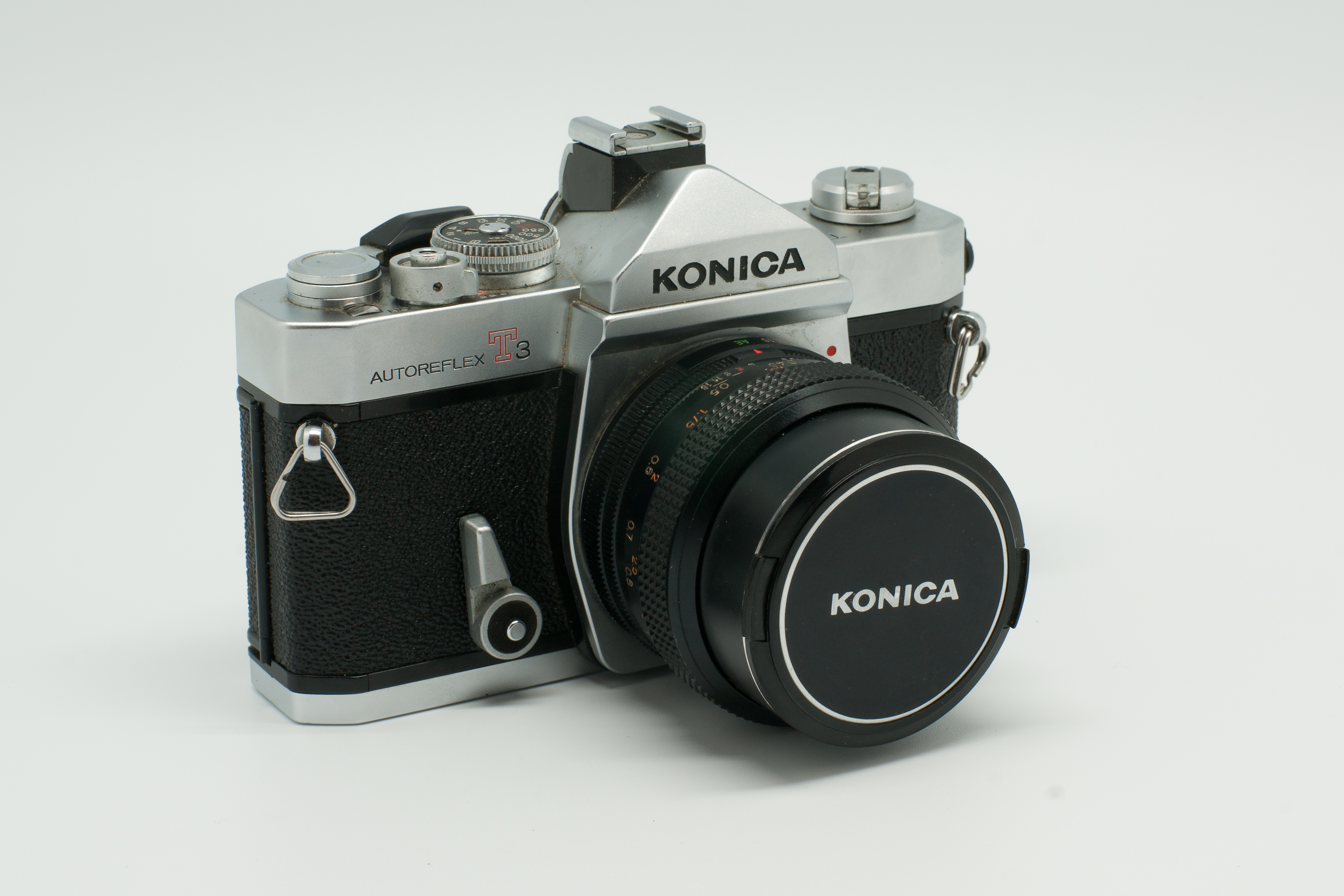
Autoreflex T3 (1973–1978, T3N included)

The Autoreflex T3 is an improved Autoreflex T2, It moves the depth-of-field (DOF) preview (aperture-stop-down) function to the self-timer lever (push lever towards lens for stop-down, push button on lever-hub and turn lever counter-clockwise to set the self-timer; the T2 DOF preview function was activated by a single function button located on the lower lens mount, activated by the photographer's right hand), and adds a Multiple Exposure (M.E.) switch integrated with the shutter-speed dial used in combination with the cocking-indicator (indicator green means shutter is cocked, red means it isn't), as well as a wider range of selectable film-speeds (ISO 12–3200). As with the T2, both the aperture and shutter speed setting are visible in the viewfinder, which has improved brightness compared to earlier models. This model has its serial-number engraved in the top-plate's rear below the wind-lever and a stamped and painted "T-3" between the rewind-lever and prism-bump on the top (note the dash here vs. no dash on the front of the camera).

The Autoreflex T3"N" or "New" introduces iterative enhancements by replacing the earlier version's accessory hot-shoe with a fixed hot-shoe, adding a viewfinder-ocular shutter, and an optional split-image focusing-screen (that feature being indicated by a round sticker with a large letter "S" and the caption "split image" below the rewind-crank next to the viewfinder ocular on the top back of the camera). The T3N's serial number is painted and moves to the top of the top-plate between the rewind-lever and prism-bump.

If the Autoreflex T/FTA and T"2"/"New" FTA established Konica SLR as a brand, the T3 and T3"N" took this to a higher level. It is a redesigned camera with a number of improvements. The T3/T3"N" are described as "buttery smooth" in operation by some users. It is also the last of the all-metal, full-size Konica models. Many remain in use today despite having little or no service attention over 30 or more years of use.

Both T3 and T3"N" can be found in either matte chrome and black enamel finish to its top and bottom plates, with the black version being rarer and more valuable.

In the final year or two of production, another version of the optional split-image focusing-screen became available, which featured the split image dot in the center and a "donut" of micro-diaprisms around that, both of which were in the center of the matte focus screen. Models fitted with the special screen feature had a small silver tag stuck on the back with "S.I." printed on it. The final version of focus screen became the standard on all subsequent Konica models (TC, T4, FP-1, FT-1, etc.)

=== Autoreflex A3 ===
The "Autoreflex A3" is a stripped-down Autoreflex T3 without self-timer, depth-of-field preview, mirror lock-up, multi-exposure provision, on/off switch, battery control, M flash synch, and hot shoe. It replaced the A"2" and A1000 as an entry-level model, but now built on a chassis shared with the T3.

=== Autoreflex T4 ===
The Autoreflex T4 looks similar to the simpler Autoreflex TC. Both are smaller than the earlier Autoreflex bodies, use plastic top plate, but retain a metal frame.

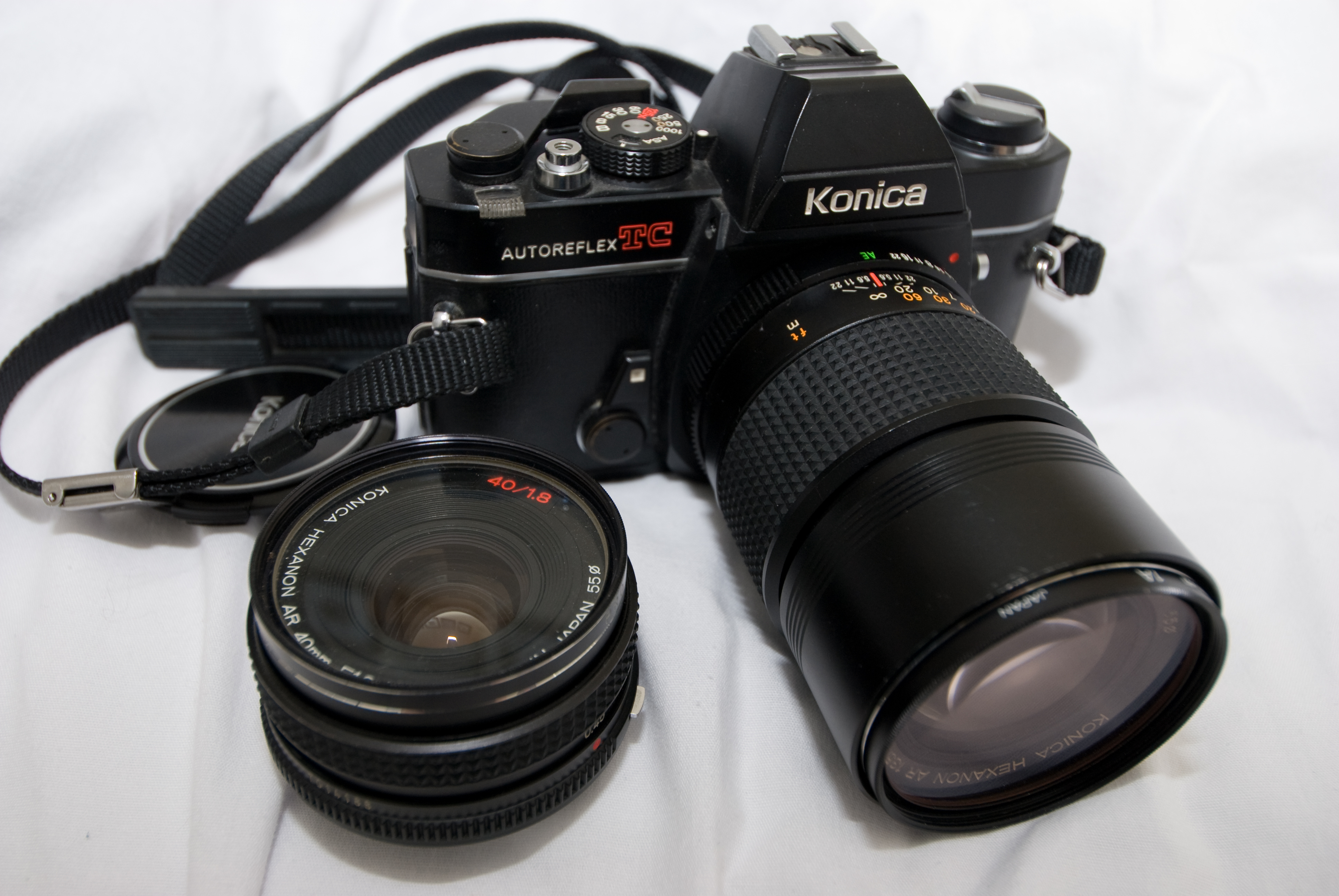
Konica Autoreflex TC (1976–1982), with Hexanon-lenses, left legendary Pancake 1,8

It is still a full-featured, fully mechanical SLR with a CdS TTL light meter and shutter-priority auto-exposure. The shutter speed range is 1s to 1/1000 and B, and the batteries (two PX625 mercury cells) are only needed for the light meter. The T4 is the only Autoreflex, that can be used with a Motor drive (2 frames per second, Winder AR).

=== Autoreflex TC and Acom-1 ===
The Autoreflex TC is a simpler version of the Autoreflex T4. The shutter speeds run from 1/8 to 1/1000 and B. In Japan it was sold as the Acom-1.

=== TC-X ===
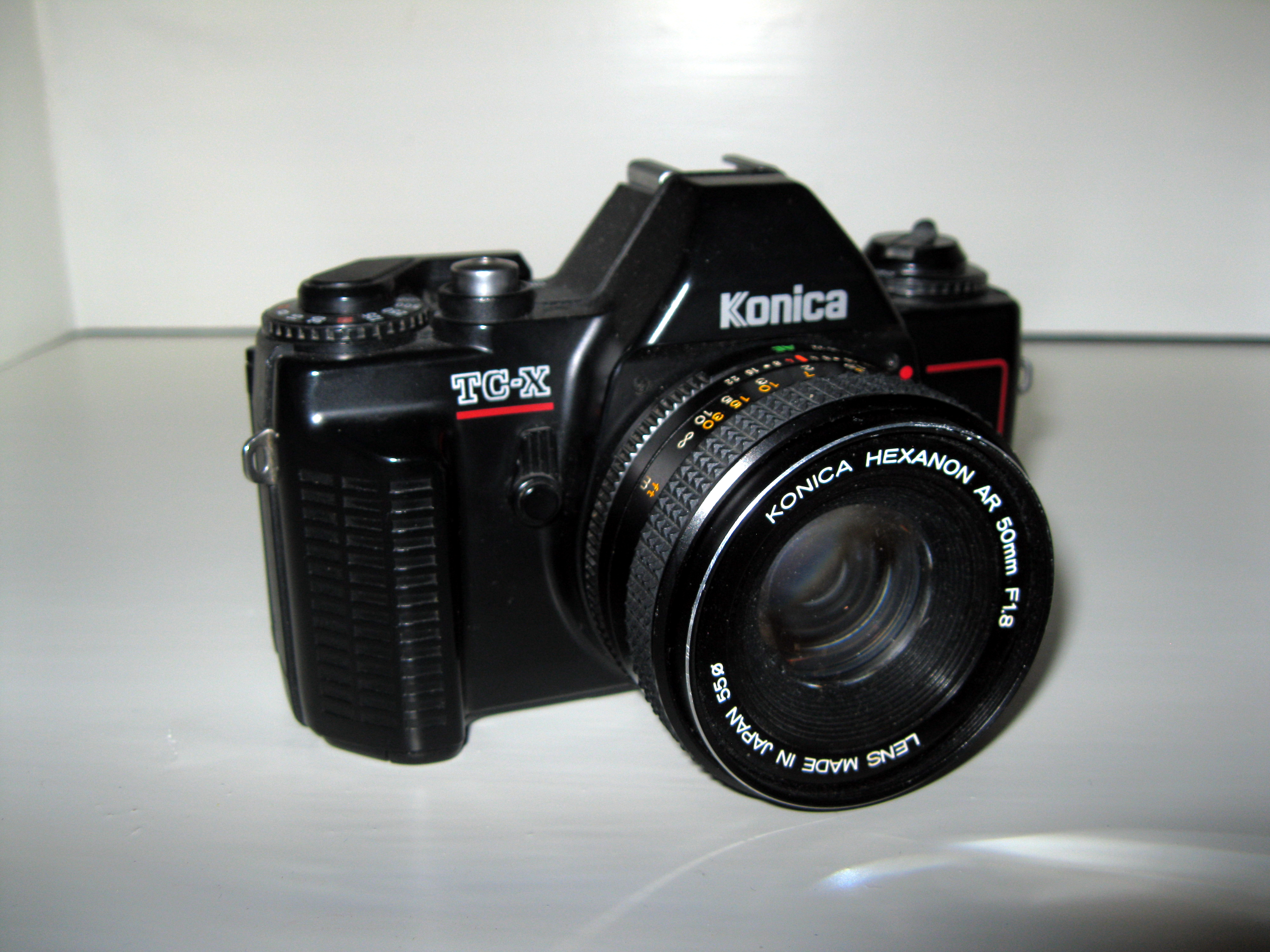
Konica TC-X

Built since 1985 by Cosina. It was not named Autoreflex, but has the TC in its name and its functionality remembers the Autoreflex TC; the innovation was the detection of film speed by the DX-system. The TC-X was small for a SLR (width x height x depth: 130 x 84 x 45 mm) and (for a SLR) very light (375 g), because a plastic-housing was used.

== See also ==
- Konica F-mount
