= Camera bag =

Bag made for storing cameras or camera parts

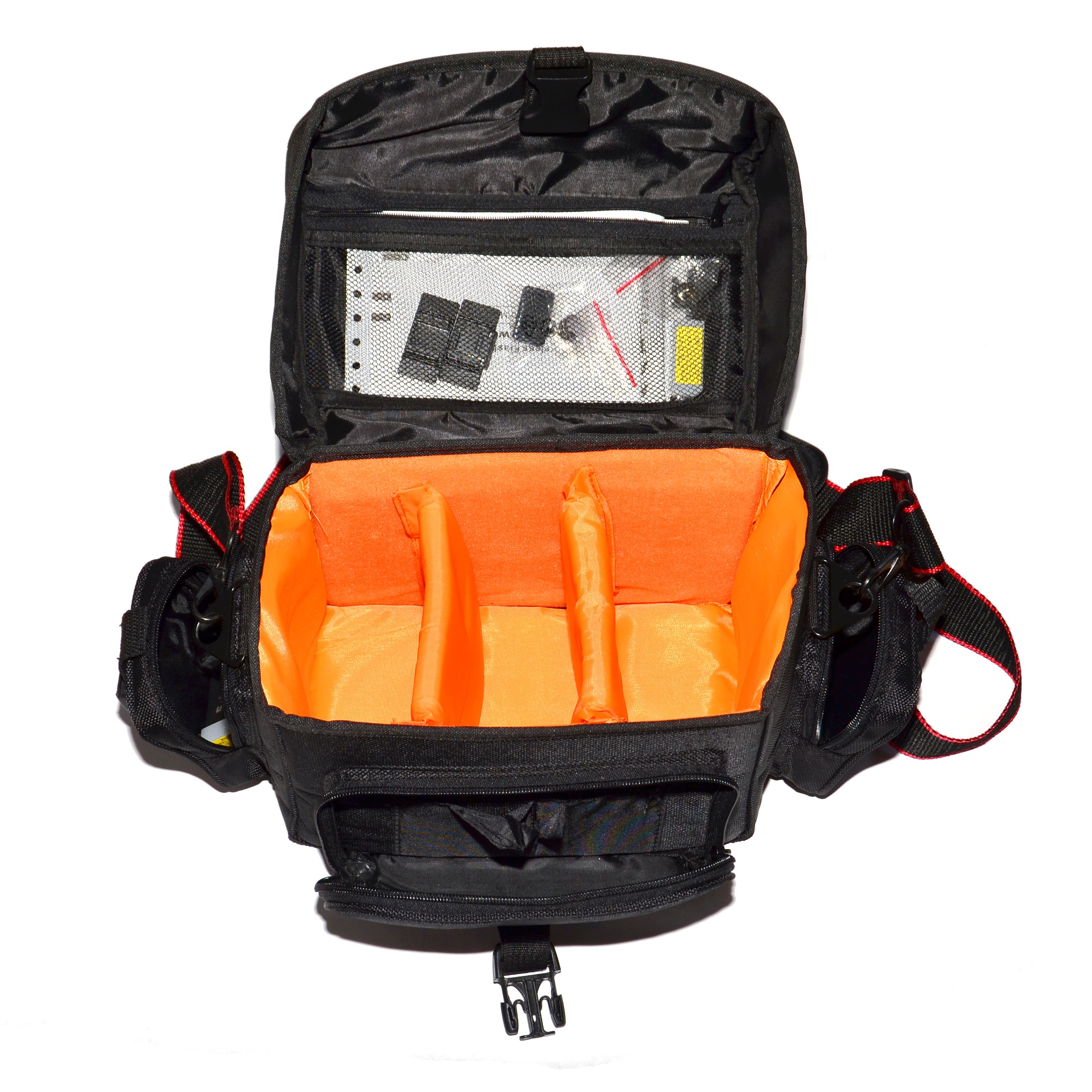
A camera bag

Camera bags are a 20th-century development for the convenient carrying and quick access to high-end camera equipment. They replaced fitted leather cases that were supplied with the earliest cameras.

In the 1970s, war and documentary photographers used fishing bags made by English companies Brady and Billingham. Billingham noticed their waterproof soft bags were popular with photographers and modified the fishing bag with padding to protect camera gear.

In 1975, photojournalist Jim Domke wanted a bag to carry all his camera gear and worked with a tent manufacturer to prototype a canvas camera bag. Feedback from photographers at the 1976 Republican National Convention changed the design to arrange the gear vertically, accessed from above. Domke sold his company in 1990 to Tiffen.
