= Vivitar =

American manufacturer, distributor, and marketer of photographic and optical equipment

- An updated Vivitar logo unveiled in 2016
- Founded: 1938; 88 years ago (as Ponder and Best by Max Ponder and John Best); Santa Monica, California, U.S.
- Founders: Max Ponder; John Best
- Products: Camera and photographic accessories
- Parent: Sakar International
- Website: vivitar.com

Vivitar Corporation is a manufacturer, distributor, and marketer of photographic and optical equipment originally based in Santa Monica, California. Since 2008, the Vivitar name serves as Sakar International's house brand for digital imaging, optics, mobile accessories, and audio products.

== Products ==
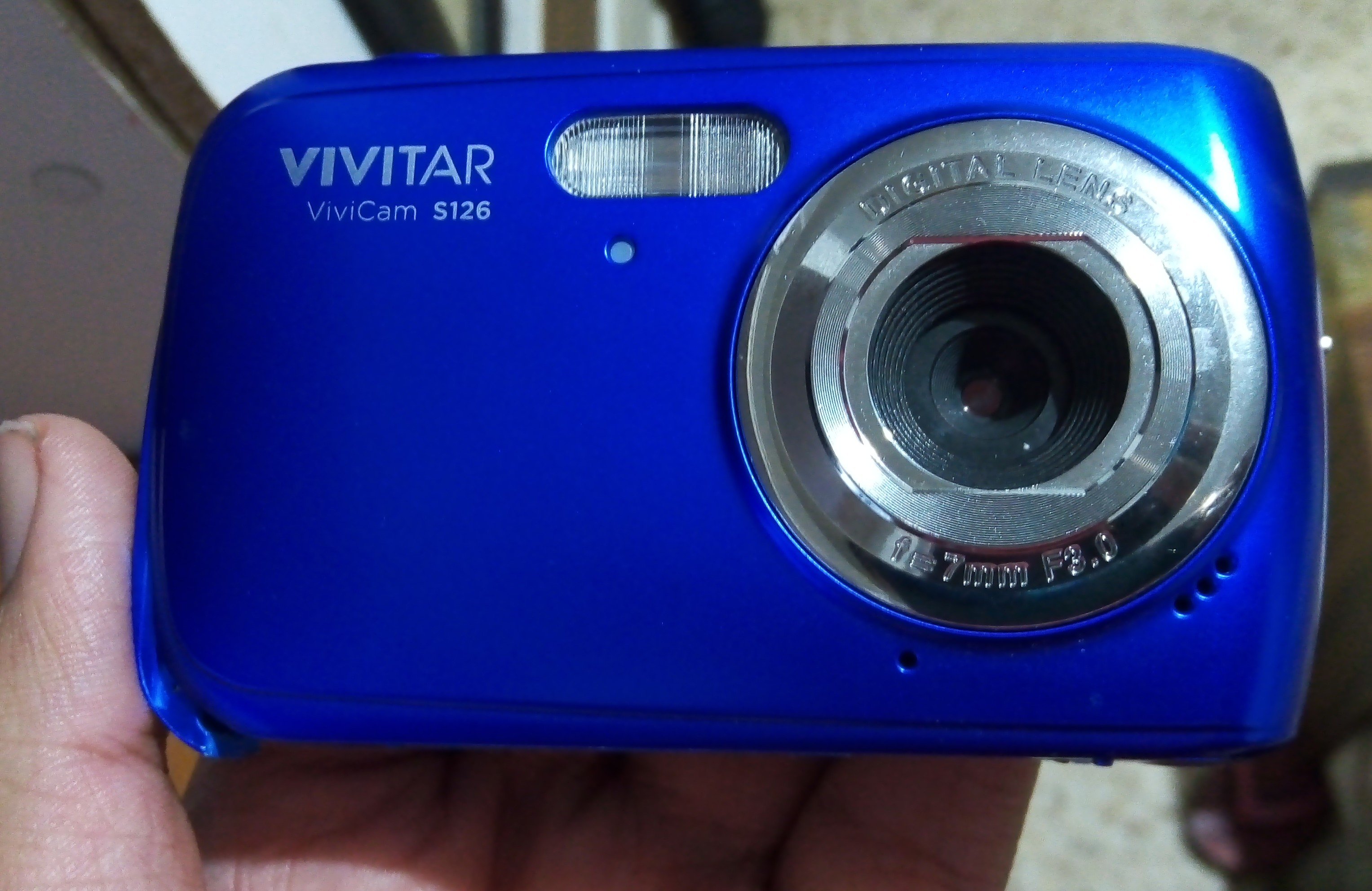
A Vivitar digital camera.

The company's product line has included 35 mm SLR cameras, zoom lenses, flashes, film enlargers, binoculars, digital cameras, night vision products, point-and-shoot cameras, tripods, underwater cameras, smart home technology, health and wellness accessories, and other audio/video equipment.

=== Point and shoot cameras ===
- ViviCam 55
- ViviCam 7122
- ViviCam 3735
- ViviCam 3350

=== Miscellaneous cameras ===
- Vivitar Kidscam

== History ==
Ponder & Best, Inc. was founded by Max Ponder and John Best in 1938 to distribute photographic products, and had its corporate headquarters in Los Angeles. Max Ponder headed the sales department, while John Best ran the operations side of the company. Ponder and Best first imported German-made photo equipment. After World War II, the partnership began to import cameras and photographic equipment from Japan. They were instrumental in the introduction of many brands into the American market, including Mamiya/Sekor 35mm cameras, OM-System 35mm equipment, Kobena 8mm movie cameras, Sankyo/Komura wide-angle/telephoto adapter lenses and a full line of photographic darkroom equipment imported from many manufacturers throughout Japan and later Taiwan. They were also the sole U.S. distributor for Olympus products at this time.

=== Lenses and flashes ===
Ponder and Best were the first to gain acceptance for lenses with interchangeable mounts, allowing customers to use the same lens on different manufacturers' camera bodies.

Original Vivitar logo, used until 2016

In the early 1960s, the partners created the "Vivitar" brand to compete with major lens manufacturers. The company commissioned experienced lens designers and reputable Japanese optical lens manufacturers such as Kino Precision to produce their lens designs. By carefully positioning their limited product line with key photo retailers, they quickly built a reputation for good-quality lenses at modest prices. The retailers found that they could make good margins while giving good value. As their reputation grew, many contract lens manufacturers sought them out to carry their products under the Vivitar brand. In the 1970s, Vivitar introduced the Series 1 lenses. These computer-designed lenses were priced relatively low and claimed to outperform the optics of camera manufacturers of the day.

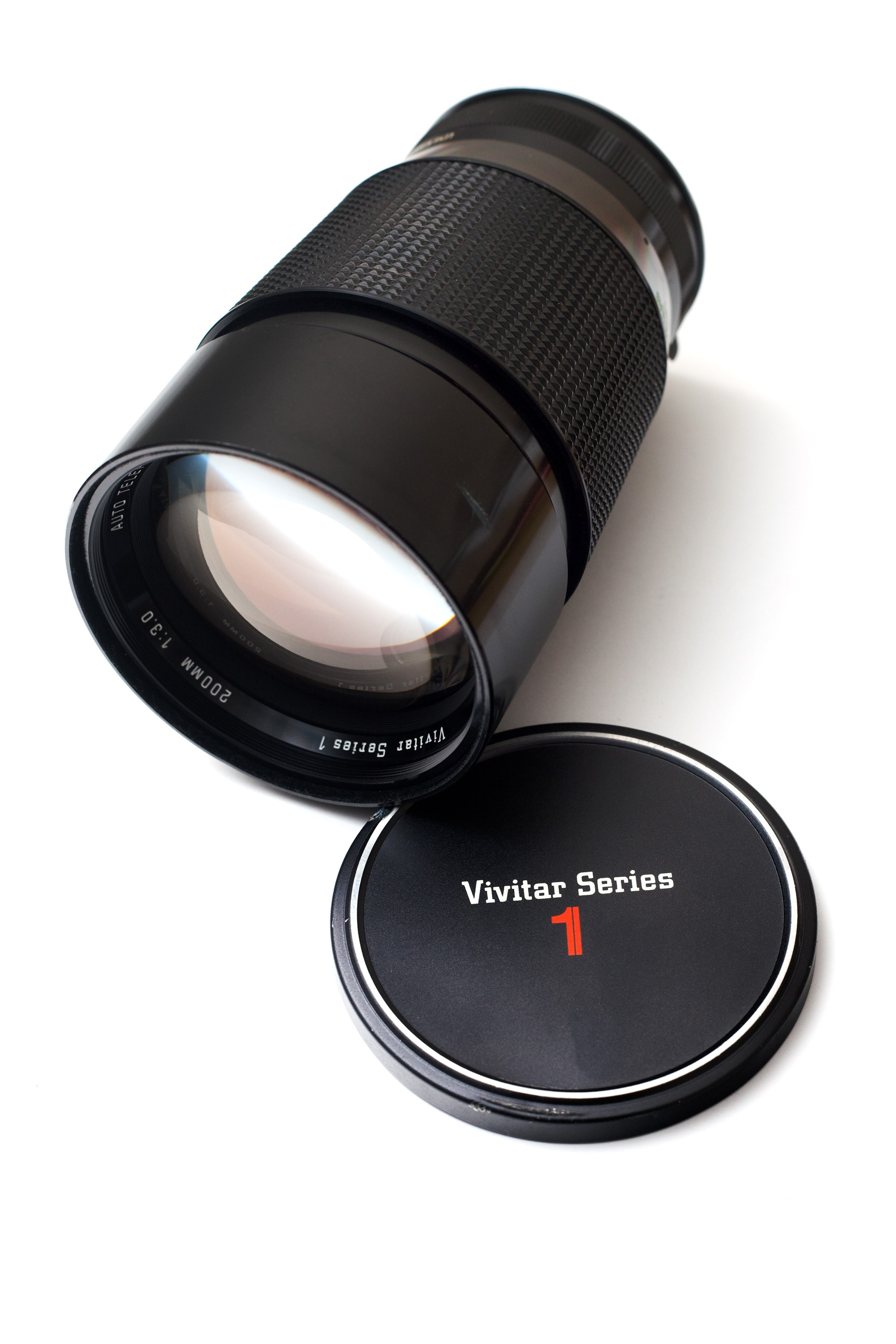
Vivitar Series 1 200 mm f/3, introduced in the mid-1970s

After the success of its aftermarket lens line, Vivitar later introduced its own line of 35mm film cameras manufactured by Japanese companies such as Cosina. These include the Cosina-made Vivitar SLR and the Vivitar 35ES/EE series of rangefinder cameras.

Vivitar also offered a new type of semi-professional flash unit from National/Panasonic called the Vivitar 260. It was replaced by the Vivitar 272 flash unit. The flashes were acclaimed by the photographic press (Modern Photography, Popular Photography, etc.) for their innovative design, but criticized for their use of expensive 9-volt batteries . Recognizing the problem, Max Ponder traveled to Japan to meet with the manufacturer, offering suggestions for improvements based on the feedback received from customers. The improved flash was introduced in 1970 as the Vivitar 273 then later on in 1976 as an improve 283, which became the most popular professional and enthusiast flash unit, outselling all its competitors combined and selling 3,000,000 units by 1978. In production for over 30 years, it was twice returned to production in response to customer demand after having been discontinued. There was also the model 285, which featured a zoom head to cover different focal length lenses and a built-in variable power setting. Earlier made-in-Japan Vivitar flashes have a trigger voltage of 250 V, which can damage the circuits of some digital cameras. Newer units made in China and Korea are low-voltage units producing 5 to 12 volts. The 283 and 285 have a removable sensor; an optional remote sensor cord makes off-camera automatic flash possible.

=== After Ponder and Best ===
After the deaths of Max Ponder and John Best, company ownership was transferred to a variety of owners. Some digital compact cameras were launched but were not successful. In November 2006, the corporation was purchased by the public company Syntax-Brillian Corporation for US$26 million in stock and was operated as a wholly owned subsidiary. On August 21, 2008, subsequent to its filing for bankruptcy, parent company Syntax-Brillian completed the sale of the Vivitar brand name and intellectual property to privately held consumer electronics maker Sakar International, based in Edison, New Jersey. Sakar did not purchase Vivitar's equipment, facilities or accounts receivable. Terms of the deal were not disclosed.

=== Current operations ===
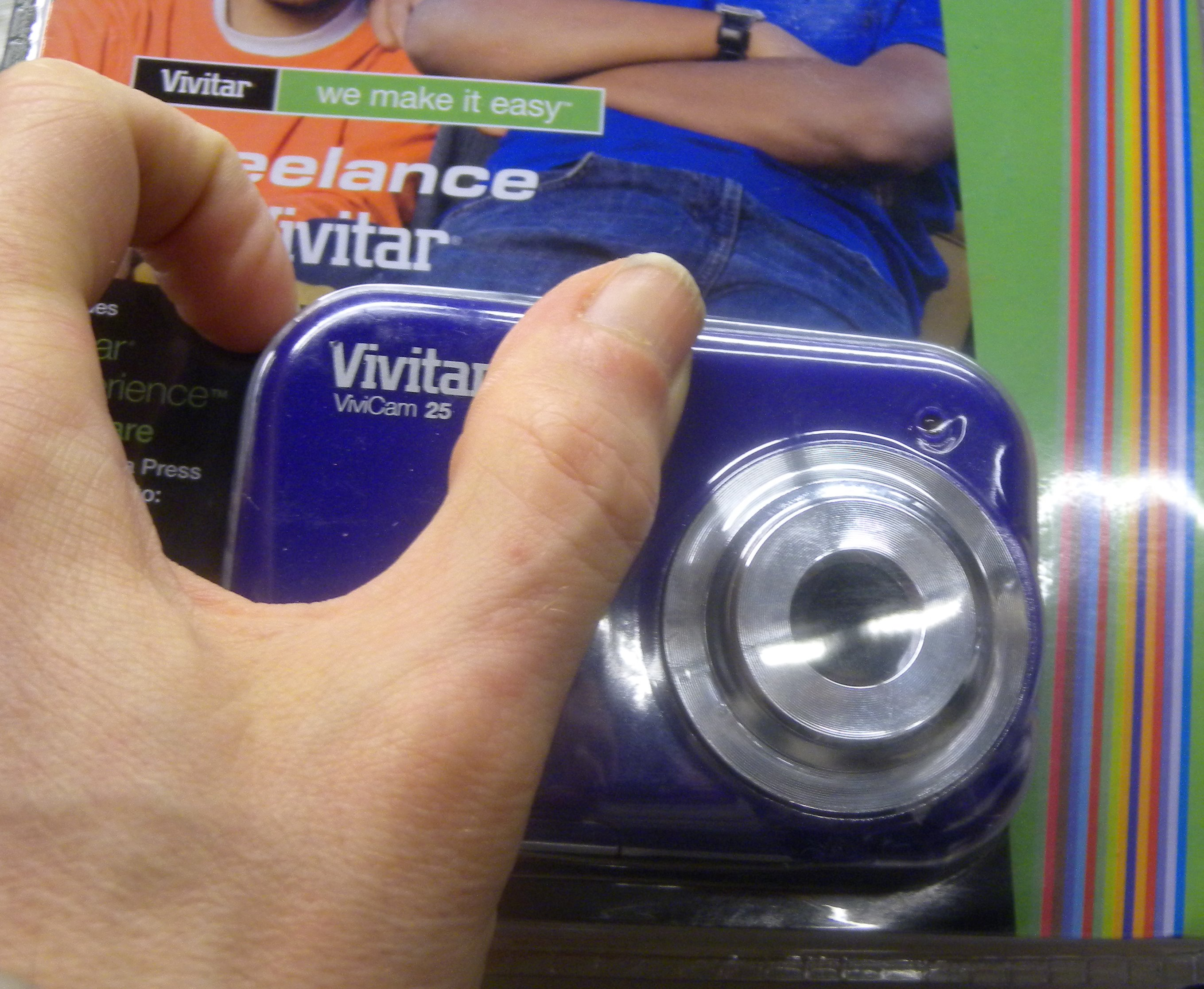
Low-end digital camera sold in 2011

In August 2008, Sakar announced plans to position Vivitar as a brand for its current mass retail digital cameras in the midprice range of $70–$300, along with certain camera accessories. New Vivitar-branded products such as digital photo frames are also planned, as well as potential licensing opportunities. In January 2009 Sakar introduced three new Vivitar-branded cameras and a digital SLR lens series. The products are Sakar's first Vivitar-branded items since acquiring the brand. In addition to other electronics products, in 2013 they announced and then shipped the $150 XO Tablet, a 7-inch Android tablet designed for children, with a bilingual English/Spanish interface.

== Vivitar lenses ==
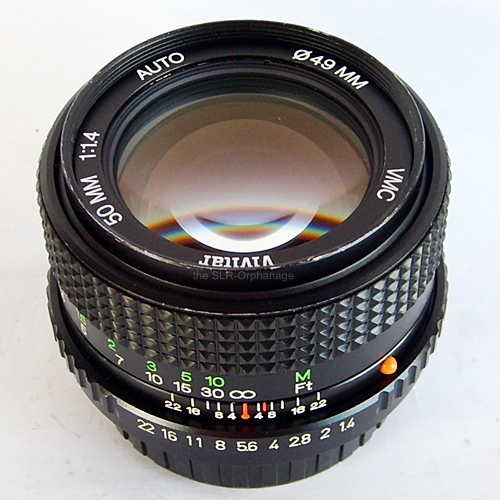
Vivitar 50mm ƒ/1.4 Auto VMC

=== Manual focus prime lenses ===
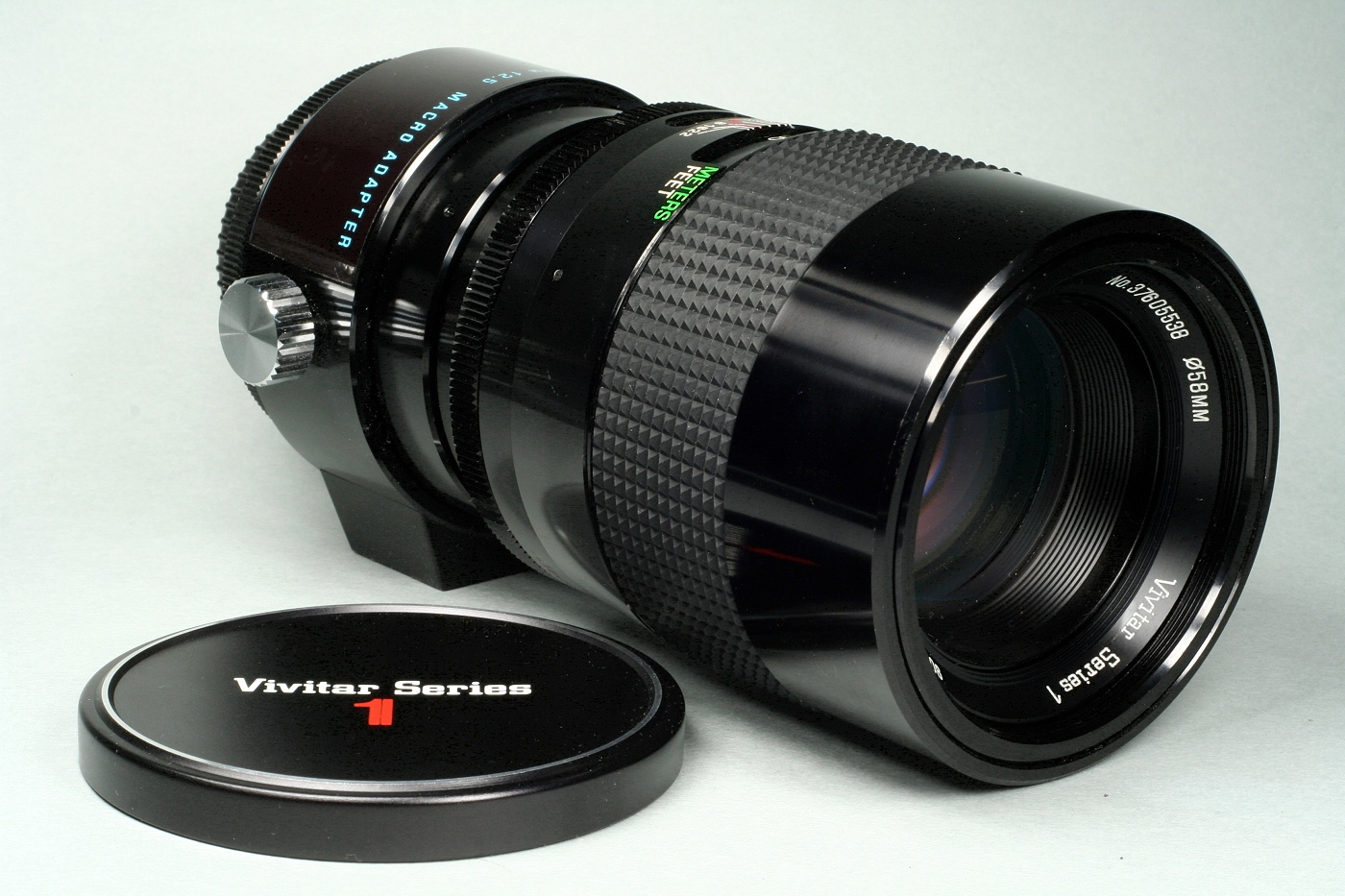
Vivitar Series 1 90mm ƒ/2.5 macro

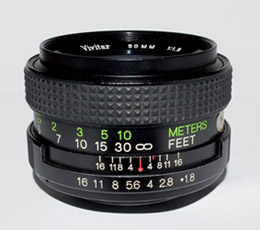
Vivitar 50mm ƒ/1.8

- Vivitar Series 1 7mm ƒ/3.5 Fish-eye CS (for APS-C digital sensors only, a rebadged Samyang 8mm ƒ/3.5 from 2009)
- Vivitar Series 1 13mm ƒ/2.8 (rebadged Samyang 14mm ƒ/2.8, released in 2010)
- Vivitar 17mm ƒ/3.5 (made by Tokina)
- Vivitar 19mm ƒ/3.8 (made by Cosina)
- Vivitar 20mm ƒ/3.8 (82mm filter, made by Kiron)
- Vivitar 21mm ƒ/3.8 T4 (made by Tokina)
- Vivitar 24mm ƒ/2 (52mm filter version made by Komine, 55mm made by Kiron)
- Vivitar 24mm ƒ/2.8 (Cosina)
- Vivitar 24mm ƒ/2.8 T4 (67mm filter, made by Tokina)
- Vivitar 24mm ƒ/2.8 TX (58mm filter, made by Tokina)
- Vivitar Series 1 28mm ƒ/1.9 (made by Tokina)
- Vivitar 28mm ƒ/2 "Close Focus"(49mm filter version made by Komine)
- Vivitar 28mm ƒ/2 (55mm by Kiron)
- Vivitar 28mm ƒ/2.5 (62mm or 67mm filter, made by Kiron)
- Vivitar 28mm ƒ/2.5 TX (58mm filter, made by Tokina)
- Vivitar 28mm ƒ/2.8 T4 (58mm filter, made by Tokina)
- Vivitar Close Focus 28mm ƒ/2.8
- Vivitar 28mm ƒ/2.8 (made by Komine)
- Vivitar 28mm ƒ/2.8 TX (made by Tokina)
- Vivitar 35mm ƒ/1.4 (made by Samyang, released in 2011)
- Vivitar 35mm ƒ/1.9 (made by Komine)
- Vivitar 35mm ƒ/2.5 TX (made by Tokina)
- Vivitar 35mm ƒ/2.8
- Vivitar 35mm ƒ/2.8 T4 (made by Tokina)
- Vivitar 50mm ƒ/1.4 VMC (49mm filter made by Cosina)
- Vivitar 50mm ƒ/1.7 (Cosina)
- Vivitar 50mm ƒ/1.8 (Cosina)
- Vivitar 50mm ƒ/1.9 (Cosina)
- Vivitar 50mm ƒ/2.0 (49mm filter)
- Vivitar 55mm ƒ/1.2 VMC (Cosina)
- Vivitar 55mm ƒ/2.8 Macro (made by Komine)
- Vivitar Series 1 85mm ƒ/1.4 Aspherical IF (made by Samyang, released in 2009)
- Vivitar 85mm ƒ/1.8 T-mount
- Vivitar 90mm ƒ/2.5 Macro (1:1 macro, made by Komine)
- Vivitar 90mm ƒ/2.8 Macro (1:1 macro, made by Komine)
- Vivitar Series 1 90mm ƒ/2.5 1:2 Macro, 1:1 achieved with dedicated extender, nicknamed the Bokina (made by Tokina)
- Vivitar 100mm ƒ/2.8 Macro (made by Kiron)
- Vivitar Series 1 105mm ƒ/2.5 macro (1:1 macro, made by Kiron)
- Vivitar 105mm ƒ/2.8 T4 (made by Tokina)
- Vivitar 135mm ƒ/1.5 professional T-mount
- Vivitar Series 1 135mm ƒ/2.3 (made by Komine)
- Vivitar 135mm ƒ/2.5 TX (made by Tokina)
- Vivitar 135mm ƒ/2.8 (made by Komine)
- Vivitar 135mm ƒ/2.8 close-focusing 1:2 Macro (made by Komine)
- Vivitar 135mm ƒ/2.8 T4 & TX (made by Tokina)
- Vivitar 135mm ƒ/3.5 T4 (made by Tokina)
- Vivitar 135mm ƒ/3.5 T-mount
- Vivitar 200mm ƒ/3.5 (early models made by Kiron, later models made by Komine)
- Vivitar 200mm ƒ/3.5 T4 & TX (made by Tokina)
- Vivitar Series 1 200mm ƒ/3 (made by Komine)
- Vivitar Series 1 200mm ƒ/3.5 Auto Focus (made by Cosina)
- Vivitar 250mm ƒ/4.5 T4 (made by Tokina)
- Vivitar 300mm ƒ/5.5 T4 (made by Tokina)
- Vivitar 300mm ƒ/5.6 (made by Olympus)
- Vivitar 300mm ƒ/5.6 (made by Komine)
- Vivitar 400mm ƒ/5.6
- Vivitar 400mm ƒ/5.6 IF TX (made by Tokina)
- Vivitar 400mm ƒ/6.3 T4 (made by Tokina)
- Vivitar Series 1 450mm ƒ/4.5 aspherical mirror T-mount
- Vivitar 500mm ƒ/8
- Vivitar Series 1 500mm ƒ/8 mirror T-mount (released in 2009, made by Samyang)
- Vivitar 500mm ƒ/6.3 T-mount (non-mirror)
- Vivitar 600mm ƒ/8 T-mount (non-mirror)
- Vivitar Series 1 600mm ƒ/8 solid cat T-mount (made by Perkin-Elmer)
- Vivitar Series 1 800mm ƒ/8 mirror T-mount (released in 2009, made by Samyang)
- Vivitar Series 1 800mm ƒ/11 solid cat T-mount (made by Perkin-Elmer)

=== Manual focus zoom lenses ===
Vivitar manual focus zoom lenses
Ultrawide	Wide	Normal	Telephoto	Ultratelephoto	Series	Maker	Notes	Image
17-28mm f/4-4.5						Samyang		
19-35mm f/3.5-4.5						Cosina		
	24-48mm f/3.8				Series 1	Kiron		
	24-70mm f/3.8-4.8				Series 1	Cosina		
	28-80mm f/3.5-4.5				RL edition	Kobori	Macro focusing zoom MC, 62mm filter size	
	28-105mm f/2.8-3.8				Series 1	Cosina		
	28-200mm f/3.5-5.3					Kobori		
	28-210mm f/3.5-5.6					Cosina		
	28-50mm f/3.8-4.8				RL edition	Komine		
	28-70mm f/3.5-4.8					Cosina		
	28-85mm f/2.8-3.8					Kiron	Vari-focal zoom	
	28-85mm f/3.5-4.5					Kobori		
	28-90mm f/2.8-3.5				Series 1	Komine		
	35-70mm f/2.8-3.8					Komine		
	35-70mm f/3.5					Komine		
	35-85mm f/2.8				Series 1	Kiron	Vari-focal zoom	
	35-105mm f/3.5					Tokina	Close focus, fixed-mount and TX versions available	
	35-200mm f/3-4.5					Kobori	Macro	
		55-135mm f/3.5				Tokina	T4 mount	
			70-150mm f/3.8			Kiron	1 and 2-touch zoom	
			70-150mm f/3.8			Tokina	TX mount	
			70-210mm f/2.8-4		Series 1	Komine	Early versions	
			70-210mm f/2.8-4		Series 1	Cosina	Later versions. Lens review	
			70-210mm f/3.5		Series 1	Kiron	67mm versions	
			70-210mm f/3.5		Series 1	Tokina	62mm versions. Lens review	
			70-210mm f/4.5			Kobori	Macro	
			70-210mm f/4-5.6			Cosina		
			75-205mm f/3.8			Kiron	1- and 2-touch	
			75-205mm f/3.5-4.5			Tokina	Macro focusing	
			75-260mm f/4.5			Tokina	T4 & TX mounts	
			75-300mm f/4.5-5.6			Kobori		
			80-200mm f/4			Tokina	TX	
			80-200mm f/4.5			Kiron, Komine, and Kobori	Different models. Manufacturer distinguished by serial number.	
			85-205mm f/3.8			Kiron	Preset T-mount and automatic diaphragm fixed-mount versions	
			90-230mm f/4.5			Tokina	T4 and close-focus TX versions	
			90-180mm f/4.5		Series 1	Kiron	Flat Field	
			100-200mm f/4			Komine		
			100-300mm f/5			Tokina	TX mount	
			100-500mm f/5.6-8			Cosina		
			120-600mm f/8			Kobori	Lens review	
				650-1300mm f/8-16		Samyang	T-mount	

=== Auto focus lenses ===
- Vivitar Series 1 19-35mm ƒ/3.5-4.5 (made by Cosina)
- Vivitar Series 1 28-70mm ƒ/2.8 (Sigma)
- Vivitar Series 1 28-70mm ƒ/3.5-4.8 SC (self-contained; requires three AAA batteries to operate)
- Vivitar Series 1 28-105mm ƒ/2.8-3.8 MC (Cosina)
- Vivitar 28-80mm f3.5-5.6
- Vivitar 28-105mm ƒ/2.8-4.0
- Vivitar Series 1 28-210mm ƒ/4.2-6.5
- Vivitar 28-300mm ƒ/4-6.3 (Cosina)
- Vivitar 35-70mm f3.5-4.5
- Vivitar Series 1 75-200mm ƒ/4.5 SC (self-contained; requires three AAA batteries to operate)
- Vivitar Series 1 70-210mm ƒ/2.8 (Sigma)
- Vivitar Series 1 70-210mm ƒ/2.8-4.0
- Vivitar Series 1 70-210mm ƒ/2.8-4.0 APO
- Vivitar 70-210mm ƒ/4.5-5.6 (Cosina)
- Vivitar Series 1 70-300 ƒ/4.5-5.6
- Vivitar 100mm ƒ/3.5 Macro (made by Cosina)
- Vivitar 100-300mm ƒ/5.6-6.7 (Cosina)
- Vivitar 100-400mm ƒ/4.5-6.7 (Cosina)
- Vivitar 200mm ƒ/3.5 (self-contained; requires three AAA batteries to operate) (Komine and Cosina)

=== Teleconverters ===
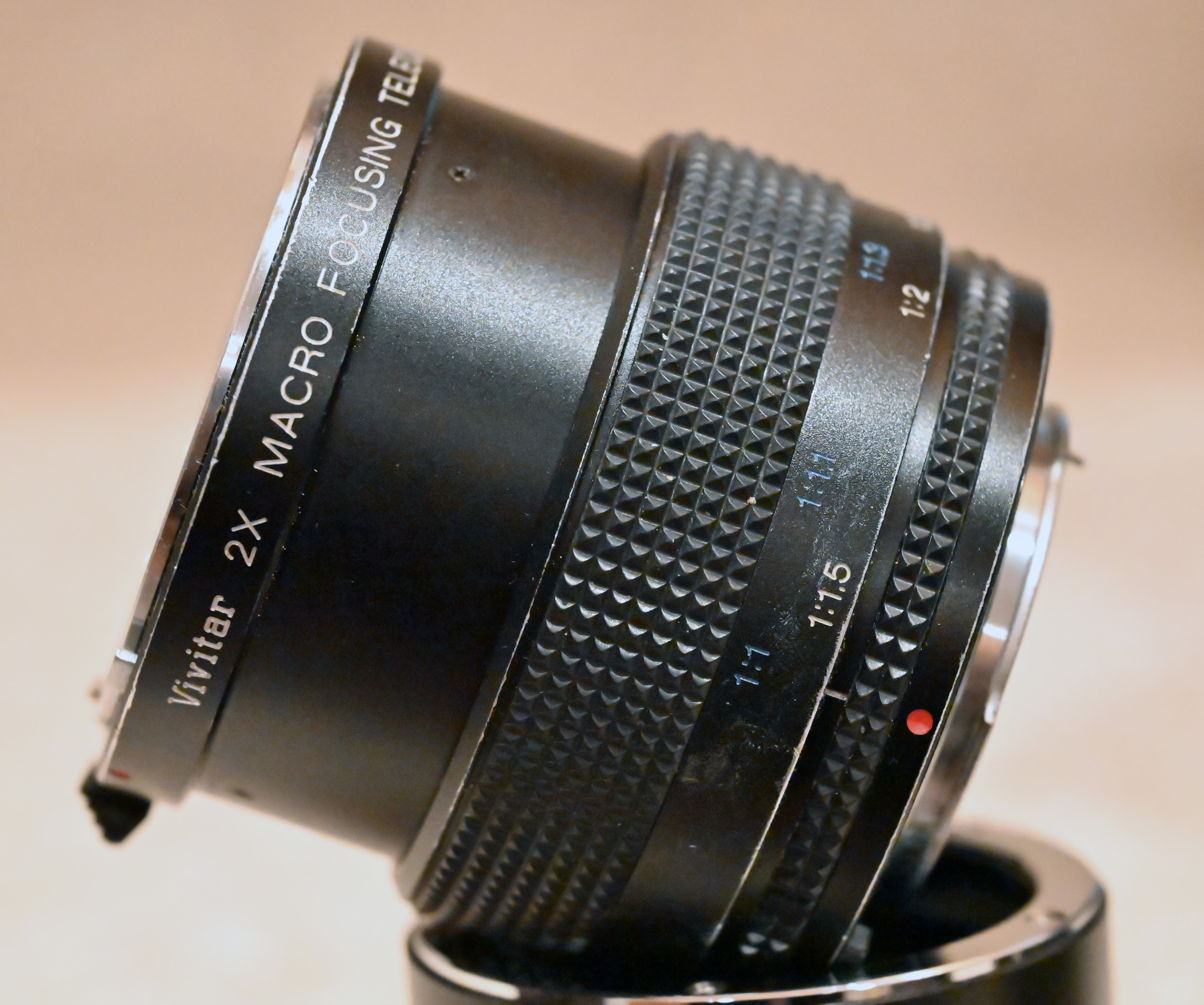
2x macro teleconverter for Nikon F-mount

- 1.5× teleconverter
- 2× macro-focusing teleconverter. This featured a ring which, when turned, changes the close-focusing distance, and will give a 1:1 magnification when used with a 50mm lens (similar to an extension tube, but variable and having lenses).
- 3× teleconverter

== See also ==
- List of digital camera brands
- List of photographic equipment makers
