= Syntaxis =

Syntaxis may refer to:

- Syntaxis Mathematica, an alternative name of Ptolemy's Almagest
- Syntaxis, a synonym of the moth genus Leucoperina
- Syntaxis, the tribute paid by the Athens’s allies into the Delian League treasury, it was originally called phoros (φόρος)
- Syntaxis (geology), an abrupt major change in the orientation of an orogenic belt

== See also ==
- Sintaksis, a Russian émigré journal edited by Maria Rozanova
- Sintaksis (Moscow), a samizdat poetry periodical edited by Alexander Ginzburg
- Syntax (disambiguation)
