= Parfocal lens =

Lens that stays in focus when zooming

A parfocal lens is a lens that stays in focus when magnification/focal length is changed. There is inevitably some amount of focus error, but it is too small to be considered significant.

== Microscopy ==
Parfocal microscope objectives stay in focus when magnification is changed; i.e., if the microscope is switched from a lower power objective (e.g., 10×) to a higher power objective (e.g., 40×), the object stays in focus. Most modern bright-field microscopes are parfocal.

== Photography ==
Zoom lenses (sometimes referred to as "true" zoom) are ideally parfocal, in that focus is maintained as the lens is zoomed (i.e., focal length and magnification changed), which is convenient and has the advantage of allowing more accurate focusing at maximal focal length then zooming back to a shorter focal length to compose the image.

Many zoom lenses, particularly in the case of fixed-lens cameras, are actually varifocal lenses, which gives lens designers more flexibility in optical design trade-offs (e.g., focal length range, maximal aperture, size, weight, cost) than parfocal zoom, which is practical because of auto-focus, and because the camera processor can automatically adjust the lens to keep it in focus while changing focal length ("zooming"), making operation practically indistinguishable from a parfocal zoom.

== Cinematography ==
Zoom lenses used for moviemaking applications must be parfocal to be of practical use. It is almost impossible to stay in correct focus (as done manually by the focus puller) while zooming. This could be possible theoretically, but if the subject and/or camera also move, there are too many variables to correct consistently.

== Telescopy ==
Parfocal telescope eyepieces stay in focus when magnification is changed; i.e., if the telescope is switched from a lower-power eyepiece (e.g., 10×) to a higher-power eyepiece (e.g., 20×), or vice versa, the object stays in focus.
