= Syntax–Brillian Corporation =

Defunct American company

Syntax-Brillian Corporation
- Industry: Consumer electronics
- Founded: April 2004; 22 years ago
- Defunct: August 2009; 17 years ago
- Fate: Chapter 11 bankruptcy, sold to Emerson Radio
- Headquarters: Tempe, Arizona, U.S.
- Products: LCD Televisions

Syntax-Brillian Corporation was an American company based in Tempe, Arizona. It was formed on November 30, 2005, by the merger of Syntax (seller of widescreen HDTV-ready LCD televisions) with Brillian Corporation (seller of Brillian brand televisions). The company sold HDTVs under the brand name of Ölevia and its stock was previously listed on the Nasdaq Stock Market under the ticker symbol BRLC. In 2009, it resolved a bankruptcy proceeding by selling all its assets to Emerson Radio Corp.

== History ==
=== Olevia TV plant in California ===
In October 2006, the company opened a 50,000-square-foot plant in Ontario, California (in partnership with Solar Link Technologies) to assemble its Olevia-branded LCD and LCoS TVs. This facility created 120 jobs on one shift, aiming to compete with major brands by assembling units locally and label them as "Made in USA".

=== Bankruptcy and delisting ===
On July 8, 2008, Syntax-Brillian filed for protection under Chapter 11 of the U.S. Bankruptcy Code., On July 21, 2008 the company reported that its stock was to be delisted from the Nasdaq Stock Market due to listing violations and its filing for protection under Chapter 11. Syntax-Brillian sees no value for its common stock after Chapter 11.

The company entered into an asset purchase agreement to sell all of its assets besides those of its Vivitar unit to newly created Olevia International Group, LLC, which is owned by TCV Group, provider of plastic injection molded parts for the Olevia branded widescreen HDTVs. In exchange for the purchased assets, Olevia International Group agreed to assume $60.0 million of Syntax-Brillian's secured debt. The proposed sale was anticipated to close by August 31, 2008. However, the transaction with TCV Group never closed. Instead, in May 2009, Emerson Radio Corp. purchased the assets of Syntax-Brillian including the Olevia brand name.

=== Investigations, allegations of fraud, lawsuits ===
The bankruptcy court appointed an examiner, James Feltman, who concluded in the fall of 2008 that "Syntax-Brillian was improperly managed to benefit Kolin, not shareholders." A federal bankruptcy fraud task force consisting of the Justice Department, the Internal Revenue Service, and the Postal Inspection Service began probing Syntax-Brillian for alleged fraud in early 2009. Concurrently, Olevia International Group, LLC allegedly defaulted on the agreement to purchase the assets of Syntax-Brillian. Four separate lawsuits were filed in the United States, "alleging that former executives of the company made false financial statements and that they knowingly participated in the fraudulent transfer of money to Taiwan Kolin Co., their Asian parts supplier." One shareholder who participated as a pro se litigant in the bankruptcy proceedings wrote a book about the scandal entitled The Sheep and The Guardians: Diary of a SEC Sanctioned Swindle.

=== Federal fraud charges, and judgements against officers of the company ===
In 2011, federal fraud charges were brought against five former executives: Wayne Pratt, former chief financial officer; James Li, former company president; Roger Kao, former vice chairman of manufacturer Taiwan Kolin Co, a supplier of Syntax-Brillian; Christopher Liu, former chairman of Kolin. Additional charges were also brought against Thomas Chow, chief procurement officer of Syntax. In 2012, Thomas Chow was ordered to pay over 48 million dollars in penalties after he failed to respond to an SEC lawsuit. The Securities and Exchange Commission obtained permanent injunctions against defendants James Li, Roger Kao, Christopher Liu, and Wayne Pratt, and collected disgorgement and civil penalties from these defendants. In addition, the Commission obtained officer and director bars against Li, Liu, and Pratt, as well as the entry of an administrative order suspending Pratt from appearing or practicing before the Commission as an accountant with the right to reapply after five years. The SEC filed charges against Robert Chiu, an audit and relationship partner for Syntax's outside auditor, for aiding and abetting the fraudulent revenue recognition scheme. In April 2012, former CEO James Li was ordered to pay $11 million in "insider trading" and "civil" penalties "for his role in the financial fraud scheme". In addition the court "also imposed an officer and director bar against Li".

The outside counsel of Syntax-Brillian corporation, the law firm of Greenberg Traurig LLP—most famous for being associated with Jack Abramoff—settled out of court with the Syntax-Brillian creditors' trust, agreeing to repay $3.3 million earned in pre-bankruptcy fees, of the $5 million paid to the law firm by Syntax-Brillian in the year prior to the bankruptcy.

== Vivitar ==
On November 21, 2006 the company acquired for $26 million in stock privately held Vivitar Corporation, a seller of digital cameras and camcorders, which it operated as a wholly owned subsidiary. Subsequent to its bankruptcy filing, the company sold the Vivitar brand name and intellectual property to privately held Sakar International, Inc. The sale did not include Vivitar's equipment, facilities or accounts receivable and terms were not disclosed. The deal to acquire Vivitar was subsequently named "Turnaround Atlas Awards' Special Situations M&A Deal of the Year".
