= Billingham Bags =

Billingham

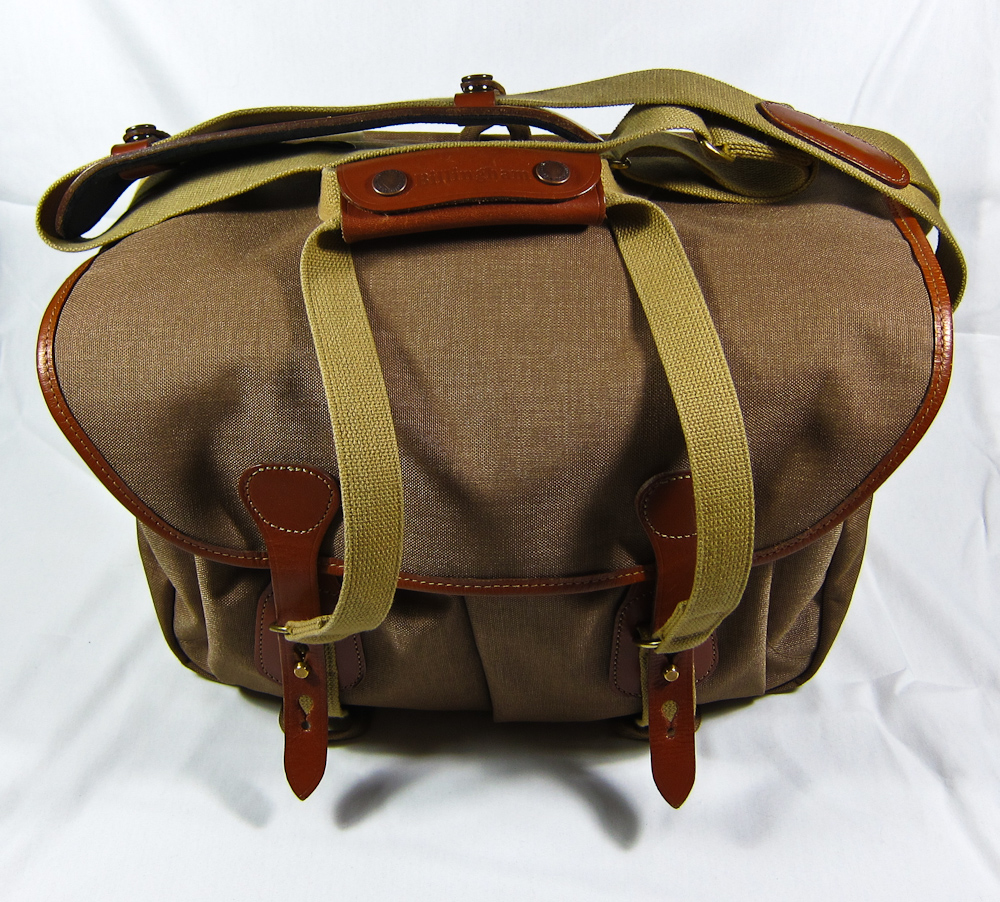
- Billingham 335 camera bag
- Type: Limited
- Founded: 1973
- Founder: Martin Billingham
- Headquarters: Cradley Heath, England
- Products: Shoulder bags, rucksacks, protective cases and equipment for cameras, lenses, laptops, tablets and photography accessories.
- Website: billingham.co.uk

Billingham Bags (M Billingham & Co Ltd) is a British brand of professional bags and vests for carrying cameras, lenses, laptops and photography accessories. The company's headquarters are in Cradley Heath, England.

== History ==
Billingham Bags (M Billingham & Co Ltd) was founded in 1973 by Martin Billingham, and is still owned and run by the Billingham family. Originally a manufacturer of fishing bags, in 1978 Billingham discovered that a large number of their bags were being sold to a photographer in New York City. Within a year production had switched almost entirely to specialist camera bags. Billingham Bags have worldwide distribution and are still hand made in Cradley Heath, England. Billingham bags are notable for their process of bonding the fabric of the bag to butyl rubber for water resistance. Billingham have had partnerships with well known camera manufacturers Leica and Hasselblad, making custom camera bags for both companies. They have also had a number of collaborations with British fashion and design house Pedlars.

== Products ==
While Billingham produce rucksacks, vests and laptop/tablet accessories, they are most widely known for their range of shoulder bags which they have been producing for photographers since 1978. The bags are well regarded by professional photographers, photojournalists and travel writers due to their traditional construction of canvas and leather, although some also use synthetic materials. Users of Billingham bags include television presenters Richard Hammond, who described his as 'a sort of comfort blanket', and Matt James.
