= Varifocal lens =

Type of camera lens

A varifocal lens is a camera lens with variable focal length in which focus changes as focal length (and magnification) changes, as compared to a parfocal ("true") zoom lens, which remains in focus as the lens zooms (focal length and magnification change). Many so-called "zoom" lenses, particularly in the case of fixed-lens cameras, are actually varifocal lenses, which give lens designers more flexibility in optical design trade-offs (focal length range, maximum aperture, size, weight, cost) than parfocal zoom. These are practical because of autofocus, and because the camera processor can automatically adjust the lens to keep it in focus while changing focal length ("zooming") making it suitable for still photography where a change in magnification of the subject, as demonstrated below is not a problem. The change in the subject size is a significant problem in video and true parfocal designs are needed for higher quality video work. Varifocal lenses can be used for image display as well as capture, and Meta's Reality Labs has confirmed developing a varifocal display for virtual reality.

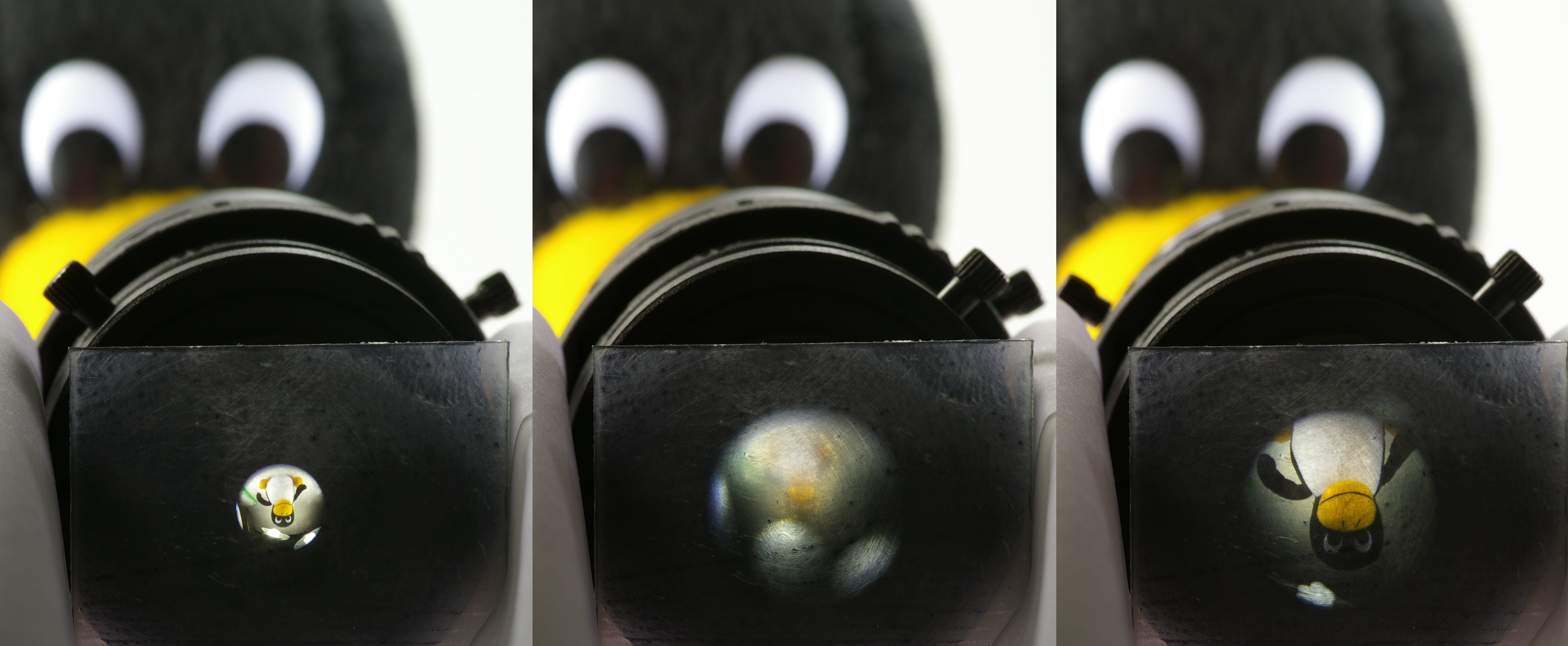
A varifocal lens. Left image is at ƒ=2.8 mm, in focus. Middle image is at ƒ=12 mm with the focus left alone from 2.8 mm. Right image is at ƒ=12 mm and refocused. The close knob is focal length and the far knob is focus.
