= Konica FC-1 =

SLR camera

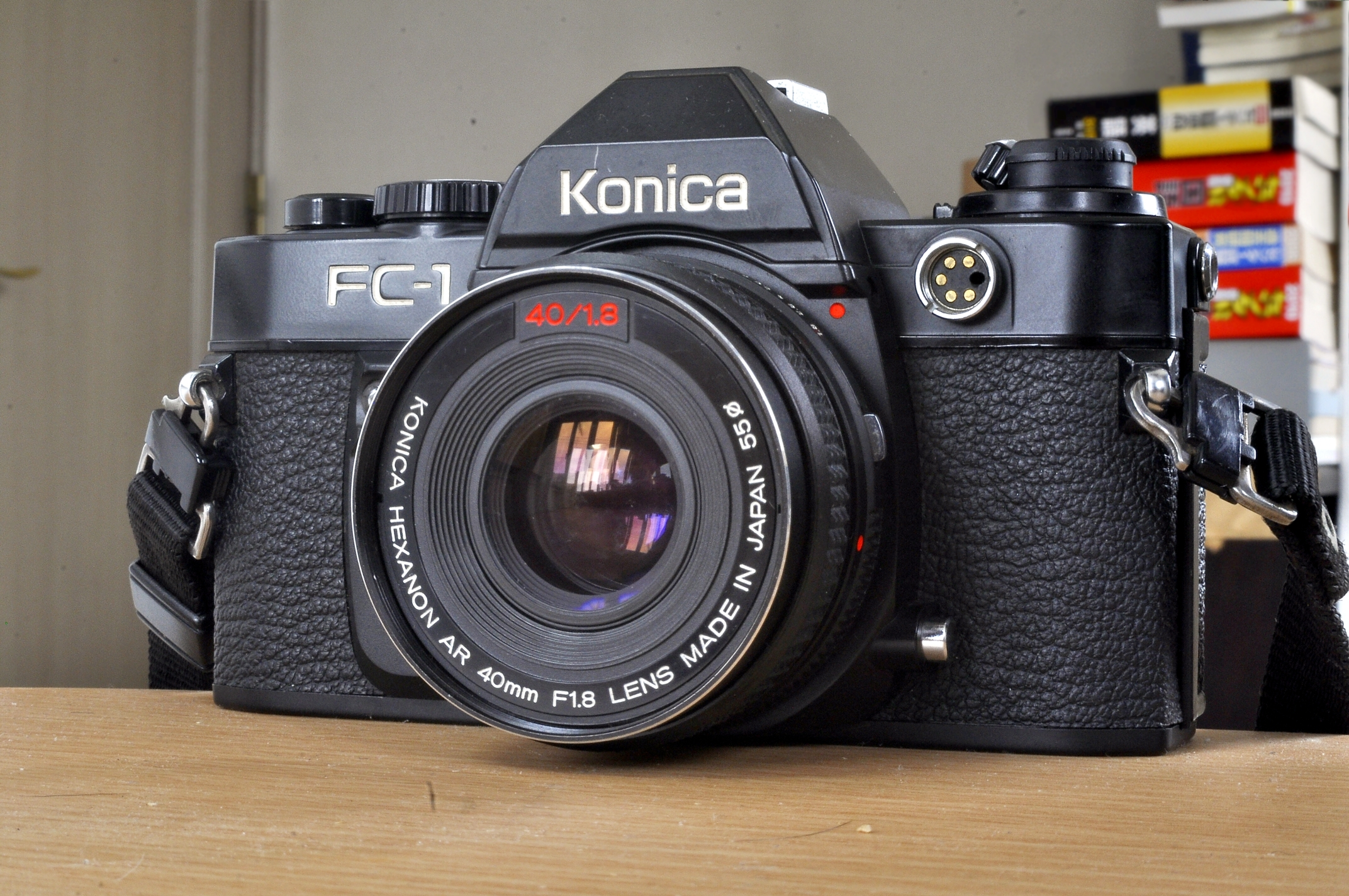

Overview
- Maker: Konishiroku
- Type: 35 mm SLR

Lens
- Lens mount: Konica AR

Sensor/medium
- Film speed: ISO 25 to 1600 [manual]

Focusing
- Focus: Manual

Exposure/metering
- Exposure: Shutter priority, manual
- Exposure metering: EV0 to EV19 @ ASA 100

Flash
- Flash: Hot shoe, PC socket
- Flash synchronization: 1/100 s

Shutter
- Frame rate: Manual lever winding, unmodified.
- Shutter speed range: 2 s to 1/1000 s

General
- Battery: 4SR44 6 V battery
- Dimensions: 89 × 140 × 45 mm
- Weight: 515 g
- Made in: Japan

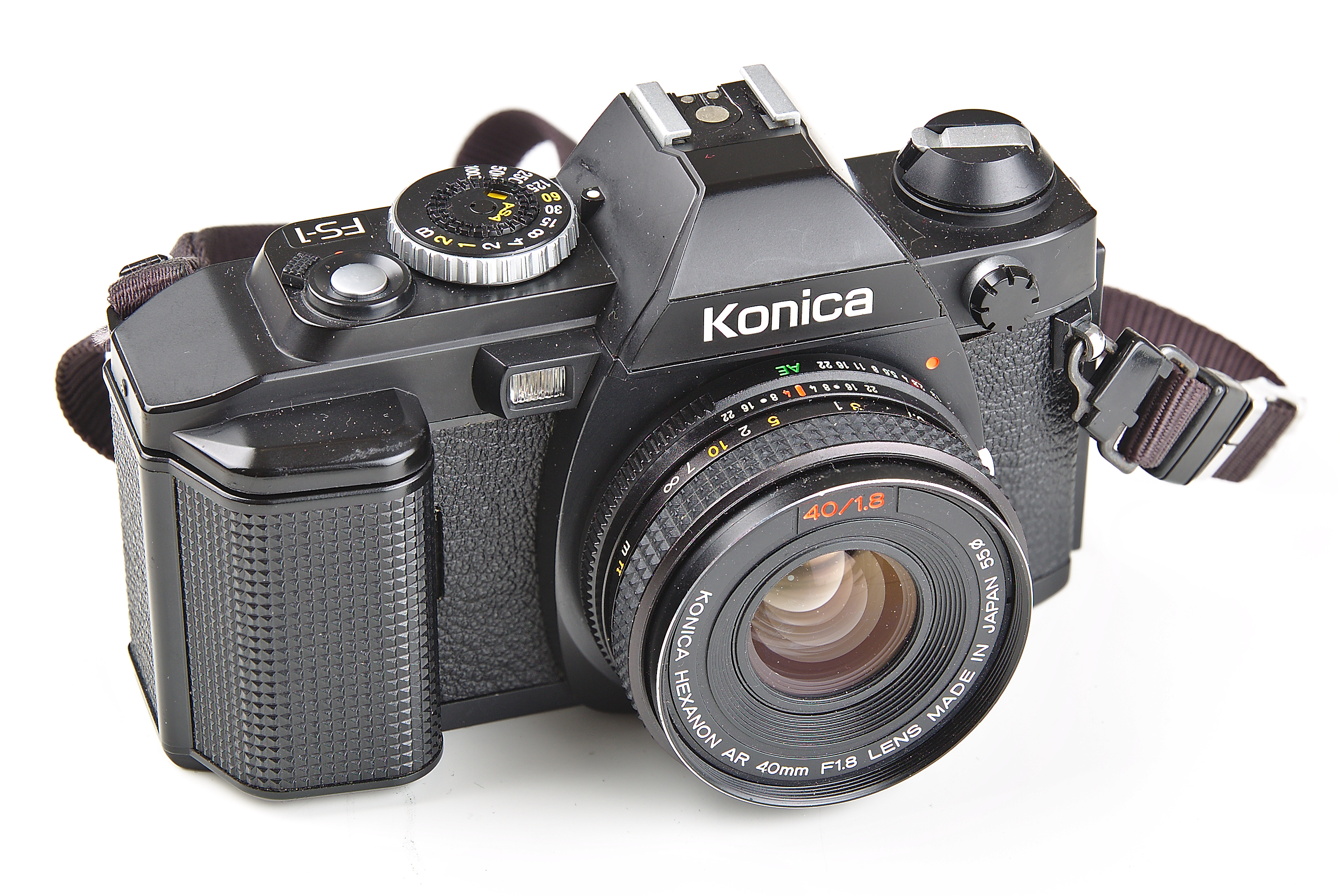
The FS-1 (basis for the FC-1, 1979 presented)

The Konica FC-1 was introduced in 1980 by Konica, one year after the FS-1, but does not have the integrated winder. It was manufactured until 1983. Both models were only available in a black finish. With top covers made from black plastic cast Konica had good experiences since the Autoreflex TC in the mid of the 70s.

Like the FS-1 the FC-1 is a camera with shutter priority and so it has a aperture LED finder display. The shutter is a vertical metal focal plane shutter, like in the Konica F, the first Single-lens reflex camera by Konica in 1960. Shutter and mirror of the FC-1 are electronically controlled. The range of shutterspeeds starts at 1/1000 s and ends at 2s. The self-timer with LED electronically works, too; its delay is round about 10 s. The camera has accessory terminal (use only for dedicated Konica accessories). The FC-1 does not have an on/off switch.

The film loading system of the FC-1 is noteworthy: The camera takes the film tip automatically and there is no need to fire the shutter until the first frame is reached. It was named Autoload. It is possible to use a separate winder, the "Auto Winder F".

Lenses are fixed with the Konica AR-bayonet.

This model was commonly paired with a Konica 40mm Hexanon AR F1.8 lens. The weight of this pancake lens, which has six lenses, is 140 g only. It got an excellent reputation.

== Accessories ==
The Konica flash X-24 was available as for the FS-1 and its successor Konica FT-1. As the name of this flash indicates it has a guide number of 24. The apertures 5.6 or 11 are selectable with a switch at the X-24. And with this flash the shutter speed is 1/100 s. Furthermore a big and powerful, handle-mounted system electronic strobe with a guide number of 36 (metric) / 120 (feet) at ISO 100/21° was offered: the X-36 Auto. Its preselectable apertures are identical to the X-24

Konica Radio Controller Set: This accessory came with a receiver and remote that can be distanced away from the receiver up to 230 feet (70 m) away. The receiver is attached by the tripod socket.

== Lenses by Konica ==
Konica offered lenses with focus from 15 mm up to 2,000 mm; they were named Hexanon. There was also a low-cost, or consumer line, the Hexar line of lenses. All Konica Hexanon lenses have good quality and got a good reputation: this includes the mechanics and less variation between samples.

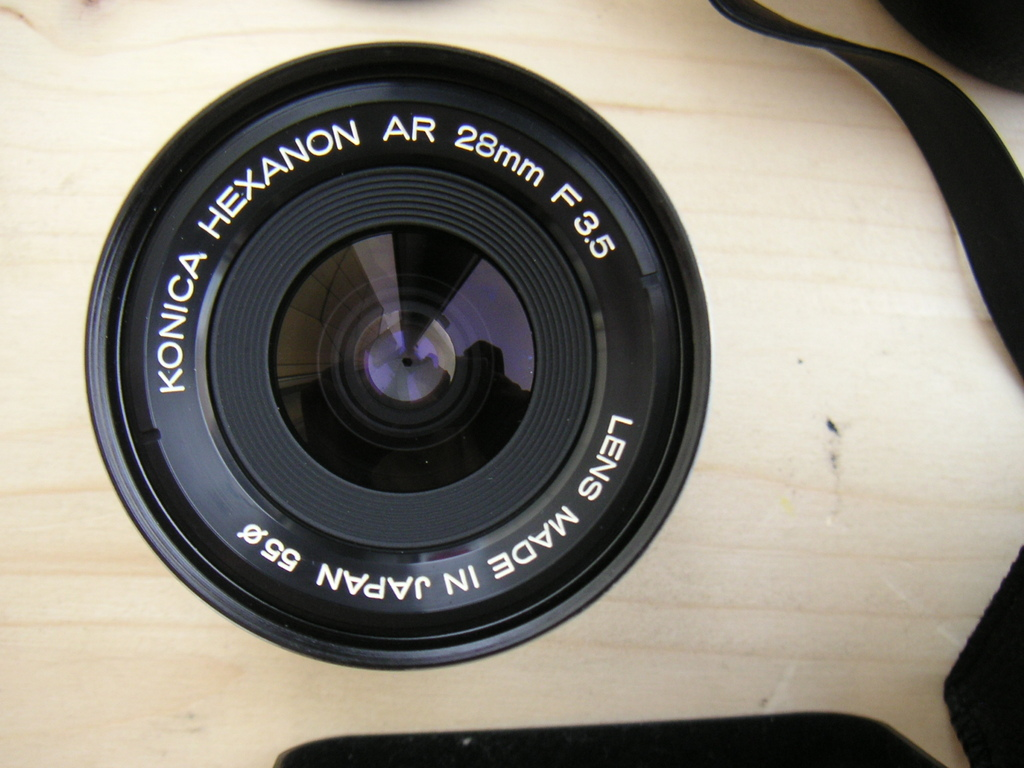
Hexanon 3.5/28 mm

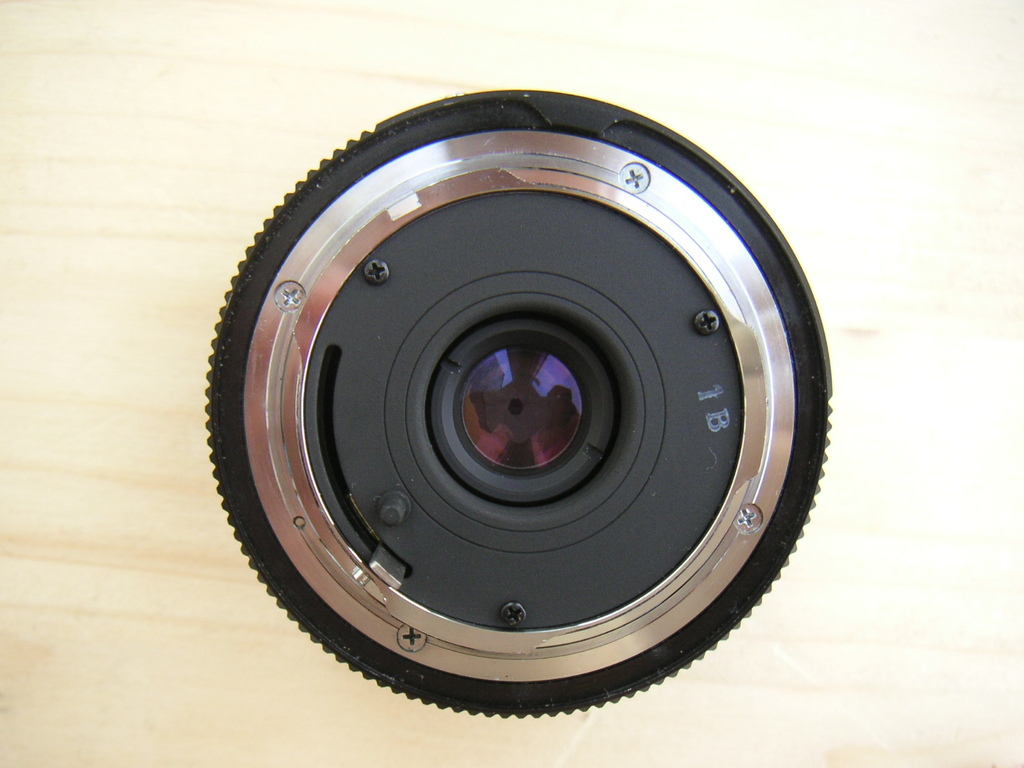
AR-mount (of the Hexanon 3.5/ 28 mm)

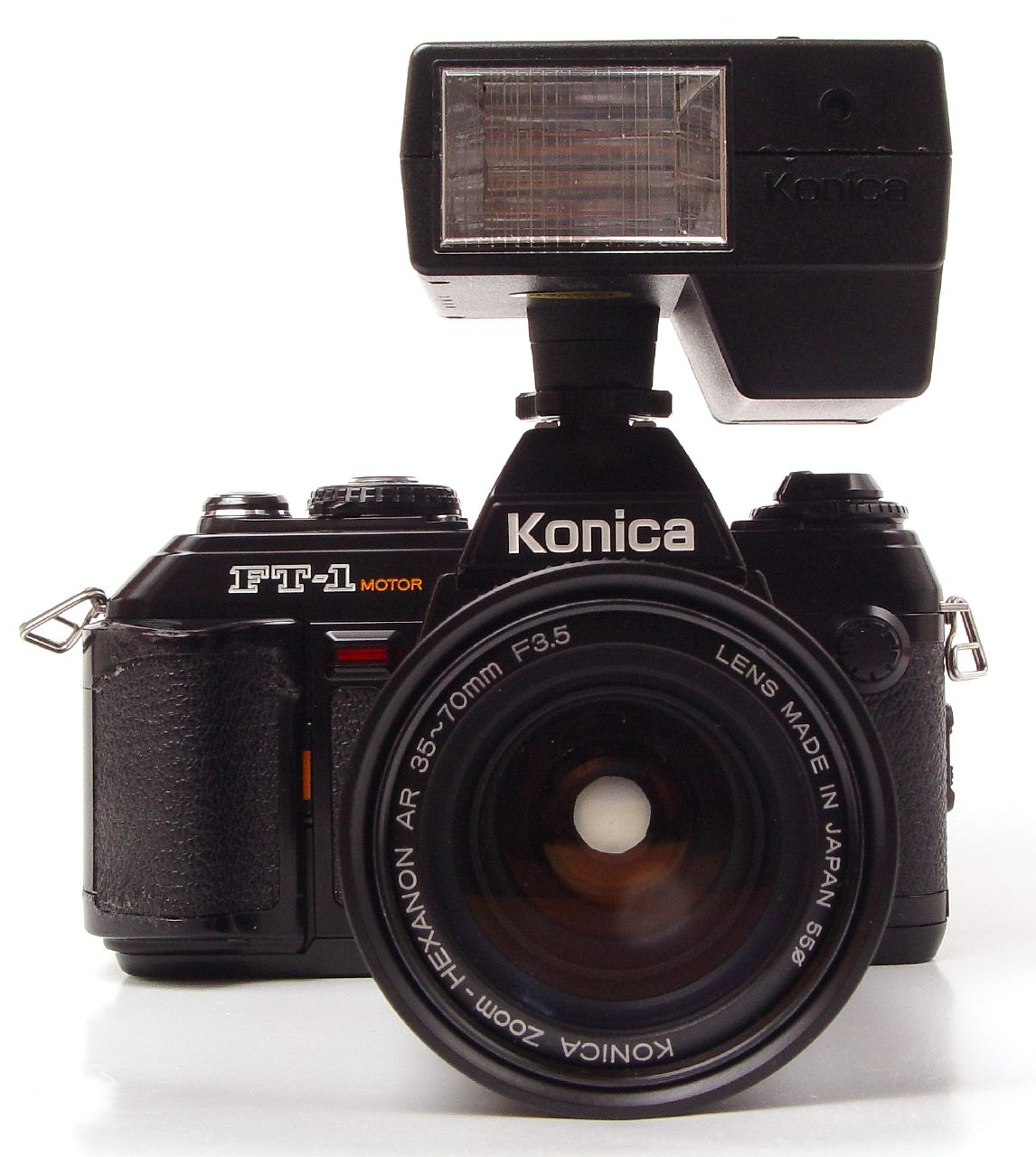
Zoom Hexanon 3.5/35–70 mm (and flash X-24)

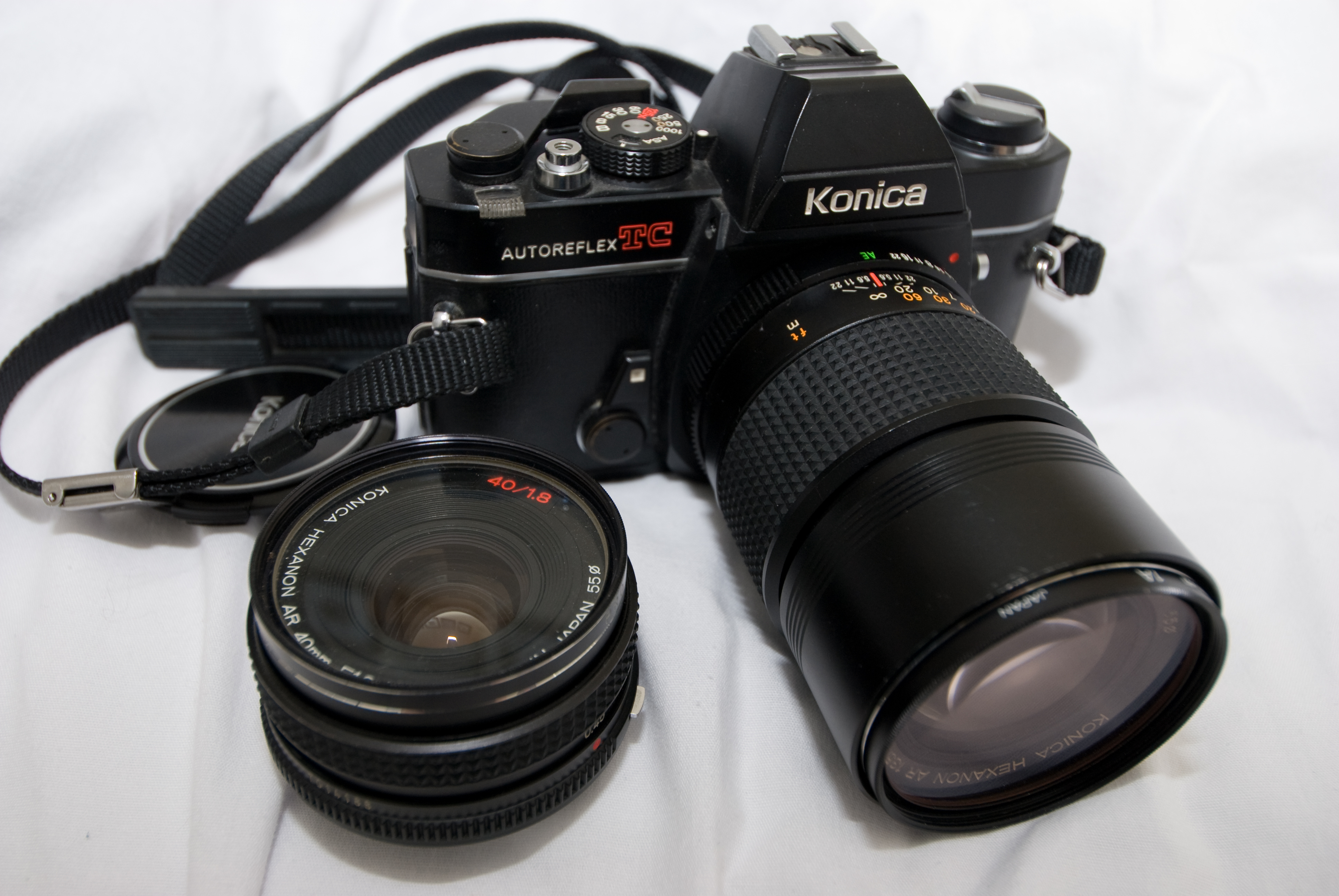
telephoto 135 mm (mounted on a Konica Autoreflex TC)
