= FP1 =

FP1 or FP-1 may refer to:

- Fairphone 1
- FP1, the first round of free practice in Formula One racing
- Fp1: an EEG electrode site according to the 10-20 system
- F.P.1, a fictitious seadrome in a German science-fiction novel and the 1932 film based on it
- Chemex FP-1, type of coffee filter
- Fire Point FP-1, one-way attack drone
- Konica FP-1, camera
- Douglas FP-1, plane
