= Konica Domirex =

Prototype camera

Overview
- Maker: Konica
- Released: 1963

The Konica Domirex was a prototype camera from 1963.

== Background ==
It was a 35mm SLR, using an unusual mirror arrangement to eliminate the need for the mirror to flip up out of the way prior to exposure. It's still an "SLR", although it looks more like a rangefinder or viewfinder camera, b. The reason is that a "single lens reflex" camera, by definition, uses a mirror to reflect light that's passed through the single lens into the viewfinder. The advantage of this is that the user sees exactly what the camera is "seeing". The Domirex uses a number of small mirrors to redirect the image to the viewfinder, rather than a single large mirror along with the bulging pentaprism typical of 35mm SLR cameras.

The iris diaphragm and the leaf shutter are mounted behind the rear lens element.

The system has the disadvantage that focusing must be performed using only a small fraction of the available light.

The Domirex was never put into full production, and apparently only had a fixed, 57mm lens. Screw-on wide-angle and telephoto attachments were also made. The camera existed in two versions, one with a selenium cell and one with a CdS cell.
