= Konica FT-1 =

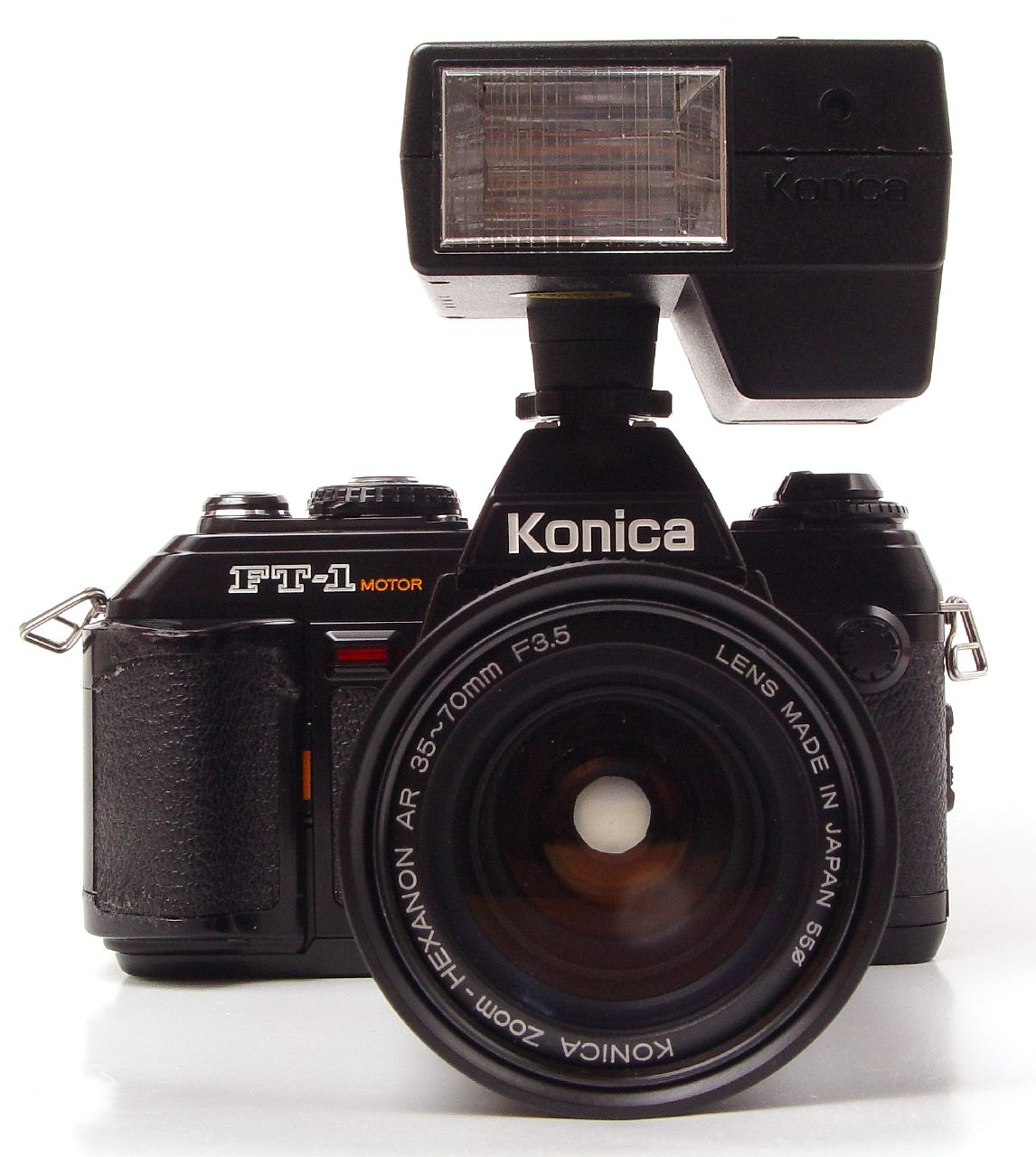

Overview
- Maker: Konishiroku
- Type: 35 mm SLR

Lens
- Lens mount: Konica AR

Sensor/medium
- Film speed: ISO 25 to 3200 [manual]

Focusing
- Focus: Manual

Exposure/metering
- Exposure: Shutter priority, manual
- Exposure metering: EV0.7 to EV19 @ ASA 100

Flash
- Flash: Hot shoe, PC socket
- Flash synchronization: 1/100 s

Shutter
- Shutter speed range: 2 s to 1/1000 s

General
- Battery: 4 AA or AAA
- Dimensions: 91×143×46 mm (3.6×5.6×1.8 in)
- Weight: 570 g (20 oz)
- Made in: Japan

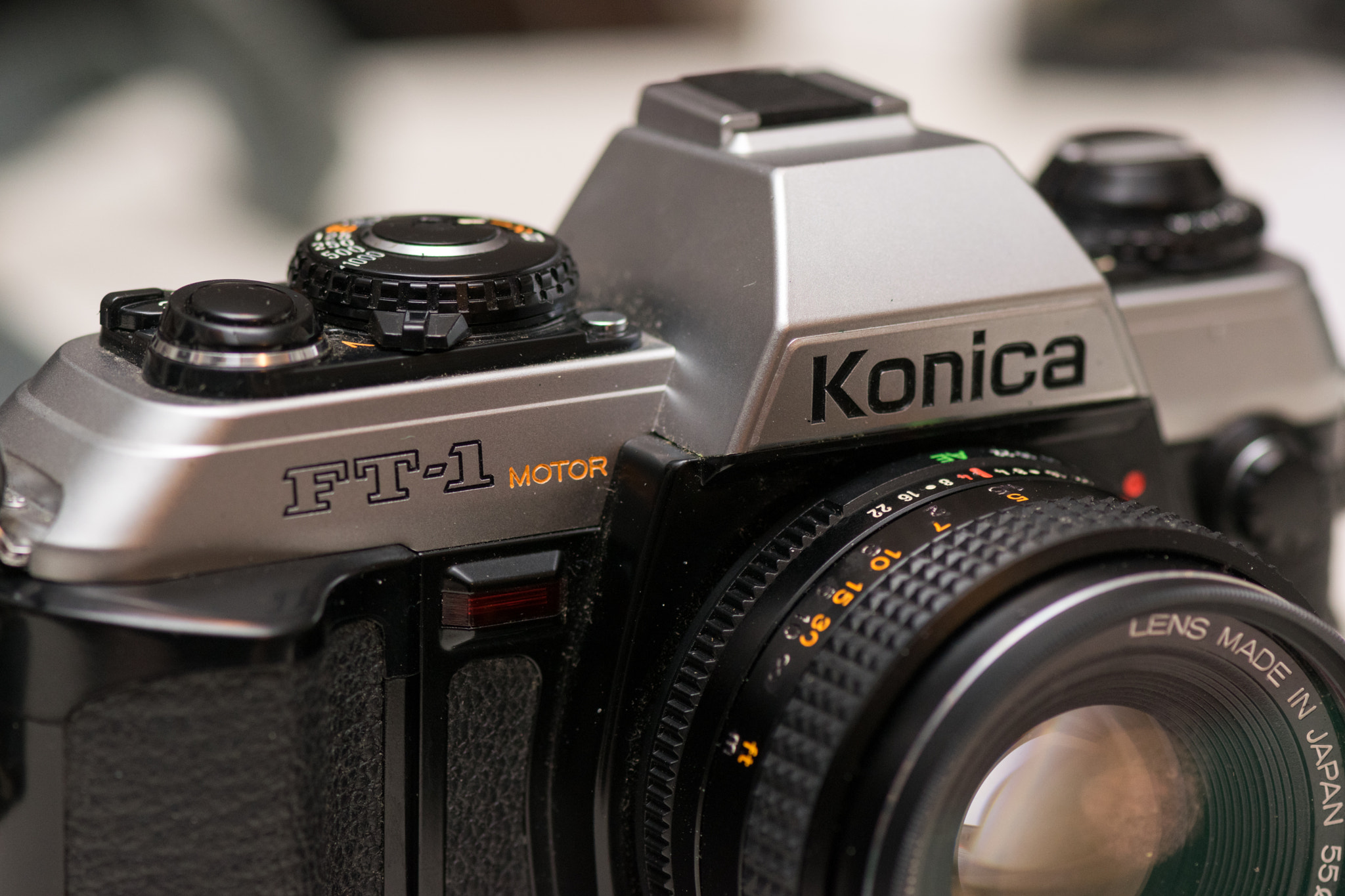
Konica FT-1 with top in silver

The Konica FT-1 was the last SLR to be built both under the Konica name and by Konica themselves. The FT-1 was introduced in 1983 as an improvement on the earlier FS-1.

The changes included a different meter type (using silicon photodiode cells instead of the previously used gallium arsenide cells), improved quality of electronics, and a faster winder speed. It was available with black or silver top of the housing and built until 1987.

Various controls were moved around on the camera, including the ISO film speed setting, the on/off switch, and the self-timer. Newly added controls are the exposure compensation knob and a switch to toggle between continuous (up to 2 frames per second) and single shot exposures. There are some noteworthy features like a film advance indicator, self-timer LED, accessory terminal (use only for dedicated Konica accessories), and an aperture LED finder display. The range of shutterspeeds starts at 1/1000 s and ends at 2s. As in the Konica F, the first Single-lens reflex camera by Konica in 1960, the FT-1 has a vertical metal focal plane shutter, even if it does not reach 1/2000 s, the shortest speed of the F.

The FT-1 uses the FS-1 the Autoload-System for loading the film into the camera.

Lenses are fixed with the Konica AR-mount. Konica offered Hexanon-lenses with focus from 15 mm up to 400 mm. There was no low-cost or consumer line: All Konica lenses have good quality and got a good reputation: this includes the mechanics and less variation between samples.

This model was commonly paired with a Konica 50mm Hexanon AR F1.8 lens and a Sunpak autozoom 333D thyristor flash.

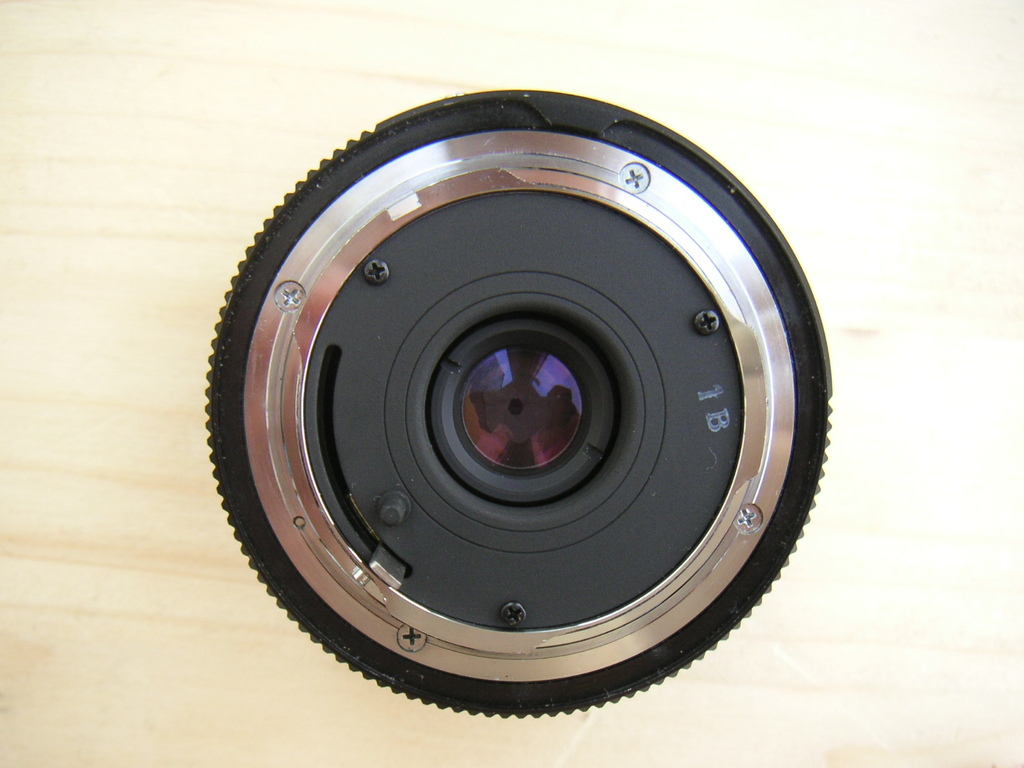
AR-mount (of Hexanon 3.5/ 28 mm)

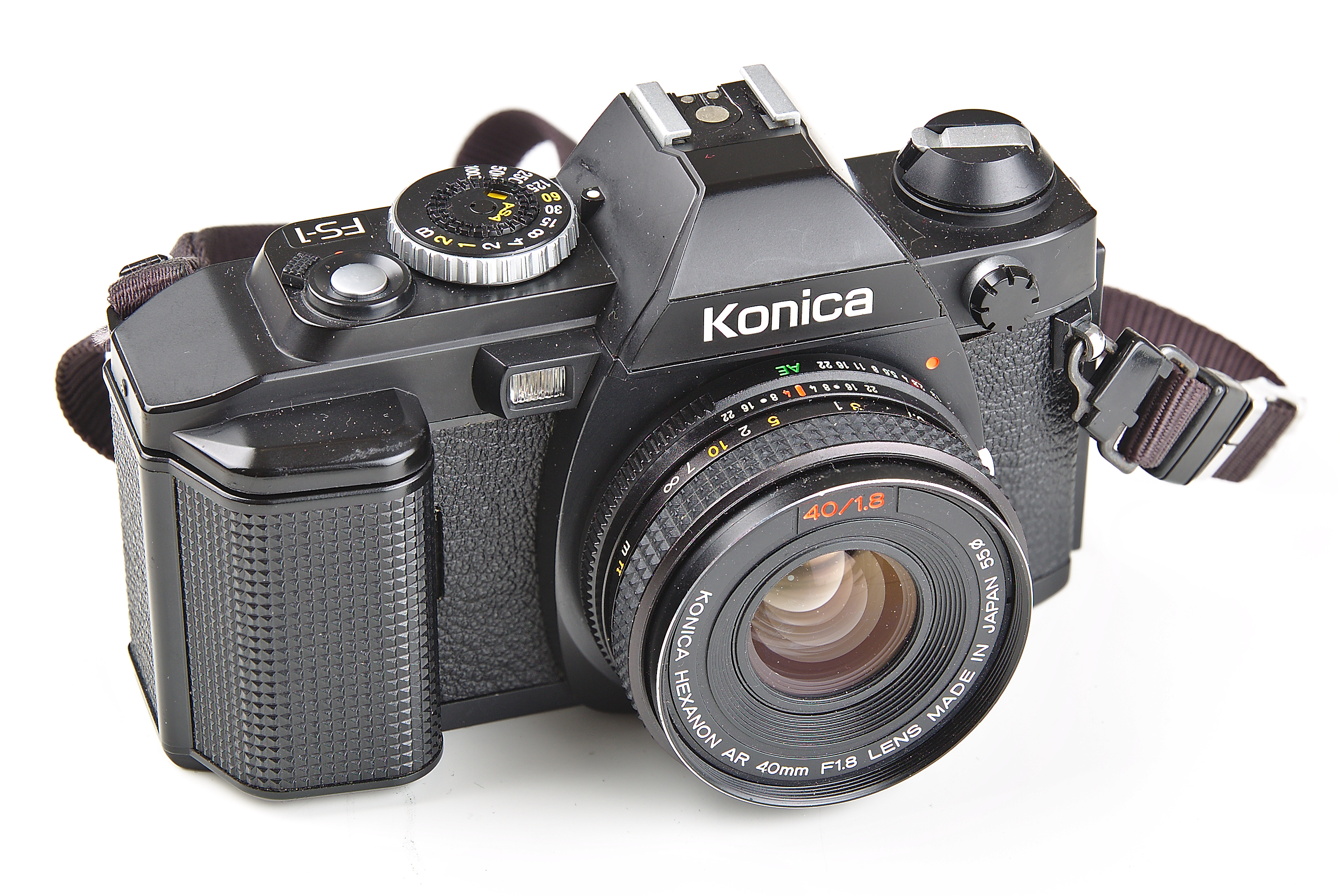
The FS-1 (predecessor, 1979 presented)

== Accessories ==
The Konica flash X-24 with a guide number of 24 was known by the predecessor FS-1. It offers preselection of the apertures 5.6 and 11 and shutterspeed 1/100s. A handle-mounted system electronic strobe with a guide number of 36 (metric) / 120 (feet) at ISO 100/21° (X-36 Auto) was also offered. The preselectable apertures are identical with the X-24.

Konica Radio Controller Set: This accessory came with a receiver and remote that can be distanced away from the receiver up to 230 feet (70 m) away. The receiver is attached by the tripod socket.
