= Konica =

Former Japanese imaging corporation

Konica Corporation
- Native name: コニカ株式会社
- Traded as: TYO: 4902
- Industry: Manufacturing
- Founded: 1873; 153 years ago
- Defunct: August 5, 2003; 23 years ago
- Fate: Merged with Minolta to form Konica Minolta
- Successor: Konica Minolta
- Headquarters: 26-2, Nishishinjuku 1-chome, Shinjuku-ku, Tokyo 163-052 Japan (1998)
- Products: Cameras, film cameras, camera accessories, photocopiers, laser printers
- Number of employees: 17,319 (2002)

Konica (コニカ, Konika) was a Japanese manufacturer of, among other products, film, film cameras, camera accessories, photographic and photo-processing equipment, photocopiers, fax machines and laser printers, founded in 1873. The company merged with Japanese peer Minolta in 2003, forming Konica Minolta.

== History ==
The company traces its history back to 1873 when pharmacist Rokusaburō Sugiura began selling photographic materials at his shop in Konishiya Rokubē, the biggest pharmacy trader in Tokyo at that time.

In 1878, Rokusaburō succeeded to his family and renamed Rokuemon VI (Rokudaime Rokuemon). He gave the original shop to his younger brother and launched a new shop, Konishi Honten (Konishi Main Shop) in the Nihonbashi district of Tokyo.

In 1882, Konishi launched a project to produce photography related materials in Japan which were imported at that time. In 1902, Konishi began to sell the "Cherry Portable Camera" (チェリー手提用暗函), the first Japanese produced end-user oriented camera. New products were released respectively, and Konishi Main Shop became the leading camera company in Japan. In 1921, Konishi had his elder son succeed to the family and thus company head with the name, and in this occasion Konishi Honten was turned into a company Konishiroku Honten. The name Konishiroku was taken from the abbreviation of their names, Konishi Rokuemon.

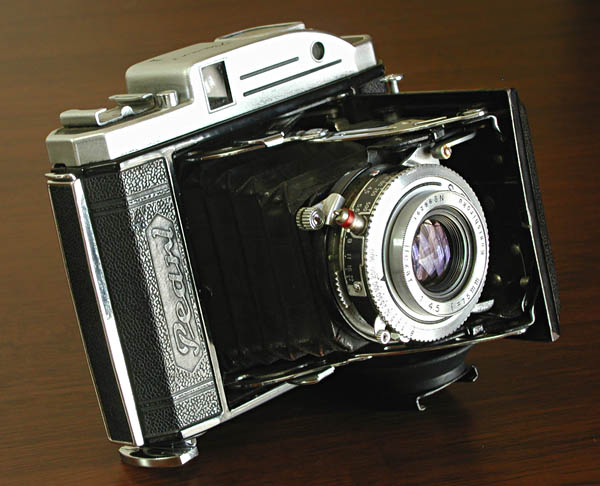
Konica Pearl II, Medium format camera

Konishiroku released their "Konica I" type camera in 1948, after which they would name their own company in 1987. Since 1949 Konica produced a Medium format-camera Pearl. From 1964 until 1975 Konica manufactured Medium format Omega-cameras, which used Konica's Hexanon-lenses; they were named Koni-Omega for the global market. Two models were named Konica Press for the Japanese market.

Konica's single lens reflex cameras pioneered auto-exposure in cameras with focal-plane shutters and fully interchangeable lenses. The Konica Autoreflex of 1965 used an external light meter cell to set the lens diaphragm automatically after the user selected a shutter speed. With the Autoreflex T of 1968, Konica improved this design into a through-the-lens meter, using the same automation system (the user could also set the exposure manually on these cameras). Other camera makers eventually adopted auto-exposure as well, but Konica was the first.

When Konishiroku got the new name Konica in 1987, the company employed about 4,935 people. In the 1990s Konica signed its first major contract with Los Angeles County providing leasing of copiers to the Los Angeles Superior Court. This resulted in a major shift in the industry that had sold only copiers before. The initial order of 250 copiers required Konica to redirect all of its inventory throughout North America to the county.

On 5 August 2003, Konica merged with Minolta to form Konica Minolta. In 2006, Konica Minolta exited the photography business. In March 2006, the merged company closed down its photo imaging division, which produced color film, color paper, photo chemicals and digital minilab machines. Its digital SLR camera section was transferred to Sony, currently known as the Sony Alpha line. Dai Nippon (DNP) purchased Konica's Odawara factory site and continues to produce paper under its own brand, while Seapac acquired the Konica chemical factory.

=== Film ===
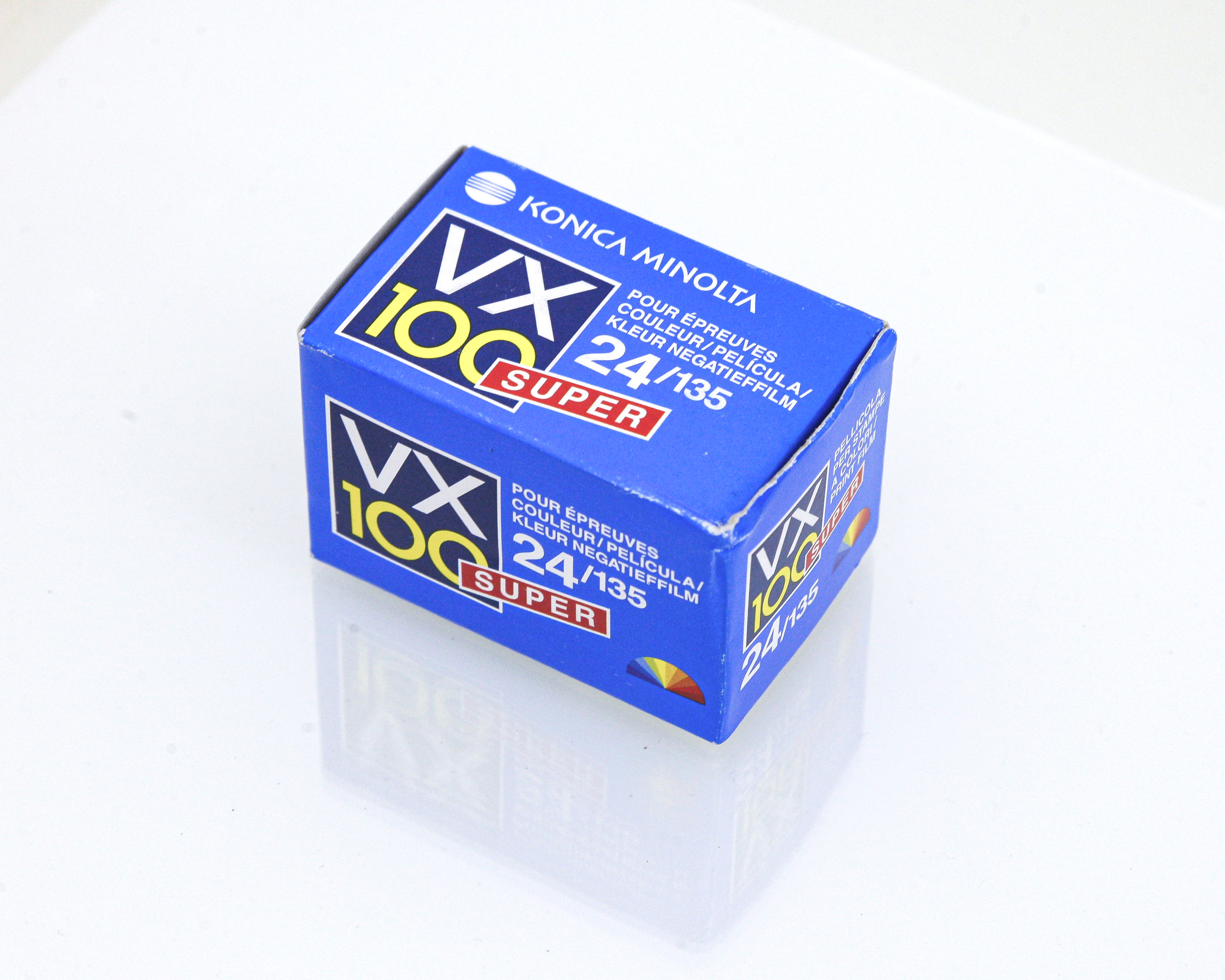
Konica Minolta VX100 Super 35mm color film

Konica was a major producer of 35mm film and related products, including film development processors and printing technology. Originally Konica film and paper was sold under the brand name "Sakura" (cherry blossom).

In the mid-1980s, Konica launched its SR range of film, then SR-V (1987), SR-G (1989), Super SR (1991), Super XG (1993), VX and finally "Centuria" in 1999.

=== Cameras ===
==== 35 mm ====
===== Rangefinder and viewfinder cameras =====
- Rubikon (1936?) Prototype of Konica I, development stopped by WWII, a few made after war
- Rubicon (1936?) An X-ray camera that uses 35mm X-ray film, same chassis as Rubikon/Konica I
- Konica "I" (1946) Konishiroku's first 35mm camera to see full production. Several variants (lenses, shutters, viewfinder, flash mount).
- Konica II (1950)
- Konica IIB (1960) (Variants with f3.5 and f2.8 lenses)
- Konica IIB-m (1956)
- Konica IIA (1956) First model to use the superb 48mm f2 Hexanon lens.
- Konica III (1956) Variants with Konirapid-S & Seikosha MXL shutters, most with 48/2 lens, rarer version w/48mm f2.4 Hexanon
- Konica IIIA (1958) Variants with 48/2 & 50/1.8 Hexanons
- Konica IIIM (1959) Variants with Copal MXV & Seikosha SLV shutters, all with 50/1.8 Hexanon. Built-in meter, 1st Konica w/hot shoe (non-standard)
- Konilette 35 (1959) Inexpensive 35mm with scale focus, Konitor 45/3.5 lens.

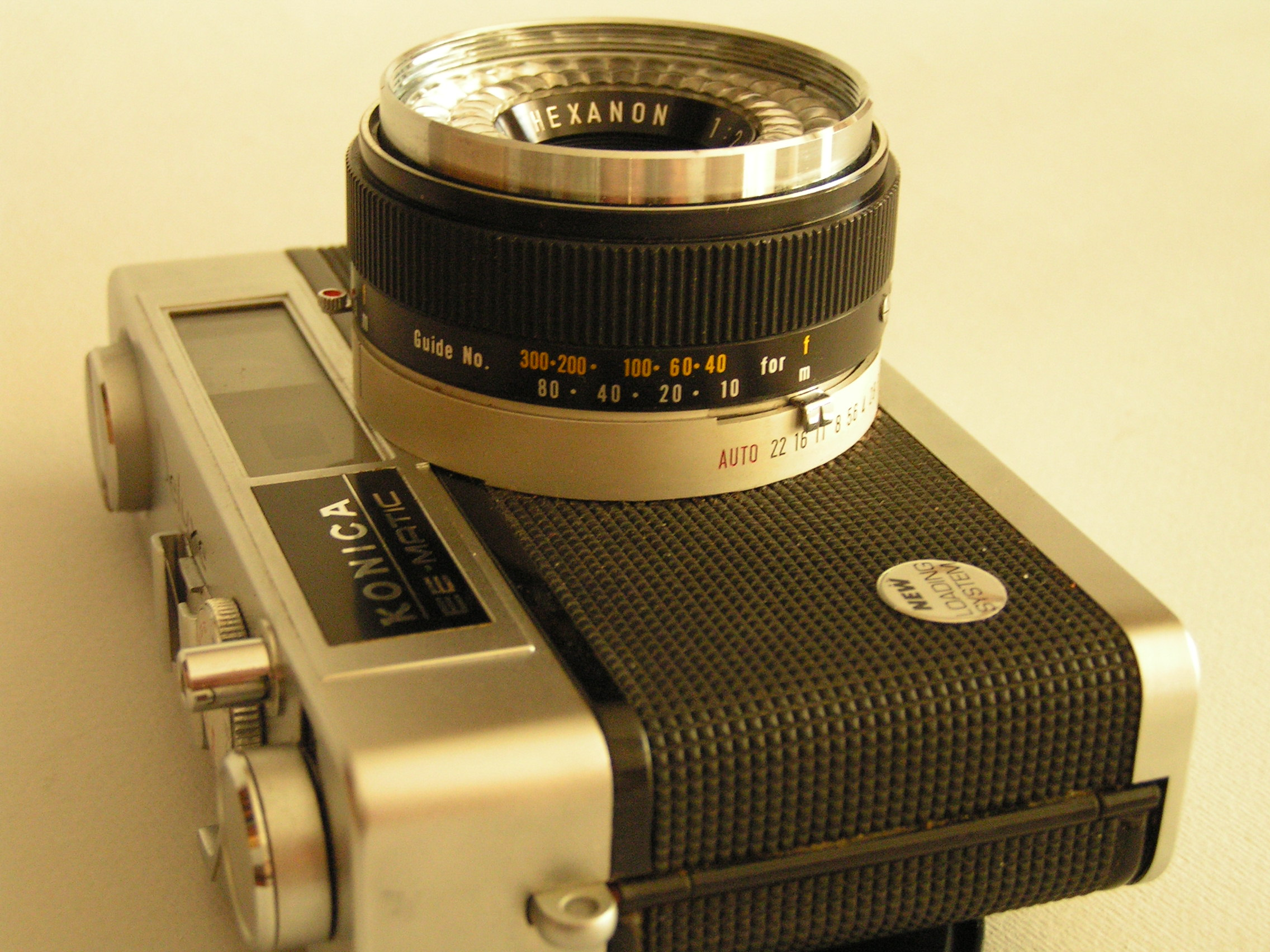
Konica EE-Matic Deluxe, 1965

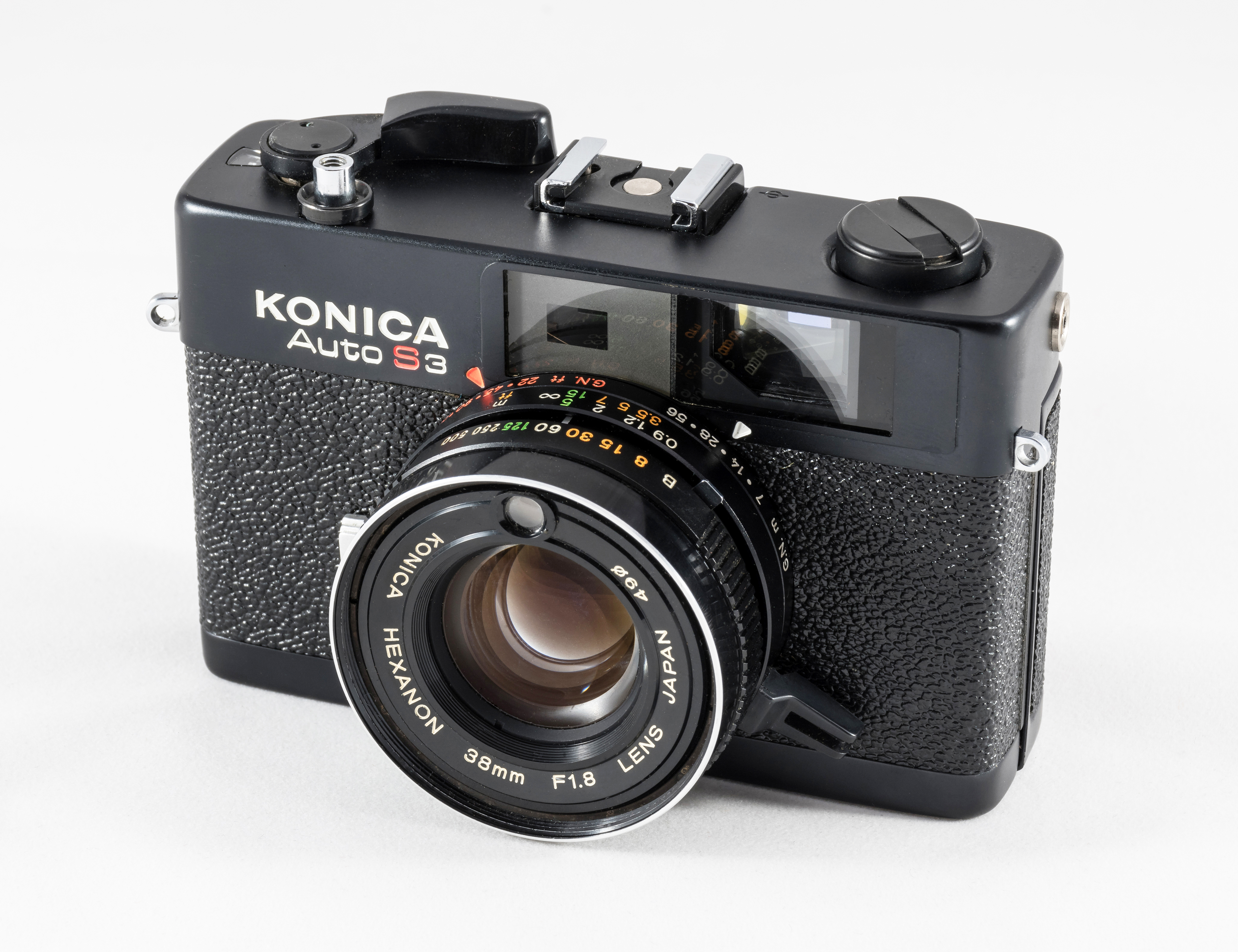
Konica S3

- Konica S (1959) with exposure meter. Lens variants: 45/2.8 Hexar, Hexanon 48/2, 48/1.8
- Konica L (1960) Hexar 45/2.8 lens, Seikosha L shutter, interesting fold down film door.
- Konica S II (1961) only offered with Hexanon 48/2
- Konica S III (1963) new chassis, similar to Auto S, also uses 47/1.9 Hexanon same as Auto S
- Konica EE-Matic (1963) AE only, selenium metering cell (no battery). Also sold as Wards xp500/500a.
- Konica Auto S (1963) First CdS-metered, auto exposure camera. Also sold as Wards am450/am550, Revue Auto S.
- Konica EYE (1964) Half frame camera. Also sold as Wards EYE.
- Konica Auto S2 (1965) Also sold as Wards am551.
- Konica EE-Matic S (1965) Downgrade of orig. EE-Matic, no rangefinder. Also sold as Wards xp400.
- Konica EE-Matic 260 (196?) A version of EE-Matic using 126 film. Also sold as Wards cp301 & Wards 260.
- Konica EE-Matic Deluxe (1965) Primary upgrade, wider ASA range for meter, improved lens. Wards xp501.
- Konica EE-Matic Deluxe "New" (1965) Improved film take-up spindle, easier loading. Wards xp501a.
- Konica Auto SE (1966) Wind-up "motorized" film advance. Great lens! Wards ep504, Revue Auto SE. First Konica with a standard hot shoe.
- Konica Auto S1.6 (1967) Faster f1.6 lens. Hot shoe.
- Konica EE-Matic Deluxe 2 (1967) Sold also as Wards rf450.

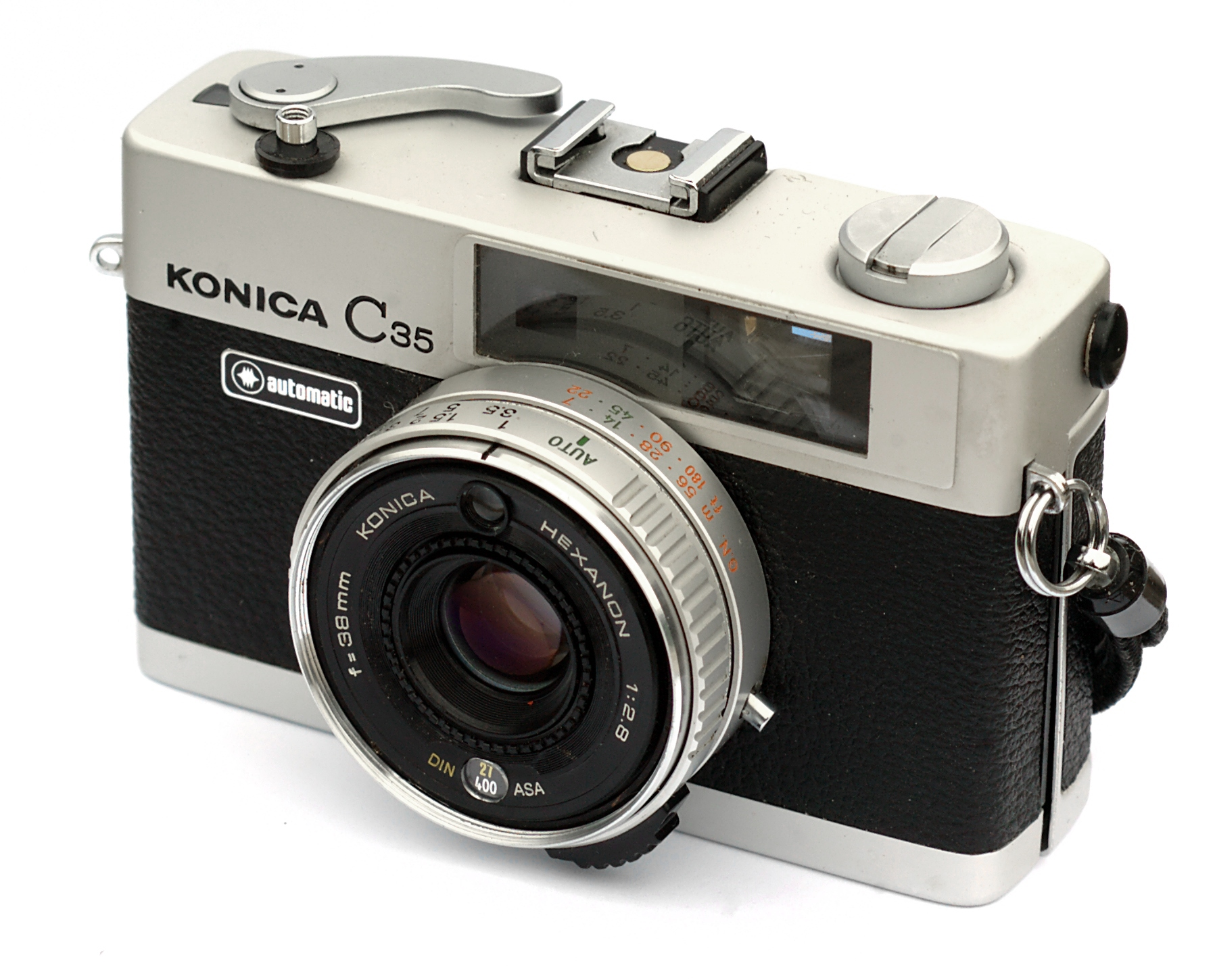
Konica C35 automatic, 1968

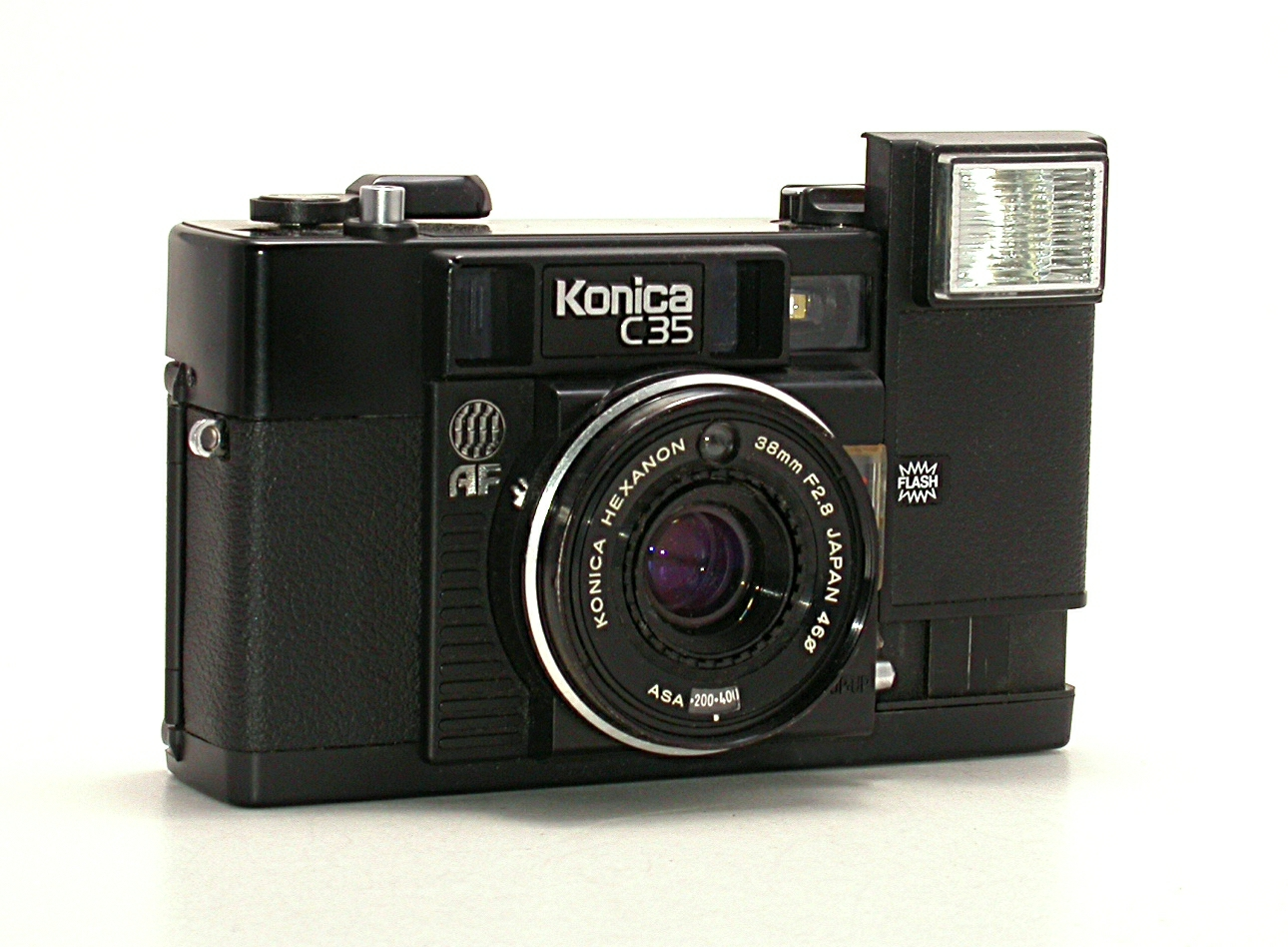
Konica C35 AF

- Konica Auto S 261 (1967) A 126 film version of Auto S line, CdS metered. Wards cp302, Wards 261.
- Konica C35 (chrome version) (1967) best seller compact camera. "Journey" nickname, for small size, portability.
- Konica Electron (1967)
- Konica C35 (black version) (1967)
- Konica C35 Flashmatic (Japan) (1968) "C35 Automatic" (export). Chrome & black versions.
- Konica C35 E&L (Japan) (1969) C35 economical model. No rangefinder. "C35 V" (export)
- Konica Auto S3 (export) (1973) Great little camera based upon the C35 line. Fast lens. AE only. "C35 FD" in Japan. Auto S3 produced in black only. C35 FD produced in chrome, too.
- Konica C35 EF (1976) first model with built-in flash. "Pikkari"
- Konica C35 AF (1977) First autofocus camera, "Jasupin", 1,000,000 sold.

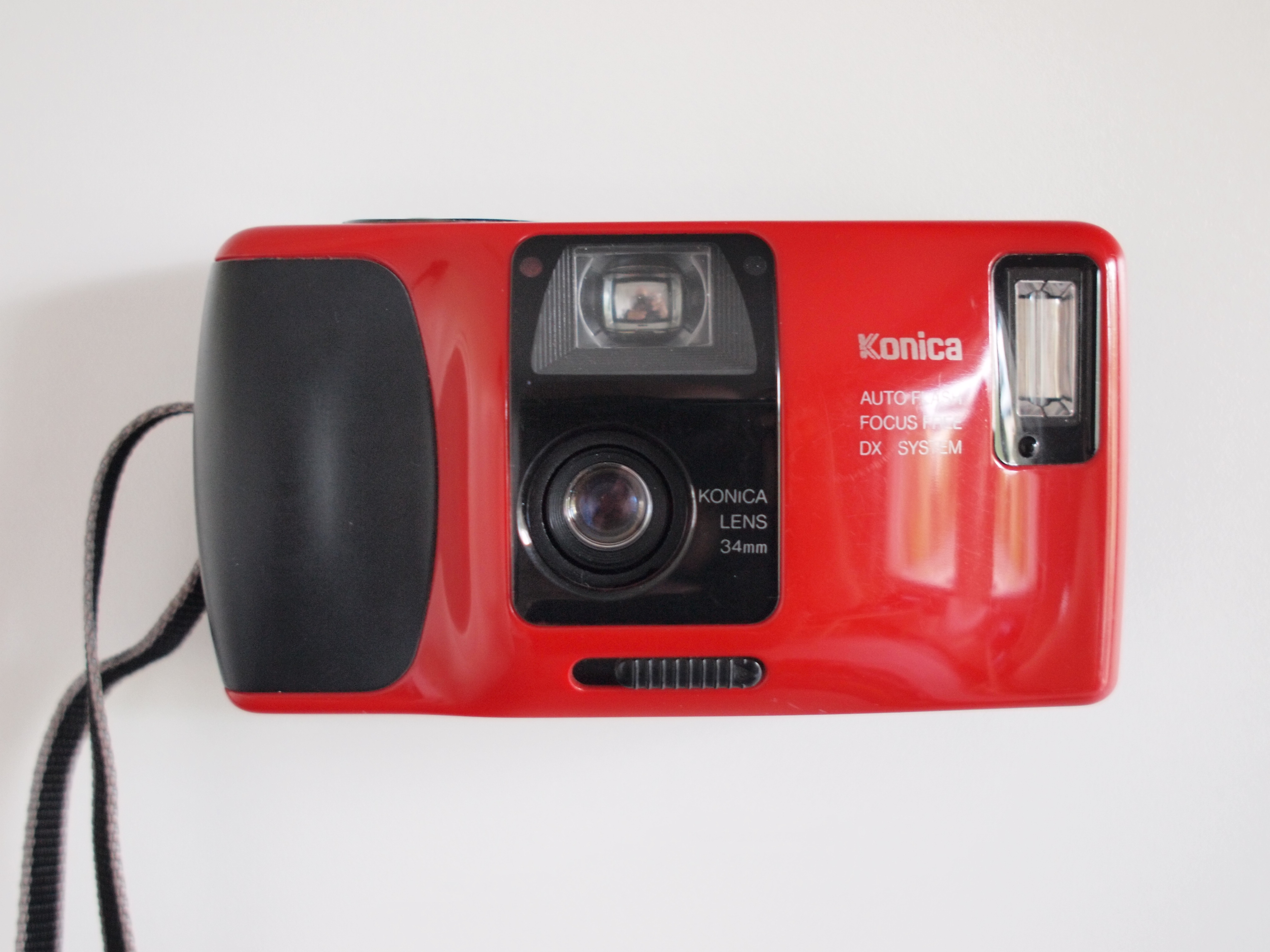
The 1991 Konica Top's supported DX coded film

- Konica C35 EF "New" Self-timer added.
- Konica C35 EFP (1977)
- Konica C35 EF3 (1981) "Color Pikkari"
- Konica C35 AF2 (198?)
- Konica C35 EFJ (1982) "Konica POP" (export markets)
- Konica C35 MF (1982) Auto focus. "Jasupin Super". C35 MD-D, version with date back.
- Konica C35 AF3 (1983) Auto focus. Last "C35"
- Konica MG (1983) Also MG-D variant with date back.
- Konica EFP2 (1984)
- Konica MR70 (1985)
- Konica AA-35/Recorder (1985) Half frame, various colors. Recorder: Japan. AA-35: Export markets.
- Konica MT-7, MT-9, MT-ll (1986) "Multi" 7, 8 & 9 in Japan.
- Konica EFP3
- Konica MR70 LX
- Konica Off Road/Genba Kantoku/MS-40, 1988–2001, dust and water resistant

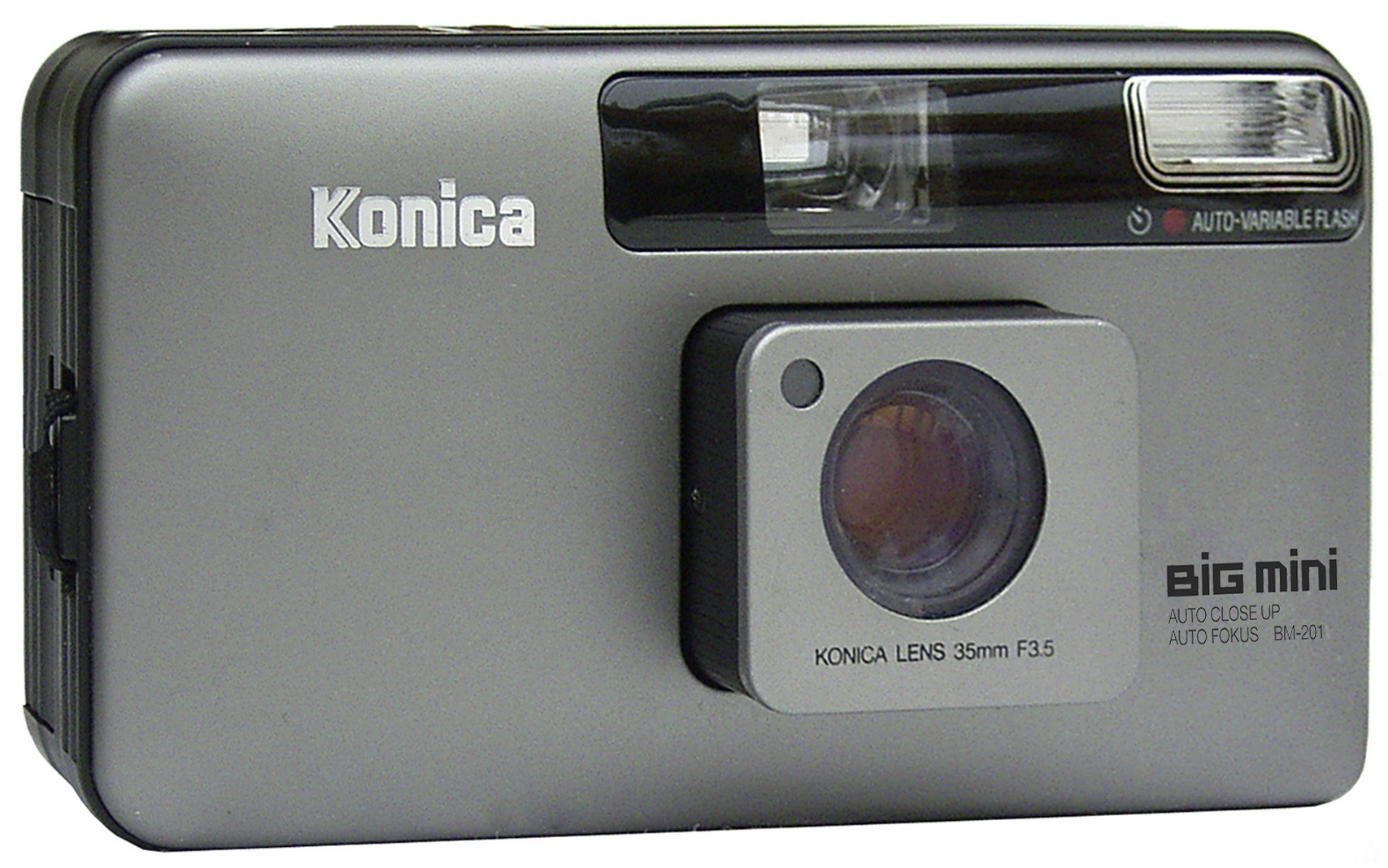
Konica Big Mini, 1990

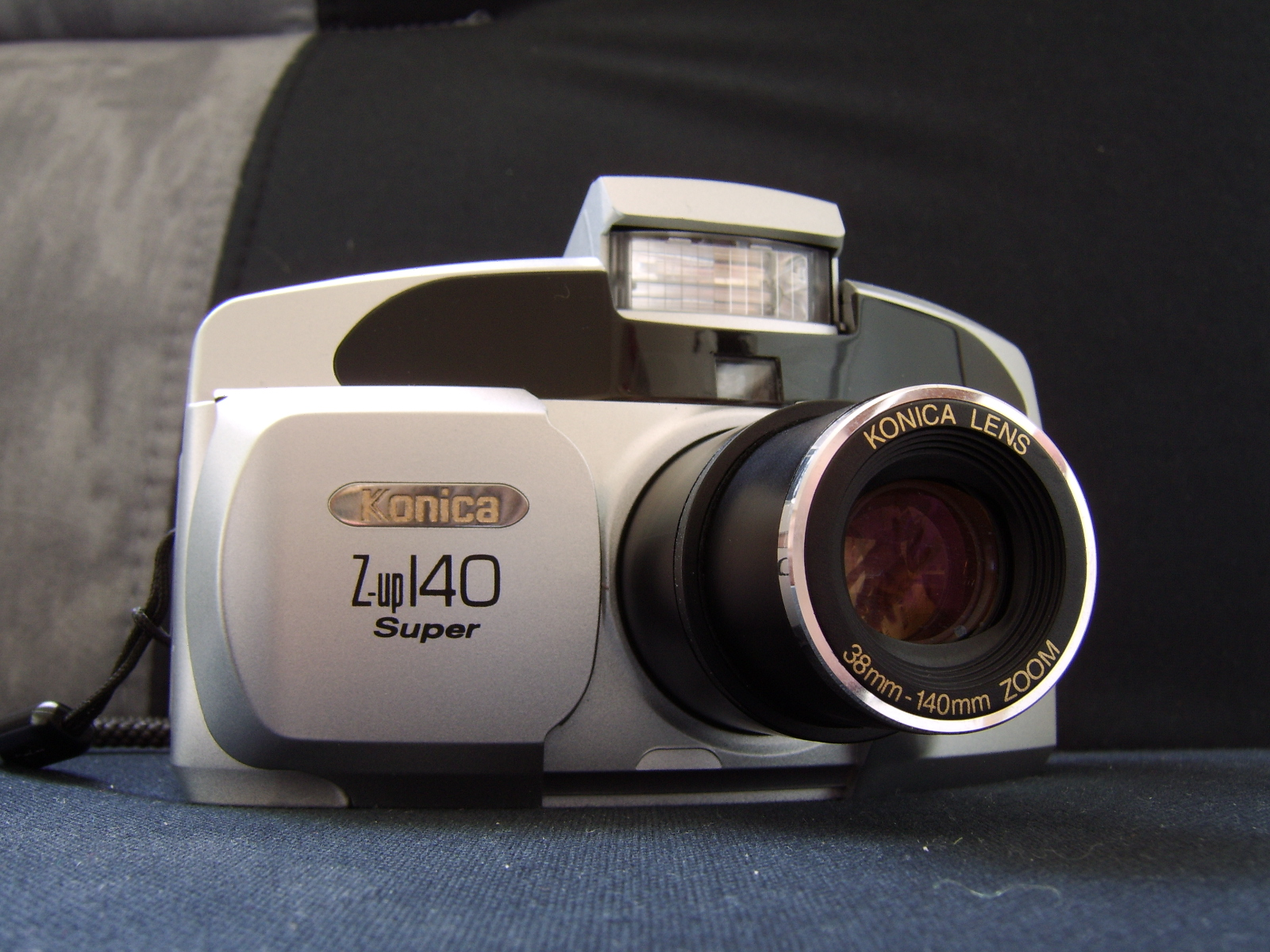
Konica Z-Up 140 Super, 1996

- Konica Z-Up 70 & Z-Up 70 VP
- Konica Z-Up 80 & Z-Up 80 RC
- Konica Tomato
- Konica Kanpai Voice activated camera.
- Konica Big Mini (BM-201), 1990
- Konica Z-Up 28W
- Konica MT-100
- Konica Jump Auto
- Konica Aiborg, 1991
- Konica Top's, 1991
- Konica Big Mini Neo, 1993, zoom, panoramic function
- Konica Off Road 28WB Wide & 28HG7
- Konica BIG mini BM-510Z, 1993, zoom-lenses 35–70 mm
- Konica Big Mini TR (BM-610Z), 1995, zoom-lenses 28–70 mm
- Konica Big Mini Nou 135, 1995, zoom-lenses 38–135 mm
- Konica Big Mini BM S-100, 1996, Advanced Photo System-camera
- Konica Big Mini F, f/2.8 instead of f/3.5

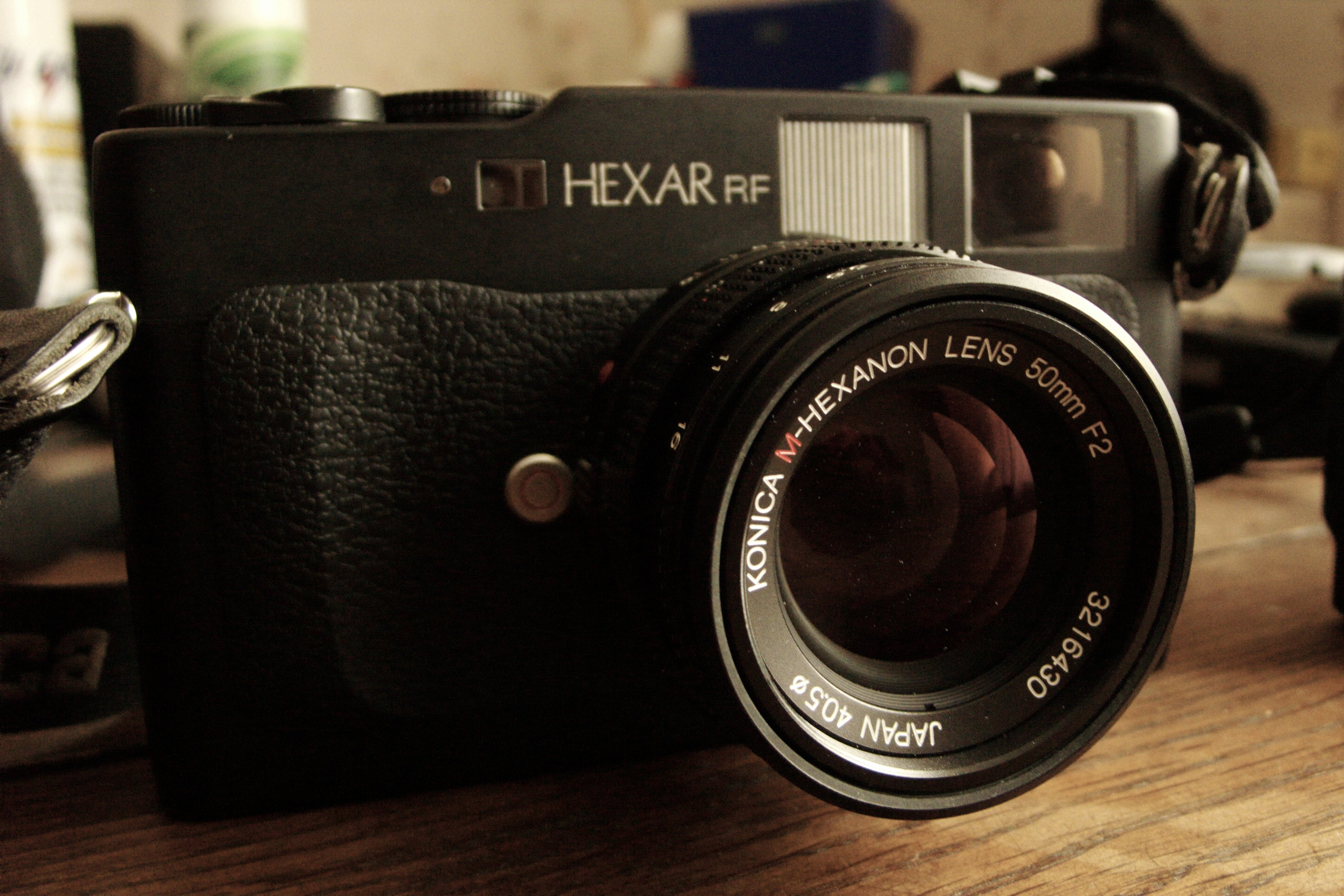
Hexar RF, 2000

- Konica Z-Up 60
- Konica Z-Up 90
- Konica Z-Up 110
- Konica Z-Up 120
- Konica Z-Up 130
- Konica Z-Up 135 (1995)
- Konica Z-Up 140 (1996)
- Konica Z-Up 150 (about 2003)
- Konica Hexar (1991) (autofocus)
- Konica Hexar RF (2000)

===== F-mount 35mm SLRs =====
The first series of Konica single-lens reflex cameras used the Konica F lens mount, named after the first camera to use it. This was a bayonet mount, and is not compatible with later Konica lens mounts. The flange focal distance of the F-mount was 40.5 mm, one of the smallest ever used for a 35 mm SLR. The diameter was 40 mm.

It is not identical to Nikon F-mount, which has a much longer flange focal distance of 46.5 mm.

- Konica F (1960-?)
- Konica FS (1962–1964)
- Konica FSW (1962-?
- Konica FP (1963-?)
- Konica FM (1965-?)

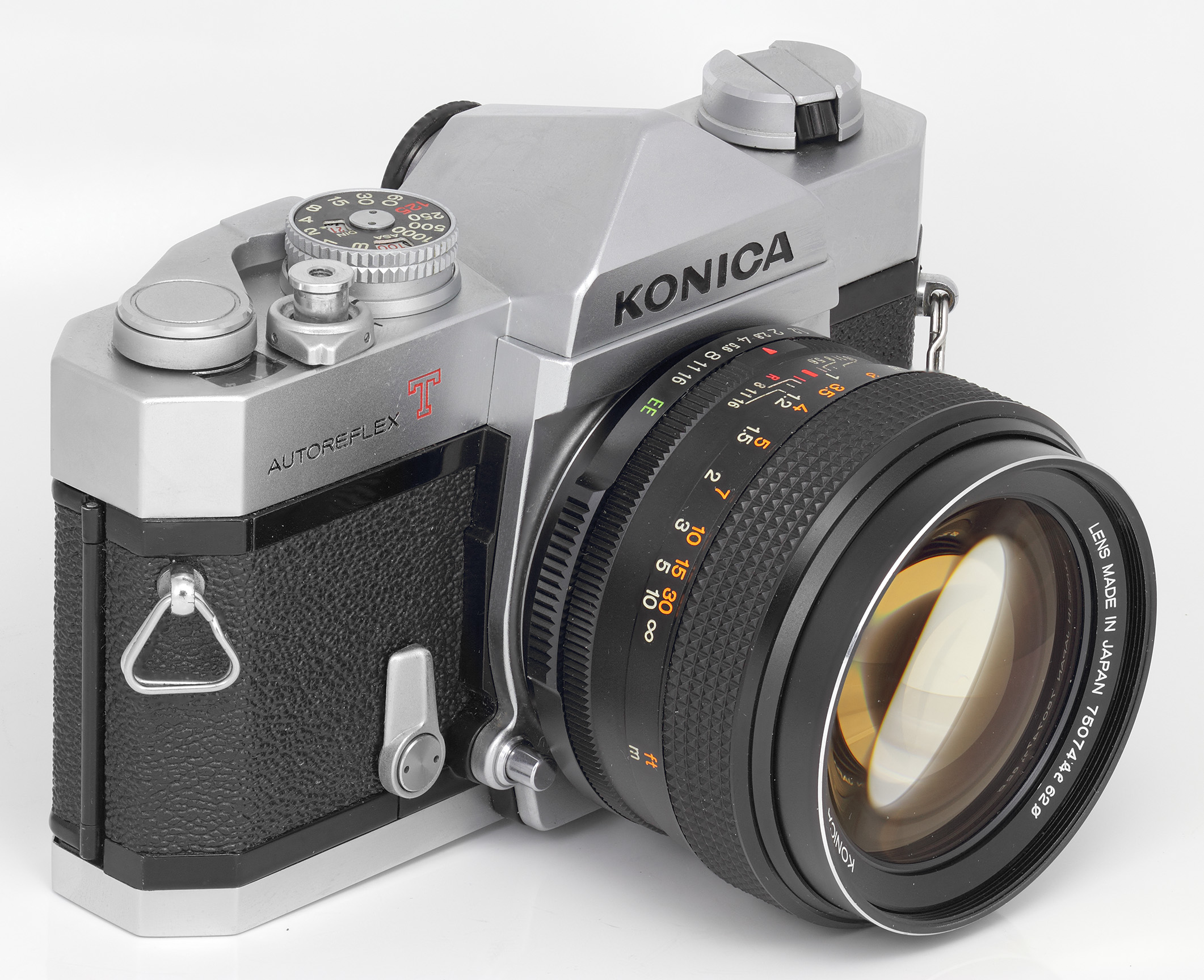
Konica Autoreflex T, 1970, with Hexanon 57mm F1.2

===== Fixed-Lens 35mm SLR Camera =====
- Konica Domirex (1963-?, prototype)

===== AR-mount 35mm SLRs =====
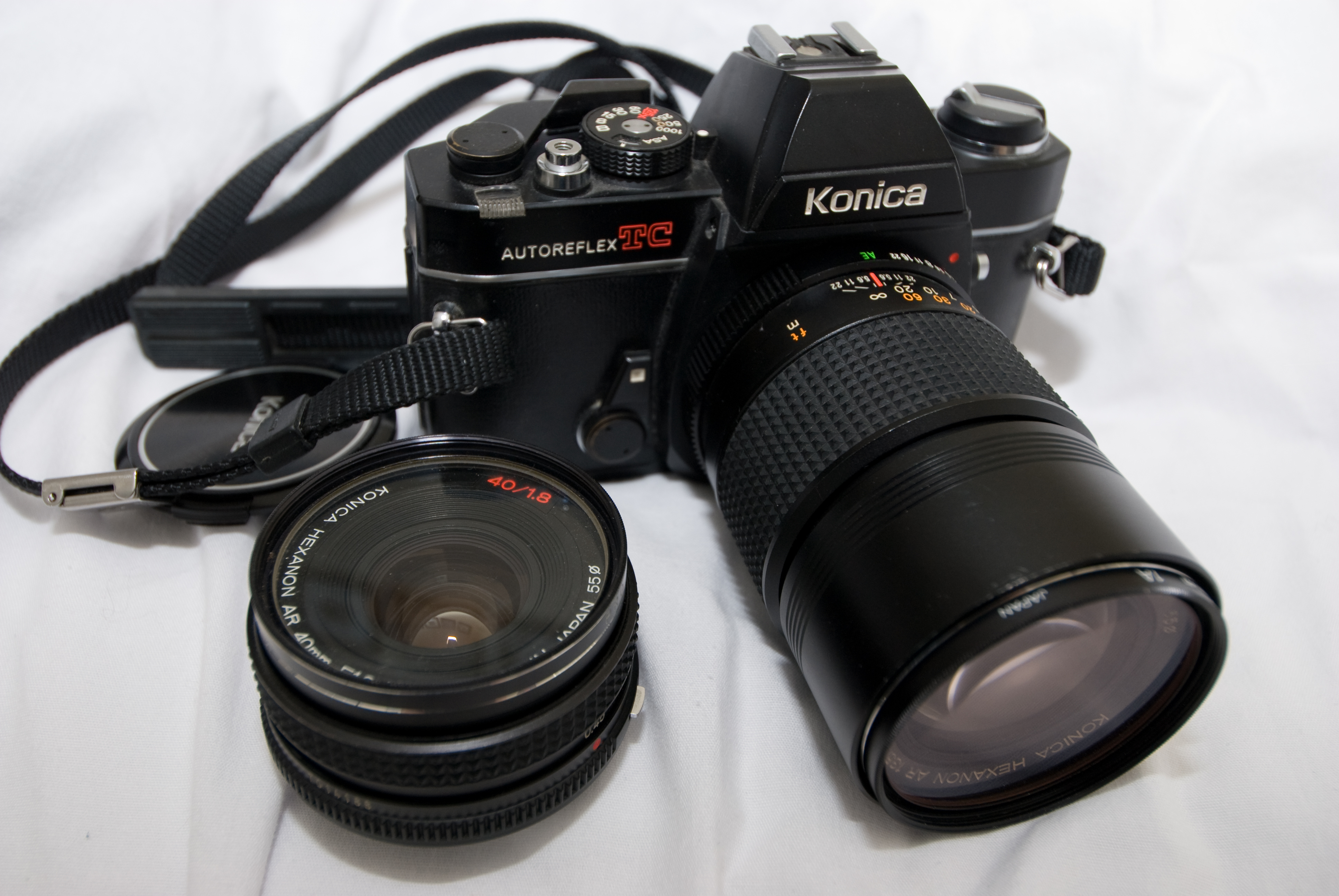
Konica Autoreflex TC (1976–1982) with Hexanon-lenses, left Pancake 1,8

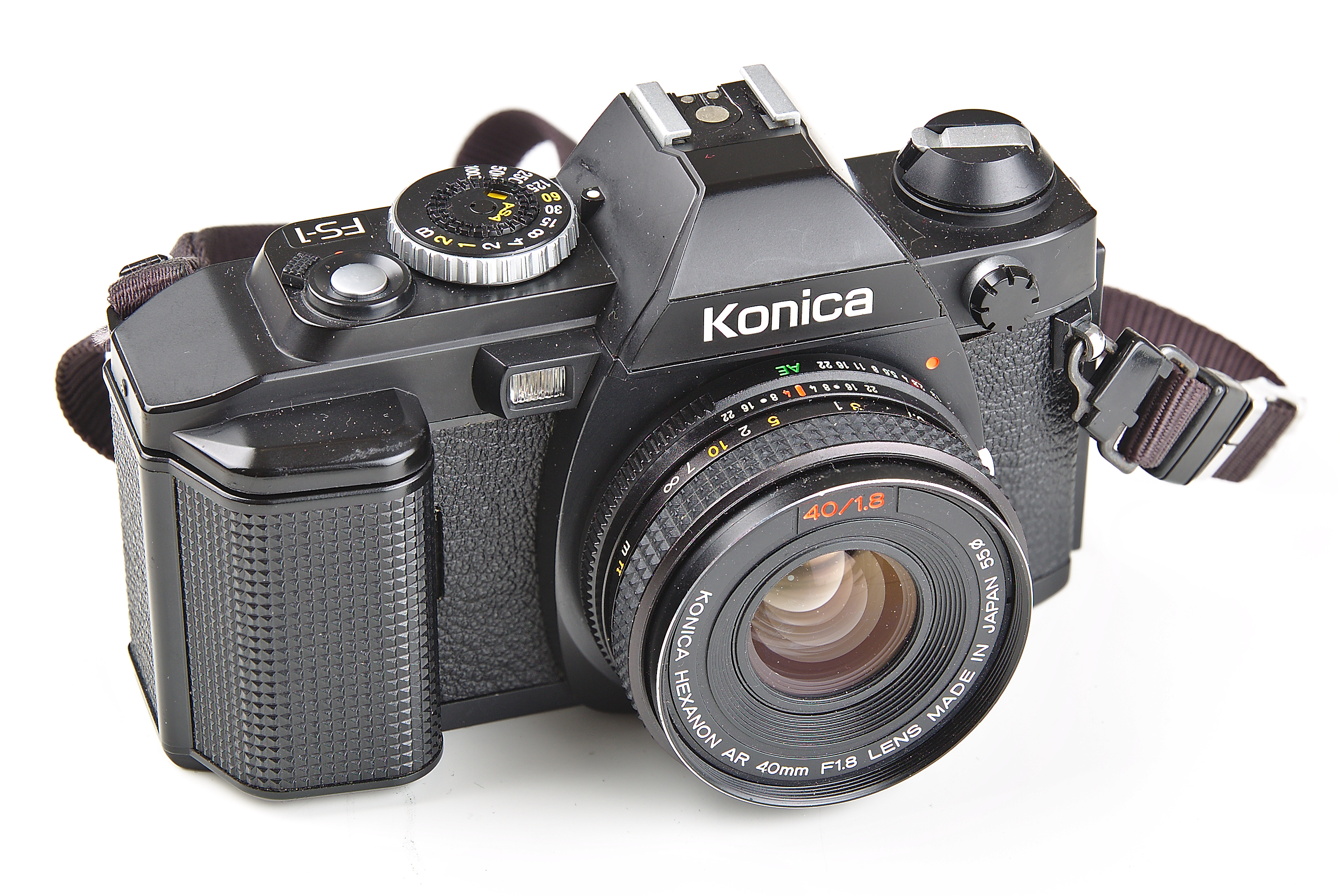
Konica FS-1, world's first SLR with built-in motor drive

Konica's second series of SLR cameras began with 1965's Auto-Reflex. This line came to an end in 1987 when Konica abandoned the SLR market.

Konica's AR lens mount kept the same flange-film distance that the earlier Konica F lens mount had (40.5 mm), but it has a larger diameter of 47 mm.

- Konica Auto-Reflex (1965–1968) Known as the Autorex in Japan.
- Konica Auto-Reflex P (1966–1968) Known as the Autorex P in Japan.
- Konica Autoreflex T (1968–1970)
- Konica Autoreflex A (1968–1971)
- Konica Autoreflex T2 (1970–1973)
- Konica Autoreflex A2 (1971–1972)
- Konica Autoreflex A1000 (1972–1973)
- Konica Autoreflex T3 (1973–1975)
- Konica Autoreflex A3 (1973-?)
- Konica Autoreflex T3N (1975–1978)
- Konica Autoreflex TC (1976–1982)
- Konica Autoreflex T4 (1978–1979)
- Konica FS-1 (1979–1983)
- Konica FC-1 (1980–1983)
- Konica FP-1 (1981–1983)
- Konica FT-1 (1983–1987)
- Konica TC-X (1985–1988) Built by Cosina.

==== Medium format ====
- Koni-Omega (press / rangefinder)
- Koni-Omegaflex M (twin-lens reflex)

==== 110 film ====
- Pocket 400: with Hexar-lenses (focus 28 mm) and exposure automatic, about 1975

==== Instant Camera ====
- KONICA Instant Press (1984-?)

=== Lenses ===
Konica lenses were named Hexanon or Hexar. Hexanon projector lenses are thought to have been used by the Japanese Camera Industry Institute for quality assurance tests on camera equipment of all brands, which may be a testament to the quality of Konica's optics. They are known to have made lenses in the Leica M, Konica F and Konica AR mounts: conventional primes ranging from 15 to 800mm, various zoom lenses and even two mirror lenses.

=== Digital cameras ===
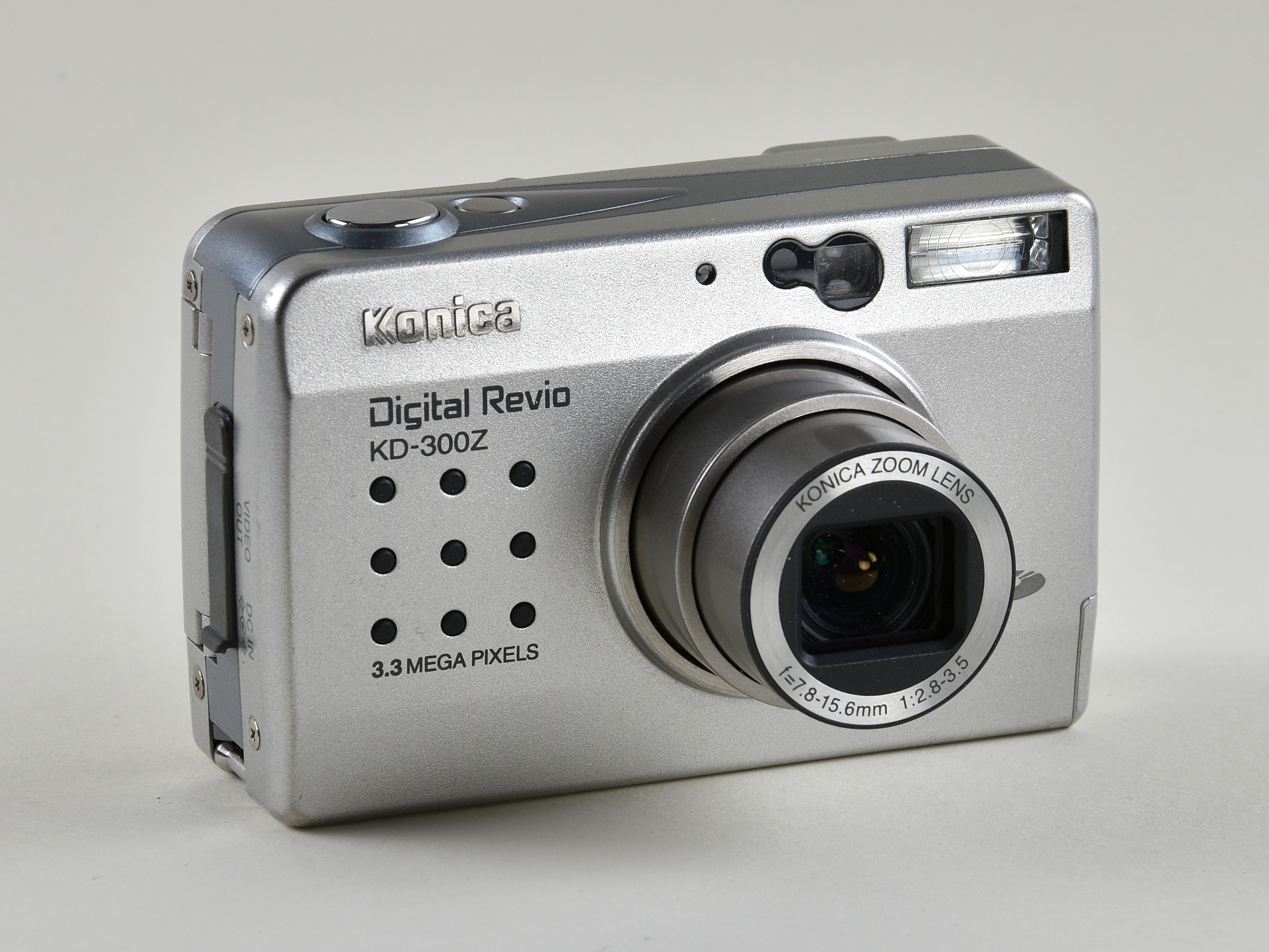
Konica Digital Revio KD-300Z (2001)

- Konica Q-M 100, 1997
- Konica DG-1, 1998, rubber case
- Konica DG-2, 2001, rubber case, 2 MP
- Konica Digital Revio KD-200Z, 2001
- Konica Digital Revio KD-300Z, 2001, 2x optical Zoom
- Konica Digital Revio KD-500Z, 2002, 3x optical Zoom, 5 MP
- Konica Revio C2, 2002, very compact, 1,2 MP
- Konica DG-3Z, 2003
- Konica Revio KD-410Z, 2003
- Konica Revio KD-420Z, 2003
- Konica Revio KD-510Z, 2003, 3x optical Zoom, 5 MP

== See also ==
- Fotomat - acquired by Konica in 1982.
- List of photographic equipment makers

== Works cited ==
- Konica Minolta (2004). Konica Minolta - History. Retrieved on November 6, 2005.
- Konica Minolta (2003). History of Konica. Retrieved on November 6, 2005.
- Buhl, Andreas (2005). Konica Start page. Extensive Konica SLR site. Retrieved on November 6, 2005.
