= Konica F =

Camera produced by Konishiroku

The Konica F was the first 35 mm single-lens reflex camera (SLR) produced by Konishiroku, released in February 1960. A prototype was shown as the Koniflex at the International Trade Fair in 1959.

== History ==
A year prior to the Konica F's introduction, a prototype of that camera was displayed at a photo show in Japan. At that time it was called the KonicaFlex. The only difference between the two was the mounting of the selenium light meter: While the Konica F meter was built into the front of the prism housing, that of the KonicaFlex was a flip-up type meter carried over from the Konica IIIM rangefinder of 1957.

Konishiroku had very limited means of distribution for the new camera outside Japan. They were mostly sold by special order and through catalogs. Between 600 and 1500 total Konica Fs were produced, making it a rare and collectible camera.

A few years later, the company's 35 mm rangefinder cameras were sold under the Wards brand in the United States. Montgomery Ward was a major catalog seller of photographic equipment at that time, and many Konica items appeared in their catalogs during the late 1950s and early 1960s. The small number of Konica Fs on store shelves resulted in the model being largely unnoticed, with the Canonflex R2000 considered by many to be the first 35 mm SLR to achieve 1/2000 shutter speed, despite the Konica F preceding it by eight months.

=== Additional Konica F-series cameras ===
The Konica F was followed by several cameras using the same F-mount, consisting of the FS (1962), FSW (1962), FP (1963), and FM (1965), before Konica released the Auto-Reflex (1965), which featured shutter-priority autoexposure but used the mechanically incompatible AR lens mount. In the early 1980s, Konica released cameras with similar names, including the Konica FS-1 and FP-1, but these use the AR bayonet mount and are not a continuation of the original F-series cameras.

Konica F-series cameras
| Model | Image | Intro. | Meter | Shutter (sec) | Size (W×H×D) (Note: With 52 mm f/1.4 Hexanon lens) | Weight | Notes |
|---|---|---|---|---|---|---|---|
| F | | 1960 | In-body selenium cell, coupled | B+1–1/2000, 1/125 sync | 150.5×105.5×91 mm (5.9×4.2×3.6 in) | 1,100 g (39 oz) | |
| FS | | 1962 | None | B+1–1/1000, 1/125 sync | 145×102.5×80 mm (5.7×4.0×3.1 in) | 940 g (33 oz) | |
| FSW | | 1962 | None | B+1–1/1000, 1/125 sync | ? | ? | FS with data back |
| FP | | 1963 | None | B+1–1/1000, 1/125 sync | 145×102.5×85.5 mm (5.7×4.0×3.4 in) | 1,050 g (37 oz) | Also sold as Revue SR (Europe) and SLR700 (Montgomery Ward) |
| FM | | 1965 | In-body CdS, uncoupled | B+1–1/1000, 1/125 sync | 145×102.5×85.5 mm (5.7×4.0×3.4 in) | 1,097 g (38.7 oz) | |

== Design features ==
=== Meter ===
The Konica F is equipped with an integrated, coupled light metering system which allowed the photographer to set the correct exposure directly by manipulating the film speed, shutter speed, and aperture controls. The meter uses a large selenium cell panel on the front of the viewfinder pentaprism housing to detect light levels. This type of sensor cell generates its own small electric current, so the metering system does not require a battery. On the other hand, selenium cells are known to degrade over time, losing accuracy or eventually failing. Many contemporary cameras and handheld meters also used selenium cells, but they were gradually replaced by CdS and other types of cells which require a battery and provide better long-term reliability.

=== Shutter ===
The Konica F used a new, highly reliable, vertically running, metal bladed shutter designed and manufactured by Konishiroku, which they branded the Hi Synchro (also High Synchro). This predated the Copal Square which shared a similar vertically-running metal-bladed shutter design, descendants of which are almost universally used in film and digital SLRs in the 21st century. Many contemporary cameras (and many later ones) used horizontal running, cloth shutters and older designs that were less durable.

The Konishiroku shutter featured a fastest shutter speed of 1/2000 sec. This was the highest shutter speed attained to date in a 35 mm SLR camera. Typical cameras of the time commonly used 1/250 or 1/500 s as maximum speeds, and other premium models used 1/1000 s. Several months after the Konica F, in late 1960, Canon released the Canonflex R2000, the second model to achieve 1/2000 s shutter speed, but it still used the older, horizontally running, cloth shutter design. No subsequent Konica 35 mm SLR camera ever featured faster than 1/1000 s shutter speed. Most used the Copal Square variant of the shutter and many had 1/125 s flash sync. There was even a Copal Square "Hi Synchro" used in the Konica T3 in the mid-1970s, known for its reliability.

The Konica F also featured a 1/125 s flash sync, whereas other cameras of the time offered 1/30 to 1/60 s sync.

=== Viewfinder ===
The pentaprism was removable and could be replaced with an optional waist level finder. The focusing screen of the F has multiple focus aids: a Fresnel focused light on a matte area, a diaprism, and a split image center spot. This wealth of focus was unusual for cameras in 1960 and wasn't standard on another Konica until the mid-1970s.

== Konica F-mount lenses ==
There were four lenses branded Hexanon offered along with the F:

- The normal lens was a 52 mm f/1.4 double Gauss with a 49 mm filter thread (a similar lens was offered later with a 55 mm thread).
- A retrofocus wide-angle, 35 mm f/2.0,
- Telephoto 85 mm f/1.8 and 135 mm f/2.8 lenses were also offered.

Lenses for the Konica F are known as Konica F-mount (a.k.a. "Mount I" or "Old Bayonet", not to be confused with the Nikon F-mount), distinguishing them from the mechanically incompatible Konica AR-mount (a.k.a. "Mount II" or "New Bayonet") introduced in 1965 with the Konica Autoreflex line. Within the F-mount, there were two sub-versions, one which coupled to the built-in meter of the Konica F, and another, which were not coupled, as the FS, FSW, FP, and FM successors to the F did not have a coupled light meter.

The 35, 52 and 85 mm all had a linkage that juts out from the side of the lens which inter-connects with a lever on the front of the camera to register the lens' aperture setting with the camera's metering system. Because of this linkage interface, lenses sold with later Konica early mount cameras are not easily fitted onto the F, and vice versa, although they all share the same bayonet mount. In 1965, Konica introduced the Auto-Reflex line of cameras and lenses, which do not share the same bayonet mount as the F and its immediate successors, up to 1964's FM model.

The 135 mm Hexanon for the F uses a manual aperture, but the other lenses featured a "fully automatic" aperture, which means the aperture diaphragm is held fully open when mounted on the camera body except when exposing the film. Because the diaphragm is open during focusing, this makes the viewfinder brighter and renders a shallow depth of field, both of which help with focusing. Once the shutter release button is pressed, the reflex mirror cycles up out of the light path and the aperture is allowed to snap down to the pre-selected setting, then the shutter opens to expose the film. Further, after the exposure is completed and the shutter closes, the aperture re-opens automatically and the mirror cycles back down. Almost all of the later F-mount lenses aside from the longer telephoto lenses (focal length ≥ 200 mm) were available with automatic diaphragms.

Konica Hexanon F-mount lenses
| FL (mm) | Ap. | Coupled | Uncoupled | Angle | Ele / Grp | Min. focus | Filt (mm) | Wgt | Dia × Len | Notes |
|---|---|---|---|---|---|---|---|---|---|---|
Wide angle lenses
| 35 | f/2–16 | Yes | Yes | 63° | 8/7 | 0.3 m (12 in) | 72 | 360 g (13 oz) | ?×57 mm (2.2 in) | |
| 35 | f/2.8–16 | Yes | Yes | 63° | 6/5 | 0.3 m (12 in) | 55 | 240 g (8.5 oz) | ?×57 mm (2.2 in) | Preset diaphragm version available (uncoupled) |
Normal lenses
| 50 | f/2–16 | No | Yes | 46° | 6/5 | 0.6 m (24 in) | 55 | 185 g (6.5 oz) | ? | |
| 52 | f/1.4–16 | Yes | Yes | 45° | 7/5 | 0.6 m (24 in) | 55 (49) | 290 g (10 oz) | ?×41 mm (1.6 in) | |
| 52 | f/1.8–16 | No | Yes | 45° | 6/5 | 0.6 m (24 in) | 55 | 185 g (6.5 oz) | ?×36 mm (1.4 in) | |
Telephoto lenses
| 85 | f/1.8–16 | Yes | Yes | 28.5° | 6/5 | 1 m (39 in) | 55 | 400 g (14 oz) | ?×67 mm (2.6 in) | |
| 100 | f/2.8–22 | No | Yes | 24° | 5/4 | 1 m (39 in) | 55 | 350 g (12 oz) | ?×65 mm (2.6 in) | Preset diaphragm version available (uncoupled) |
| 135 | f/2.8–22 | Yes | Yes | 18° | 5/5 | 1.5 m (4.9 ft) | 55 | 445 g (15.7 oz) | ? | Manual diaphragm |
| 135 | f/3.5–22 | No | Yes | 18° | 4/4 | 1.5 m (4.9 ft) | 55 | 395–425 g (13.9–15.0 oz) | ?×92 mm (3.6 in) | Preset and automatic diaphragm versions available |
| 200 | f/3.5–22 | No | Yes | 12° | 5/5 | 2.5 m (8.2 ft) | 67 | 855 g (30.2 oz) | ?×156 mm (6.1 in) | Preset diaphragm |
| 400 | f/4.5–32 | No | Yes | 6° | 4/4 | 8 m (26 ft) | 55 rear | 2.4 kg (5.3 lb) | ?×353 mm (13.9 in) | Preset diaphragm |
| 800 | f/8–45 | No | Yes | 3° | 2/1 | 20 m (66 ft) | 55 rear | 5.6 kg (12 lb) | ?×775 mm (30.5 in) | Preset diaphragm |
