= Konica FP-1 =

35mm SLR camera

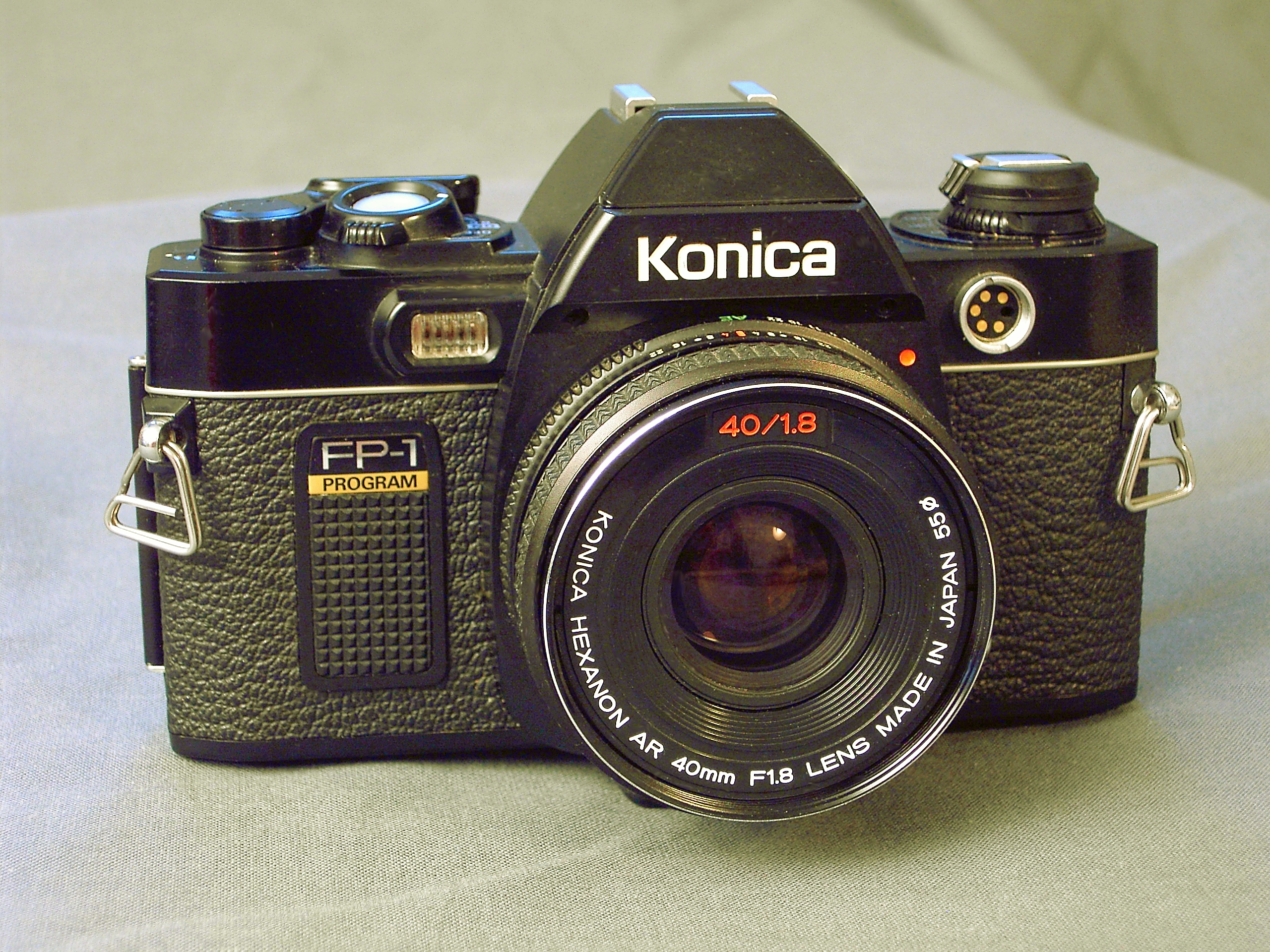
- The Konica FP-1 with AR 40mm f/1.8 lens

Overview
- Type: 35mm SLR

Lens
- Lens mount: Konica AR-mount

Focusing
- Focus: Manual

Exposure/metering
- Exposure: Programmed AE

Flash
- Flash: Hot shoe

General
- Battery: 4LR44 or equivalent 6V battery
- Dimensions: 140×89×45 mm (5.5×3.5×1.8 in), 495 g (1.091 lb)
- Made in: Japan

The Konica FP-1, introduced in 1981 and discontinued in 1983, was a 35mm SLR camera with TTL metering and a large range of exchangeable optics.

The camera was quite unusual: shutter speed and aperture was automatically set by the camera (AE mode), with no user interaction possible. This reduced the user's workload to focusing, releasing the shutter and winding the film. Film winding could be further simplified by attaching an "Auto-Winder F" to the camera house.

Most SLR cameras would at this time be fully manual, with an option of using one or more automatic exposure modes. The FP-1 was basically a point-and-shoot camera, like most viewfinder cameras, but with the benefit of TTL metering and exchangeable lenses. A similar camera, for the same entry-level user group, is the later Canon T-50.

The AE mode itself was unusual. The camera operated with only 3 possible apertures, f/2.8, f/5.6 or f/11, and would use shutter speeds from 1/30 to 1/1000 sec. in 1/3 light value steps. A f/1.8 lens would have full light strength in the viewfinder, but at exposure the max. aperture would be f/2.8. An e.g. f/3.5 lens would use f/5.6 as the max aperture during exposure.

The only exposure control the user could exercise was to 'cheat' the camera by deliberately mis-setting the film speed.

Like the Konica FC-1 the FP-1 has the Autoload film loading system: The camera takes the film tip automatically and there is no need to fire the shutter until the first frame is reached. It is possible to use a separate winder, the "Auto Winder F".

The camera handles and performs well, but suffers from a very loud shutter/mirror operation. The battery control can be cheated: with a lithium battery, the battery control lamp can indicate 'OK', but not have enough energy to release the shutter. The camera has a sturdy feel, except for the very flimsy battery compartment cover. Without a winder attached, large amounts of dust can enter the camera through the winder socket.

== Lenses ==
Lenses are fixed with the Konica AR-mount. With some third-part optics – some authors specifically name Tamron's Adaptall-II – prolonged use can cause excessive wear on the shutter mechanism.

Konica offered interchangeable lenses with focus from 15 mm up to 2,000 mm. All lenses by Konica are named Hexanon. They have a good quality and got a good reputation, mechanics and less variation between samples included.

This model was commonly paired with a Konica 40mm Hexanon AR F1.8 lens. The weight of this pancake lens, which has six lenses, is 140 g only. It got an excellent reputation.
