= Back (disambiguation) =

The back is the area of the human body from the top of the buttocks to the back of the neck and shoulders.

Back or backing may also refer to:

== People ==
- Back (surname)

== Places ==
- Back (crater), on the Moon
- Back, Lewis, a village on the Isle of Lewis, Scotland
- Back Bay (disambiguation), any of several places
- Back Peninsula, Nunavut, Canada
- Back railway station, in Back, Manitoba, Canada
- The Backs, an area at the rear of several colleges in Cambridge, England

== Arts, entertainment, and media ==
=== Music ===
- Back (Lynn Anderson album), 1983
- Back (Ohio Players album), 1988
- "Back" (song), 2012, by Colt Ford
- B.A.C.K., a 1999 album by Danish thrash metal band Artillery
- "Back", a song by Lil Pump from the 2017 album Lil Pump
- Backing, musical accompaniment

=== Other uses in arts, entertainment, and media ===
- Back (novel), 1946, by Henry Green
- Back (TV series), a 2017 British sitcom
- "Back" (Louie), a television episode
- "Back" (Spaced), a television episode

== Sports ==
- Back (American football), any of several player positions
- Back (Canadian football), any of several player positions
- Back, or defender, a position in association football and Australian rules football
- Back (rugby league)
- Back (rugby union)

== Other uses ==
- Bauk (field) (alternatively spelled "back"), a Scottish agricultural term
- Back (horse), where the saddle goes
- Camera back, a digital adapter for a film camera
- Backing (gambling), betting that an outcome will occur

== See also ==
- Back nine, the last nine holes on a golf course
- Back vowel, vowels articulated toward the back of the oral cavity
- Backing (sound change), a process resulting in sounds being articulated further back in the vocal tract
- Backrest (disambiguation)
