= View camera =

Large-format camera

Basic view camera terminology

A view camera is a large-format camera. View cameras were originally analog cameras in which the lens forms an inverted image on a ground-glass screen directly at the film plane. The image is viewed, composed, and focused, then the glass screen is replaced with the film to expose exactly the same image seen on the screen. In 2019, digital view cameras became available (see § Digital).

This type of camera was developed during the era of the daguerreotype (1840s–1850s) and is still in use, some using drive mechanisms for movement (rather than loosen-move-tighten), more scale markings, and/or more spirit levels. It comprises a flexible bellows that forms a light-tight seal between two adjustable standards, one of which holds a lens, and the other a ground glass or a photographic film holder or a digital back. There are three general types: the rail camera, the field camera, and those that don't fit into the other categories.

The bellows is a flexible, accordion-pleated box. It encloses the space between the lens and film, and flexes to accommodate the movements of the standards. The front standard is a frame that holds the lensboard, to which the lens (perhaps with shutter) is attached.

At the other end of the bellows, the rear standard is a frame that holds a ground glass plate, used for focusing and composing the image before exposure—and is replaced by a holder containing the light-sensitive film, plate, or image sensor for exposure. The front and rear standards can move relative to each other, unlike most other camera types. Whereas most cameras control only the distance of the plane of focus from the camera, the view camera can also adjust the orientation of the plane of focus, and perspective control. The camera is normally used on a tripod support.

== Types ==
Several types of view cameras are used for different purposes, and provide different degrees of movement and portability. They include:

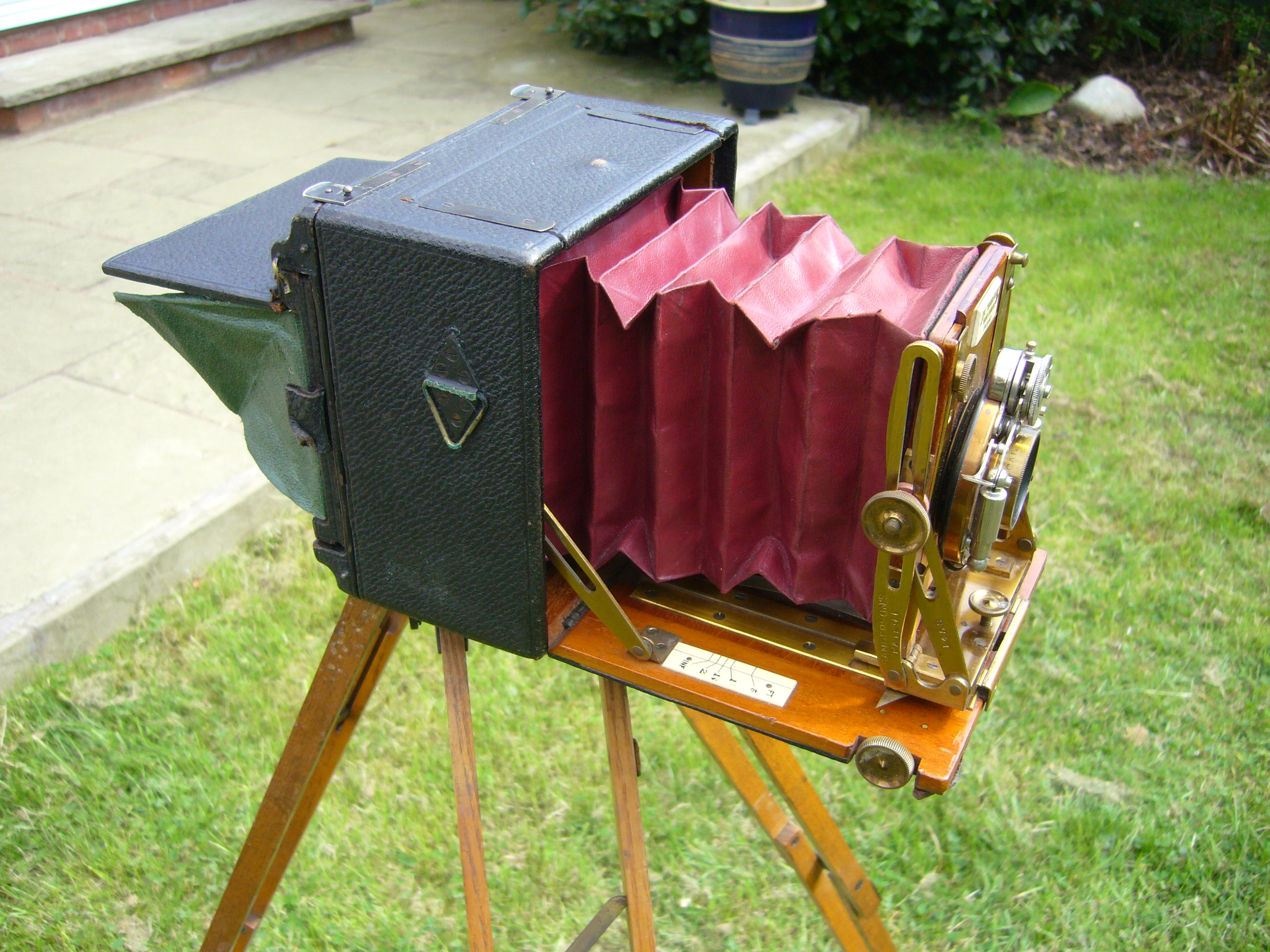
A Sanderson 'Hand' camera dating from circa 1899

- Rail camera – There are the smaller more maneuverable monorail camera and the large stable immovable multi-rail camera known as the process camera.
  - The monorail camera is the most common type of studio view camera, with front and rear standards mounted to a single rail that is fixed to a camera support. This design gives the greatest range of movements and flexibility, with both front and rear standards able to tilt, shift, rise, fall, and swing in similar proportion. These are generally made of metal with leather or synthetic bellows, and are difficult to pack for travel. Sinar and Toyo are popular manufacturers of monorail view camera systems. ARCA-Swiss produces monorail cameras for field use in addition to models for the more conventional studio applications. Many manufacturers also offer monorail extensions that move the front or rear standards farther away from each other to facilitate focusing on close objects (macrophotography).
  - The stationary process camera is used for copying nearly flat artwork that is held to a copyboard located at the far end of the camera rails of horizontally mounted cameras, or at the base of vertical cameras. The work to be copied and the film are often held in place by vacuum and copying is usually at 1:1 magnification. They use various sizes of film depending upon what is needed for the specific job.
- Field camera – These have the front and rear standard mounted on sliding rails fixed to a hinged flat bed that can be attached to a camera support, such as a tripod. These cameras are usually made of wood, or sometimes lightweight and strong composites such as carbon fiber. With the bellows fully retracted, the flat bed folds up, reducing the camera to a relatively small, light, and portable box. The trade off for this portability is that the standards are not as mobile or as adjustable as on a monorail design. The rear standard in particular may be fixed and offer no movement. These large format but transportable cameras are popular with landscape photographers. Tachihara and Wisner are examples of modern field cameras at opposite ends of the price scale.
  - Extremely large field cameras use 11×14 film and larger, or panoramic film sizes such as 4×10 or 8×20. These are sometimes called banquet cameras, and once were commonly used to photograph large, posed groups of people to mark occasions, such as banquets or weddings.
  - Studio and salon cameras are similar to field cameras, but do not fold up for portability.
  - Folding plate cameras with limited movements were often used. An example is the Goerz Taro-Tenax 9x12cm.
  - Press cameras that have a ground glass integral to the film-holder mechanism allow critical focus and use of available movements. More expensive examples had a wide array of movements, as well as focusing and composing aids like rangefinders and viewfinders. They are most often made of metal, designed to fold up quickly for portability, used by press photographers before and during the second world war. Some press cameras have more adjustment capabilities, including some ability to tilt the rear standard, and can be either hand-held or attached to a tripod for support.
- Other view cameras – Many unique view cameras have been built and used for special purposes or for general purpose.

View cameras use large format sheet film—one sheet per photograph. Standard sizes in inches are: 4×5, 5×7, 4×10, 5×12, 8×10, 11×14, 7×17, 8×20, 12×20, 20×24, and larger for process cameras. (It is usual to list the short side first in the Americas, and the long side in many other countries, thus 4×5 is the same as 5×4). A similar, but not identical, range of metric sizes is used in many countries; thus 9×12 cm is similar to, but not interchangeable with, 4×5 inches and 13×18 cm is similar to, but not interchangeable with, 5×7 inches. The most widely used format is 4×5, followed by 8×10.

A few rollfilm cameras have movements that make them as versatile as a sheet film view camera. Rollfilm and instant film backs are available to use in place of a sheetfilm holder on a single-film camera.

== Movements ==
Photographers use view cameras to control focus and convergence of parallel lines. Image control is done by moving the front and/or rear standards. Movements are the ways the front and rear standards can move to alter perspective and focus. The term can also refer to the mechanisms on the standards that control their position.

Not all cameras have all movements available to both front and rear standards, and some cameras have more movements available than others. Some cameras have mechanisms that facilitate intricate movement combinations.

Some limited view camera–type movements are possible with SLR, DSLR, and MILC cameras using various tilt/shift lenses. Also, as use of view cameras declines in favor of digital photography, these movements are simulated using computer software.

=== Rise and fall ===
Rise and fall are the movements of either the front or rear standard vertically along a line in a plane parallel to the film (or sensor) plane. Rise is a very important movement especially in architectural photography. Generally, the lens is moved vertically—either up or down—along the lens plane to change the portion of the image captured on the film. In the 35 mm format, special shift lenses (sometimes called perspective control lenses) emulate the rise or fall of view cameras.

The main effect of rise is to eliminate converging parallels when photographing tall buildings. If a camera without movements is pointed at a tall building, the top is off. If the camera is tilted upwards to get it all in, the film plane is not parallel to the building, and the building seems narrower at the top than the bottom: lines that are parallel in the object converge in the image.

To avoid this apparent distortion, a wide-angle lens gets more of the building in, but includes more of the foreground and alters the perspective. A camera with rising front lets a normal lens be raised to include the top of the building without tilting the camera.

This requires that the image circle of the lens be larger than is required to cover the film without use of movements. If the lens can produce a circular image just large enough to cover the film, it can't cover the bottom of the film as it rises. Consequently, lens coverage must be larger to accommodate rise (and fall, tilt and shift).

In Figure a) below (images are upside down, as a photographer would see them on the ground glass of a view camera), the lens has been shifted down (fall). Notice that much of the unwanted foreground is included, but not the top of the tower. In Figure b), the lens has been shifted up (rise): the top of the tower is now inside the area captured on film, at the sacrifice of unwanted green foreground.

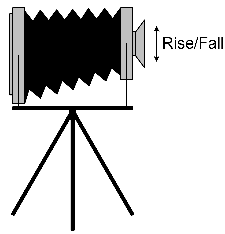
Front standard rise

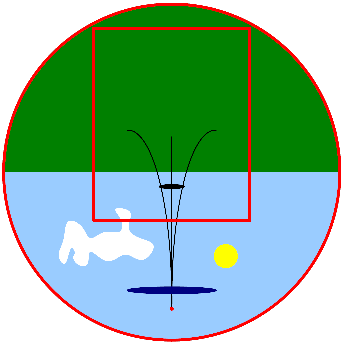
Figure a) Fall

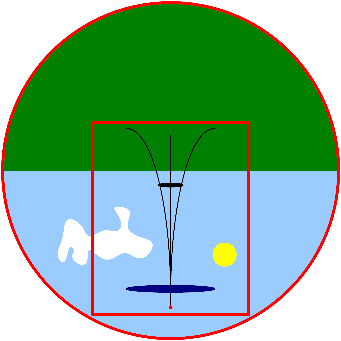
Figure b) Rise

=== Shift ===
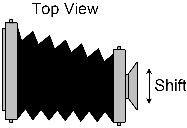
Front standard shift

Moving the front standard left or right from its normal position is called lens shift, or simply shift. This movement is similar to rise and fall, but moves the image horizontally rather than vertically. One use for shift is to remove the image of the camera from the final image when photographing a reflective surface.

=== Tilt ===
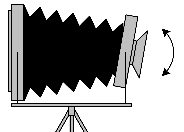
Front standard tilt

The axis of the lens is normally perpendicular to the film (or sensor). Changing the angle between axis and film by tilting the lens standard backwards or forwards is called lens tilt, or just tilt. Tilt is especially useful in landscape photography. By using the Scheimpflug principle, the “plane of sharp focus” can be changed so that any plane can be brought into sharp focus. When the film plane and lens plane are parallel as is the case for most 35 mm cameras, the plane of sharp focus is also parallel to these two planes. If, however, the lens plane is tilted with respect to the film plane, the plane of sharp focus is also tilted according to geometrical and optical properties. The three planes intersect in a line below the camera for downward lens tilt. The tilted plane of sharp focus is useful, in that this plane can be made to coincide with a near and far object. Thus, both near and far objects on the plane are in focus.

This effect is often incorrectly thought of as increasing the depth of field. Depth of field depends on the focal length, aperture, and subject distance. As long as the photographer wants sharpness in a plane that is parallel to the film, tilt is of no use. However, tilt has a strong effect on the depth of field by drastically altering its shape, making it asymmetrical. Without tilt, the limits of near and far acceptable focus are parallel to the plane of sharp focus as well as parallel to the film. With forward tilt, the plane of sharp focus tilts even more and the near and far limits of acceptable focus form a wedge shape (viewed from the side). Thus, the lens still sees a cone shaped portion of whatever is in front of it while the wedge of acceptable focus is now more closely aligned with this cone. Therefore, depending on the shape of the subject, a wider aperture can be used, lessening concerns about camera stability due to slow shutter speed and diffraction due to too-small aperture.

Tilting achieves the desired depth of field using the aperture at which the lens performs best. Too small an aperture risks losses to diffraction and camera/subject motion what is gained from depth of field. Only testing a given scene, or experience, shows whether tilting is better than leaving the standards neutral and relying on the aperture alone to achieve the desired depth of field. If the scene is sharp enough at f/32 with 2 degrees of tilt but would need f/64 with zero tilt, then tilt is the solution. If another scene would need f/45 with or without tilt, then nothing is gained. See Merklinger and Luong for extensive discussions on determining the optimal tilt (if any) in challenging situations.

With a forward tilt, the shape of the portion of a scene in acceptable focus is a wedge. Thus, the scene most likely to benefit from tilting is short in the front and expands to a greater height or thickness toward the horizon. A scene consisting of tall trees in the near, middle and far distance may not lend itself to tilting unless the photographer is willing to sacrifice either the top of the near trees and/or the bottom of the far trees.

Assuming lens axis front tilt, here are the trade offs in choosing between a small degree of tilt (say less than 3) and a larger tilt: A small tilt causes a wider or fatter wedge but one that is far off axis from the cone of light seen by the lens. Conversely, a large tilt (say 10 degrees) makes the wedge more aligned with the lens view, but with a narrower wedge. Thus, a modest tilt is often, or even usually, the best starting point. Small and medium format cameras have fixed bodies that do not allow for misalignment of the film and lens planes, intentionally or not. Tilt/shift (“TS”) or perspective control (“PC”) lenses that provide limited movements for these cameras can be purchased from a number of lens makers. High-quality TS or PC lenses are expensive. The price of a new Canon TS-E or Nikon PC-E lens is comparable to that of a good used large-format camera, which offers a much greater range of adjustment.

=== Swing ===
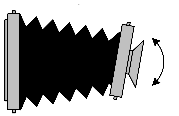
Front standard swing (top view)

Altering the angle of the lens standard in relation to the film plane by swiveling it from side to side is called swing. Swing is like tilt, but it changes the angle of the focal plane in the horizontal axis instead of the vertical axis. For example, swing can help achieve sharp focus along the entire length of a picket fence that is not parallel to the film plane.

=== Back tilt/swing ===
Angular movements of the rear standard change the angle between the lens plane and the film plane just as front standard angular movements do. Though rear standard tilt changes the plane of sharp focus in the same manner as front standard tilt, this is not usually the reason to use rear tilt/swing. When a lens is a certain distance (its focal length) away from the film, distant objects, such as faraway mountains, are in focus. Moving the lens farther from the film brings closer objects into focus. Tilting or swinging the film plane puts one side of the film farther from the lens than the center is and the opposite point of the film is therefore closer to the lens.

One reason to swing or tilt the rear standard is to keep the film plane parallel to the face of the subject. Another reason to swing or tilt the rear standard is to control apparent convergence of lines when shooting subjects at an angle.

It is often incorrectly stated that rear movements can be used to change perspective. The only thing that truly controls perspective is the location of the camera in relation to the objects in the frame. Rear movements can let a photographer shoot a subject from a perspective that puts the camera at an angle to the subject, yet still achieves parallel lines. Thus, rear movements allow a change of perspective by allowing a different camera location, yet no view camera movement actually alters perspective.

== Lenses ==
A view camera lens typically consists of:

- A front lens element— sometimes referred to as a cell.
- A shutter—an electronic or spring-actuated mechanism that controls exposure duration. Some early shutters were air-actuated. For long exposures, a lens with no shutter (a barrel lens) can be uncovered for the duration of the exposure by removing a lens cap.
- The aperture diaphragm
- A lensboard—a flat board, typically square in shape and made of metal or wood, that locks securely into the front standard of a particular view camera, with a central hole of the right size to insert a lens and shutter assembly, usually secured and made light-tight by screwing a ring onto a thread on the rear of the lens assembly. Lensboards, complete with lenses, can be removed and fitted quickly.
- A rear lens element (or cell).

Almost any lens of the appropriate coverage area may be used with almost any view camera. All that is required is that the lens be mounted on a lensboard compatible with the camera. Not all lensboards work with all models of view camera, though different cameras may be designed to work with a common lensboard type. Lensboards usually come with a hole sized according to the shutter size, often called the Copal Number. Copal is the most popular maker of leaf shutters for view camera lenses.

The lens is designed to split into two pieces, the front and rear elements screwed, usually by a trained technician, into the front and back of the shutter assembly, and the whole fitted in a lensboard.

View camera lenses are designed with both focal length and coverage in mind. A 300 mm lens may give a different angle of view (either over 31° or over 57°), depending on whether it was designed to cover a 4×5 or 8×10 image area. Most lenses are designed to cover more than just the image area to accommodate camera movements.

Focusing involves moving the entire front standard with the lens assembly closer to or further away from the rear standard, unlike many lenses on smaller cameras in which one group of lens elements is fixed and another moves.

Very long focus lenses may require that the camera be fitted with special extra-long rails and bellows. Very short focal length wide-angle lenses may require that the standards be closer together than a normal concertina-folded bellows allows. Such a situation requires a bag bellows, a simple light-tight flexible bag. Recessed lensboards are also sometimes used to get the rear element of a wide angle lens close enough to the film plane; they may also be of use with telephoto lenses, since these compressed long-focus lenses may also have very small spacing between the back of the lens and the film plane.

Zoom lenses are not used in view camera photography, as there is no need for rapid and continuous change of focal length with static subjects, and the price, size, weight, and complexity would be excessive. Some lenses are "convertible": the front or rear element only, or both elements, may be used, giving three different focal lengths, though the quality of the single elements is not as good at larger apertures as the combination. These are popular with field photographers who can save weight by carrying one convertible lens rather than two or three lenses of different focal lengths.

Soft focus lenses introduce spherical aberration deliberately into the optical formula for an ethereal effect considered pleasing, and flattering to subjects with less than perfect complexions. The degree of soft-focus effect is determined by either aperture size or special disks that fit into the lens to modify the aperture shape. Some antique lenses, and some modern SLR soft focus lenses, provide a lever that controls the softening effect by altering the optical formula.

== Film ==
View cameras use sheet film but can use roll film (generally 120/220 size) by using special roll film holders. Popular "normal" image formats for the 4×5 camera are 6×6, 6×7, and 6×9 cm. 6×12 and 6×17 cm are suited to panoramic photography.

With an inexpensive modification of the darkslide, and no modification to the camera, half a sheet of film can be exposed at a time. While this technique could be used for economy where a larger image is not required, it is almost always used with the intention of obtaining a panoramic format so that, for example, a 4×5 camera can take two 2×5 photos, an 8×10 can take two 4×10s etc. This is popular for landscape photography, and in the past was common for group photographs (hence, half-frame panorama formats such as 4x10 are commonly referred to as "Banquet formats")

== Digital ==
Digital camera backs are available for view cameras to create digital images instead of using film. Prices are high compared to smaller digital cameras.

Digital scan backs gradually move a linear array of sensors across the viewing field, pausing periodically to capture a linear slice of the viewing field, until the entire viewing field has been captured. This process typically takes several minutes, making it suitable for non-moving views (such as buildings or parked cars) but unsuitable for fast-moving views (such as athletes engaged in sporting events). Afterward, the resulting thousands of linear slices are stitched together in order to form a complete image. Due to the large file sizes and the large numbers of files created, the digital scan back is normally tethered to a computer in order to continuously transfer these files while the viewing field is being captured.

The pixel count (spatial resolution) of a 35mm film image is only 20 megapixels. A medium format film image ranges from 80MP to 125MP. In large format film images, a 4" x 5" film corresponds to 300MP, a 8" x 10" film corresponds to 1,200MP, and a 20" × 24" film corresponds to 7,200MP.

According to scientist and photographer Roger N. Clark, the theoretical maximum resolution of the human eye (assuming 20/20 vision) is 576MP if assuming only a 120 degree field of view. This corresponds to a display resolution of 32K. However, the human eye's actual field of view is about 180 degrees. Per Clark's formula, the human eye's actual maximum resolution therefore equals 180 * 180 * 60 * 60 / (0.3 * 0.3), which is 1,296MP.

Image stitching can be used with medium format digital cameras to create large format images, but as with digital scan backs this process is better suited to non-moving views than to fast-moving views. For fast-moving views, a full-frame mirrorless interchangeable-lens camera such as the 45MP Canon EOS R5 Mark II (MSRP $4,299 without lens, 12-30 fps continuous shooting, 8K video at 60p) might be useful.

In 2019, Phase One launched its IQ4 series of digital camera backs at 100MP to 150MP resolution (included with both the Phase One XF IQ4 150MP Camera (MSRP $51,990 without lens, 1 fps, DSLR) and the Phase One XT IQ4 150MP Camera (MSRP $56,990 without lens, 1 fps, mirrorless)), with the 150MP generating 120.26 x 90.19 cm (47.35" x 35.5") 16-bit color images at 300dpi.

In 2025, a variety of lower-cost medium format digital cameras were available in the 50 to 100MP resolution range. Available 100MP cameras included the FujiFilm GFX 100 II (MSRP $7,499 without lens, 8K video at 30p/4K video at 60p), the FujiFilm GFX 100S (MSRP $5,999 without lens, 4K video at 30p), the FujiFilm GFX 100S II (MSRP $4,999 without lens, 8 fps with autofocus, 4K video at 30p) and the Hasselblad X2D II 100C (MSRP $7,399 including a XCD 75mm f/3.4 lens; no video capability).

== Operation ==
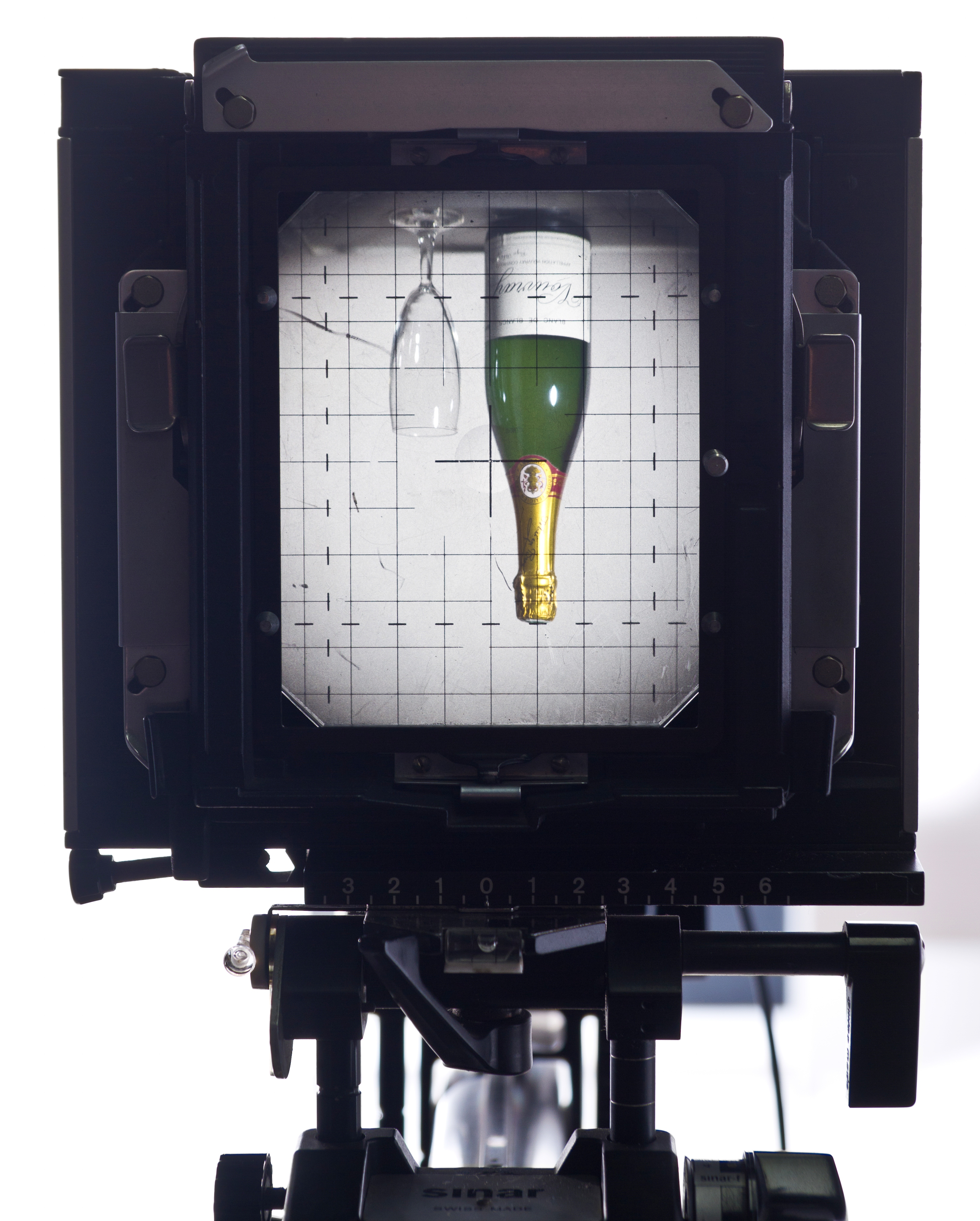
Viewing through a Sinar F camera

The camera must be set up in a suitable position. In some cases the subject can also be manipulated, as in a studio. In others the camera must be positioned to photograph subjects such as landscapes. The camera must be mounted in a way that prevents camera motion for the duration of the exposure. Usually a tripod is used—a camera with a long bellows extension may require two.

To operate the view camera, the photographer opens the shutter on the lens to focus and compose the image on a ground glass plate on the rear standard. The rear standard holds the ground glass in the same plane that the film later occupies—so that an image focused on the ground glass is focused on the film. The ground glass image can be somewhat dim and difficult to view in bright light. Photographers often use a focusing cloth or "dark cloth" over their heads and the rear of the camera. The dark cloth shrouds the viewing area and keeps environmental light from obscuring the image. In the dark space created by the dark cloth, the image appears as bright as it can, so the photographer can view, focus, and compose the image.

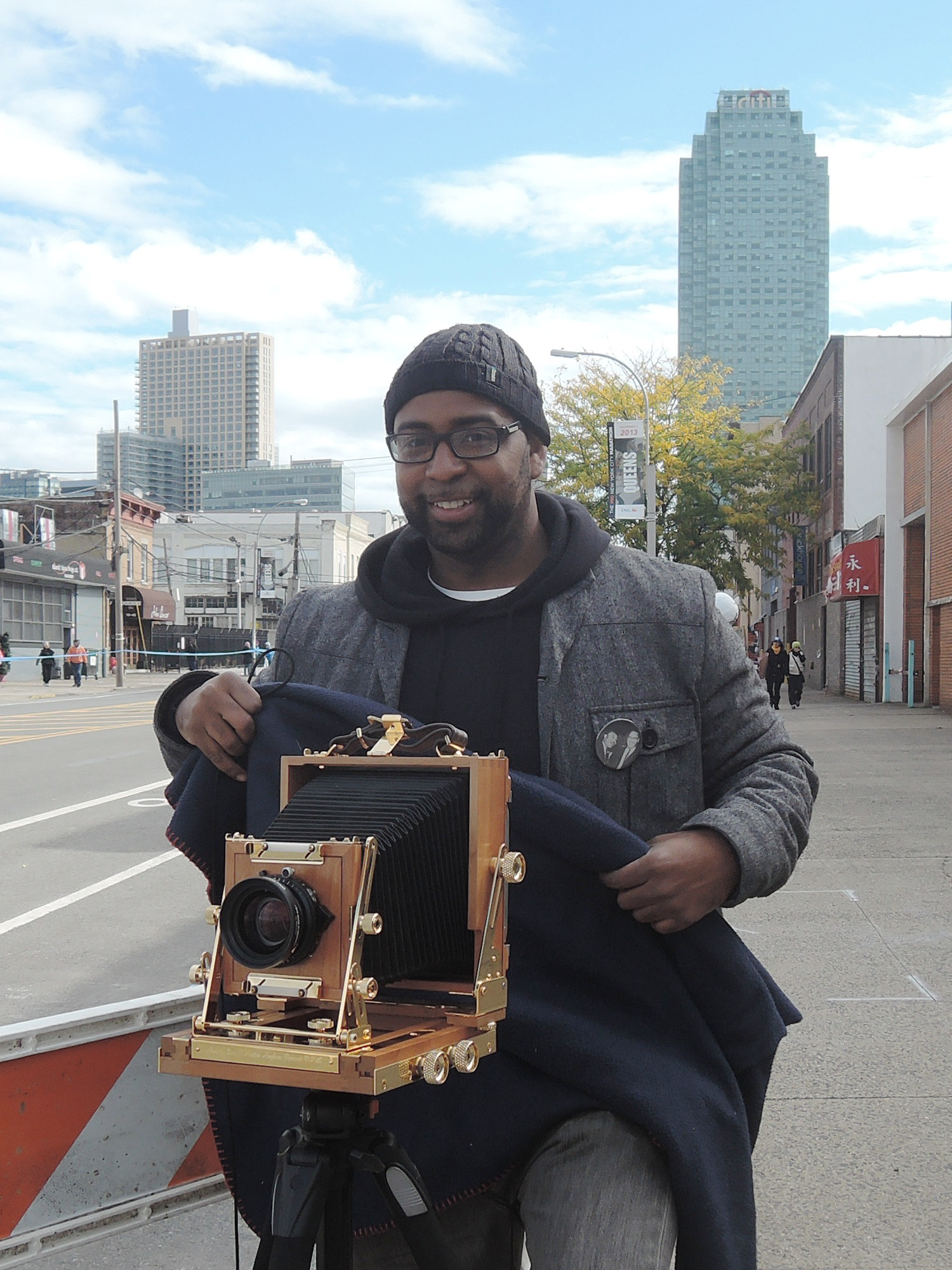

Often, a photographer uses a magnifying lens, usually a high quality loupe, to critically focus the image. An addition over the ground glass called a Fresnel lens can considerably brighten the ground glass image (with a slight loss of focusing accuracy). The taking lens may be stopped down to help gauge depth of field effects and vignetting, but the photographer generally opens the lens to its widest setting for focusing.

The ground glass and frame assembly, known as the spring back, is held in place by springs that pull and hold the ground glass firmly into the plane of focus during the focusing and composition process. Once focusing is complete, the same springs act as a flexible clamping mechanism to press the film holder into the same plane of focus that the ground glass occupied.

To take the photograph, the photographer pulls back the ground glass and slides the film holder into its place. The shutter is then closed and cocked, the shutter speed and aperture set. The photographer removes the darkslide that covers the sheet of film in the film holder, and triggers the shutter to make the exposure. Finally, the photographer replaces the darkslide and removes the film holder with the exposed film.

Sheet film holders are generally interchangeable between various brands and models of view cameras, adhering to de facto standards. The largest cameras and more uncommon formats are less standardized.

Special film holders and accessories can fit in place of standard film holders for specific purposes. A Grafmatic, for example, can fit six sheets of film in the space of an ordinary two-sheet holder, and some light meters have an attachment that inserts into the film holder slot on the camera back so the photographer can measure light that falls at a specific point on the film plane. The entire film holder/back assembly is often an industry standard Graflex back, removable so accessories like roll-film holders and digital imagers can be used without altering focus.

== Pros and cons compared to medium and 35mm formats ==
=== Advantages ===
- The ability to skew the plane of critical focus: In a camera without movements the film plane is always parallel to the lens plane. A camera with tilts and swings lets the photographer skew the plane of focus away from the parallel in any direction, which in many cases can bring the image of a subject that is not parallel to the lens plane into near-to-far focus without stopping down the aperture excessively. Both standards can be tilted through the horizontal or swung through the vertical axes to change the plane of focus. Tilts and swings of the front standard alone do not alter or distort shapes or converging lines in the image; tilts and swings of the rear standard do affect these things, as well as the plane of focus: if the plane of focus must be skewed without altering shapes in the image, front movements alone must be used. The Scheimpflug principle explains the relationship between lens tilts and swings, and the plane of sharp focus.
- The ability to distort the shape of the image by skewing the film plane: This is most often to reduce or eliminate, or deliberately exaggerate, convergence of lines that are parallel in the subject. If a camera with parallel film and lens planes is pointed at an angle to a plane subject with parallel lines, the lines appear to converge in the image, becoming closer to each other the further away from the camera they are. With a view camera the rear standard can be swung toward the wall to reduce this convergence. If the standard is parallel to the wall, convergence is eliminated. Moving the rear standard this way skews the plane of focus, which can be corrected with a front swing in the same direction as the rear swing.
- Improved image quality for a print of a given size: The larger a piece of film is, the less detail is lost at a given print size because the larger film requires less enlargement for the same size print. In other words, the same scene photographed on a large-format camera provides a better-quality image and allows greater enlargement than the same image in a smaller format. Additionally, the larger a piece of film is, the more subtle and varied the tonal palette and gradations are at a given print size. A large film size also allows same-size contact printing.
- Control of development: because a view camera only holds a single frame of film, each image can be developed optimally according to subject matter and printing considerations.
- Shallow depth of field: view cameras require longer focal length lenses than smaller format cameras, especially for the larger sizes, with shallower depth of field, letting the photographer focus solely on the subject.
- Smaller apertures can be used: much smaller apertures can be used than with smaller format cameras before diffraction becomes significant for a given print size.
- Low resale value is an advantage for buyers, but not for sellers. A top-of-the-line 8×10 camera that cost $8,000 new can often be bought in excellent condition, with additional accessories, for $1,500.

=== Disadvantages ===
- Lack of automation: most view cameras are fully manual, requiring time, and allowing even experienced photographers to make mistakes. Some cameras, such as Sinars, have some degree of automation with self-cocking shutters and film-plane metering.
- Steep learning curve: In addition to needing the knowledge required to operate a fully manual camera, view camera operators must understand a large number of technical matters that are not an issue to most small format photographers. They must understand, for example, view camera movements, bellows factors, and reciprocity. A great amount of time and study is needed to master those aspects of large format photography, so learning view camera operation requires a high degree of dedication.
- Large size and weight: monorail view cameras are unsuitable for handheld photography and are in most cases difficult to transport. A folding bed field camera like a Linhof Technika with a lens-coupled range finder system even allows action photography.
- Shallow depth of field: view cameras require longer focal length lenses than smaller format cameras, especially for the larger sizes, with shallower depth of field.
- Small maximum aperture: it is not feasible to make long focal length lenses with the wide maximum apertures available with shorter focal lengths.
- High cost: there is limited demand for view cameras, so that there are no economies of scale and they are much more expensive than mass-produced cameras. Some are handmade. Even though the cost of sheet film and processing is much higher than rollfilm, fewer sheets of film are exposed, which partially offsets the cost.

Some of these disadvantages can be viewed as advantages. For example, slow setup and composure time allow the photographer to better visualize the image before making an exposure. The shallow depth of field can be used to emphasize certain details and deemphasize others (in bokeh style, for example), especially combined with camera movements. The high cost of film and processing encourages careful planning. Because view cameras are rather difficult to set up and focus, the photographer must seek the best camera position, perspective, etc. before exposing. Beginning 35 mm photographers are even sometimes advised to use a tripod specifically because it slows down the picture-taking process.

== See also ==
- Cambo camera
- Deardorff
- Graflex
- Large format
- Large format lens
- Lensbaby
- Linhof
- Perspective control
- Press camera
- Sinar
- Tilt–shift photography § Perspective control lenses
