= Bauk =

Bauk may refer to:

- Bauk (field), a Scottish word for a strip of a corn field left fallow
- Bauk (mythology), a mythical creature in Serbian mythology
- Adrian Bauk (born 1985), a former Australian basketball player
- Arsen Bauk, (born 1973), a Croatian politician
- Braille Authority of the United Kingdom (BAUK)
