= Bauk (mythology) =

Serbian mythological creature

Bauk (Serbian: Баук, Serbian pronunciation: [bauk]) is an animal-like mythical creature in Serbian mythology. The bauk is described as hiding in dark places, holes, or abandoned houses, waiting to grab, carry away, and devour its victim; but it can be scared away by light and noise. It has a clumsy gait (called bauljanje), and its onomatopoeia is bau (Serbian pronunciation: [bau]).

Interpretation of the bauk's attributes leads to the conclusion that the bauk is actually a description of real bears, which were already regionally extinct in some parts of Serbia and known only as legend. The word "bauk" was initially used as a hypocorism.

== In popular culture ==
Bauk is used as the translation for goblin in Serbian editions of works of J. R. R. Tolkien, first translated by Mary and Milan Milišić. Bauk is also used as the translation for the Imp in the Serbian edition of A Song of Ice and Fire series, translated by Nikola Pajvančić. It's also used as the Croatian translation for Boggart in the Harry Potter book series.

In the cinematic reveal trailer for the upcoming video game The Witcher IV by Polish developer CD Projekt Red, the game's main protagonist Ciri can be seen fighting a bauk.

== See also ==
- Bear in culture
