= Back (American football) =

Position in American football

In American football, a back is a player who plays away from the line of scrimmage (as opposed to a lineman). Historically, the term "back" was used to describe multiple positions on offense and defense, although more descriptive and specific position naming is now common. Thus, "back" can refer to positions including:

== Offense ==
- Fullback, one of the two rushing positions, along with the halfback
- Halfback, one of the two rushing positions, along with the fullback
  - Tailback, a halfback who is lined up deep in the backfield, as in the I formation
- H-back, an offensive position that lines up similarly to a tight end, but is set back from the line of scrimmage
- Quarterback, a member of the offensive team that lines up directly behind the offensive line and receives the snap of the ball at the beginning of a play
- Running back, a member of the offensive backfield whose primary role is to receive handoffs from the quarterback to run with the ball
  - Singleback, an offensive formation that only requires one running back
- Slotback, a wide receiver on the offensive team that is positioned in the "slot" (located between the last offensive lineman/tight end and the next wide receiver)
- Upback, a blocker who lines up behind the line of scrimmage in punting situations
- Wingback, a position in the single wing formation, usually a running back

== Defense ==
- Defensive back, a member of the defensive team who take positions somewhat back from the line of scrimmage
  - Cornerback, a member of the defensive team that primarily defends wide receivers
  - Dimeback, a cornerback or safety who serves as the sixth defensive back
  - Nickelback, a cornerback or safety who serves as the additional defensive back in a nickel defense
- Linebacker, a member of the defensive team that is positioned approximately three to five yards behind the line of scrimmage

== See also ==
- History of American football positions
- Back (disambiguation)
