= Phase One (company) =

Camera manufacturer

Phase One A/S
- Type: Aktieselskab
- Industry: Digital imaging
- Founded: Denmark (1994)
- Headquarters: Copenhagen, Denmark
- Key people: Samir Léhaff, Founder; Arne Dehn, CEO
- Products: Cameras, Digital backs, Lenses, RAW Processing Software, Photo management software, Camera control software
- Revenue: DKK 308 million (2024)
- Operating income: ▲DKK 168 million (2015)
- Net income: ▲DKK 22 million (2015)
- Parent: Axcel
- Subsidiaries: Phase One U.S; Phase One Germany; Phase One China; Phase One Japan; Leaf Imaging/Phase One Israel; Mamiya Digital Imaging
- Website: www.phaseone.com
- Footnotes; Company is partially an employee owned organization.

Phase One A/S is a Danish company specializing in high-resolution digital imaging technology. The company develops camera systems and imaging solutions for aerial mapping and geospatial surveying, cultural heritage digitization, industrial inspection, security applications, space missions, and professional medium-format photography.

PODAS workshops (Phase One Digital Artist Series) is a series of worldwide photography workshops designed for digital photographers interested in working with medium format, high-resolution cameras. PODAS is a part of the Phase One educational division. Each attendee receives a Phase One digital camera system for the duration of the workshop.

On 18 February 2014, it was announced that UK-based private equity firm Silverfleet Capital would acquire a 60% majority stake in the company.

On 17 June 2019, Phase One A/S was once again sold, this time to the Danish investment company Axcel.

== Products ==
=== Cameras ===
In 2009, Phase One purchased a major stake in Japanese Mamiya and the two companies developed products together. Phase One's product line includes:

- Phase One XC
- Phase One XT
- Phase One XF
- Phase One 645DF+ (discontinued)
- Phase One 645DF (discontinued)
- Phase One 645AF (discontinued)
- Phase One iXM (aerial, surveillance and UAV operations)
- Phase One iXA (Aerial)
- Phase One iXG (Reproduction)
- Phase One iXR (Reproduction)
- Phase One iXU (aerial, surveillance and UAV operations)
- Phase One iXU-RS (aerial, surveillance and UAV operations)
- Phase One iXU-RS1900 (Fully self contained dual camera solution)
- Phase One iXM
- Phase One iXM-RS
- Phase One iXM-MV (Machine Vision)
- Phase One iXH (Reproduction)
- Phase One iXM-RC (Reproduction)
- Phase One iXM-SP (Made for Low Earth Orbit)
- Phase One iXM-GS (Global Shutter)
- Phase One iXM-FS (Fusion Shutter)

The Phase One 645DF+ and 645DF cameras are medium format cameras which support both focal plane and leaf shutter lenses with shutter speeds ranging from 1/4000s to 60 minutes and flash synchronization up to 1/1600 sec. Among the new features on the 645DF+ are:

- Fast and accurate auto focus especially in low contrast environments
- Custom focus fine-tuning adjustment
- Rechargeable Li-ion battery with up to 10,000 captures on one charge
- Rugged construction for high volume production use

The Phase One V-Grip Air vertical grip is compatible with the 645DF+/645DF. The V-Grip Air supports a Profoto Air flash trigger for wireless flash synchronization.

The 645DF+/645DF supports digital back interfaces including the IQ and P+ series digital backs as well as 3rd party digital backs from Hasselblad, Leaf and others.

In 2012, Phase One released two specialty cameras: iXR which is made specifically for reproduction and iXA which is made specifically for aerial photography. Both uses the 645 lenses as the normal 645 cameras. Main difference on this camera is they have no viewfinder and very few mechanical moving parts.

In 2013, Phase One signed a collaborative distribution agreement with Digital Transitions (DT) to deliver advanced digitization solutions for cultural heritage preservation imaging projects worldwide (Repro camera solutions). The range of Digital Transitions digitization equipment includes a multitude of reprographic benches, purpose-built reprographic cameras, specialized book copy stations, film scanning kits, and accessories that are designed to host the line of Phase One digital capture hardware and Capture One software.

In 2014, Phase One launched a medium format digital back with a CMOS/active pixel sensor: The IQ250. All Phase One digital backs launched prior to the IQ250 have sensors based on the CCD (Charge-coupled device) technology.

In 2015, Phase One introduced the XF camera system. It is a new digital camera platform, medium format system built with the intention to upgrade it over a series of updates throughout the product lifetime. At the same time, the IQ3 series digital backs were introduced. This included the IQ3 50MP based on the previous IQ250, the IQ3 60MP based on the previous IQ260 and the newly introduced IQ3 80MP which includes a new CCD (Charge-coupled device) sensor exclusive to Phase One.

In 2019, Phase One launched its IQ4 series of digital camera backs at 100MP to 150MP resolution (included with both the Phase One XF IQ4 150MP Camera (MSRP $51,990 without lens, 1 fps, DSLR) and the Phase One XT IQ4 150MP Camera (MSRP $56,990 without lens, 1 fps, mirrorless)), with the 150MP generating 120.26 x 90.19 cm (47.35" x 35.5") 16-bit color images at 300dpi.

In August 2025, Phase One announced a leadership transition. Long-serving CEO Henrik Håkonsson stepped down from his executive role and joined the company's board of directors. Arne Dehn, formerly CEO of STEMMER IMAGING, was appointed Chief Executive Officer effective 1 September 2025. At the same time, Casper Jensen was appointed Chairman of the Board*Plain Text

=== Lenses ===
The 645DF / DF+ / XF is compatible with the following lenses:

- Phase One Digital focal plane lenses
- Schneider Kreuznach leaf shutter lenses
- Mamiya 645 AF lenses
- Mamiya 645 manual lenses (mechanical lens modification is required for the Phase One XF)
- Compatible with Hasselblad V and Pentacon 6 (via multimount adaptor)

==== Phase One ====
Focal length	Maximum Aperture range	Designator	Optical Construction	Shutter speed	Minimum focusing distance	Filter thread	Equivalent 35mm Focal Length	Dimension	Weight
28mm	f/4.5–32	AF Aspherical	14 elements, 10 groups	N/A	35 cm /1.15 ft	Rear sheet filter / Optional LEE SW150 filter	17mm	136 x 90mm / 5.35 x 3. 54"	886g / 31.01 oz. 1.9 lbs.
35mm	f/3.5–22	AF	9 elements, 5 groups	N/A	35 cm / 1.15 ft	77mm	22mm	62mm x 84mm 2.4” x 3.3”	480g
45mm	f/2.8–22	AF	9 elements, 7 groups	N/A	45 cm / 1.4 ft.	67mm	29mm	49.5 x 77mm / 1.9 x 3"	492 g. / 17.35 oz. / 1.1 lbs.
80mm	f/2.8.5–22	AF	6 elements, 5 groups	N/A	70 cm / 2.3 ft.	67mm	50mm	51.5 x 80.5mm / 2 x 3.2"	330 g. / 0.7 lbs / 11.6 oz.
120mm	f/4–22	MF Macro	9 elements, 8 groups	N/A	40 cm / 1.3 ft.	67mm	73mm	111 x 83mm / 4.4 x 3.25"	835 g. / 1.8 lbs / 29.2 oz.
120mm	f/4–22	AF Macro	9 elements, 8 groups	N/A	0.37 m / 1.21 ft	72mm	73mm	107 x 91 mm / 4.2 x 3.6 "	960 g / 2.12 lbs. /33.86 oz.
120mm	f/5.6-22	TS (Tilt/Shift)	6 elements, 4 groups	N/A	0.84m	104mm	72mm	135 x 106 mm	
150mm	f/2.8–22	AF IF	8 elements, 7 groups	N/A	100 cm / 3.3 ft.	72mm	93mm	120 x 85mm / 4.7 x 33"	780 g. / 1.7 lbs / 27.03 oz.
75-150mm	f/4.5-32	AF Zoom	11 elements, 10 groups	N/A	1.00m / 3.3 ft.	77mm	47mm-93mm	145 x 86mm 7 5.7 x 3.4"	1114 g. / 2.5 lbs / 38.99 oz.

==== Schneider Kreuznach ====
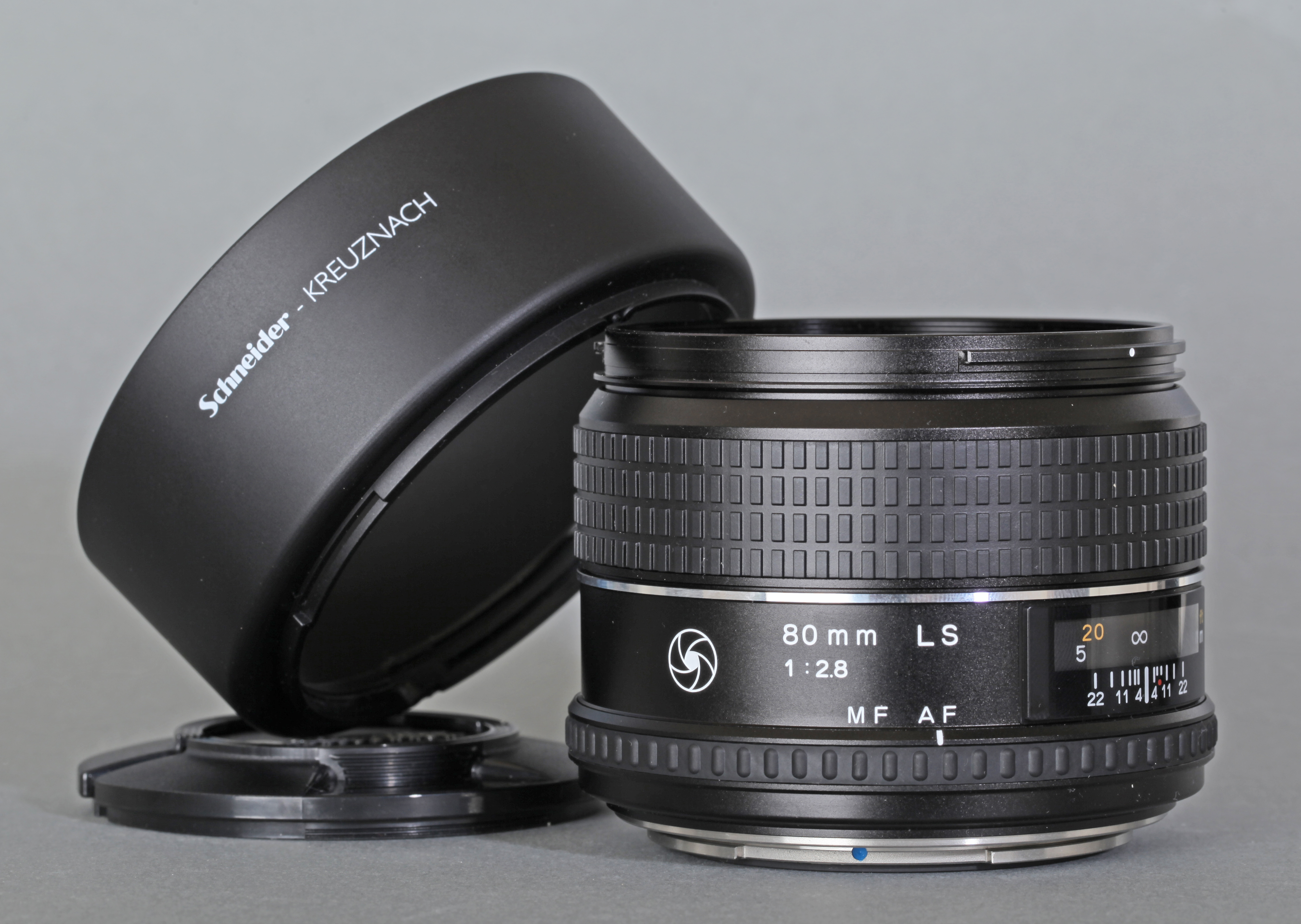
Schneider Kreuznach 80mm f/2.8

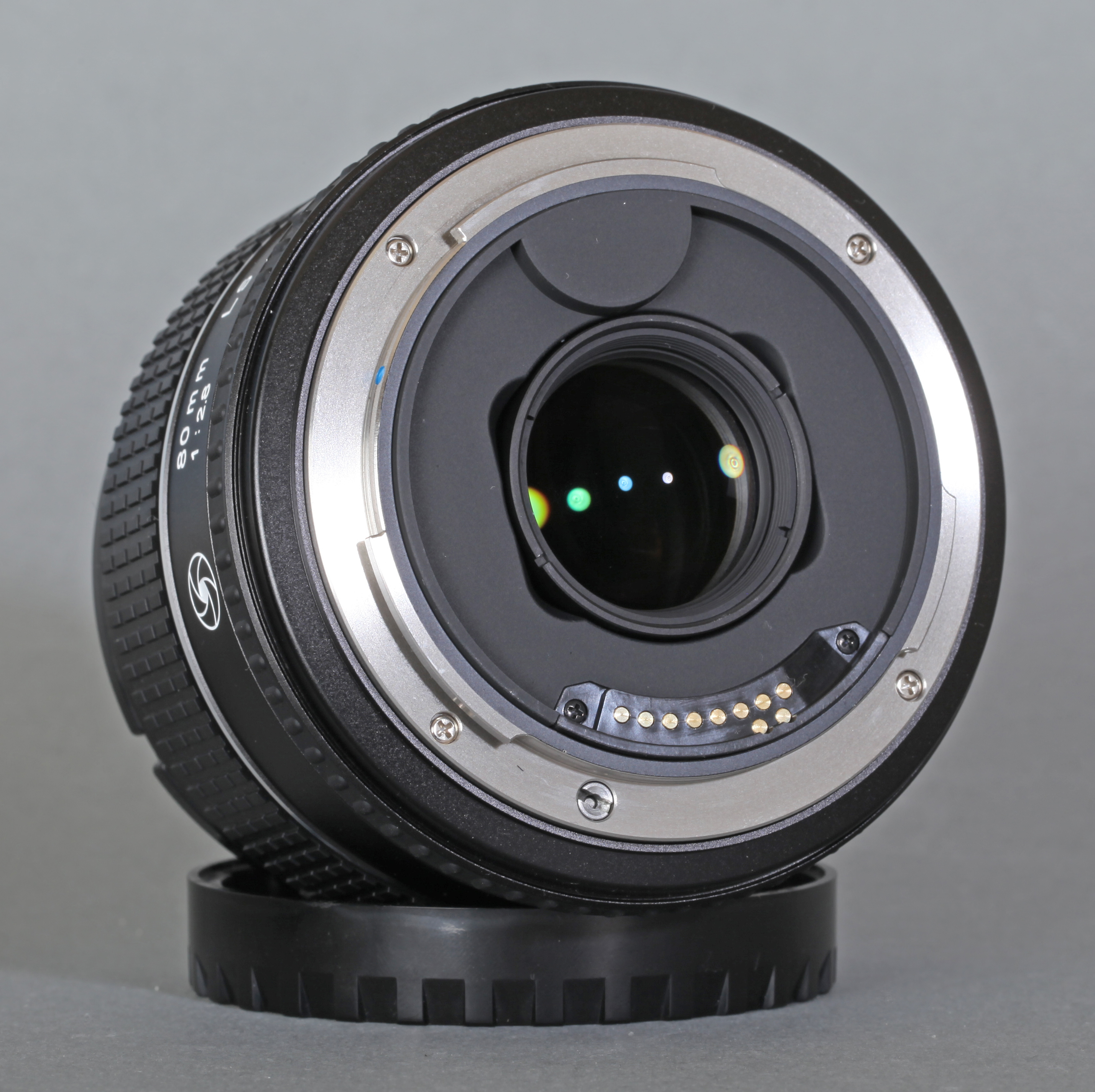
Schneider Kreuznach 80mm f/2.8 rear

Focal length	Maximum Aperture range	Designator	Optical Construction	Shutter speed	Minimum focusing distance	Filter thread	Equivalent 35mm Focal Length	Dimension	Weight
28mm	f/4.5–32	LS Aspherical	14 elements, 10 groups	1/1600	35 cm /1.15 ft	Rear sheet filter / Optional LEE SW150 filter	17mm	90 x 136mm / 3.5 x 5.5”	1100g /2.43bs / 38.80 oz.
55mm	f/2.8–32	LS	7 elements, 6 groups	1/1600	45 cm / 1.47 ft.	72mm	34mm	77.6 x 86.5mm / 3 x 3.4	660 g / 1.3 lbs. / 21.15 oz.
80mm	f/2.8–22	LS	6 elements, 5 groups	1/1600	70 cm / 2.3 ft.	72mm	50mm	64.4 x 86.5 / 2.5 x 3.4"	500g / 1.1 lbs. / 17.6 oz.
110mm	f/2.8–22	LS	6 elements, 5 groups	1/1600	90 cm / 2.9 ft.	72mm	68mm	83.3 x 86.5mm / 3.2 x 3.4"	700g / 1.5 lbs. / 24.69 oz
150mm	f/3.5–32	LS	5 elements, 5 groups	1/1600	150 cm / 4.92 ft.	72mm	96mm	87.1 x 86.5mm / 3.4 x 3.4"	652g / 1.43 lbs. / 22.99 oz.
240mm	f/4.5–22	LS IF	8 elements, 8 groups	1/1000	170 cm /5.58 ft	86mm	149mm	169 x 104.5mm / 6.7 x 4.1”	1600g /3.53bs / 56.44 oz.
40-80mm	f/4–32 / 5.6–45	LS	15 elements, 11 groups	1/1600	0.60m / 1.97 ft.	105mm	25mm-50mm	5.90 x 4.40 " / 150 x 111 mm	4.1 lbs. / 1860 g / 65.60 oz.
75-150mm	f/4–22 / 5.6-45	LS	11 elements, 10 groups	1/1600	1.00m / 3.28 ft.	95mm	47mm-93mm	172 x 105.5mm / 6.8 x 4.2”	1800g / 3.96 lb / 63.49 oz.

Focal length	Maximum Aperture range	Designator	Optical Construction	Shutter speed	Minimum focusing distance	Filter thread	Equivalent 35mm Focal Length	Dimension	Weight
35mm	f/3.5–32	LS Blue Ring	11 elements, 8 groups	1/1600	0.5m / 1.64 ft	105mm	22mm	111mm x 119mm, 4.4" x 4.7"	1370g
45mm	f/3.5–32	LS Blue Ring	10 elements, 7 groups	1/1600	55 cm / 1.80 ft	95mm	28mm	101 x 122.9mm /4.0 x 4.8”	
55mm	f/2.8–32	LS Blue Ring	7 elements, 6 groups	1/1600	45 cm / 1.47 ft.	72mm	34mm	77.6 x 86.5mm / 3 x 3.4	660 g / 1.3 lbs. / 21.15 oz.
80mm	f/2.8–22	LS Blue Ring	6 elements, 5 groups	1/1600	70 cm / 2.3 ft.	72mm	50mm	64.4 x 86.5 / 2.5 x 3.4"	500g / 1.1 lbs. / 17.6 oz.
80mm Mark II	f/2.8–32	LS Blue Ring	8 elements, 6 groups	1/1600	70 cm / 2.3 ft.	72mm	50mm	85.4 x 87.2 / 3.4 x 3.4"	765g / 1.69 lbs.
110mm	f/2.8–22	LS Blue Ring	6 elements, 5 groups	1/1600	90 cm / 2.9 ft.	72mm	68mm	83.3 x 86.5mm / 3.2 x 3.4"	700g / 1.5 lbs. / 24.69 oz
120mm	f/4–22	LS Macro Blue Ring	9 elements, 8 groups	1/1600	40 cm / 1.3 ft.	86mm	73mm	111 x 83mm / 4.4 x 3.25"	835 g. / 1.8 lbs / 29.2 oz.
150mm	f/3.5–32	LS Blue Ring	5 elements, 5 groups	1/1600	150 cm / 4.92 ft.	72mm	96mm	87.1 x 86.5mm / 3.4 x 3.4"	652g / 1.43 lbs. / 22.99 oz.
150mm	f/2.8–22	LS IF Blue Ring	8 elements, 7 groups	1/1600	1.0m / 3.28 ft	95mm	96mm	115 x 141.6mm /4.5 x 5.6”	1.658g / 3.65 lb
240mm	f/4.5–22	LS IF Blue Ring	8 elements, 8 groups	1/1000	170 cm /5.58 ft	86mm	149mm	169 x 104.5mm / 6.7 x 4.1”	1600g /3.53bs / 56.44 oz.
40-80mm	f/4–32 / 5.6–45	LS Blue Ring	15 elements, 11 groups	1/1600	0.60m / 1.97 ft.	105mm	25mm-50mm	5.90 x 4.40 " / 150 x 111 mm	4.1 lbs. / 1860 g / 65.60 oz.
75-150mm	f/4–22 / 5.6-45	LS Blue Ring	11 elements, 10 groups	1/1600	1.00m / 3.28 ft.	95mm	47mm-93mm	172 x 105.5mm / 6.8 x 4.2”	1800g / 3.96 lb / 63.49 oz.

==== Rodenstock ====
Phase One XT compatible lenses

Focal length	Designator	Maximum Aperture range	Glass manufacturar	Shutter speed	Filter thread
23mm	HR Digaron S	f/5.6–22	Rodenstock	1/1000	72mm
32mm	HR Digaron W	f/4–22	Rodenstock	1/1000	86mm
40mm Tilt	HR Digaron W	f/4–22	Rodenstock	1/1000	67mm
50mm	HR Digaron W	f/4–22	Rodenstock	1/1000	67mm
70mm	HR Digaron W	f/5.6–22	Rodenstock	1/1000	58mm
90mm	HR Digaron W	f/5.6–22	Rodenstock	1/1000	72mm
150mm	HO-S SB	f/5.6–22	Phase One	1/1000	72mm

*In addition, any medium or large format lens which has sufficient image circle and resolution with the Cambo lens mount

=== Industrial lenses ===
RS Lenses compatible with iXM-RS

Focal length	Maximum Aperture range	Glass manufacturar	Shutter speed	Filter thread	Weight
32mm	f/4–22	Rodenstock	1/2500	86mm	970g
40mm	f/4–22	Rodenstock	1/2500	67mm	730g
50mm	f/4–22	Rodenstock	1/2500	67mm	800g
70mm	f/5.6–22	Rodenstock	1/2500	58mm	580g
90mm	f/5.6–22	Rodenstock	1/2500	72mm	1150g
110mm	f/4–22	Schneider-Kreuznach	1/2500	58mm	620g
150mm	f/5.6–22	Schneider-Kreuznach	1/2500	67mm	1150g
180mm	f/6.3–22	Rodenstock	1/2000	67mm	1400g

RSM lenses compatible with iXM

Focal length	Maximum Aperture range	Focus distance	Glass manufacturar	Shutter speed	Filter thread	Weight
35mm	f/5.6–22	Infinity	Phase One	1/2500	58mm	540g
80mm	f/5.6–22	Infinity	Phase One	1/2500	58mm	470g
80mm AF	f/5.6–22	3m to Infinity	Phase One	1/2500	58mm	630g
150mm AF	f/5.6–22	10m to Infinity	Phase One	1/2500	58mm	744g
300mm	f/8–32	10m to Infinity	Phase One	1/2000	86mm	1900g

Lenses for iXM-MV NOTE: iXM-MV is also compatible with Schneider-Kreuznach medium format lenses

Focal length	Maximum Aperture range	Focus distance	Glass manufacturar	Shutter speed	Filter thread	Weight
60mm	f/4–22	334mm to Infinity	Linos	N/A	60mm	240g
100mm	f/4–22	570mm to Infinity	Linos	N/A	M58X0.75 mm	340g
105mm	f/5.6–22	183mm to 241mm	Linos	N/A	M43X0.75 mm	360g
105mm Float	f/5.6–16	100mm to 417mm	Linos	N/A	M43X0.75 mm	360g

=== Digital backs ===
==== IQ4 series ====
Model	Sensor size	Sensor type	Resolution	Active pixels	ISO range	Dynamic range (Extended Mode / Normal)	Frames per Second LS/FP (IIQs FPS)	Lens conversion factor	Display	Storage	Host connection	Released
IQ4 150MP	53.4 × 40 mm	CMOS	151 MP 16-bit	14204 × 10652	50–25600	15/14.5 f-stops	1.2 / 1.4 (2.5)	1.0	3.2-inch 1.5-megapixel Retina-type multi touchscreen	XQD and SD Card (CFExpress supported as of Firmware 8)	USB-C, Ethernet and WiFi	2018
IQ4 150MP Achromatic	53.4 × 40 mm	CMOS	151 MP 16-bit	14204 × 10652	200–102400	15/14.5 f-stops	1.2 / 1.4 (2.5)	1.0	3.2-inch 1.5-megapixel Retina-type multi touchscreen	XQD and SD Card (CFExpress supported as of Firmware 8)	USB-C, Ethernet and WiFi	2018
IQ4 100MP Trichromatic	53.7 × 40.4 mm	CMOS	101 MP, 16-bit	11608 × 8708	35–12800	15 f-stops	0.7 / 1.4	1.0	3.2-inch 1.5-megapixel Retina-type multi touchscreen	XQD and SD Card (CFExpress supported as of Firmware 8)	USB-C, Ethernet and WiFi	2018

==== IQ3 series ====
Model	Sensor size	Sensor type	Resolution (Sensor+ mode)	Active pixels	ISO range (Sensor+ mode)	Dynamic range	Frames per Second (Sensor+ mode)	Lens conversion factor	Display	Storage	Host connection	Released
IQ3 100MP Trichromatic	53.7 × 40.4 mm	CMOS	101 MP (N/A), 16-bit	11608 × 8708	35–12800 (N/A)	15 f-stops	0.7 / 1.4 / N/A	1.0	3.2-inch 1.5-megapixel Retina-type touchscreen	CF up to UDMA 7	IEEE 1394b Firewire800, USB3 / USB2 and WiFi	2017
IQ3 100MP Achromatic	53.7 × 40.4 mm	CMOS	101 MP (N/A), 16-bit	11608 × 8708	200–51200 (N/A)	15 f-stops	0.6 / 1.1 / N/A	1.0	3.2-inch 1.5-megapixel Retina-type touchscreen	CF up to UDMA 7	IEEE 1394b Firewire800, USB3 / USB2 and WiFi	2017
IQ3 100MP	53.7 × 40.4 mm	CMOS	101 MP (N/A), 16-bit	11608 × 8708	50–12800 (N/A)	15 f-stops	0.7 / 1.4 / N/A	1.0	3.2-inch 1.5-megapixel Retina-type touchscreen	CF up to UDMA 7	IEEE 1394b Firewire800, USB3 / USB2 and WiFi	2016
IQ3 80MP	53.7 × 40.4 mm	CCD	80 MP (20 MP), 16-bit	10328 × 7760	50–800 (140 - 3200)	13 f-stops	0.8 / N/A / 1.1	1.0	3.2-inch 1.5-megapixel Retina-type touchscreen	CF up to UDMA 7	IEEE 1394b Firewire800, USB3 / USB2 and WiFi	2015
IQ3 60MP	53.9 × 40.4 mm	CCD	60.5 MP (15 MP), 16-bit	8984 × 6732	50–800 (200 - 3200)	13 f-stops	1.0 / N/A / 1.4	1.0	3.2-inch 1.5-megapixel Retina-type touchscreen	CF up to UDMA 7	IEEE 1394b Firewire800, USB3 / USB2 and WiFi	2015
IQ3 50MP	44.0 × 33.0 mm	CMOS	51 MP (N/A), 14-bit	8280 × 6208	100 - 6400	14 f-stops	N/A / 1.8 / N/A	1.3	3.2-inch 1.5-megapixel Retina-type touchscreen	CF up to UDMA 7	IEEE 1394b Firewire800, USB3 / USB2 and WiFi	2015

==== IQ2 series ====
Model	Sensor size	Sensor type	Resolution (Sensor+ mode)	Active pixels	ISO range (Sensor+ mode)	Dynamic range	Frames per Second (Sensor+ mode)	Lens conversion factor	Display	Storage	Host connection	Released
IQ280	53.7 × 40.4 mm	CCD	80 MP (20 MP), 16-bit	10328 × 7760	35–800 (140 - 3200)	13 f-stops	0.7 / (0.9)	1.0	3.2-inch 1.5-megapixel Retina-type touchscreen	CF up to UDMA 6	IEEE 1394b Firewire800, USB3 / USB2 and WiFi	2013
IQ260	53.9 × 40.4 mm	CCD	60.5 MP (15 MP), 16-bit	8984 × 6732	50–800 (200 - 3200)	13 f-stops	1.0 / (1.4)	1.0	3.2-inch 1.5-megapixel Retina-type touchscreen	CF up to UDMA 6	IEEE 1394b Firewire800, USB3 / USB2 and WiFi	2013
IQ260 Achromatic	53.9 × 40.4 mm	CCD	60.5 MP (N/A), 16-bit	8984 × 6732	50–800 (200 - 3200)	13 f-stops	1.0 / (1.4)	1.0	3.2-inch 1.5-megapixel Retina-type touchscreen	CF up to UDMA 6	IEEE 1394b Firewire800, USB3 / USB2 and WiFi	2013
IQ250	44.0 × 33.0 mm	CMOS	50.0 MP (N/A), 14-bit	8280 × 6208	100 - 6400	14 f-stops	1.2	1.3	3.2-inch 1.5-megapixel Retina-type touchscreen	CF up to UDMA 6	IEEE 1394b Firewire800, USB3 / USB2 and WiFi	2014

==== IQ1 series ====
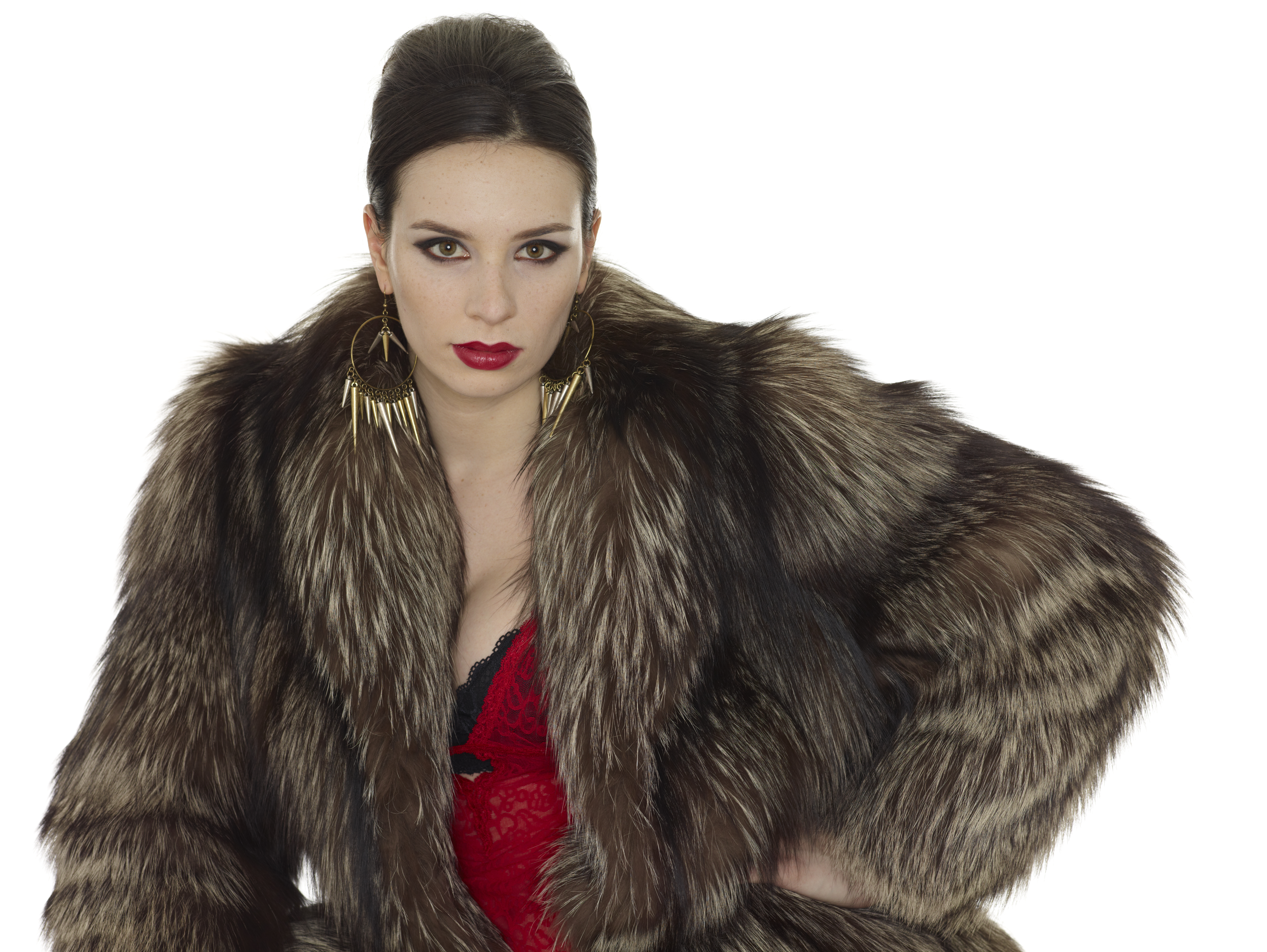
An 80 MP photo taken with an IQ180 digital back (color-profile not handled correctly by some browsers)

The IQ series Phase One backs included many industry-first innovations. It was the first camera series to utilize a USB 3 connection. At the time of the release, this was not very widespread, but did allow for backwards compatibility with USB 2.0. It was also the first camera series to include a high resolution multi-touch display, similar to the "Retina" screen used in the iPhone 4.

Model	Sensor size	Sensor type	Resolution (Sensor+ mode)	Active pixels	ISO range (Sensor+ mode)	Dynamic range	Frames per Second (Sensor+ mode)	Lens conversion factor	Display	Storage	Host connection	Released
IQ1 100MP	53.7 × 40.4 mm	CMOS	101 MP (N/A), 16-bit	11608 × 8708	50–12800 (N/A)	15 f-stops	0.7 / (N/A)	1.0	3.2-inch 1.5-megapixel Retina-type touchscreen	CF up to UDMA 6	IEE1394b Firewire800, USB3 / USB2	2016
IQ180	53.7 × 40.4 mm	CCD	80 MP (20 MP), 16-bit	10328 × 7760	35–800 (140 - 3200)	12.5 f-stops	0.7 / (0.9)	1.0	3.2-inch 1.5-megapixel Retina-type touchscreen	CF up to UDMA 6	IEE1394b Firewire800, USB3 / USB2	2011
IQ160	53.9 × 40.4 mm	CCD	60.5 MP (15 MP), 16-bit	8984 × 6732	50–800 (200 - 3200)	12.5 f-stops	1.0 / (1.4)	1.0	3.2-inch 1.5-megapixel Retina-type touchscreen	CF up to UDMA 6	IEE1394b Firewire800, USB3 / USB2	2011
IQ150	44.0 × 33.0 mm	CMOS	50.0 MP (N/A), 14-bit	8280 × 6208	100 - 6400	14 f-stops	1.2	1.3	3.2-inch 1.5-megapixel Retina-type touchscreen	CF up to UDMA 6	IEE1394b Firewire800, USB3 / USB2	2014
IQ140	43.9 × 32.9 mm	CCD	40 MP (10 MP), 16-bit	7320 × 5484	50–800 (200 - 3200)	12 f-stops	1.2 / (1.8)	1.3	3.2-inch 1.5-megapixel Retina-type touchscreen	CF up to UDMA 6	IEE1394b Firewire800, USB3 / USB2	2011

==== P+ series ====
The P+ series are similar to the normal P series but have higher capture speeds, better response to long exposure times, and add Live Preview, which allows the user to focus and compose on a monitor while tethered. Also, a new high resolution LCD screen was implemented with better resolution and luminance.

Model	Sensor size	Resolution (Sensor+ mode)	Active pixels	ISO range (Sensor+ mode)	Dynamic range	Frames per Second (Sensor+ mode)	Lens conversion factor	Display	Storage	Host connection	Released
P65+	53.9 × 40.4mm	60.5 MP (15 MP), 16-bit	8984 × 6732	50–800 (200–3200)	12.5 f-stops	1.0 / (1.4)	1.0	2.2-inch 230,000 px TFT	CF	IEEE 1394 Firewire	2008
P45+	49.1 × 36.8 mm	39 MP, 16-bit	7216 × 5412	50–800	12 f-stops	0.67	1.15	2.2-inch 230,000 px TFT	CF	IEEE 1394 Firewire	2007
P40+	43.9 × 32.9 mm	40 MP (10 MP), 16-bit	7320 × 5484	50–800 (200 - 3200)	12 f-stops	1.2 / (1.8)	1.25	2.2-inch 230,000 px TFT	CF	IEEE 1394 Firewire	2009
P30+	44.2 × 33.1 mm	31.6 MP, 16-bit	6496 × 4872	100–1600	12 f-stops	0.8	1.25	2.2-inch 230,000 px TFT	CF	IEEE 1394 Firewire	2007
P25+	48.9 × 36.7 mm	22 MP, 16-bit	5436 × 4080	50–800	12 f-stops	0.67	1.15	2.2-inch 230,000 px TFT	CF	IEEE 1394 Firewire	2007
P21+	44.2 × 33.1 mm	18 MP, 16-bit	4904 × 3678	100–800	12 f-stops	1.25	1.25	2.2-inch 230,000 px TFT	CF	IEEE 1394 Firewire	2007
P20+	36.9 × 36.9 mm	16 MP, 16-bit	4080 × 4080	50–800	12 f-stops	0.87	1.5	2.2-inch 230,000 px TFT	CF	IEEE 1394 Firewire	2007

==== P series ====
The P series are fully untethered backs available for many different camera mounts.

Model	Sensor size	Resolution	Active pixels	ISO range	Dynamic range	Frames per Second	Lens conversion factor	Display	Storage	Host connection	Released
P45	49.1 × 36.8 mm	39 MP, 16-bit	7216 × 5412	50–400	12 f-stops	0,58	1.15	2.2-inch 116,000 px TFT	CF	IEEE 1394 Firewire	2005
P30	44.2 × 33.1 mm	31.6 MP, 16-bit	6496 × 4872	100–800	12 f-stops	0,67	1.25	2.2-inch 116,000 px TFT	CF	IEEE 1394 Firewire	2005
P25	48.9 × 36.7 mm	22 MP, 16-bit	5436 × 4080	50–800	12 f-stops	0,58	1.15	2.2-inch 116,000 px TFT	CF	IEEE 1394 Firewire	2004
P21	44.2 × 33.1 mm	18 MP, 16-bit	4904 × 3678	100–800	12 f-stops	1,0	1.25	2.2-inch 116,000 px TFT	CF	IEEE 1394 Firewire	2005
P20	36.9 × 36.9 mm	16 MP, 16-bit	4080 × 4080	50–800	12 f-stops	0,7	1.5	2.2-inch 116,000 px TFT	CF	IEEE 1394 Firewire	2004

==== H series ====
The H series are tethered backs available for many different camera mounts. Camera back connects through standard 6pin IEEE 1394. Originally this type of camera back was released as the "Lightphase", a continuation of Phase One's previous tradition of using the name "phase" in the name of the product. This changed with the release of the "H20", which was originally called "Lightphase H20" but the name was changed to "Phase One H20" for better brand recognition.

Model	Sensor size	Resolution	Active pixels	ISO range	Dynamic range	Frames per Second	Lens conversion factor	Display	Storage	Host connection	Released
H25	48.9 × 36.7 mm	22 MP, 16-bit	5436 × 4080	50–400	12 f-stops	0,5	1.15	N/A	N/A	IEEE 1394 Firewire	2003
H20	36.9 × 36.9 mm	16 MP, 16-bit	4080 × 4080	50–100	12 f-stops	0,33	1.5	N/A	N/A	IEEE 1394 Firewire	2001
H101 / H10	36.9 × 24.6 mm	11 MP, 16-bit	3992 × 2656	50–400			1.65	N/A	N/A	IEEE 1394 Firewire	2002
H5/H10	36 × 24 mm	6 MP, 16-bit	3056 × 2032	50–100			1.65	N/A	N/A	IEEE 1394 Firewire	2002
Lightphase	36 × 24 mm	6 MP, 16-bit	3056 × 2032	50–100			1.65	N/A	N/A	IEEE 1394 Firewire	1998

==== Scan backs ====
The Scan backs are tethered digital scan backs. All use SCSI connection except for PowerPhase FX, which uses IEEE 1394 "Firewire". The very early models, which were known as the CB6x (StudioKit) and FC70 (PhotoPhase), were made in plastic and had an external control unit that connected to a computer through NuBus.

Model	Sensor size	Resolution	ISO range	Host connection	Released
PowerPhase FX/FX+	12,600 steps × 10,500 pixels	132 MP, 14-bit	100–1600	IEEE 1394 Firewire	2000
PowerPhase	7,000 steps × 7,000 pixels	36 MP, 12-bit	N/A	SCSI	1997
PhotoPhase	7,200 steps × 5,000 pixels	36 MP, 10-bit	N/A	SCSI	1996
StudioKit	3,600 steps × 2,500 pixels	9 MP, 10-bit	N/A	SCSI	1996

=== XF Camera System feature updates ===
The XF Camera System is upgradable and received various planned new features and functionality over its product lifetime.

- Feature Update #1 - October 2015
  - Vibration Delay, Bullseye Level Tool, Hyperfocal Point Tool, Capture One Focus Step
- Feature Update #2 - March 2016
  - Focus Stacking Tool, Timelapse Tool, HAP-1 Update, OneTouch UI
- Feature Update #3 - October 2016
  - Profoto Air Tool, Electronic Shutter, Flash Analysis, Icon Control
- Feature Update #4 - September 2017
  - Autofocus & Recompose, Automatic Focus Stack Calculator, Focus Trim Tool, Vibration Analysis
- Creative Control Enhancement (Feature Update #5) - July 2019
  - Automated Frame Averaging, Custom IQ Styles, Storage Flexibility Options (IQ4 Only)
- XT Update Package (Feature Update #6) - October 2019
  - Update to support the new XT body and lenses (IQ4 Only)
- Phase One Lab update (Feature Update #7) - March 2020
  - Support for new Dual Exposure+ (IQ4-150 Only)
- Feature Update #8 - December 2020
  - Support for CFExpress, higher capture rate on XF body, ETTR option, Ad-Hoc WiFi.

=== Repro camera solutions ===
Phase One reprographic camera systems and book capture / scanners are purpose-built to provide preservation-level rapid capture of rare books, circulation materials, manuscripts, documents, photographic slides, photographic negatives and photographic glass-plates.

Phase One repro camera solutions include the following products:

==== iXG / iXH series ====
Model	Sensor size	Sensor type	Resolution	Active pixels	ISO range (Sensor+ mode)	Dynamic range	Shutter speeds	Display	Onboard Storage	Host connection	Released
iXH 150MP	53.4 × 40 mm	CMOS	150 MP, 16-bit	14204 × 10652	50–25600 (N/A)	15 f-stops	1/250th to 1h	N/A	N/A	USB-C and 10Gb Ethernet	2020
iXH 100MP	43.9 × 32.9 mm	CMOS	101 MP, 16-bit	11656 x 8742	50–6400 (N/A)	15 f-stops	1/250th to 1h	N/A	N/A	USB-C and 10Gb Ethernet	2024
iXG 100MP	53.7 × 40.4 mm	CMOS	101 MP, 16-bit	11608 × 8708	200–51200 (N/A)	15 f-stops	1/250th to 1h	3.2-inch 1.5-megapixel Retina-type touchscreen	N/A	Firewire800, USB3 / USB2	2017
iXG 50MP	44.0 × 33.0 mm	CMOS	101 MP, 16-bit	8280 × 6208	100 - 6400 (N/A)	14 f-stops	1/250th to 1h	3.2-inch 1.5-megapixel Retina-type touchscreen	N/A	Firewire800, USB3 / USB2	2017

- Phase One IXR camera body (Uses an option of different camera backs)

The above camera systems are purpose-built for the following solutions but compatible with standard Reproduction systems.

- RG3040 reprographic system
- RGC180 capture cradle
- BC100 Book capture system
- Film scanning kit

=== Industrial Cameras ===
==== iXM-RS series ====
Model	Sensor size	Sensor type	Resolution	Active pixels	ISO range	Dynamic range (Extended Mode / Normal)	Frames per Second (IIQs)	Storage	Host connection	Released
iXM-RS250F	54 × 36 mm	CMOS	247 MP 16-bit	19240 x 12840	100–6400	81db	2.0	CFExpress	USB-C, 10G Ethernet and HDMI	2025
iXM-RS250F Achromatic	54 × 36 mm	CMOS	247 MP 16-bit	19240 x 12840	400–25600	81db	2.0	CFExpress	USB-C, 10G Ethernet and HDMI	2025
iXM-RS280F	2 x 53.4 × 40 mm	CMOS	280 MP 16-bit	20150 x 14118	50–6400	83db	2.0	N/A	USB-C, 10G Ethernet.	2022
iXM-RS150F	53.4 × 40 mm	CMOS	151 MP 16-bit	14204 × 10652	50–6400	83db	2.0	XQD (CFExpress supported as of Firmware 4)	USB-C, 10G Ethernet and HDMI	2020
iXM-RS150F Achromatic	53.4 × 40 mm	CMOS	151 MP 16-bit	14204 × 10652	200-25600	83db	2.0	XQD (CFExpress supported as of Firmware 4)	USB-C, 10G Ethernet and HDMI	2020
iXM-RS100F	53.7 × 40.4 mm	CMOS	101 MP, 16-bit	11608 × 8708	50–6400	84db	1.6	XQD (CFExpress supported as of Firmware 4)	USB-C, 10G Ethernet and HDMI	2020
iXM-RS100F Achromatic	53.7 × 40.4 mm	CMOS	101 MP, 16-bit	11608 × 8708	200–12800	84db	1.6	XQD (CFExpress supported as of Firmware 4)	USB-C, 10G Ethernet and HDMI	2020

==== iXM series ====
Model	Sensor size	Sensor type	Resolution	Active pixels	ISO range	Dynamic range (Extended Mode / Normal)	Frames per Second (IIQs)	Storage	Host connection	Released
iXM-FS130	43.9x32.9 mm	CMOS	128 MP, 14-bit	13468 x 9564	200–64000	80db	8.0	XQD / CFExpress	USB-C 10G Ethernet and HDMI	2026
iXM-FS130 Achromatic	43.9x32.9 mm	CMOS	128 MP, 14-bit	13498 x 9564	800–64000	80db	8.0	XQD / CFExpress	USB-C 10G Ethernet and HDMI	2026
iXM-GS120	43.9x32.9 mm	CMOS	120 MP, 14-bit	12768 x 9564	200–64000	80db	8.0	XQD / CFExpress	USB-C 10G Ethernet and HDMI	2022
iXM-GS120 Achromatic	43.9x32.9 mm	CMOS	120 MP, 14-bit	12768 x 9564	800–64000	80db	8.0	XQD / CFExpress	USB-C 10G Ethernet and HDMI	2022
iXM-100	43.9x32.9 mm	CMOS	101 MP, 16-bit	11664 x 8750	50–6400	83db	3.0	XQD / CFExpress	USB-C 10G Ethernet and HDMI	2019
iXM-50	43.9x32.9 mm	CMOS	50 MP, 14-bit	11608 × 8708	100–6400	84db	2.0	XQD / CFExpress	USB-C 10G Ethernet and HDMI	2019

==== iXU-RS series ====
Model	Sensor size	Sensor type	Resolution	Active pixels	ISO range	Dynamic range	Frames per Second (IIQs)	Storage	Host connection	Released
iXU-RS-1000	43.9x32.9 mm	CMOS	101 MP, 16-bit	11664 x 8750	50–6400	84db	1.65	CF card UDMA 6 or 7)	USB 3 and HDMI (CMOS only)	2016
iXU-180	53.7 x 40.4 mm	CCD	80 MP, 16-bit	10328 x 7760	35-800	72db	0.68	CF card UDMA 6 or 7)	USB 3 and HDMI (CMOS only)	2016
iXU-RS-160	53.9 x 40.4 mm	CCD	60 MP, 16-bit	8984 x 6732	50-800	72db	0.9	CF card UDMA 6 or 7)	USB 3 and HDMI (CMOS only)	2016
iXU-RS-160 Achromatic	53.8 x 40.3 mm	CCD	60 MP, 16-bit	8964 x 6716	200–3200	72db	0.9	CF card UDMA 6 or 7)	USB 3 and HDMI (CMOS only)	2016

==== iXU series ====
Model	Sensor size	Sensor type	Resolution	Active pixels	ISO range	Dynamic range	Frames per Second (IIQs)	Storage	Host connection	Released
iXU-1000	43.9x32.9 mm	CMOS	101 MP, 16-bit	11664 x 8750	50–6400	84db	1.0	CF card (UDMA 6 or 7)	USB 3 and HDMI (CMOS only)	2016
iXU-180	53.7 x 40.4 mm	CCD	80 MP, 16-bit	10328 x 7760	35-800	72db	0.6	CF card (UDMA 6 or 7)	USB 3 and HDMI (CMOS only)	2014
iXU-160	53.9 x 40.4 mm	CCD	60 MP, 16-bit	8984 x 6732	50-800	72db	0.7	CF card (UDMA 6 or 7)	USB 3 and HDMI (CMOS only)	2014
iXU-160 Achromatic	53.8 x 40.3 mm	CCD	60 MP, 16-bit	8964 x 6716	200–3200	72db	0.7	CF card (UDMA 6 or 7)	USB 3 and HDMI (CMOS only)	2014
iXU-150	43.8 x 32.9 mm	CMOS	50 MP, 14-bit	8280 x 6208	100–6400	84db	1.2	CF card (UDMA 6 or 7)	USB 3 and HDMI (CMOS only)	2016

==== iXA series ====
Model	Sensor size	Sensor type	Resolution	Active pixels	ISO range	Dynamic range	Frames per Second (IIQs)	Released
iXA-180	53.7 x 40.4 mm	CCD	80 MP, 16-bit	10328 x 7760	35-800	72db	0.6	2012
iXA-160	53.9 x 40.4 mm	CCD	60 MP, 16-bit	8984 x 6732	50-800	72db	0.7	2012
iXA-160 Achromatic	53.8 x 40.3 mm	CCD	60 MP, 16-bit	8964 x 6716	200–3200	72db	0.7	2012

=== Imaging software ===
Capture One originated as Phase One's in-house RAW image-processing software. It was first released as LightPhase Capture in 1998 and renamed Capture One in 2002. Beginning in 2003, the software expanded to support camera systems beyond those produced by Phase One and developed into a standalone imaging platform. Following Axcel's acquisition of Phase One in 2019, the software business was separated from Phase One and established as the separate company Capture One A/S. For additional information about the software and its product editions, see Capture One.

== Product releases (in chronological order) ==
- CB6x and FC70 - 1993
- PhotoPhase (+) - 1995/1996
- StudioKit - 1996
- PowerPhase - 1997
- LightPhase (BB00) - 1998 (Gen 1. Hasselblad V mount)
- LightPhase (BB01) - 1998/1999 (Gen 2. Hasselblad V mount)
- LightPhase (BB02) - 1999 (Gen 3. Hasselblad V mount)
- LightPhase (Mamiya and Contax 645 versions and BB03) - 1999
- PowerPhase FX - 2000
- H20 - 2001
- PowerPhase FX+ - 2002
- H5 and H10 6 MP (re-branded Lightphase) - 2002
- H10 (11 MP) - 2002
- H101 (H10 11 MP, Hasselblad H1 design) - 2002
- H25 - 2003
- P20 and P25 - 2004
- P21, P30, and P45 - 2005
- P20+, P21+, P25+, P30+, and P45+ - 2007
- Phase One 645AF - 2008
- P65+ - 2008
- Phase One 645DF - 2009
- P40+ - 2009
- IQ180, IQ160, IQ140 - 2011
- Phase One iXR and Phase One iXA - 2012
- Phase One 645DF+ - 2012
- IQ280, IQ260, IQ260 achromatic - 2013
- IQ250 - 2014
- Phase One iXU - 2014
- IQ150 - 2014
- Phase One XF May 2015 (645 camera body)
- IQ3 50MP, IQ3 60MP, IQ3 80MP - May 2015
- IQ3 100MP - January 2016
- IQ3 100MP Achromatic - April 2017
- Phase One iXG - August 2017
- IQ3 100MP Trichromatic - September 2017
- Phase One iXM - April 2018
- IQ4 150, IQ4 150 Achromatic, IQ4 100 Trichromatic - August 2018
- Phase One iXM-RS150F August 2018
- Phase One iXM-MV - February 2019
- Phase One XT - September 2019
- Phase One iXH - April 2020
- Phase One iXM-RS 280F - April 2020
- Phase One PAS880 / 880i - December 2020
- Phase One P3 Drone Payload - April 2021
- Phase One iXM GS120 - January 2022
- Phase One PAS280 / 280i - February 2022
- Phase One iXM-SP - May 2023
- Phase One XC - June 2023
- Phase One P5 - November 2023
- Phase One iXM-RC100 - July 2025
- Phase One iXM-RS 250F - October 2025
- Phase One iXM-FS130 - 2026 (aerial mapping camera for fixed-wing aircraft, capable of 1 cm GSD imaging)
- Phase One PAS TRANA - 2026 (modular aerial mapping system)
- Phase One iXM-RS250 - 2025 (247-megapixel aerial mapping camera)
- Phase One iXH 250MP - 2026 (247-megapixel camera system for cultural-heritage digitization; a single capture reaches nearly A0 size at 400 ppi)
