= Milan Milišić =

Yugoslav poet (1941–1991)

- Born: 6 July 1941; Dubrovnik, Independent State of Croatia
- Died: 5 October 1991 (aged 50); Dubrovnik, Croatia
- Occupations: Poet; writer; translator; journalist
- Children: 2

Milan Milišić (6 July 1941 – 5 October 1991) was a Yugoslav poet, translator, author and journalist from Dubrovnik. He wrote several volumes of poetry and also plays, essays, travel literature, a novel and translated, among others, J. R. R. Tolkien's The Hobbit, the poems of Robert Frost, and Ted Hughes into the Serbo-Croatian language.

== Biography ==
Milišić was born in Dubrovnik in the occupied Kingdom of Yugoslavia (now Croatia) to ethnic Serb parents. His father Risto was an owner of a fabrics store and came from Trebinje (Bosnia and Herzegovina), and his mother Olga (née Radulović) came from Sarajevo (now Bosnia and Herzegovina). He graduated from the University of Belgrade Faculty of Philology.

His family was stripped of their factory and other properties under the new post-war Communist authorities.

In 1967 Milišić and his wife moved to London, where they lived for three years. In this period he worked as a driver, started making ceramics, travelled extensively throughout Europe and published poetry. In 1970 the couple moved to Belgrade where they lived for a short period during which Milišić became a member of Association of Writers of Serbia.

He stood trial in 1985 because of his essay Život za slobodu which presented the event in which the Yugoslav Partisans shot Mirko Šuštar and 50 other notable citizens of Dubrovnik, under the accusation that they aided Nazi Germany, which was never proven. Milišić had his passport revoked by the Yugoslav regime and was declared persona non grata. Many intellectuals and writers from Serbia and Croatia supported his cause. After his passport was returned, Milišić was able to travel to the United States as a poet-in-residence at New York University and Amherst College. He was also a member of the Croatian Writers Society and PEN.

== Personal life ==
From 1966 to 1976, he was married to a Briton, Mary Martin, with whom he translated The Hobbit. He had two sons, Oleg Milišić, a press secretary for the High Representative for Bosnia and Herzegovina, and Roman Milišić. He later married painter Jelena Trpković. His close friends included writers Danilo Kiš, Zoran Stanojević, and Predrag Čudić. Composer Isidora Žebeljan wrote in 2012 a musical piece for Mezzo-Soprano and String Quartet on the verses of Milišić with the title When God Created Dubrovnik. The world première took place during the City of London Festival in 2013, performed by Lore Lixenberg and Brodsky Quartet. This composition is recorded for Chandos Records.

== Death and legacy ==
Milišić died on 5 October 1991, when a Yugoslav People's Army shell struck his kitchen in the first days of the Siege of Dubrovnik. He was among the first civilian casualties of the siege. His poetry and travel writing, some previously unpublished, some repackaged, has continued to be published in Croatia, Bosnia and Herzegovina, and Serbia, since his death.

== Works ==
- Volele su me dve sestre, skupa (Ekavian, 1970)
- Koga nema (1972)
- Hobit (translator, 1975)
- Živjela naša udovica (1977)
- Zgrad (1977)
- Having A Good Time (1981)
- Mačka na smeću (1984)
- Tumaralo (1985)
- Vrt bez dobi (1986)
- Mačka na smeću (1987)
- Stains (Croatia, 1993)
- Treperenje (Croatia, 1994)
- Nastrana vrana (Gr, 1996)
- Stvaranje Dubrovnik (Bosnia, 1996)
- Robert Frost, Selected Poems (Belgrade, 1996)
- Treperenje (Serbia, 1997)
- Mrtvo zvono (Croatia, 1997)
- Otoci (Croatia, 1997)
- Putopisi (Bosnia, 1997)
- Hommage Milišiću (Serbia, 2005)
- Dubrovačka zrcala (Croatia, 2007)
- Kapetanova kći (Serbia, 2011)
