= Backrest =

Backrest or back-rest may refer to:

- Part of a chair, sofa, Bench or other such furniture used for resting one's back
- Fishing rod backrest
- Sissy bar, a backrest on a motorcycle
