= Cambo camera =

Dutch camera manufacturer

Cambo BV is a manufacturer of high quality, technical and view cameras based in Kampen, the Netherlands, and has the distinction of being the first studio camera manufacturer to produce an all-metal large format camera.

== History ==
The company was founded by Roelof Bok in 1946 in Hengelo, the Netherlands. At the time the company was called Technica Hengelo. Trying to export the first produced camera 'Super Techna', a confusion with Linhof Technica made it necessary to rethink the company's name to Cambo (CAMera BOk) The company moved to Kampen in 1965. In 1968, Cambo obtained worldwide success by developing the Multishot camera. This camera fitted with four lenses and hence is able to take four pictures at a time. Since several years Cambo has expanded their product range into the market for video supports.

== Current technical and view cameras ==
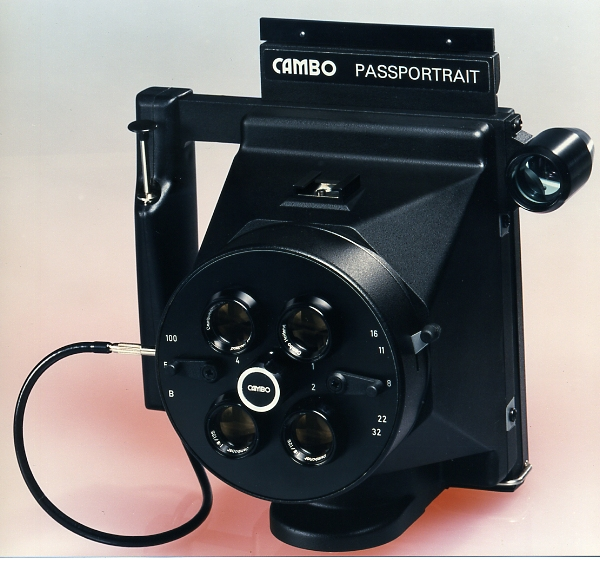
Cambo Multishot 40

=== Wide RS Series ===
The Wide RS fladbed cameras have been designed for digital photography with high-end digital backs and is the camera of choice for architecture, landscape and automotive photography. They can be used with the complete line of modern Rodenstock HR Digaron-S and HR Digaron-W lenses, and with a vast choice of existing Schneider Digitar lenses.

- WRS-5000
- WRS-1600
- WRS-1250
- WRC-490/-491
- WRC-400

=== Actus Mini View Cameras ===
- Actus-B
- Actus-DB2
- Actus-G
- Actus-G990D/-G991D

=== Actus View Cameras ===
- Actus MV
- Actus XL-35
- Actus XL-DB

=== Ultima Series ===
- Ultima 45
