= Back Bay (disambiguation) =

Back Bay is a neighborhood of Boston, Massachusetts.

Back Bay may also refer to:

== Places ==
- Back Bay (Antarctica)
- Back Bay (MBTA station), an MBTA train station in Back Bay, Boston, Massachusetts, U.S.
- Back Bay (Mumbai), India
- Back Bay, New Brunswick, Canada
- Back Bay, a bay of Biloxi, Mississippi, U.S.
- Back Bay Fens, a park that is part of the Emerald Necklace in Boston, Massachusetts, U.S.
- Back Bay National Wildlife Refuge, Virginia
- Back Bay, Newport Beach, California
- Back Bay, Tobago

== Other uses ==
- Back Bay Publishing, a corporation operated by Boston University students
