= Bauk (field) =

The balk, back, bauk (Lowland Scots), leum-iochd or bailc/bac (Scottish Gaelic) was a strip of a corn field left fallow. The fear of being left with the last sheaf of the harvest called the cailleach (kulyach etc.) or gobhar bhacach (the goat of the balk) always led to an exciting competition among the reapers in the last field. The reaper who came on a leum-iochd would of course be glad to have so much less to cut.

An old saying was "better a balk in autumn, than a sheaf the more." Rev. Michie of Dinnet heard the above saying in a different sense in the Highlands of Aberdeenshire, viz. that in lands allotted on the run-rig system, the crofter who got a balk attached to his rig was considered luckier than his neighbour with a somewhat larger rig, because, but without the balk, the grass of which was of more than compensating value, especially for fodder etc.

In Heart of Midlothian (1818) by Walter Scott, he glosses it as "an unploughed ridge of land interposed among the corn"

Gregor's Folk-lore of North East Scotland (1881) says:

"Even in the cultivated parts of larger size there was no regularity. They were twisted, bent like a bow, zig-zag, of all shapes, and cut up by 'baaks', into which were gathered stones and such weeds as were taken from the portion under crop."

Bauks were also used as boundaries between neighbours' land. George Robertson's General view of Agriculture in Perth (1799) says:

"Large slices of land are left unploughed, as boundaries between the alternate ridges of neighbours, in the same plough-gate; which are a perpetual nursery of weeds, besides the loss of so much land lying waste. These earthern boundaries ... are wearing fast out, in this country."

This indicates that they were well in decline in parts of Lowland Scotland in the late 18th century. However, the word is recorded in the 1920s north east Scotland, as referring to a path between fields, obviously a residual use with a slightly different meaning.

== See also ==
- Lazy bed
- run rig
