= Digital camera back =

Digital image sensor that attaches to the back of a film camera

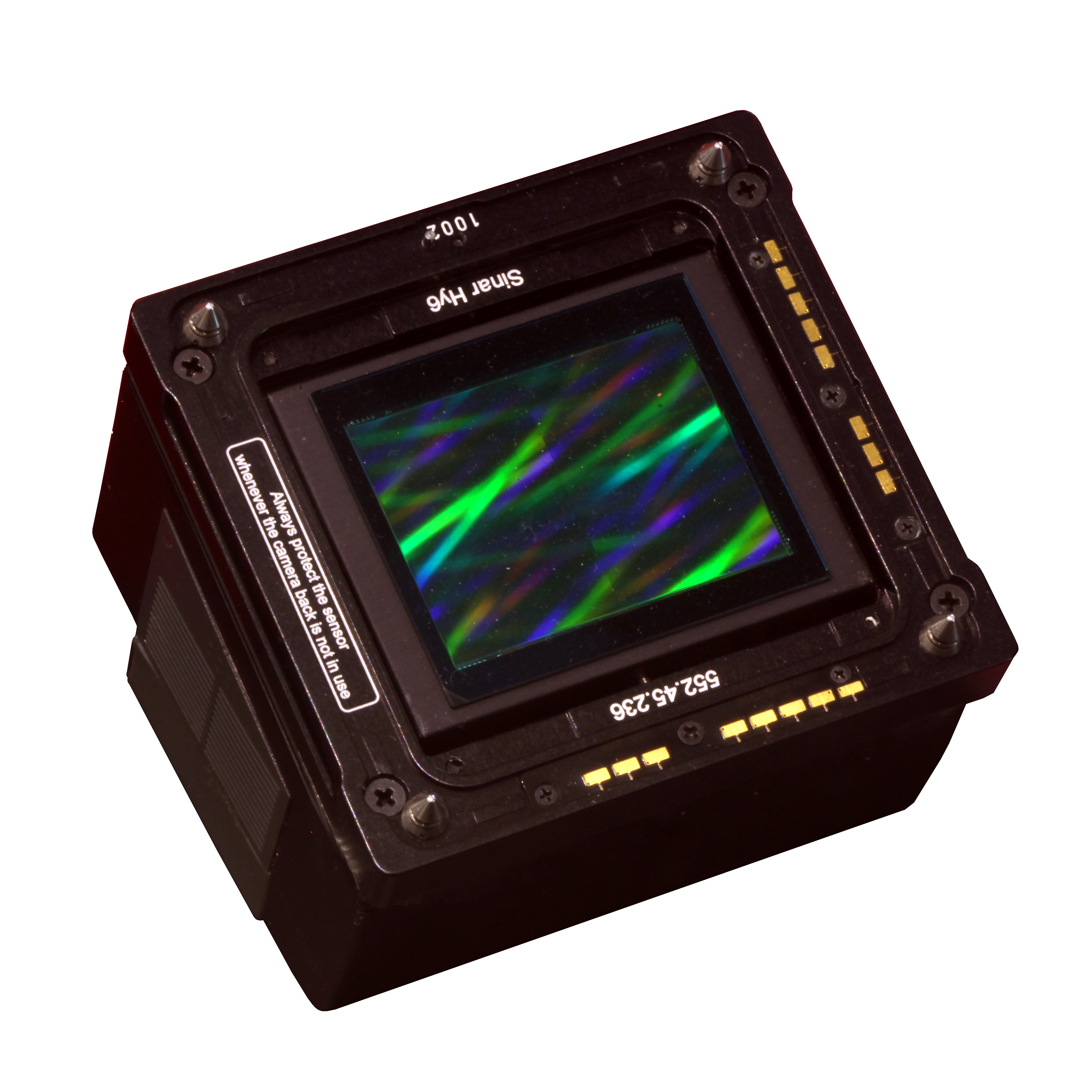
Sinar eVolution 75 digital camera back sensor, mountable on a select range of medium-format camera brands, 2007, 33 megapixels, price c. €15,000

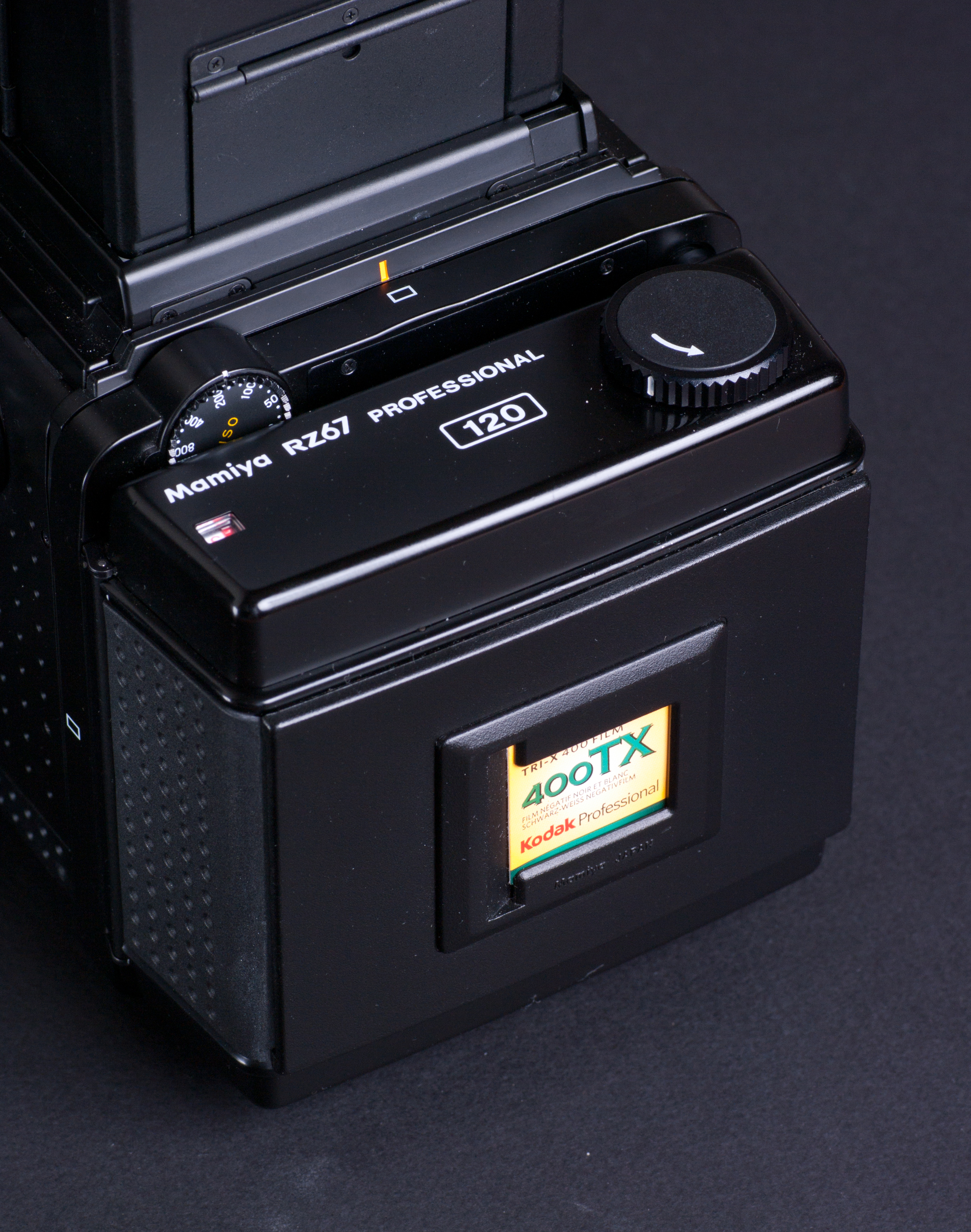
Traditional negative 120 film camera back, attached to a Mamiya RZ67 Professional medium-format camera

A digital camera back is a device that attaches to the back of a camera in place of the traditional negative film holder and contains an electronic image sensor. This allows cameras that were designed to use film to take digital photographs. These camera backs are generally expensive by consumer standards (US$5,000 and up) and are primarily built to be attached on medium- and large-format cameras used by professional photographers.

== Types ==
Two sensor back types are commonly used: single shot back (non-scanning) and scan back.

Some backs, primarily older ones, require multiple exposures to capture an image; generally one each for red, green, and blue. These are called multi-shot or 3-shot backs. As technology advanced single-shot backs became more practical; by 2008 most backs manufactured were single-shot.

Early backs had to be used tethered by a cable to a controlling computer that would store the images they took. Newer models added the ability to store the photos inside the back itself, and added displays so that the picture could be viewed on the back without requiring a separate computer. Virtually all backs can still be operated in tethered fashion, which allows convenient previewing of images on a large monitor by several people at the same time, sophisticated control of camera functions, and convenient storage for the large image files produced.

Modern high resolution backs that push the limits of data storage and transfer technology still are able to make use of a tethered configuration to offload gigabytes of data to cheaper external storage mediums such as hard drives, instead of the more expensive integrated flash memory.

=== Single shot back ===
Non-scanning backs have a sensor similar to that used in most other digital cameras, a square or rectangular array of pixels. Backs are generally assumed to be non-scanning unless specified to be a scan back.

=== Scan back ===
Scanning backs operate more like an image scanner for paper: they have a linear array of sensors that is moved across the image area to scan the image one row of pixels at a time. Scanning backs are primarily used in large format view cameras.

== History ==
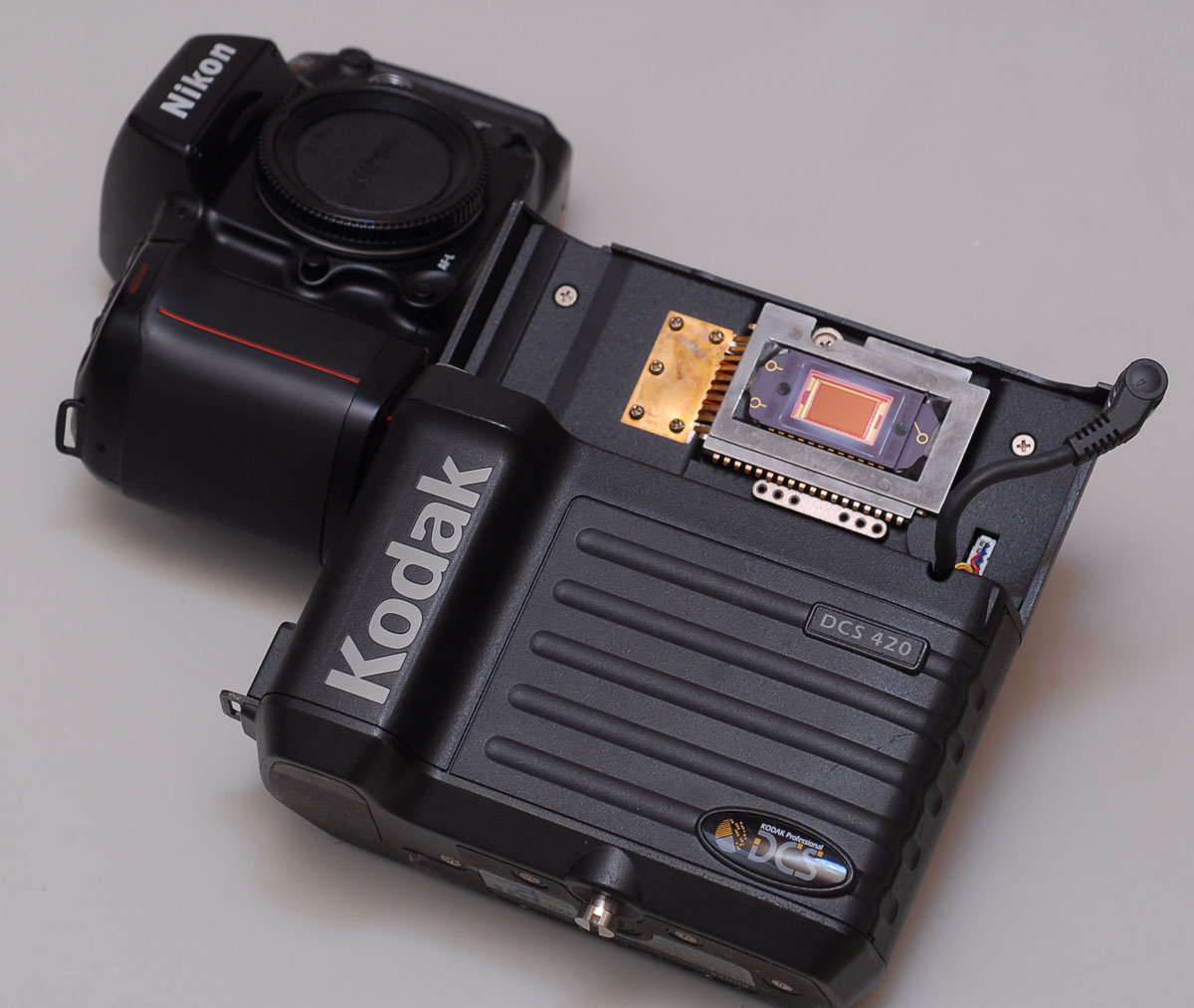
Kodak DCS420 digital camera, consisting of a modified Nikon N90s body (left) and a digital back (right) shown here separated.

The first commercial digital camera back was introduced by Leaf (now part of Phase One) in 1991. (Note: The world first Digital back is Nikon NASA F4 and it's not for commercial) The Leaf DCBI (Digital Camera Back I), nicknamed "The Brick", offered resolution of 4 megapixels (MP) in a 2048 × 2048 pixel format. The same CCD was used by Sinar in its equivalent sinarback. In 1994 Leaf introduced an improved model, the DCBII, which included a live-video view, and in 1998 they introduced the 6 MP Volare.

A complete camera system was constructed using the Sinar view camera system with a Sinarcam 1 shutter system which provided control of the live image, and an adapter plate was made to use the backs with Hasselblad cameras. Driver software generally required the use of an Apple Macintosh to operate the cameras.

These systems were complex and expensive. They used custom controller cards (known as the "SCSI taxi"), and were 3-shot backs; a colored filter wheel inside the back rotated to take red, green, and blue exposures.

=== Competition and evolution ===
Competition soon came to the new industry.

MegaVision in 1992 introduced their T2 back, which was a similar product; it also was a 3-shot unit with a 4 MP square sensor. MegaVision had been making digital photography equipment based on video technology since 1984, and the T2 had live video preview.

Phase One was founded in 1993, and by 1994 was selling their StudioKit scanning backs. In 1998 Phase One launched the Lightphase. which was the first one-shot back that could compete with film in terms of quality. Resolution was 6 MP and the physical size of the CCD was full-frame 35 mm, however the back was designed to be used on Hasselblad 500-series cameras.

Other early industry entrants included Jenoptik who produced products in cooperation with Sinar, Dicomed (a scanning back maker which closed in 1999), Better Light (the most prominent scanning back maker), and Kigamo.

By 2003, Leaf had an 11 MP model, the Valeo, and Jenoptik/Sinar had the 11 MP Sinarback 43. several vendors had 16 MP models; Kodak produced the US$15,000 16 MP Pro Back Plus using their own CCD, Imacon made the ixpress 96, Phase One had their H20 and Sinar continued its camera back development from the 22, 23h, 43h and issued the 44H which when mounted on a macroscan unit delivered an image of over 1 GB in size with live image focussing using the Sinarcam shutter system.

As of 2014 Phase One had a large market share with their own camera manufacturing and the IQ series digital backs that offer 80, 60.5 and 40MP resolution respectively. IQ180 and IQ160 both capture in full-frame 645 format.

In 2019, Phase One launched its IQ4 series of digital camera backs at 100MP to 150MP resolution (included with both the Phase One XF IQ4 150MP Camera (MSRP $51,990 without lens, 1 fps, DSLR) and the Phase One XT IQ4 150MP Camera (MSRP $56,990 without lens, 1 fps, mirrorless)), with the 150MP generating 120.26 x 90.19 cm (47.35" x 35.5") 16-bit color images at 300dpi.

In 2025, a variety of lower-cost medium format digital cameras were available in the 50 to 100MP resolution range. Available 100MP cameras included the FujiFilm GFX 100 II (MSRP $7,499 without lens, 8K video at 30p/4K video at 60p), the FujiFilm GFX 100S (MSRP $5,999 without lens, 4K video at 30p), the FujiFilm GFX 100S II (MSRP $4,999 without lens, 8 fps with autofocus, 4K video at 30p) and the Hasselblad X2D II 100C (MSRP $7,399 including a XCD 75mm f/3.4 lens; no video capability).

=== Mergers and partnerships ===
During the first decade of the twenty-first century the digital back market began to change and consolidate quickly. One trend was the displacement of medium-format film cameras were by digital single-lens reflex cameras based on smaller, 35 mm film cameras, which can offer high-quality results with no more expense than medium-format film gear. At the same time digital workflow was increasingly easy. This is leading to the development of all-digital medium-format cameras which do not need separate digital backs.

Bronica and Contax, formerly two of the largest medium-format camera makers, went out of business. Fuji ceased production of their 680 medium-format film cameras. Mamiya crossed the product line divide in 2004, announcing a medium-format digital camera, the Mamiya ZD. The imaging technology used in this camera is also available as a separate digital back, the ZD Back, which can be used with Mamiya's film cameras. Shortly after the product was announced, the company was sold. Pentax, for whose cameras digital backs are not available, sells a medium-format digital camera.

Another trend is the release of new camera systems designed to tightly integrate with digital backs; this provides users with the ability to use film, but is easier to use for digital work than a film camera with a less-integrated accessory digital back.

Under pressure from digital camera back manufacturers, long-established medium-format SLR manufacturer Hasselblad eventually merged with back maker Imacon under the Hasselblad name. The post-merger Hasselblad worked with Fuji to develop a new line of cameras (Hasselblad's first in over 50 years) designed to closely integrate with digital backs, particularly the former Imacon models. This meant that Shriro (owner of Hasselblad/Imacon) and Fuji could squeeze out other back makers, sending those manufacturers (and the remaining medium-format manufacturers) seeking their own partnerships.

Mamiya announced a partnership with Phase One, which resulted in Phase One buying a major stake in Mamiya. Jenoptik commissioned Rollei to work with Sinar to develop their own tightly integrated platform, the Hy6. The Hy6 was also marketed by Leaf under their name and using their backs. The Sinar HY6 keeps the unique facilities of the rotating camera back and live image functionality.

During this process, several product lines of digital backs were discontinued. Kodak stopped making their own backs in 2004, shortly before purchasing Leaf. Fuji had their own line of backs, but certainly only one product line will be produced by Fuji and Hasselblad together leaving the Leica/Sinar group as the only European digital medium-format and view camera manufacturers.

Sinar is now a subsidiary of Leica and are continuing developments of high technology digitisation with more spectrally accurate systems and optional image size output from a fixed sized cameraback for increased speed

=== Hardware evolution ===
The early digital camera back market was dominated by scanning, rather than single-shot, models. Since it is much easier to manufacture a high-quality linear (one-dimensional) CCD array that has only a few thousand pixels than a two-dimensional CCD matrix that has millions, very high-resolution scanning CCD camera backs were available much earlier than their CCD matrix counterparts. For example, camera backs with a 7,000-pixel linear resolution—capable of scanning to relatively slowly produce pictures of about 40 MP—were available in the mid-1990s.

Many earlier multi-shot backs could natively capture only grayscale images; color images were created by scanning three times through red, green, and blue filters which rotated into place.

Early digital camera backs created more data than could be stored on the relatively small storage devices of the time that could be built into them, and had to be connected (tethered) to a computer during capture.

Later, one-shot digital backs, which can work at all shutter speeds even on motorized medium-format cameras, were produced. Images are stored on fast high-capacity plug-in memory cards, making tethering to a computer unnecessary so that the backs could be used wherever film can be used.

== Advantages and disadvantages ==
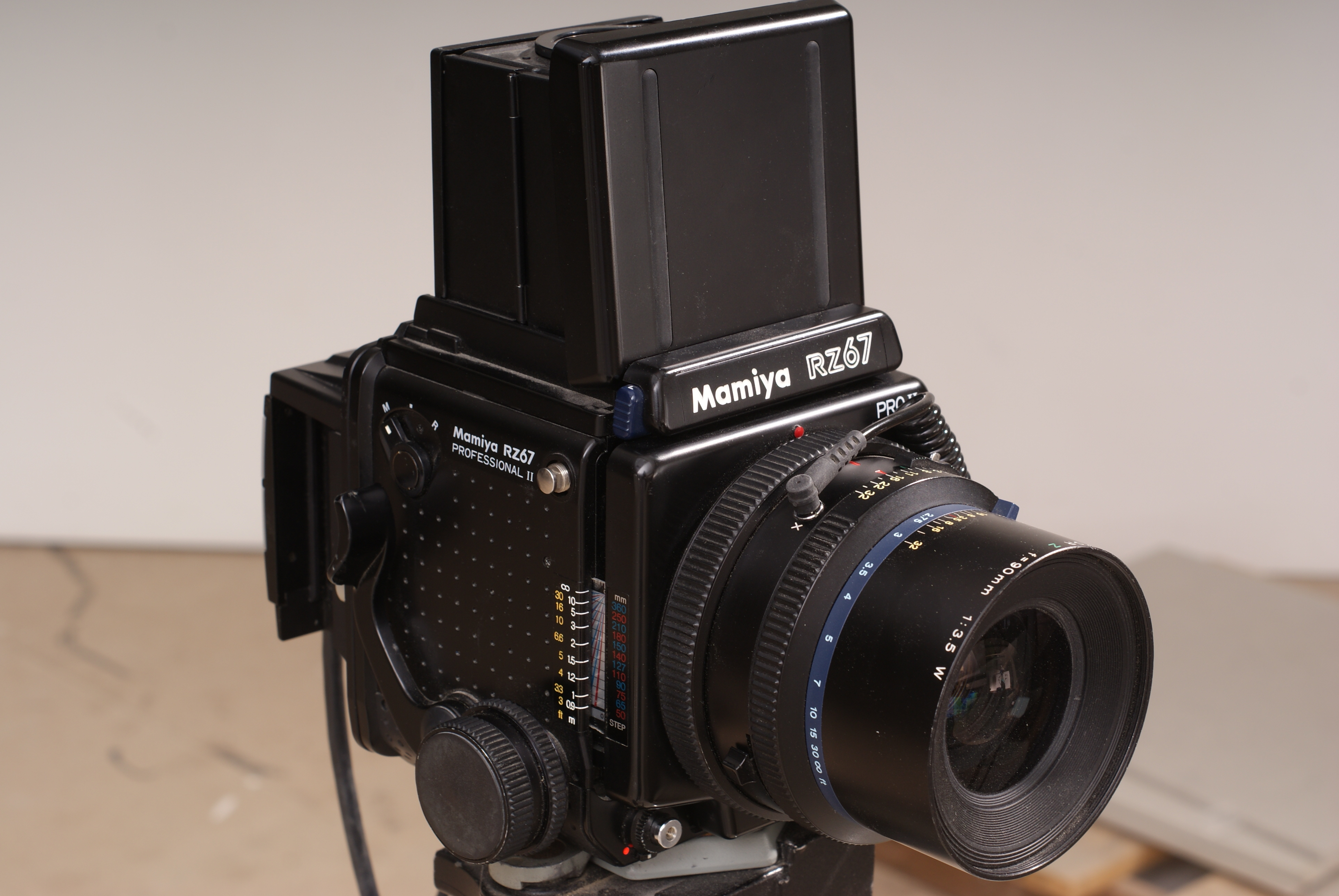
Mamiya RZ Professional II (Film camera) and Phase one Digital back

While dedicated digital cameras suitable for advanced use are available, there are advantages in being able to use a film camera to take digital photographs. A single camera can be used for both film and digital photography. Cameras with features not available on digital cameras (e.g., view cameras) can be used to make digital images.

Digital backs which are used in place of the normal film back are available for most medium and all large-format cameras with adaptors which can allow the same digital camera back to be used with several different cameras, allowing a photographer to choose a body/lens combination best suited for each application rather than using a body/lens system which represents a compromise of design to fit a variety of applications.

Users with large investments in existing camera equipment can convert it to digital use, both saving money and allowing them to continue to use their preferred and familiar tools.

Exposures longer than several minutes are obscured by image noise when captured with a 35 mm digital SLR, but exposures of up to about an hour at room temperature and as long as 17 hours in extremely cold situations can remain noise-free on a digital camera back. In practice a 30-second exposure on a Sinar 75 evolution with a built-in fan-assisted Peltier-cooled CCD represents the state of the art for practical purposes.

The resolution of digital camera backs (in 2017, up to 101 megapixels, IQ3 100) is higher than any fixed sensor digital camera (in 2017, up to 51 megapixels, Hasselblad X1D). (Note: Sigma SD1 MERRILL is 46mp, but the Foveon X3 sensor is the different criterion to about resolution, that's why SD1 excepted) and captures more detail per pixel due to the omission of an anti-aliasing filter. Each pixel is also able to capture more dynamic range due to higher quality electronics and larger pixel pitch. The use of active cooling systems such as internal fans and Peltier effect electric cooling systems also contributes to image quality. The Sinar eXact creates images in excess of 1 GB in multi-shot mode from a 49 MP sensor.

=== Alternatives ===
There are alternative ways to create a high-resolution digital image without a digital back.

==== Scanning film ====
If a high-resolution digital image is required, it can be achieved inexpensively without the use of a digital back by taking a large-format photograph on film and scanning the result; for best results a high-quality drum scanner is required. This can be used to create a much larger very high resolution computer file than is feasible with a single-shot digital back, and quality is high, though it has been argued that the resolution is not much better than a digitally photographed image.

A detailed comparison in 2006 by a professional photographer of drum-scanned 10 × 12.5 cm (4 × 5″) images and digital 39-megapixel images on a medium-format camera found resolution very similar, with the scanned images slightly better. Color accuracy was not compared as digital profiles for the digital back were not available, but the author was of the considered opinion that the digital camera would ultimately be more accurate. For sustained professional use the apparent cost advantage of scanning film was very much reduced on careful analysis; including expensive 10 × 12.5 cm (4 × 5″) film and processing and the cost of use of a drum scanner brought the projected cost over three years to about 80% of the cost of a digital back at the time. The digital back also had the advantage that the incremental cost of taking huge numbers of exposures was nil, while each 10 × 12.5 cm (4 × 5″) photograph cost over US$3. Both the scanned and the 39-megapixel images were noticeably better than images with a 22-megapixel back.

An actual flatbed image scanner can be used as a camera back if fast operation and short exposures are not required.

==== Stitching ====
Another alternative is to take multiple smaller pictures and then stitch them together via image stitching. In this way very high-resolution images can be produced from a low-resolution sensor. This can be done with a smaller digital camera, such as a DSLR, and stitching sliding back adapters are available for large-format cameras. The process can be lengthy, and is unsuited for moving subjects. There are also non-sliding options for stitching images together in various patterns using micro stepping of the image sensor and taking advantage of the gap between active pixel areas on the digital sensors. This stitching method is used to also give overlaid red green and blue pixel recording as well as increased resolution.

== Technical features ==
=== Typical backs ===
By 2006 CCD matrix camera backs of 39 megapixels were available. using the Kodak CCD and 33-megapixel Dalsa CCD in the Sinar 75 and in the Leaf Aptus 75 (6726 × 5040 pixels, with 7.2-micrometre-wide pixels). By 2008 several camera manufactures were developing larger camera backs based on the Kodak 50-megapixel CCD. Scanning backs are a narrower niche, used only for the highest-quality images with large-format cameras. Sinar continued their development of the step and repeat system of extending the CCD capabilities (macroscanning) with the arTec camera which creates a panoramic image with stitching technology.

In addition to increased resolution, larger image sensors are becoming available; Kodak has produced a 50-megapixel CCD which is 49.1 × 36.85 mm (1.93 × 1.45″), approaching the size of a frame of 120 film (60 × 45 mm) and is twice the area of a 35 mm frame (36 × 24 mm), and over seventy times the area of the typical 1/1.8″ (7.2 × 5.3 mm) sensor size used in point-and-shoot pocket cameras. Large-area CCDs are used by the several manufacturers of high-resolution photographic equipment. Other recent innovations are built-in LCD viewing screens and the inclusion of all processing within the camera back, with output in open DNG file format, as in the Sinar 65.

The Pentacon Scan 7000 scanner camera was introduced at the photokina 2010 show in Cologne, Germany. Its resolution is 20,000 × 20,000 pixels (400 megapixels) in 48-bit color depth, and it is supplied with the SilverFast Archive Suite. One scanned exposure at this high image resolution might take 2 to 4 minutes.
