= Focal-plane shutter =

Mechanism that controls the exposure time in cameras

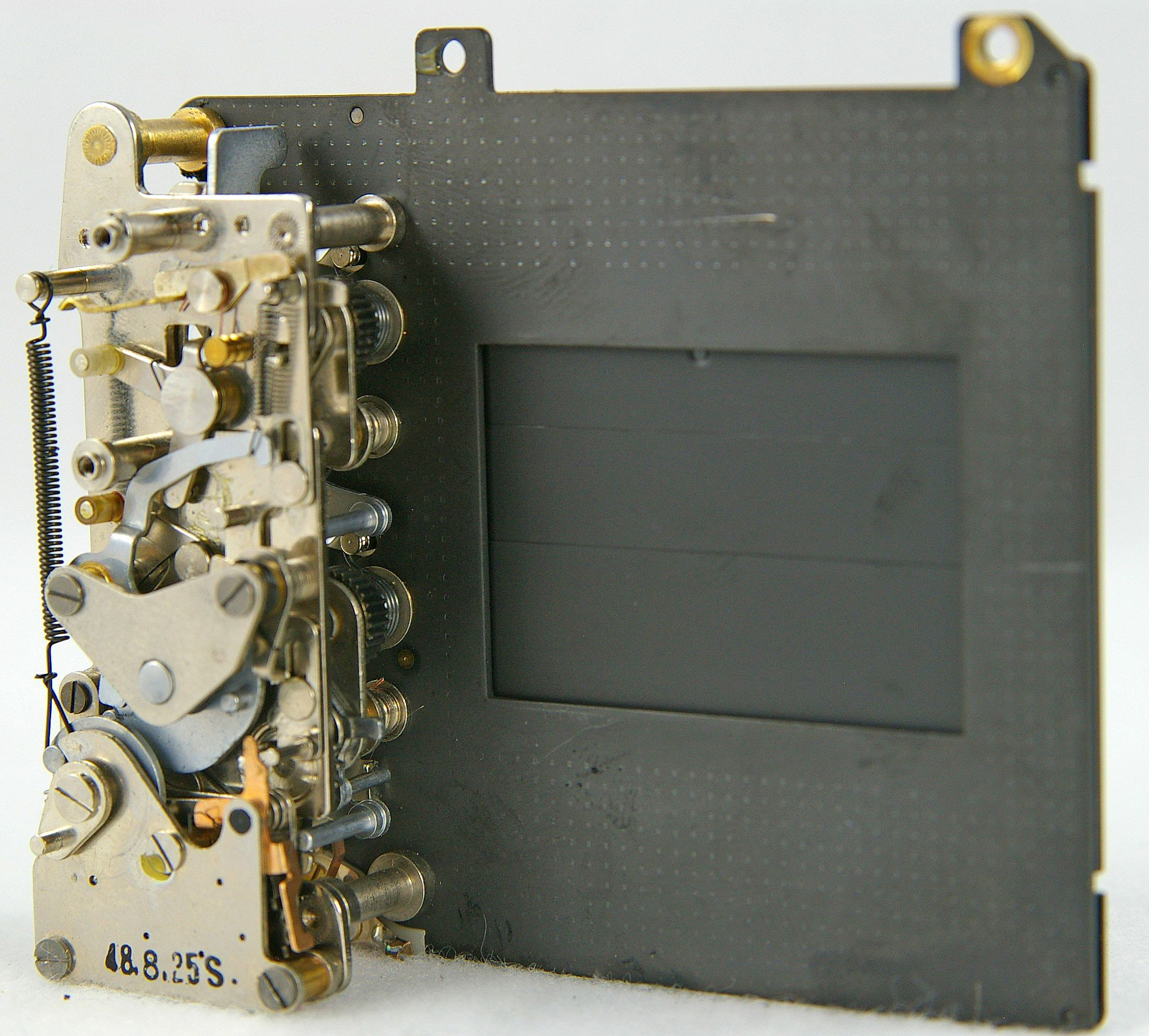
A focal-plane shutter. The metal shutter blades travel vertically.

In camera design, a focal-plane shutter (FPS) is a type of photographic shutter that is positioned immediately in front of the focal plane of the camera, that is, right in front of the photographic film or image sensor.

== Two-curtain shutters ==
The traditional type of focal-plane shutter in 35 mm cameras, pioneered by Leitz for use in its Leica cameras, uses two shutter curtains, made of opaque rubberised fabric, that run horizontally across the film plane. For slower shutter speeds, the first curtain opens (usually) from right to left, and after the required time with the shutter open, the second curtain closes the aperture in the same direction. When the shutter is cocked again the shutter curtains are overlapped and moved back to their starting positions, ready to be released.

=== Focal-plane shutter at low speed ===
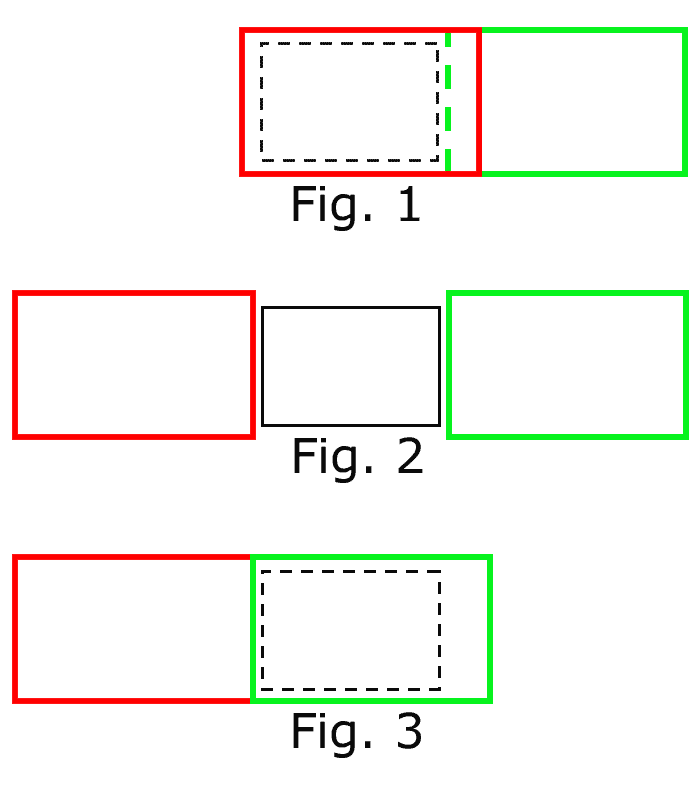
Focal-plane shutter, low speed

Figure 1: The black rectangle represents the frame aperture through which the exposure is made. It is currently covered by the first shutter curtain, shown in red. The second shutter curtain shown in green is on the right side.

Figure 2: The first shutter curtain moves fully to the left allowing the exposure to be made. At this point, the flash is made to fire if one is attached and ready to do so.

Figure 3: After the required amount of exposure, the second shutter curtain moves to the left to cover the frame aperture. When the shutter is recocked the shutter curtains are wound back to the right-hand side ready for the next exposure.

This is a graphical representation only; the actual mechanisms are much more complex. For example, the shutter curtains actually roll on and off spools at either side of the frame aperture so as to use as little space as possible.

Faster shutter speeds are achieved by the second curtain closing before the first one has fully opened; this results in a vertical slit that travels horizontally across the film. Faster shutter speeds simply require a narrower slit, as the speed of travel of the shutter curtains is not normally varied.

=== Focal-plane shutter at high speed ===
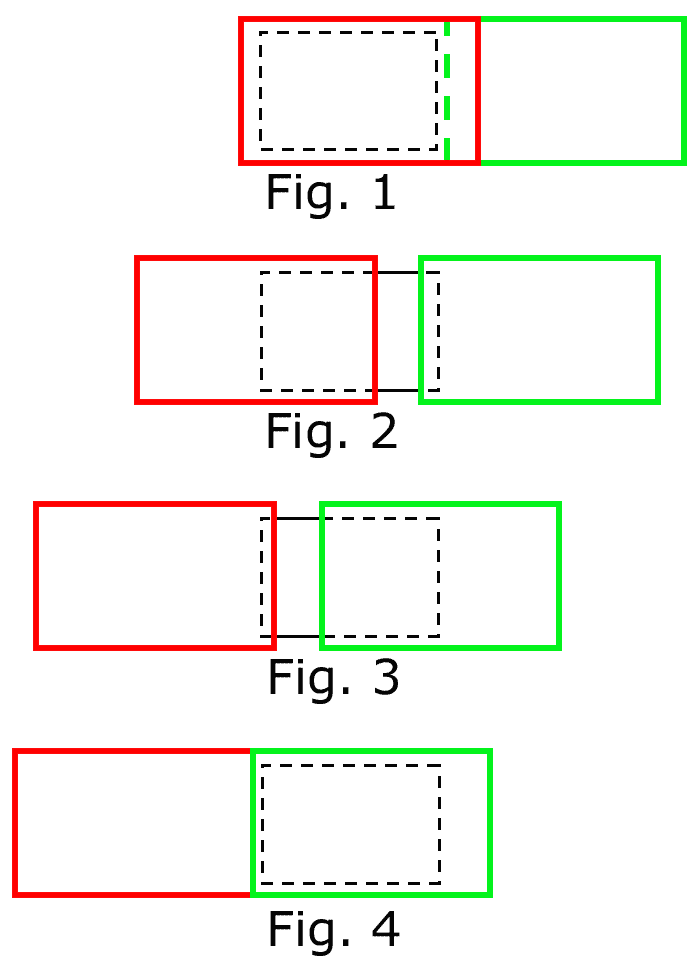
Focal-plane shutter, high speed

Figure 1: The black rectangle represents the frame aperture through which the exposure is made. It is currently covered by the first shutter curtain, shown in red. The second shutter curtain shown in green is on the right side.

Figure 2: The first shutter curtain begins to move to the left allowing the exposure to be made. Because the exposure requires a very fast shutter speed, the second curtain begins to move across at a set distance from the first one.

Figure 3: The first shutter curtain continues to travel across the frame aperture followed by the second curtain. It would be pointless to use an electronic flash with this shutter speed as the short duration flash would expose only a very small amount of the frame as the rest is covered by either the first or second shutter curtain.

Figure 4: The first shutter curtain finishes moving, followed closely by the second curtain which is now covering the frame aperture completely. When the shutter is recocked both shutter curtains are wound back to the right-hand side ready for the next exposure.

== Vertical-travel shutters ==
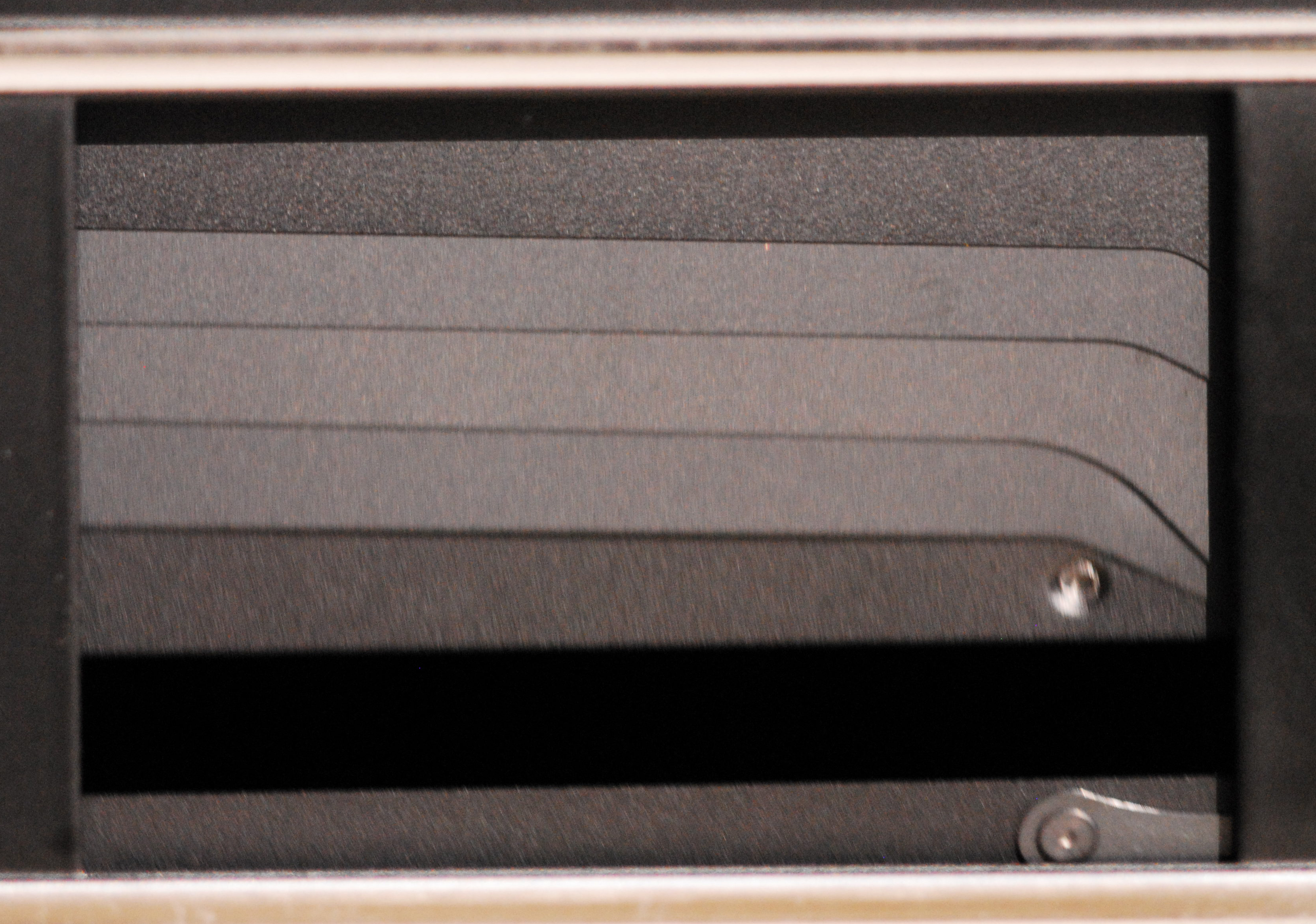
Vertical-travel focal-plane shutter firing at 1/500 of a second—the gap between the curtains is clearly visible near the bottom.

Most modern 35 mm and digital SLR cameras now use vertical travel metal blade shutters. These work in the same way as the horizontal shutters, with a shorter distance for the shutter blades to travel, only 24 mm as opposed to 36 mm.

== Features ==
Focal-plane shutters can be built into the body of a camera that accepts interchangeable lenses, eliminating the need for each lens to have a central shutter built into it. Their fastest speeds are either 1/4000 second, 1/8000 second, or 1/12000 second; much higher than the 1/500 second of the typical leaf shutter.

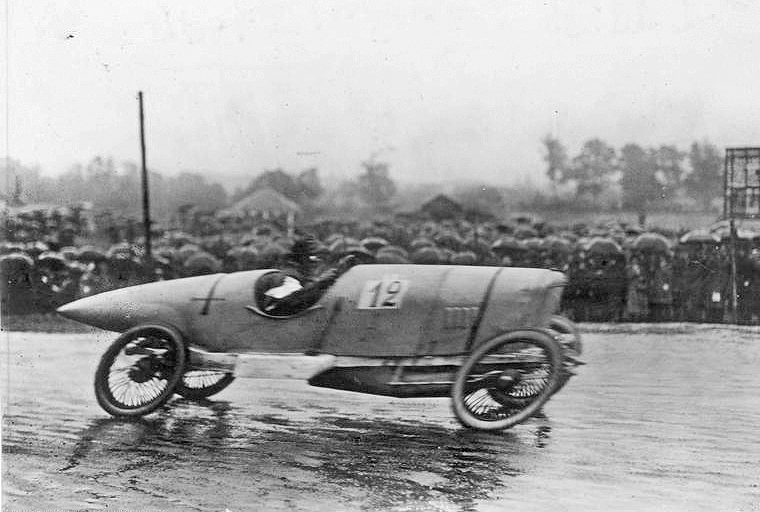
A "leaning" 1920s Dixi race car. The distortion is caused by a shutter wiping downward in the focal plane (upward in the scene).

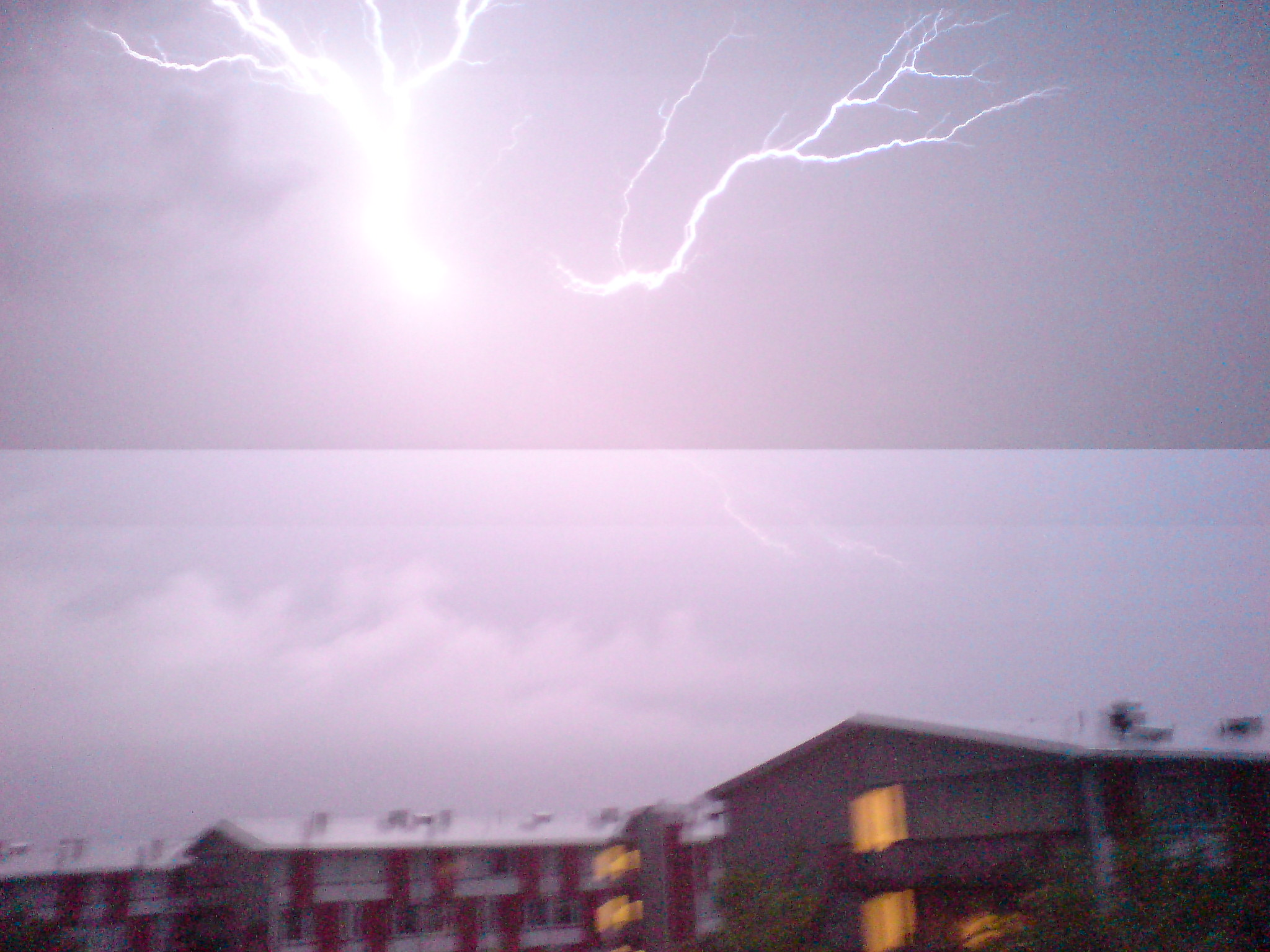
Two sections of the frame are exposed differently due to a lightning strike that occurred during the exposure. A similar effect occurs if an electronic flash is used when the shutter is set faster than X-sync.

While the concept of a travelling slit shutter is simple, a modern FP shutter is a computerised microsecond accurate timer, governing sub-gram masses of exotic materials, subjected to hundreds of gs acceleration, moving with micron precision, choreographed with other camera systems for 100,000+ cycles. This is why FP shutters are seldom seen in compact or point-and-shoot cameras. In addition, the typical focal-plane shutter has flash synchronization speeds that are slower than the typical leaf shutter's 1/500 s, because the first curtain has to open fully and the second curtain must not start to close until the flash has fired. In other words, the very narrow slits of fast speeds will not be properly flash exposed.

The fastest X-sync speed on a 35 mm camera is traditionally 1/60 s for horizontal Leica-type FP shutters and 1/125 s for vertical Square-type FP shutters.

=== Rolling shutter ===
Focal-plane shutters may also produce image distortion of very fast-moving objects or when panned rapidly, as described in the Rolling shutter article. A large relative difference between a slow wipe speed and a narrow curtain slit results in distortion because one side of the frame is exposed at a noticeably later instant than the other and the object's interim movement is imaged.

For a horizontal Leica-type FP shutter, the image is stretched if the object moves in the same direction as the shutter curtains, and compressed if travelling in the opposite direction of them. For a downward-firing vertical Square-type FP shutter, the top of the image leans forward.

== Electro-optical shutters ==
Instead of using relatively slow-moving mechanical shutter curtains, electro-optic devices such as Pockels cells can be employed as shutters. While not commonly used, they avoid the problems associated with travelling-curtain shutters such as flash synchronisation limitations and image distortions when the object is moving.

== Rotary focal-plane shutter ==
Besides the horizontal Leica and vertical Square FP shutters, other types of FP shutters exist. The most prominent is the rotary or sector FP shutter. The rotary disc shutter is common in film and movie cameras, but rare in still cameras. These spin a round metal plate with a sector cutout in front of the film. In theory, rotary shutters can control their speeds by narrowing or widening the sector cutout (by using two overlapping plates and varying the overlap) and/or by spinning the plate faster or slower. However, most cameras' rotary shutters have fixed cutouts and can be varied in their spinning speed. The Olympus Pen F and Pen FT (1963 and 1966, both from Japan) half-frame 35 mm SLRs spun a semicircular titanium plate to 1/500 s.

Semicircular rotary shutters have unlimited X-sync speed, but all rotary FP shutters have the bulk required for the plate spin. The Univex Mercury (1938, US) half-frame 35 mm camera had a very large dome protruding out the top of the main body to accommodate its 1/1000 s rotary shutter. They also produce unusual distortion at very high speed because of the angular sweep of the exposure wipe. Bulk can be reduced by substituting blade sheaves for the plate, but then the rotary FP shutter essentially becomes a regular bladed FP shutter.

== Revolving drum focal-plane shutter ==
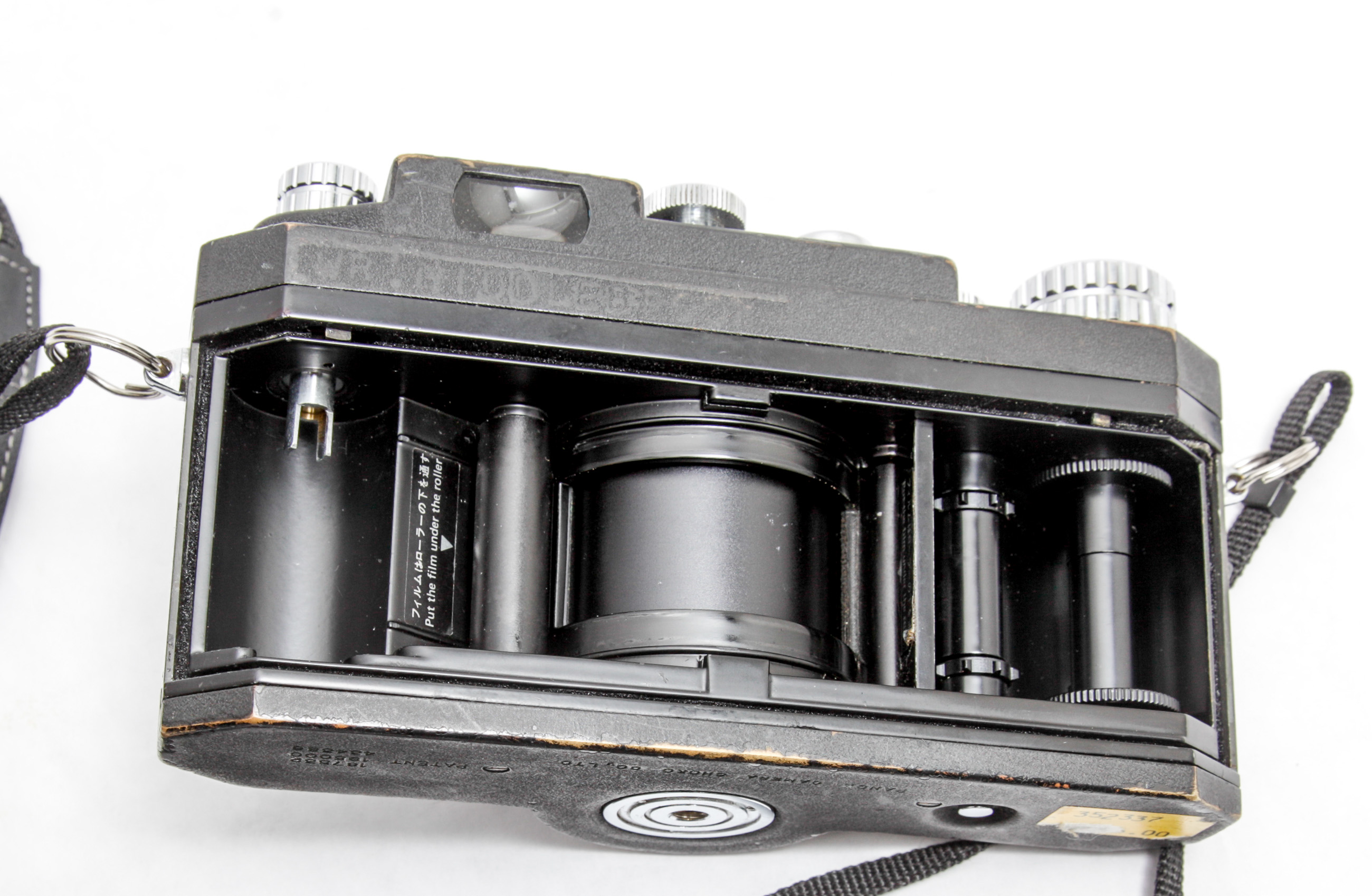
Back inside view of Widelux F7 panoramic camera, where the slit shutter goes by the film

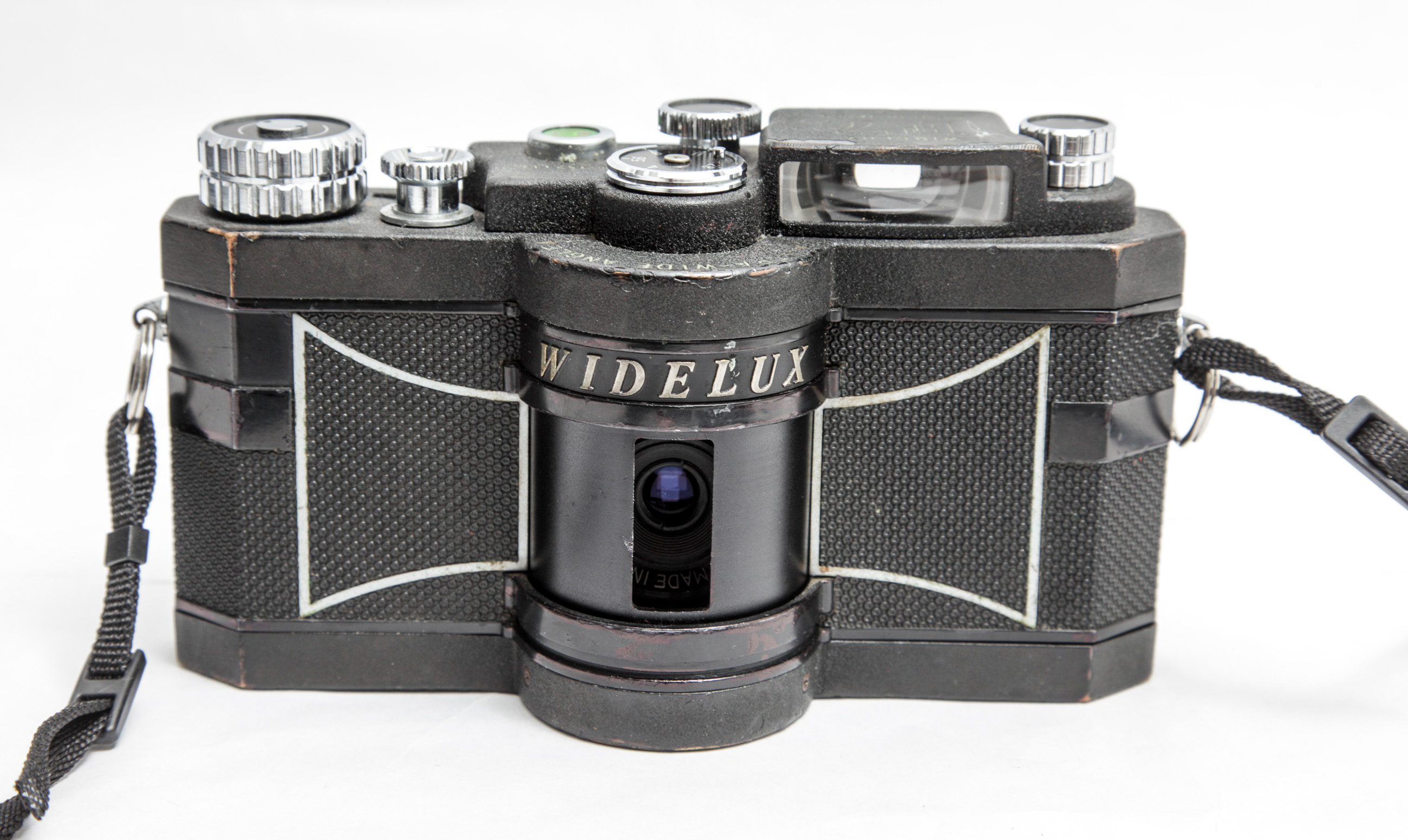
Front view of the Widelux showing the rotating lens cylinder

The revolving drum is an unusual FP shutter that has been used in several specialised panoramic cameras such as the Panon Widelux (1959, Japan) and KMZ Horizont (1968, Soviet Union). Instead of using an extremely short focal length (wide-angle) lens to achieve an extra-wide field of view, these cameras have a medium-wide lens encapsulated in a drum with a rear vertical slit. As the entire drum is horizontally pivoted on the lens's rear nodal point, the slit wipes an extra-wide-aspect image onto film held against a curved focal plane. The Widelux produced a 140° wide image in a 24×59 mm frame on 135 film with a Lux 26 mm f/2.8 lens and controlled shutter speed by varying rotation speed on a fixed slit width.

In the Kodak Cirkut (1907, US) and Globus Globuscope (1981, US) cameras, the entire camera and lens revolved as the film was pulled past the slit in the opposite direction. The Globuscope produced a 360° angle of view image in a 24×160 mm frame on 135 film with a 25 mm lens and had an adjustable slit width with a constant rotation speed.

Revolving FP shutters produce images with unusual distortion where the image center seems to bulge toward the viewer, while the periphery appears to curve away because the lens's field of view changes as it swivels. This distortion will disappear if the photograph is mounted on a circularly curved support and viewed with the eye at the center. Revolving shutters that do not rotate smoothly may create uneven exposure that will result in vertical banding in the image. Using the flash will also interfere.

These cameras are often used for photographing large groups of people (e.g., the 'school' photograph). The subjects may be arranged in a shortened semicircle with the camera at the centre such that all the subjects are the same distance from the camera and facing the camera. Once the exposure is made and processed, the panoramic print shows everyone in a straight line facing in the same direction. The distortion present in the background betrays the technique.

== History and technical development ==
The earliest daguerreotype, invented in 1839, did not have shutters, because the lack of sensitivity of the process and the small apertures of available lenses meant that exposure times were measured in many minutes. A photographer could easily control exposure time by removing and returning the camera lens' lens cap or plug.

However, during the 19th century, as one increased-sensitivity process replaced another and larger aperture lenses became available, exposure times shortened to seconds and then to fractions of a second. Exposure timing control mechanisms became a necessary accessory and then a standard camera feature.

=== Single-curtain focal-plane shutter ===
The earliest manufactured shutter was the drop shutter of the 1870s. This was an accessory guillotine-like device—a wooden panel with a slit cutout mounted on rails in front of the camera lens that gravity dropped at a controlled rate. As the slit passed the lens, it "wiped" the exposure onto the photographic plate. With rubber bands to increase the drop speed, a 1/500 or 1/1000 s shutter speed could be reached. Eadweard Muybridge used shutters of this type in his trotting horse studies. By the 1880s, lens front-mounted accessory shutter boxes were available, containing a rubberised silk cloth curtain (also called a blind) with one or more width slit cutouts wound around two parallel drums and using springs to pull a slit from one drum to the other. The spring tension and the slit width can be adjusted.

In 1883, Ottomar Anschütz (Germany) patented a camera with an internal roller blind shutter mechanism, just in front of the photographic plate. Thus, the focal-plane shutter in its modern form was created. Goerz manufactured the Anschütz Camera as the first production FP shutter camera in 1890. Francis Blake invented a type of focal plane shutter camera in 1889 that achieved shutter speeds of 1/2000 second, and exhibited numerous stop-action photographs. A drop shutter-like mechanism with an adjustable slit was used at the focal plane of an apparently one-off William England camera in 1861 and this is considered the first FP shutter of any kind.

If the lens on a single curtain FP shutter camera has its lens cap off when the shutter is cocked, the film will be double exposed when the blind's cutout re-passes the film gate. A camera-mounted FP shutter can use a very narrow slit to have a 1/1000 second shutter speed—although the available contemporaneous ISO 1 to 3 equivalent speed emulsions limited the opportunities to use the high speeds. Folmer and Schwing (US) were the most famous proponents of single curtain FP shutters, with their large format sheet film Graflex single-lens reflex and Graphic press cameras using them from 1905 to 1973. Their most common 4×5 inch shutters had four slit widths ranging from 1 1/2 to 1/8 inch and up to six spring tensions for a speed range of 1/10 to 1/1000 second.

=== Leica-type dual-curtain focal-plane shutter ===
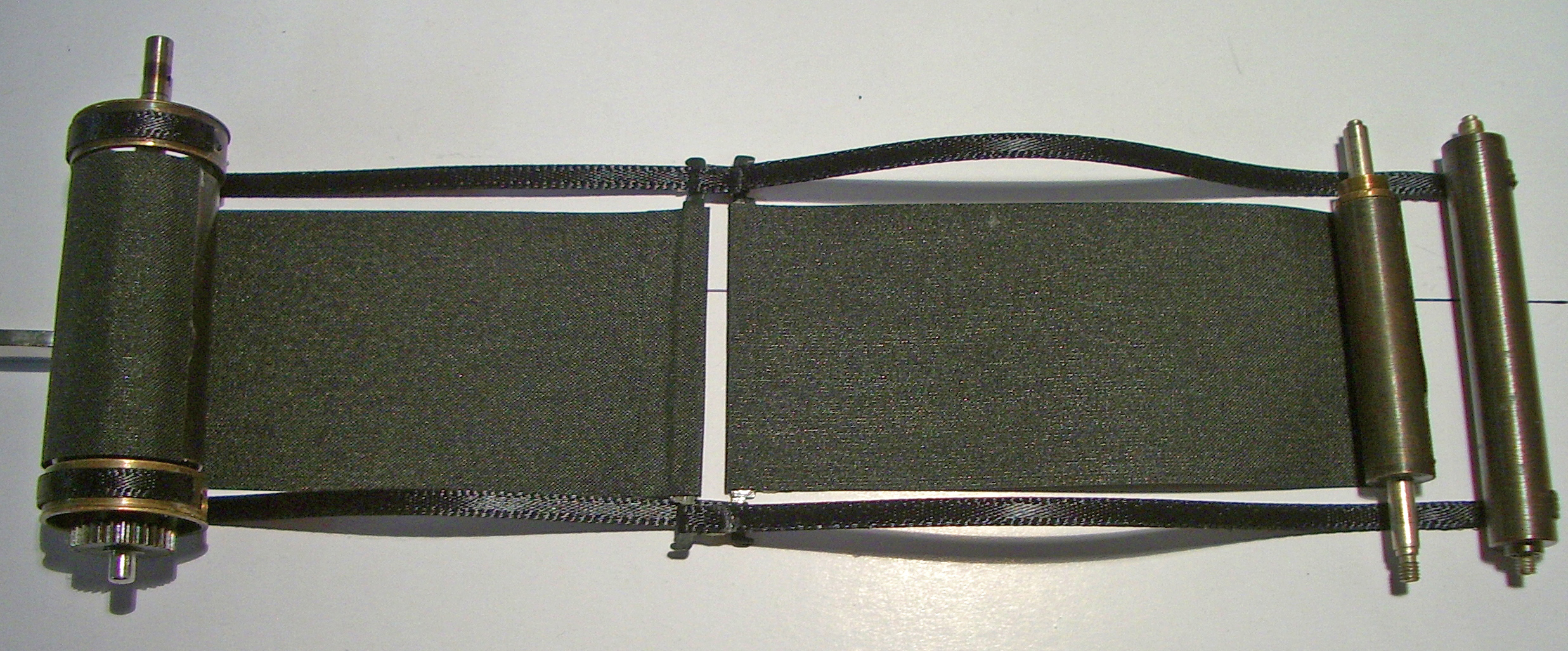
Shutter curtains of a Zorki 1s, similar to Leica II

In 1925, the Leica A (Germany) 35 mm camera was introduced with a dual-cloth-curtain, horizontal-travelling-slit, focal-plane shutter. A dual curtain FP shutter does not have precut slits and the spring tension is not adjustable. The exposure slit is formed by drawing open the first curtain onto one drum and then pulling closed the second curtain off a second drum after a clockwork escapement timed delay (imagine two overlapping window shades) and moving at one speed (technically, the curtains are still accelerating slightly) across the film gate. Faster shutter speeds are provided by timing the second shutter curtain to close sooner after the first curtain opens and narrowing the slit, wiping the film. Dual curtain FP shutters are self-capping; the curtains are designed to overlap as the shutter is cocked to prevent double exposure.

Although self-capping dual curtain FP shutters date back to the late 19th century, the Leica design made them popular and virtually all FP shutters introduced since 1925 are dual curtain models. As revised in the 1954 Leica M3 (West Germany), a typical Leica-type horizontal FP shutter for 35 mm cameras is pre-tensioned to traverse the 36 millimeter wide film gate in 18 milliseconds (at 2 meters per second) and supports slit widths for a speed range of 1 to 1/1000 s. A minimum 2 mm wide slit produces a maximum 1/1000 s effective shutter speed. The dual curtain FP shutter has the same fast-speed distortion problems as the single curtain type. FP shutters were also common in medium-format 120 roll film cameras.

Horizontal cloth FP shutters are normally limited to 1/1000 s maximum speed because of the difficulties in precisely timing extremely narrow slits and the unacceptable distortion resulting from a relatively slow wipe speed. Their maximum flash synchronization speed is also limited because the slit is fully open only to the film gate (36 mm wide or wider) and able to be flash exposed up to 1/60 s X-synchronization (nominal; 18 ms = 1/55 s actual maximum; in reality, a 40 mm slit to allow for variance gives 1/50 s ⅓ stop slow). Some horizontal FP shutters exceeded these limits by narrowing the slit or increasing curtain velocity beyond the norm; however, these tended to be ultra-high-precision models used in expensive professional-level cameras. The first such shutter was to be found in the Konica F, released in February 1960. Called the Hi-Synchro, this shutter reached a speed of 1/2000 s and made possible flash synchronization at 1/125 s.

=== Square-type metal-bladed focal-plane shutter ===
In 1960, the Konica F (Japan) 35 mm SLR began a long term incremental increase in maximum shutter speeds with its "High Synchro" FP shutter. This shutter greatly improved efficiency over the typical Leica shutter by using stronger metal blade sheaves that were "fanned" much faster, vertically along the minor axis of the 24×36 mm frame. As perfected in 1965 by Copal, the Copal Square's slit traversed the 24 mm high film gate in 7 ms (3.4 m/s). This doubled the flash X-sync speed to 1/125 s. In addition, a minimum 1.7 mm wide slit would double the top shutter speed to a maximum of 1/2000 s. Most Squares were derated to 1/1000 s in the interest of reliability.

Squares came from the supplier as complete drop-in modules. Square-type FP shutters were originally bulky in size and noisy in operation, limiting their popularity in the 1960s. Although Konica and Nikkormat and Topcon (D-1) were major users of the Copal Square. It moved from three-axis to four-axis designs (one control axis for each curtain drum axis instead of one control for both drums). New compact and quieter Square designs were introduced in the 1970s. The most notable were the Copal Compact Shutter (CCS), introduced by the Konica Autoreflex TC in 1976, and the Seiko Metal Focal-Plane Compact (MFC), first used in the Pentax ME in 1977. The Leica Camera (originally E. Leitz) switched to a vertical metal FP shutter in 2006 for its first digital rangefinder (RF) camera, the Leica M8 (Germany). The Contax (Germany) 35 mm RF camera of 1932 had a vertical travel FP shutter with dual brass-slatted roller blinds with adjustable spring tension and slit width and a top speed of 1/1000 s (the Contax II of 1936 had a claimed 1/1250 s top speed).

=== Quest for higher speed ===
Although the Square shutter improved the FP shutter, it still limited maximum flash X-sync speed to 1/125 s (unless using special long-burn FP flash bulbs that burn throughout the slit wipe, making slit width irrelevant). Some leaf shutters from the 1960s could achieve at least 1/500 s flash sync.

Copal collaborated with Nippon Kogaku to change the Compact Square shutter for the Nikon FM2 (Japan) of 1982 to using a honeycomb pattern-etched titanium foil for its blade sheaves. This permitted cutting shutter-curtain travel time by nearly half to 3.6 ms (at 6.7 m/s) and allowed 1/200 s flash X-sync speed. It also has a distortionless top speed of up to 1/4000 s (with a 1.7 mm slit). The Nikon FE2 (Japan) had a 3.3 ms (at 7.3 m/s) curtain travel time and an X-sync speed of 1/250 s in 1983. The top speed remained 1/4000 s (with a 1.8 mm slit).

The fastest focal-plane shutter ever used in a film camera was the 1.8 ms curtain travel time (at 13.3 m/s) duralumin and carbon fiber bladed one introduced by the Minolta Maxxum 9xi (named Dynax 9xi in Europe, α-9xi in Japan) in 1992. It provided a maximum 1/12,000 s (with 1.1 mm slit) and 1/300 s X-sync. A later version of this shutter, spec'ed for 100,000 actuations, was used in the Minolta Maxxum 9 (named Dynax 9 in Europe, α-9 in Japan) in 1998 and Minolta Maxxum 9Ti (named Dynax 9Ti in Europe, α-9Ti in Japan) in 1999.

=== Electronically controlled focal-plane shutter ===
A parallel development to faster speed FP shutters was electronic shutter control. In 1966, the VEB Pentacon Praktica electronic (East Germany) was the first SLR with an electronically controlled FP shutter. It used electronic circuitry to time its shutter instead of the traditional spring/gear/lever clockwork mechanisms. In 1971, the Asahi Pentax Electro Spotmatic (Japan; name shortened to Asahi Pentax ES in 1972; called Honeywell Pentax ES in US) tied its electronically controlled shutter to its exposure control light meter to provide electronic aperture-priority autoexposure.

The traditional 1/1000 s and 1/2000 s top speeds of horizontal and vertical FP shutters are often 1/4 stop too slow, even in ultra-high-quality models. Spring powered geartrains reliably time any higher accelerations and shocks. For example, some highly tensioned FP shutters could suffer from "shutter curtain bounce". If the curtains are not properly braked after crossing the film gate, they might crash and bounce; reopening the shutter and causing double exposure ghosting bands on the image edge. Even the Nikon F2's ultra-high precision shutter suffered from this as an early production teething problem.

At first, electromagnets controlled by analogue resistor/capacitor timers were used to govern the release of the second shutter curtain (though still operated by spring power). In 1979, the Yashica Contax 139 Quartz (Japan) introduced digital piezoelectric quartz (shortly followed by ceramic) oscillator circuits (ultimately under digital microprocessor control) to time and sequence its entire exposure cycle, including its vertical FP shutter. Electric "coreless" micromotors, with near instantaneous on/off capability and relatively high power for their size, would drive both curtains and other camera systems replacing springs in the late 1980s. Minimizing mechanical moving parts also helped to prevent inertial shock vibration problems.

A spring-wound clockwork escapement must completely unwind fairly quickly and limit the longest speed—generally to one full second, although the Kine Exakta (Germany) offered 12 s in 1936. The Olympus OM-2's electronically timed horizontal FP shutter could reach 60 s in 1975 and the Olympus OM-4 (both Japan) reached 240 s in 1983. The Pentax LX (Japan, 1980) and Canon New F-1 (Japan, 1981) had hybrid electromechanical FP shutters that timed their fast speeds mechanically, but used electronics only to extend the slow speed range; the LX to 125 s and the F-1N to 8 s.

Electronics are also responsible for pushing the focal-plane shutter's X-sync speed beyond its mechanical limits. A horizontal FP shutter for 35 mm cameras is fully open and usable only for flash exposure up to 1/60 s, while vertical FP shutters are usually limited to 1/125 s. At higher speeds, a normal 1 millisecond electronic flash burst would expose only the part open to the slit. In 1986, the Olympus OM-4T (Japan) introduced a system that could synchronize an Olympus F280 Full Synchro electronic flash to pulse its light at a 20 kilohertz rate for up to 40 ms to illuminate its horizontal FP shutter's slit as it crossed the entire film gate—in effect, simulating long-burn FP flashbulbs—allowing flash exposure at shutter speeds as fast as 1/2000 s. There is a concomitant loss of flash range. Extended "FP flash" sync speeds began appearing in many high-end 35 mm SLRs in the mid-1990s, and reached 1/12,000 s in the Minolta Maxxum 9 (Japan; called Dynax 9 in Europe, Alpha 9 in Japan) of 1998. They are still offered in some digital SLRs to 1/8000 s. Leaf shutter cameras are not affected by this issue.

=== Focal-plane shutters today ===
Focal-plane shutter top speed peaked at 1/16,000 s (and 1/500 s X-sync) in 1999 with the Nikon D1 digital SLR. The D1 used electronic assist from its sensor for the 1/16,000 s speed and its 15.6×23.7 mm "APS-size" sensor was smaller than 35 mm film and therefore easier to cross quickly for 1/500 s X-sync.

However, with very limited need for such extremely fast speeds, FP shutters retreated to 1/8000 s in 2003 (and 1/250 s X-sync in 2006)—even in professional level cameras. In addition, since no specialised timers are needed for extremely slow speeds, the slowest speed setting is usually 30 s. Instead, over the last twenty years, most effort has gone into improving durability and reliability. Whereas the best mechanically controlled shutters were rated for 150,000 cycles and had an accuracy of ±¼ stop from nominal value (more typically 50,000 cycles at ±½ stop).

In the last few years, digital point-and-shoot cameras have been using timed electronic sampling of the image sensor, replacing the traditional mechanical leaf shutter with delicate moving parts that can wear out, used by film-based point-and-shoot units. Something similar is also occurring with digital cameras that, in the past, would have used focal-plane shutters. For example, the Panasonic Lumix DMC-G3 (2011, Japan) interchangeable lens digital camera has an FP shutter, but in its 20 frames per second SH Burst mode, it locks its mechanical shutter open and electronically scans its digital sensor, although with a reduced resolution of 4 megapixels from 16 MP.
