= Charles F. Bretzman =

American photographer

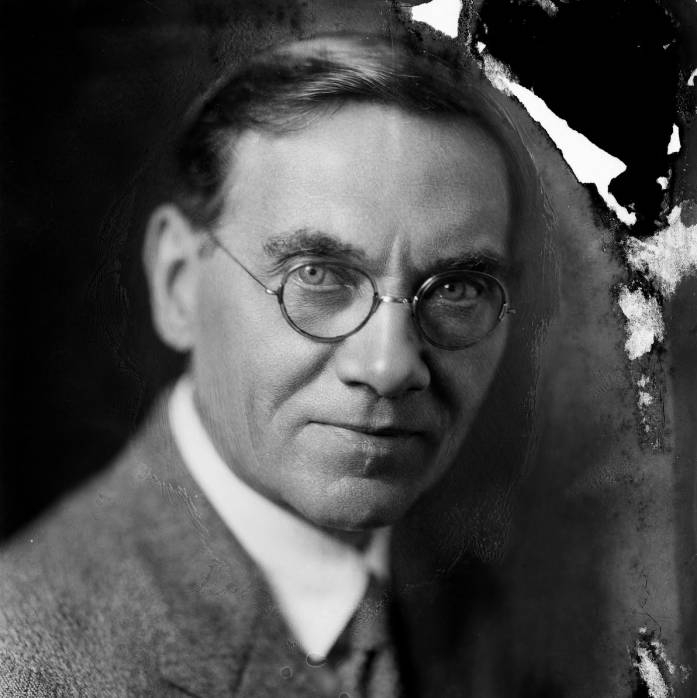
- Charles F. Bretzman in 1929
- Born: July 26, 1867; Hanover, Germany
- Died: January 19, 1934 (aged 67); Indianapolis, Indiana, US
- Resting place: Crown Hill Cemetery and Arboretum, Indianapolis, Indiana U.S.
- Occupation: Photographer
- Spouse(s): Catharine Bretzman (m. 1891–1904); Bertha (Grauel) Bretzman (m. 1905–1934)
- Children: Two sons and four daughters

Charles F. Bretzman (July 26, 1867 – January 19, 1934) founded the Bretzman Photo Company, also called the Bretzman Studio, in Indianapolis, Indiana, at the turn of the twentieth century and was a noted portrait and commercial photographer in the city for more than thirty years. In addition to operating his own photography studio, Bretzman worked for a few years as a staff photographer for three of Indianapolis's daily newspapers and became the first official photographer of the Indianapolis 500-mile automobile race. Bretzman's photographs documented Indianapolis's people, places, and events in the early decades of the twentieth century. His work includes portraits of notable individuals, such as Hoosier poet James Whitcomb Riley and Carl G. Fisher, a founder of the Indianapolis Motor Speedway, as well as photographs of the first Indianapolis 500 race in 1911 and other major events in the city's history.

The German-born photographer came to the United States in 1885 and traveled across the country for a few years before settling in Indianapolis in 1900 and establishing a photography studio on South Illinois Street. In 1914 he expanded his business to larger quarters on the top floor of the Fletcher Savings and Trust Building. Bretzman's son, C. Noble, and grandson, Erich, also became professional photographers in the family business. The Bretzman Photo Company closed after nearly eighty years in operation when Noble retired from full-time photography in 1976. Bretzman Photo Company photographs are in the collections of the Indiana Historical Society and the Library of Congress, among others.

== Early life and family ==
Charles F. Bretzman was born on July 26, 1866, in Hanover, Germany, and came to the United States in 1885 at the age of nineteen. Charles became a naturalized citizen of the United States at Chicago, Illinois, on October 4, 1892.

Charles married his first wife, Catharine, in 1891; she died on May 23, 1904, at Indianapolis. Charles and his second wife, Bertha Grauel, were married on June 8, 1905, in Indianapolis. Charles Bretzman had two sons (Charles "Carl" F. and Charles Noble) and four daughters (Marie, Julia, Rosemary, and Bertha F.).

Charles "Carl" F. Bretzman ( –1958) the son of Charles and Catharine Bretzman, was born in Chicago and worked in his father's photography studio in Indianapolis before moving to the South; he worked as a professional photographer in the Mobile, Alabama-area.

Charles Noble Bretzman (1909–1986), the son of Charles and Bertha G. Bretzman, became "one of the country's top photographers." A graduate of Shortridge High School in Indianapolis, Indiana, Noble began his career as a journeyman photographer in his father's Indianapolis studio. After high school graduation, Noble took photography classes at a school run by professional photographers at Winona Lake in Kosciusko County, Indiana, before relocating to the East Coast. In the early 1930s, when Noble was a professional photographer in New York City, he became the first public relations photographer for the Radio City Music Hall.

Noble returned to Indianapolis after his father's death in 1934 to run the family's photography business. He specialized in portraits and commercial photography and brought a contemporary and distinctive photographic style to the city. In his later years, Noble became especially interested in photographing performance art, most notably ballet, and was a cofounding board member of Indianapolis's first professional ballet company and general manager of the Indianapolis Ballet Theatre. Noble also founded Bravo Project, Inc., a not-for-profit organization that encouraged Marion County, Indiana, youth in the performing arts.

== Career ==
=== Early years ===
In his early career, Charles Bretzman worked for several years in large photography companies in New York City and elsewhere in the Midwest and eastern United States. He also engaged in photographic work in Denver and Pueblo, Colorado, as well as other cities in the western United States to gain a broad knowledge of the photography business. By 1894 he had become a partner in Koehne and Bretzman, a photography company in Chicago, Illinois.

=== Indianapolis studio ===
In an article appearing in the Indianapolis Star on February 9, 1920, Bretzman explained that he arrived in Indianapolis, on February 13, 1900, and worked as a staff photographer for three of Indianapolis's daily newspapers. His earliest photography studio in Indianapolis was located in the heart of the city's business district at that time, at 142 South Illinois Street, where he focused on portrait work and commercial photography. In 1905 Bretzman expanded his studio to larger quarters he had leased on two floors at 22 1/2 North Pennsylvania Street. It was during this time that Bretzman became the first official photographer of the Indianapolis 500-mile automobile race.

Bretzman photographed the first Indianapolis 500 race on May 30, 1911, and continued in that role for several years. He also photographed other sporting events held at the Indianapolis Motor Speedway during the years leading up to its first 500-mile automobile race. These events included a national balloon race held at the Speedway in June 1909, a three-day event in August 1909 that included motorcycle and automobile races, a three-day event in May 1910 that featured forty-two auto races covering distances ranging from five to 200 miles on the Speedway's new brick track, and the first national aviation meet at the Speedway in June 1910.

In 1914 Bretzman relocated his photography business to the Fletcher Savings and Trust Building at 108 North Pennsylvania Street. He planned and designed the 4,000-square-foot (370 m^{2}) studio in leased space on the top floor of the newly constructed building.

Bretzman believed that photography was "essential" and occupied "an important place in the progress of our business and social activities." He continued to be an active photographer in Indianapolis until his death in 1934. Bretzman was a cofounder and former president of the Indianapolis Photographers Association and a member of the Daguerre Club of Indiana.

== Photographic works ==
Bretzman made numerous individual and family portraits, as well as photographs of community gatherings, civic and commercial buildings, public monuments, private residences, and city parks. His photographs are represented in the collections of the Library of Congress in Washington, D. C., as well as the Indiana Historical Society, IUPUI, and the Indiana State Museum in Indianapolis.

One of Bretzman's most notable pictures was a 360-degree panoramic photograph that he made on May 30, 1907, when Theodore Roosevelt visited Indianapolis to dedicate a statue in honor of General Henry W. Lawton. The Indianapolis News commissioned Bretzman to make the photograph of Roosevelt delivering remarks to an estimated crowd of 40,000 to 50,000 people on the west steps of the Marion County, Indiana, courthouse. The Cirkut camera that Bretzman used to capture the event produced a negative that measured 8 feet 7 inches long. On May 31, 1907, the Indianapolis News published a six-foot section of Bretzman's photograph spread across two inside pages (16 columns) of the newspaper. Reprints of Bretzman's Cirkut photograph appeared in magazines and other newspapers; the Indianapolis News sold smaller reproductions of the photograph to members of the public.

Bretzman thought that a photographic portrait must capture "the spirit of the subject" and have "a lifelike quality" that required the photographer to be "conversant with the effects of light and shadows." Examples of Bretzman's portraits of notable individuals include James Whitcomb Riley, Hoosier poet; Carl G. Fisher, a founder of the Indianapolis Motor Speedway; John L. Lewis, who became president of the United Mine Workers union; Captain Paul V. McNutt, who became the governor of Indiana; and Reverend and Mrs. Garfield Thomas Haywood, among others.

Bretzman also made photographs of significant buildings around the state, including early photographs of the Indiana School for the Deaf at Indianapolis, the Indiana University campus at Bloomington, Indiana, and the French Lick Springs Hotel in Orange County, Indiana.

Bretzman's photographs of notable events include Theodore Roosevelt's visit to Indianapolis on May 30, 1907, early Indianapolis 500-mile race photographs, and an exhibition baseball game between the New York Yankees and the Indianapolis Indians in 1920, among others.

== Death and legacy ==
Bretzman died of pneumonia on January 19, 1934, at his Sutherland Avenue home in Indianapolis at the age of sixty-seven. His burial took place Crown Hill Cemetery in Indianapolis on January 22, 1934.

Bretzman's studio continued to thrive in Indianapolis after his death, when his son, Noble, took over the operation of the family's photography business. When Noble retired from full-time photography in 1976, the Bretzman photography studio closed after nearly eighty years of operation in Indianapolis, leaving behind "a captivating pictorial essay on people and event in Indiana history." The Bretzman Photo Company, which Charles founded in Indianapolis, includes numerous portraits that Charles made of individuals, as well as photographs of the first Indianapolis 500 race and major civic events in the city. His photographs also document the appearance of notable Indiana structures in the early twentieth century. Charles's son, Noble, who continued the family's photographic legacy is best known for his portraits, which include photographs of Indiana governors Paul V. McNutt and Roger D. Branigin, and fashion photography, primarily through the work he did for the L. S. Ayres and Company. One of Noble's fashion photographs inspired the L S. Ayres and Company's slogan, "The Ayres Look." Noble's photography appeared in numerous advertisements for department stores in Indianapolis and other commercial clients; he also illustrated books for the Bobbs-Merrill Company.

After a fire destroyed the Bretzman family's studio in early July 1980, Noble donated the salvageable material to the Indiana Historical Society. Later that year, at its former headquarters at 315 West Ohio Street in Indianapolis, the Society mounted an exhibition of more than 100 of the Bretzman studio's photographs from its collections.
