= Noblex =

Noblex may refer to:

- NOBLEX E-Optics GmbH, a company
- Noblex camera, a camera model
