= David Avison =

American photographer and physicist

- Born: David Avison; March 13, 1937; Harrisonburg, Virginia, United States
- Died: March 7, 2004 (aged 66); Boston, Massachusetts
- Education: PhD, Physics, Brown University
- Occupations: Photographer and physicist
- Title: Photographer
- Parent(s): Charles Avison and Kathryn Drive Avison

David Avison (March 13, 1937 – March 7, 2004) was an American photographer and physicist, best known for his use of a wide angle lens to capture nature, crowds, and portraits. Focused on panoramic photography, Avison photographed Chicago's urban landscapes, turning to Chicago's beaches for his contribution to the documentary project Changing Chicago (1987–88, Art Institute of Chicago). Avison spent the bulk of his photographic career in Chicago before moving to Boston in 1997.

Avison received his PhD in physics from Brown University in 1966 and an M.S. in photography from the Illinois Institute of Chicago's Institute of Design. He worked as an instructor of physics at Brown University from 1959 to 1966 and an instructor of physics at Purdue University from 1967 to 1969.

Combining his love of physics and photography, Avison designed and built his own panoramic cameras which he used to take all of his photographs. Two of Avison's handmade cameras as well as models and notes were donated to the George Eastman House on his death in 2004.

== Grants and awards ==
- NEA, 1977
- Midwest Museum of American Art, Elkhart, Indiana 1980
- IAC, 1984
