= Panorama portrait =

Use of panoramas to create a portrait

A panorama portrait in photography and painting is the use of panoramic photography or imaging to convey a portrait of a person. It intends to be a bi-dimensional record of a 3D reality (experiences and events related to the subject) where the whole environment is emphasized and captured.

Panoramic photography is mostly used on landscapes and architecture. The approach to panorama portraits arose from a desire to depict the whole surroundings of the artist and the subject. Examples of 16th century paintings that use perspective to wholly depict an environment include The Burial of the Count of Orgaz by El Greco and Self-portrait in a convex Mirror by The Parmigianino. M. C. Escher is also famous for his distorted or impossible perspectives, notably his Fisheye Lens Portraits and Curvilinear Perspectives.

== Information ==
Image-stitching is often used in mobile device panoramic captures, as well as surveillance systems. Building an image in segments allows artists to record time-based changes in a scene. An example is the work of the artist Michael Silvers, exhibited in the Bronx Latin American Art Biennial in New York in 2008.

Another completely different approach to panorama portrait is the Wraparound Face Texture Map, used commonly by 3D artists to provide a realistic texture and elements to be placed on 3D face models to create a highly realistic 3D virtual head.
