= Widelux =

Swing-lens panoramic camera

Widelux F7
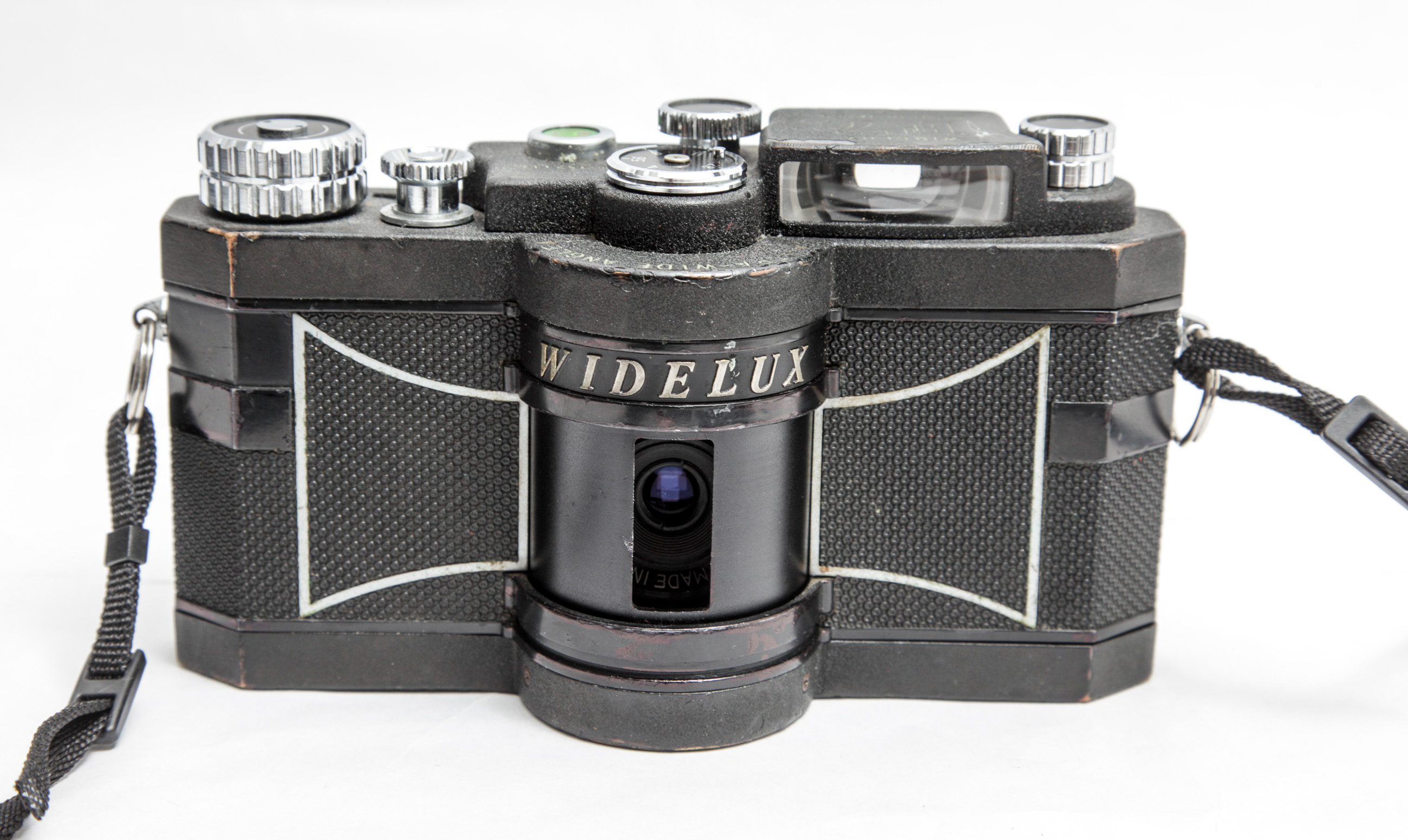
- Widelux model F7

Overview
- Maker: Panon Camera Shoko
- Type: Swing-lens Panoramic camera
- Intro price: About US$750 in 1988

Lens
- Lens: 26mm pivoting lens
- F-numbers: 2.8, 4, 5.6, 8 and 11

Sensor/medium
- Film format: 35mm
- Film size: 24mm x 56mm

Focusing
- Focus: Set at 5-6 feet

Exposure/metering
- Exposure: 1/15, 1/125, 1/250
- Exposure metering: No

Flash
- Flash: No

Shutter
- Shutter speeds: 1/15, 1/125, and 1/250

Viewfinder
- Viewfinder: Yes

General
- Made in: Japan

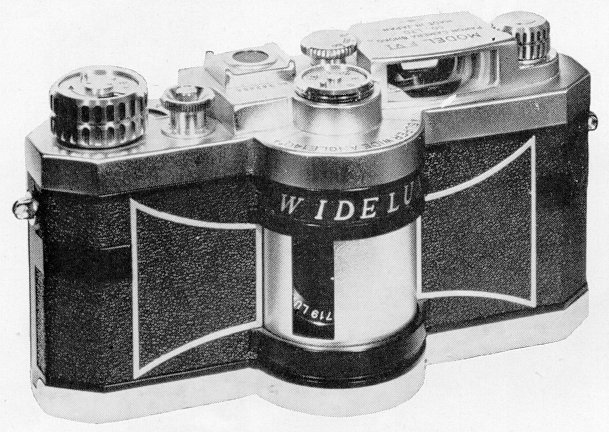
Model FVI from 1969.

The Widelux is a fully mechanical swing-lens panoramic camera developed in Japan in 1958 by Panon Camera Shoko. There are both 35mm and medium-format models. Instead of a shutter, the camera has a slit that exposes the film as the lens pivots on a horizontal arc. This pivot causes some distortions which do not occur with traditional cameras. The last Widelux model, F8, ended production in 2000.

== Models ==
=== Widelux F series 35mm ===
- Widelux FI (1959) with Vistar f/2.8 26mm
- Widelux FV (1959) with Panon f/2.8 26mm
- Widelux FVI (~1964)
- Widelux F6 (~1970)
- Widelux F6B (~1970s)
- Widelux F7 (1979–1988)
- Widelux F8 (1988–2000)

=== Medium format model 1500 ===
The medium format Widelux model 1500 makes 50x122 mm frames on 120 film, and covers a 150-degree horizontal angle across the long side. It was introduced in 1988 and cost "about US$4,500".

=== Differences ===
The core difference between the F models is improvements in the gearing. The only other notable difference is, up to the F6 model, the camera's three shutter speeds were 1/5, 1/200 and 1/50, whilst from the F6B model onwards, the cameras used the more modern speeds of 1/15, 1/125 and 1/250.

There are important differences between the F and 1500 series cameras. The 35mm cameras have a set focus (5 ft to infinity), whereas the 1500 Widelux can focus from a bit less than 1m to infinity with seven markers. The 1500 Widelux also used different shutter speeds of 1/8, 1/60 and 1/250 of a second. The F series covers a 140 degree view, whereas the 1500 series covers a slightly wider area (150 degree view-diagonally-140 degr.horizontally). The 1500 Widelux, like most manual film cameras, has a shutter that must be cocked before the camera will fire. When setting focus below 5m on Widelux 1500, the resolution will be reduced due to optical limitations.

== Notable users ==
Jeff Bridges, actor and photographer, began using the Widelux in 1984 to document life on movie sets. His distinctive behind-the-scenes panoramic images gained recognition for their candid, immersive quality. In 2003, he published a collection of these photographs in his book Pictures, which includes commentary and set photos from films like The Big Lebowski and Seabiscuit. Bridges was recognized for his Widelux photography by the International Center of Photography's Infinity Award in 2013.

Stanley Kubrick, the filmmaker, also experimented with the Widelux. A few of his panoramic photographs appear in Stanley Kubrick: A Life in Pictures, the companion book to a 2001 film documentary, and compiled by his wife Christiane Kubrick.

NASA used the Widelux in the 1960s to capture wide-angle panoramic images with minimal distortion. It was notably employed during the Gemini 5 mission, where its 140° field of view allowed astronauts to document interior spacecraft views and experimental setups in a single frame.

== WideluxX revival ==
During a podcast interview with photography magazine Silvergrain Classics in 2020, actor Jeff Bridges first brought up the idea of reviving Widelux production. Bridges ended up forming a company, SilverBridges, to bring back the camera. The new model is branded "WideluxX".

Little is known about the new model. Though Silvergrain originally intended to duplicate the old model, most of the new design had to be built from the ground up as the camera's first manufacturer lost all the original designs in 2005 due to a fire at its headquarters. Silvergrain has just stated that is will be based on the F8 model, but with small "upgrades". They also plan to use no plastic components and only manufacture in German facilities that use green electricity sources. For this reason, the pricing will probably be similar to the Leica brand (whose factory is also located in Germany), at $4400 USD.

== Similar cameras ==
Cameras with similar functions include the Noblex and Horizon.
