= Noblex camera =

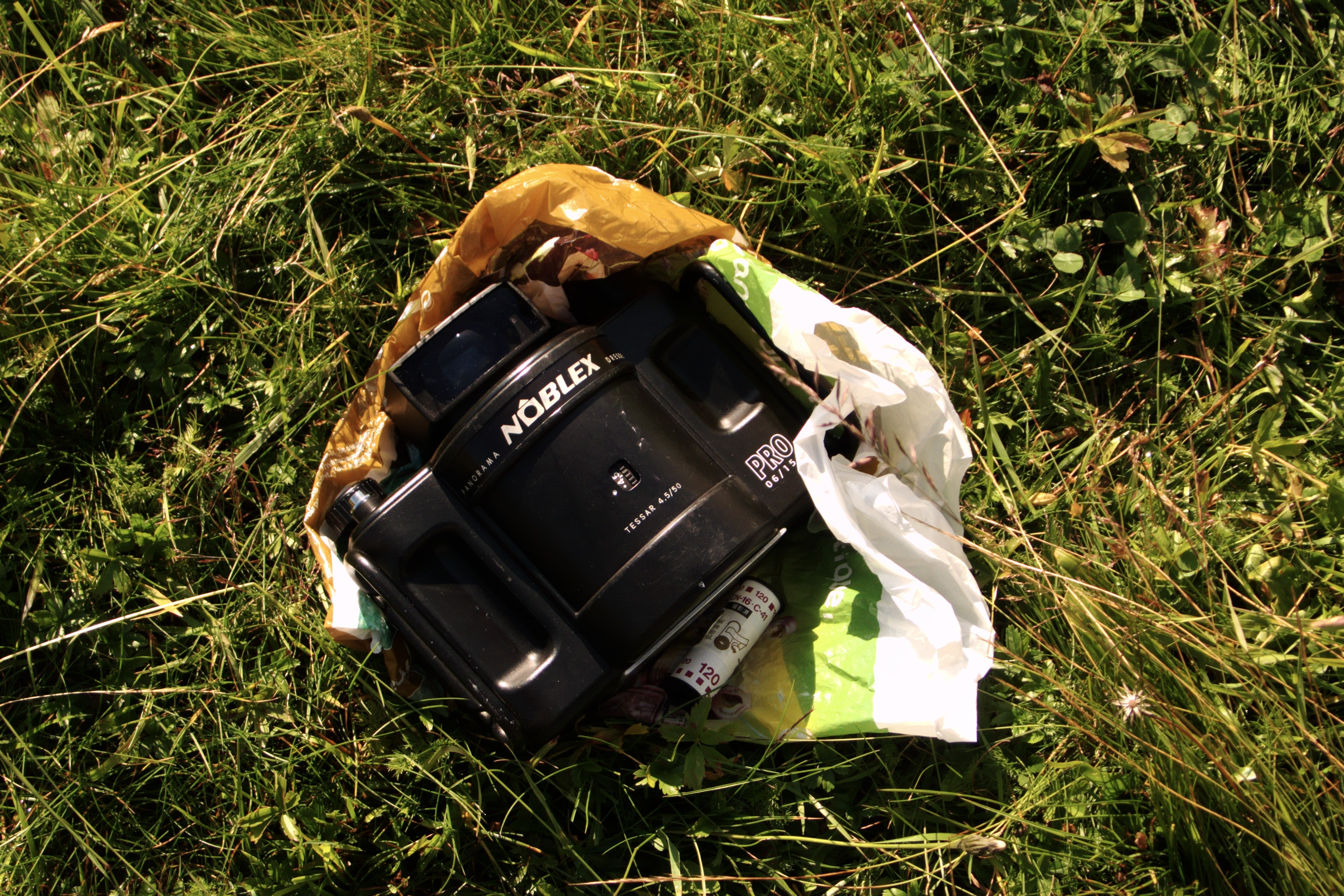
Noblex Camera

The Noblex is a German made, motor-driven swing-lens panoramic camera manufactured by Kamera-Werkstätten. There are several models of this camera for different film formats.

Cameras with similar functions include the Widelux and Horizon.
