= Panoramic photography =

Wide-angle photographic view of a scene

Panoramic photography is a technique of photography, using specialized equipment or software, that captures images with horizontally elongated fields of view. It is sometimes known as wide format photography. The term has also been applied to a photograph that is cropped to a relatively wide aspect ratio, like the familiar letterbox format in wide-screen video. When displayed interactively, it is known as an interactive panorama.

While there is no formal division between "wide-angle" and "panoramic" photography, "wide-angle" normally refers to a type of lens, but using this lens type does not necessarily make an image a panorama. An image made with an ultra wide-angle fisheye lens covering the normal film frame of 1:1.33 is not automatically considered to be a panorama. An image showing a field of view approximating, or greater than, that of the human eye – about 160° by 75° – may be termed panoramic. This generally means it has an aspect ratio of 2:1 or larger, the image being at least twice as wide as it is high. The resulting images take the form of a wide strip. Some panoramic images have aspect ratios of 4:1 and sometimes 10:1, covering fields of view of up to 360 degrees. Both the aspect ratio and coverage of field are important factors in defining a true panoramic image.

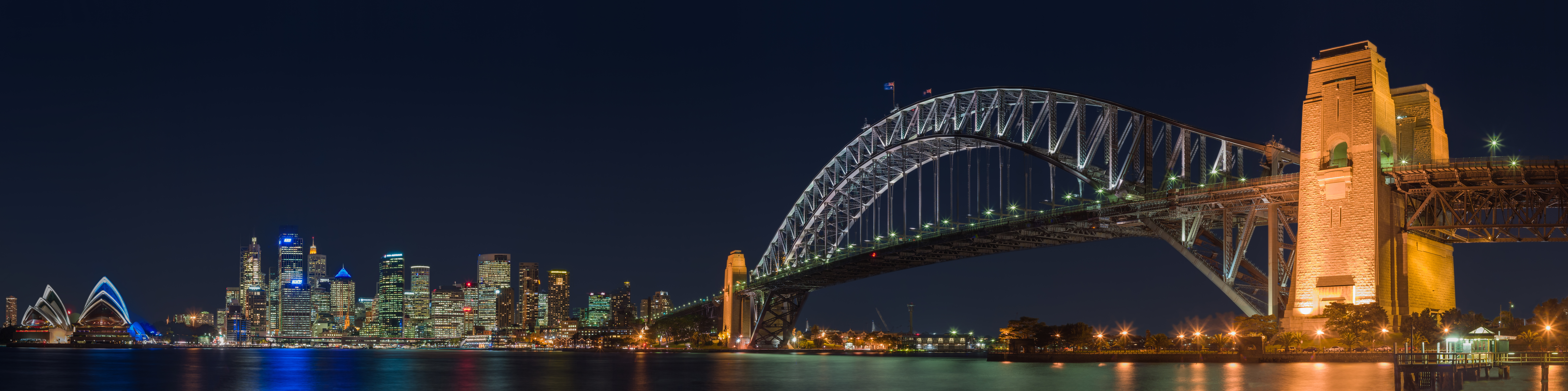
A panorama of Sydney featuring (from left) the Sydney Opera House, the central business district skyline, and the Sydney Harbour Bridge

Photo-finishers and manufacturers of Advanced Photo System (APS) cameras use the word "panoramic" to define any print format with a wide aspect ratio, not necessarily photos that encompass a large field of view.

== History ==
The device of the panorama existed in painting, particularly in murals as early as A.D. 20 in those found in Pompeii, as a means of generating an immersive 'panoptic' experience of a vista, long before the advent of photography. In the century prior to the advent of photography, and from 1787, with the work of Robert Barker, it reached a pinnacle of development in which whole buildings were constructed to house 360° panoramas, and even incorporated lighting effects and moving elements. Indeed, the careers of one of the inventors of photography, Daguerre, began in the production of popular panoramas and dioramas.

The idea and longing to create a detailed cityscape without a paintbrush, inspired Friedrich von Marten. von Marten created panoramic daguerreotype by using a special panoramic camera that he created himself. The camera could capture a broad view on a single daguerreotype plate. In complete and vivid detail, a cityscape is laid out before the viewer.

The development of panoramic cameras was a logical extension of the nineteenth-century fad for the panorama. One of the first recorded patents for a panoramic camera was submitted by Joseph Puchberger in Austria in 1843 for a hand-cranked, 150° field of view, 8-inch focal length camera that exposed a relatively large Daguerreotype, up to 24 inches (610 mm) long. A more successful and technically superior panoramic camera was assembled the next year by Friedrich von Martens in Germany in 1844. His camera, the Megaskop, used curved plates and added the crucial feature of set gears, offering a relatively steady panning speed. As a result, the camera properly exposed the photographic plate, avoiding unsteady speeds that can create an unevenness in exposure, called banding. Martens was employed by Lerebours, a photographer/publisher. It is also possible that Martens camera was perfected before Puchberger patented his camera. Because of the high cost of materials and the technical difficulty of properly exposing the plates, Daguerreotype panoramas, especially those pieced together from several plates (see below) are rare.

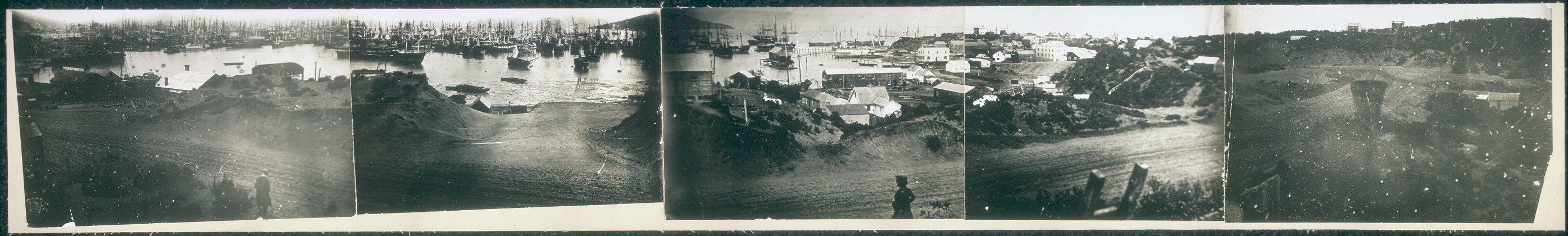
An 1851 panoramic showing San Francisco from Rincon Hill by photographer Martin Behrmanx. It is believed that the panorama initially had eleven plates, but the original daguerreotypes no longer exist.

After the advent of wet-plate collodion process, photographers would take anywhere from two to a dozen of the ensuing albumen prints and piece them together to form a panoramic image (see: Segmented). This photographic process was technically easier and far less expensive than Daguerreotypes. While William Stanley Jevons' wet-collodion Panorama of Port Jackson, New South Wales, from a high rock above Shell Cove, North Shore survived undiscovered until 1953 in his scrap-book of 1857, some of the most famous early panoramas were assembled this way by George N. Barnard, a photographer for the Union Army in the American Civil War in the 1860s. His work provided vast overviews of fortifications and terrain, much valued by engineers, generals, and artists alike. (see Photography and photographers of the American Civil War) In 1875, through remarkable effort, Bernard Otto Holtermann and Charles Bayliss coated twenty-three wet-plates measuring 56 by 46 centimeters to record a sweeping view of Sydney Harbour.

Following the invention of flexible film in 1888, panoramic photography was revolutionised. Dozens of cameras were marketed, many with brand names indicative of their era; such as the Pantascopic, (1862) Cylindrograph survey camera (1884), Kodak Panoram (1899), Wonder Panoramic (1890), and Cyclo-Pan (1970). More portable and simple to operate, and with the advantage of holding several panoramic views on the one roll, these cameras were enthusiastically deployed around the turn of the century by such photographers as the American adventurer Melvin Vaniman, who popularised the medium in Australia where it was taken up by both Pictorialist and postcard photographers, such as Robert Vere Scott, Richard T. Maurice (1859-1909), H.H. Tilbrook (1884-1937), and Harry Phillips (1873-1944).

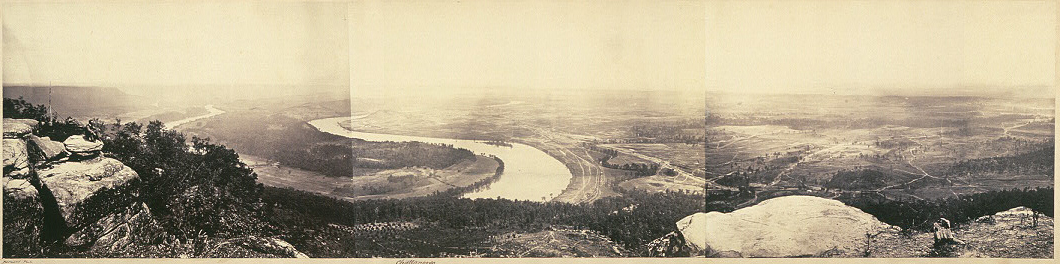
View from the top of Lookout Mountain, Tennessee, Albumen prints, February, 1864, by George N. Barnard

Panorama of Sydney from Lavender Bay, 1875, by Bernard Otto Holtermann and Charles Bayliss

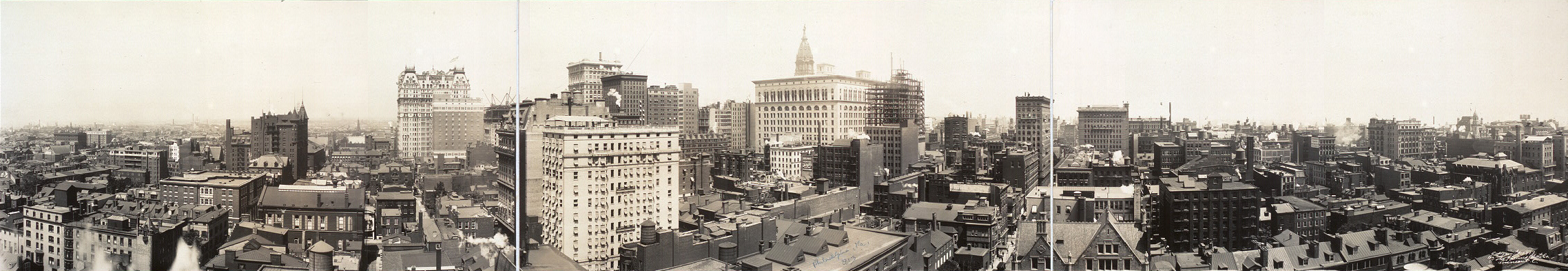
Center City Philadelphia panorama, from 1913.

== Panoramic cameras and methods ==
=== Stereo Cyclographe ===
A camera with combined two-fixed focus panoramic camera in one mahogany-wooded box. The lenses were eight centimeters apart from each other with an indicator in between the lens to help the photographer set the camera level. A clock motor transported the nine-centimeter-wide film along with turning the shaft that rotated the camera. The camera could make a 9 × 80 cm pair that required a special viewer. These images were mostly used for mapping purposes.

=== Wonder Panoramic Camera ===
Made in 1890 in Berlin, Germany, by Rudolf Stirn, the Wonder Panoramic Camera needed the photographer for its motive power. A string, inside of the camera, hanging through a hole in the tripod screw, wound around a pulley inside the wooden box camera. To take a panoramic photo, the photographer swiveled the metal cap away from the lens to start the exposure. The rotation could be set for a full 360-degree view, producing an eighteen-inch-long negative.

=== Periphote ===
Built by Lumiere Freres of Paris in 1901. The Periphote had a spring-wound clock motor that rotated, and the inside barrier held the roll of film and its take-up spool. Attached to the body was a 55mm Jarret lens and a prism that directed the light through a half-millimeter-wide aperture at the film.

=== Short rotation ===
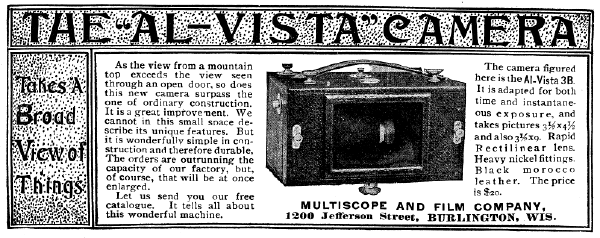
A 1900 advertisement for a short rotation panoramic camera

Short rotation, rotating lens and swing lens cameras have a lens that rotates around the camera lens's rear nodal point and use a curved film plane. As the photograph is taken, the lens pivots around its rear nodal point while a slit exposes a vertical strip of film that is aligned with the axis of the lens. The exposure usually takes a fraction of a second. Typically, these cameras capture a field of view between 110° and 140° and an aspect ratio of 2:1 to 4:1. The images produced occupy between 1.5 and 3 times as much space on the negative as the standard 24 mm x 36 mm 35 mm frame.

Cameras of this type include the Widelux, Noblex, and the Horizon. These have a negative size of approximately 24x58 mm. The Russian "Spaceview FT-2", originally an artillery spotting camera, produced wider negatives, 12 exposures on a 36-exposure 35 mm film.

A negative from a 35 mm swing lens camera

Short rotation cameras usually offer few shutter speeds and have poor focusing ability. Most models have a fixed focus lens, set to the hyperfocal distance of the maximum aperture of the lens, often at around 10 meters (33 feet). Photographers wishing to photograph closer subjects must use a small aperture to bring the foreground into focus, limiting the camera's use in low-light situations.

The distortion of architectural subjects is severe when using a rotating lens camera

Rotating lens cameras produce distortion of straight lines. This looks unusual because the image, which was captured from a sweeping, curved perspective, is being viewed flat. To view the image correctly, the viewer would have to produce a sufficiently large print and curve it identically to the curve of the film plane. This distortion can be reduced by using a swing-lens camera with a standard focal length lens. The FT-2 has a 50 mm while most other 35 mm swing lens cameras use a wide-angle lens, often 28 mm. Similar distortion is seen in panoramas shot with digital cameras using in-camera stitching.

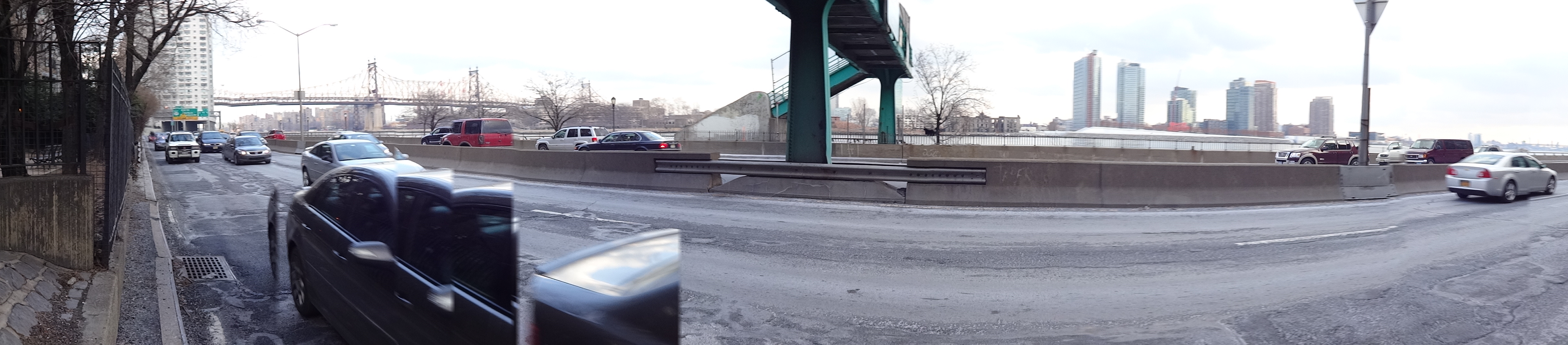
A digital camera image of Franklin D. Roosevelt East River Drive made with a Sony Cyber-shot, showing faults (discontinuities) caused by objects in fast motion during image capture. The panorama is stitched from multiple exposures taken while the camera is manually rotated.

=== Full rotation ===
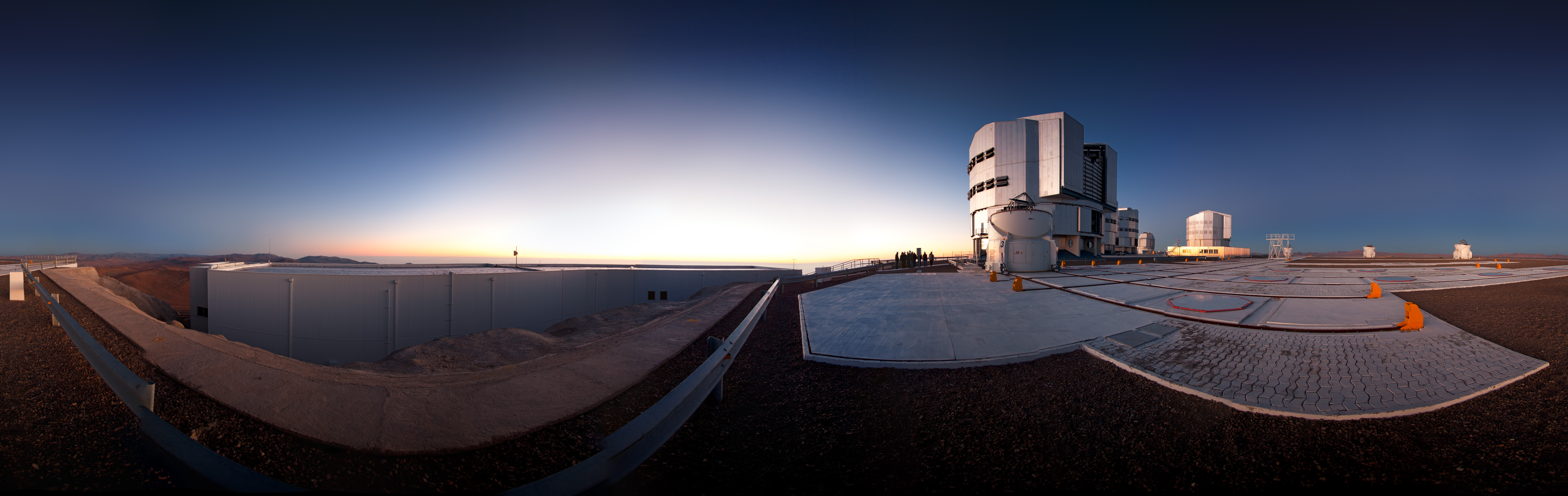
360-degree panoramic projection of the VLT survey telescope

Rotating panoramic cameras, also called slit scan or scanning cameras are capable of 360° or greater degree of rotation. A clockwork or motorized mechanism rotates the camera continuously and pulls the film through the camera, so the motion of the film matches that of the image movement across the image plane. Exposure is made through a narrow slit. The central part of the image field produces a very sharp picture that is consistent across the frame.

Digital rotating line cameras image a 360° panorama line by line. Digital cameras in this style are the Panoscan and Eyescan. Analogue cameras include the Cirkut (1905), Leme (1962), Hulcherama (1979), Globuscope (1981), Seitz Roundshot (1988) and Lomography Spinner 360° (2010).

=== Fixed lens ===
Fixed lens cameras, also called flatback, wide view or wide field, have fixed lenses and a flat image plane. These are the most common form of panoramic camera and range from inexpensive APS cameras to sophisticated 6x17 cm and 6x24 cm medium format cameras. Panoramic cameras using sheet film are available in formats up to 10 x 24 inches. APS or 35 mm cameras produce cropped images in a panoramic aspect ratio using a small area of film. Specialized 35 mm or medium format fixed-lens panoramic cameras use wide field lenses to cover an extended length as well as the full height of the film to produce images with a greater image width than normal.

Pinhole cameras of a variety of constructions can be used to make panoramic images. A popular design is the 'oatmeal box', a vertical cylindrical container in which the pinhole is made in one side and the film or photographic paper is wrapped around the inside wall opposite, and extending almost right to the edge of, the pinhole. This generates an egg-shaped image with more than 180° view.

Because they expose the film in a single exposure, fixed lens cameras can be used with electronic flash, which would not work consistently with rotational panoramic cameras.

With a flat image plane, 90° is the widest field of view that can be captured in focus and without significant wide-angle distortion or vignetting. Lenses with an imaging angle approaching 120 degrees require a center filter to correct vignetting at the edges of the image. Lenses that capture angles of up to 180°, commonly known as fisheye lenses exhibit extreme geometrical distortion but typically display less brightness falloff than rectilinear lenses.

Examples of this type of camera are: Taiyokoki Viscawide-16 ST-D (16 mm film), Siciliano Camera Works Pannaroma (35mm, 1987), Hasselblad X-Pan (35 mm, 1998), Linhof 612PC, Horseman SW612, Linhof Technorama 617, Tomiyama Art Panorama 617 and 624, and Fuji G617 and GX617 (Medium format (film)).

The panomorph lens provides a full hemispheric field of view with no blind spot, unlike catadioptric lenses.

== Digital photography ==
=== Digital stitching of segmented panoramas ===
With digital photography, the most common method for producing panoramas is to take a series of pictures and stitch them together. There are two main types: the cylindrical panorama used primarily in stills photography and the spherical panorama used for virtual-reality images.

Segmented panoramas, also called stitched panoramas, are made by joining multiple photographs with slightly overlapping fields of view to create a panoramic image. Stitching software is used to combine multiple images. Ideally, in order to correctly stitch images together without parallax error, the camera must be rotated about the center of its lens entrance pupil. Stitching software can correct some parallax errors and different programs seem to vary in their ability to correct parallax errors. In general specific panorama software seems better at this than some of the built in stitching in general photomanipulation software.

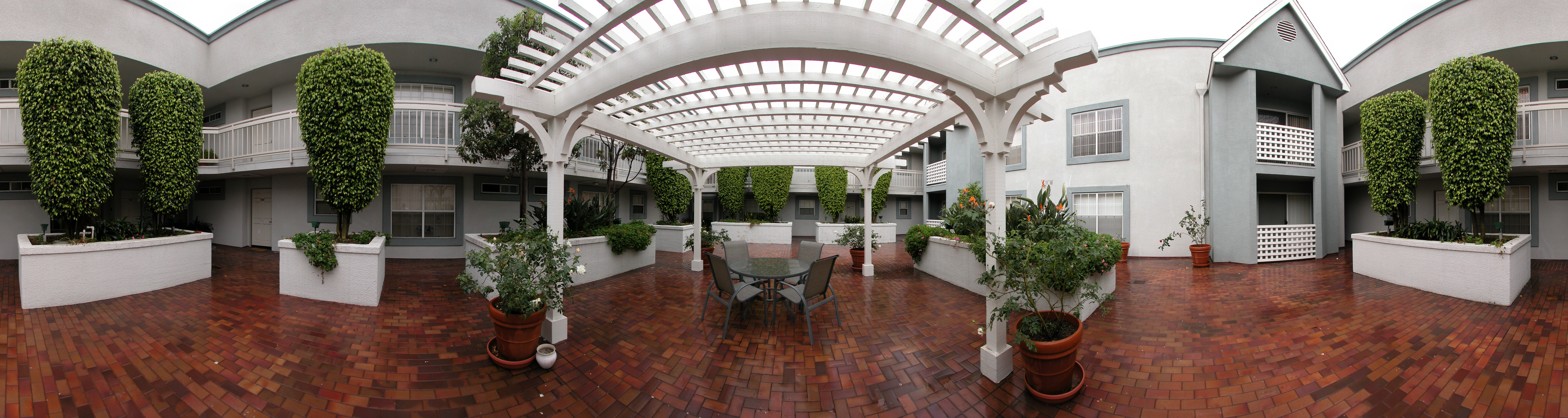
Example of a segmented panorama. Taken with a Nikon Coolpix 5000 and stitched with PTgui.

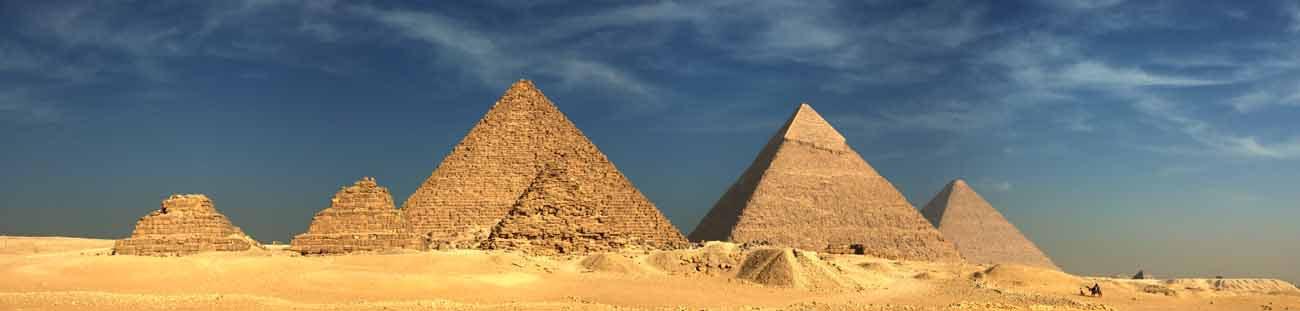
The Giza Pyramids in Cairo, Egypt

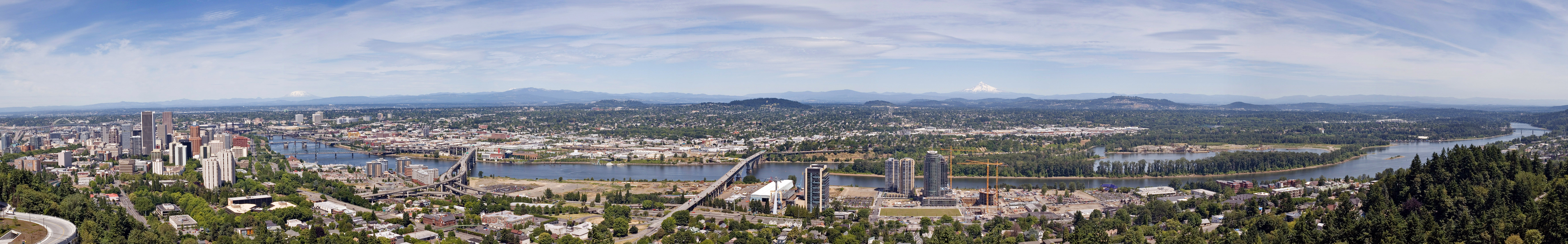
The Willamette River as it passes through western Portland, Oregon, with Mount St. Helens, Mount Adams and Mount Hood in the background

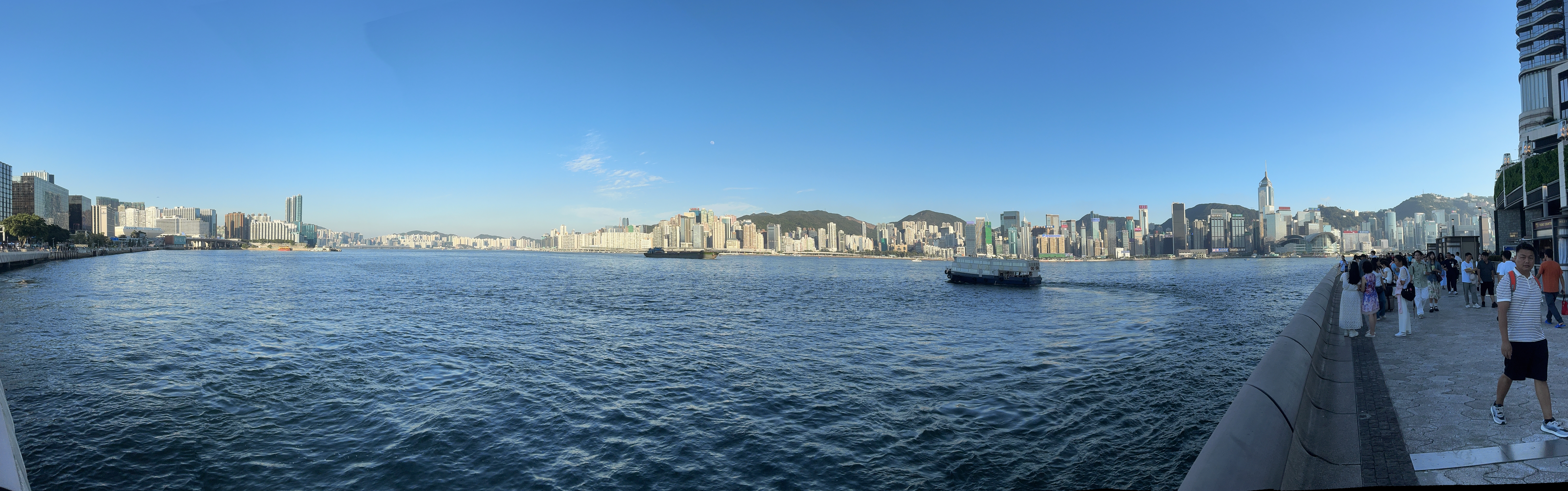
Panoramic of Rosewood Hong Kong with the view of North Point, Hung Hom and Wan Chai

=== In-camera stitching of panoramas ===
Some digital cameras especially smartphone cameras can do the stitching internally, sometimes in real time, either as a standard feature or by installing a smartphone app.

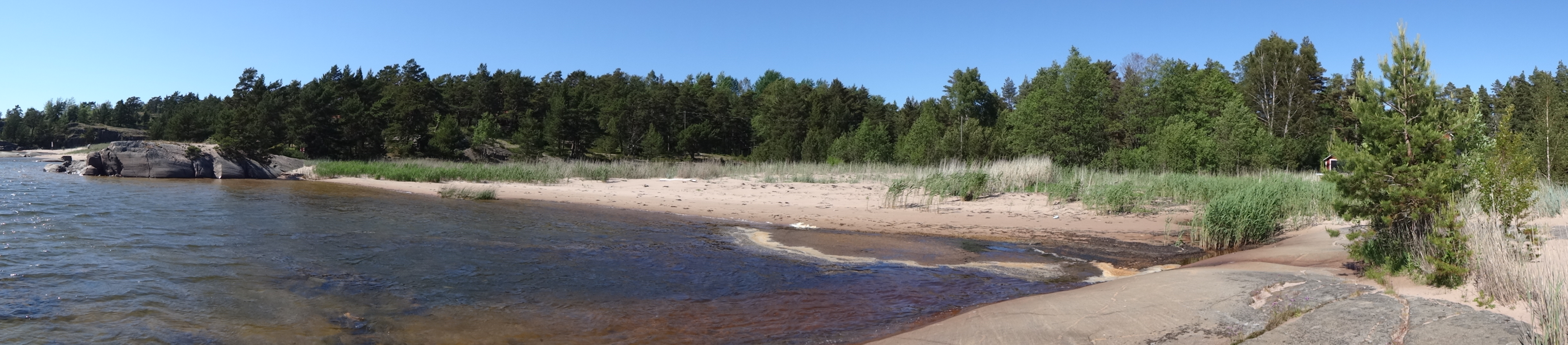
A 270-degree panorama stitched "in-camera". Many modern digital cameras can automatically stitch a sequence of images shot while the camera is panned (moved horizontally).

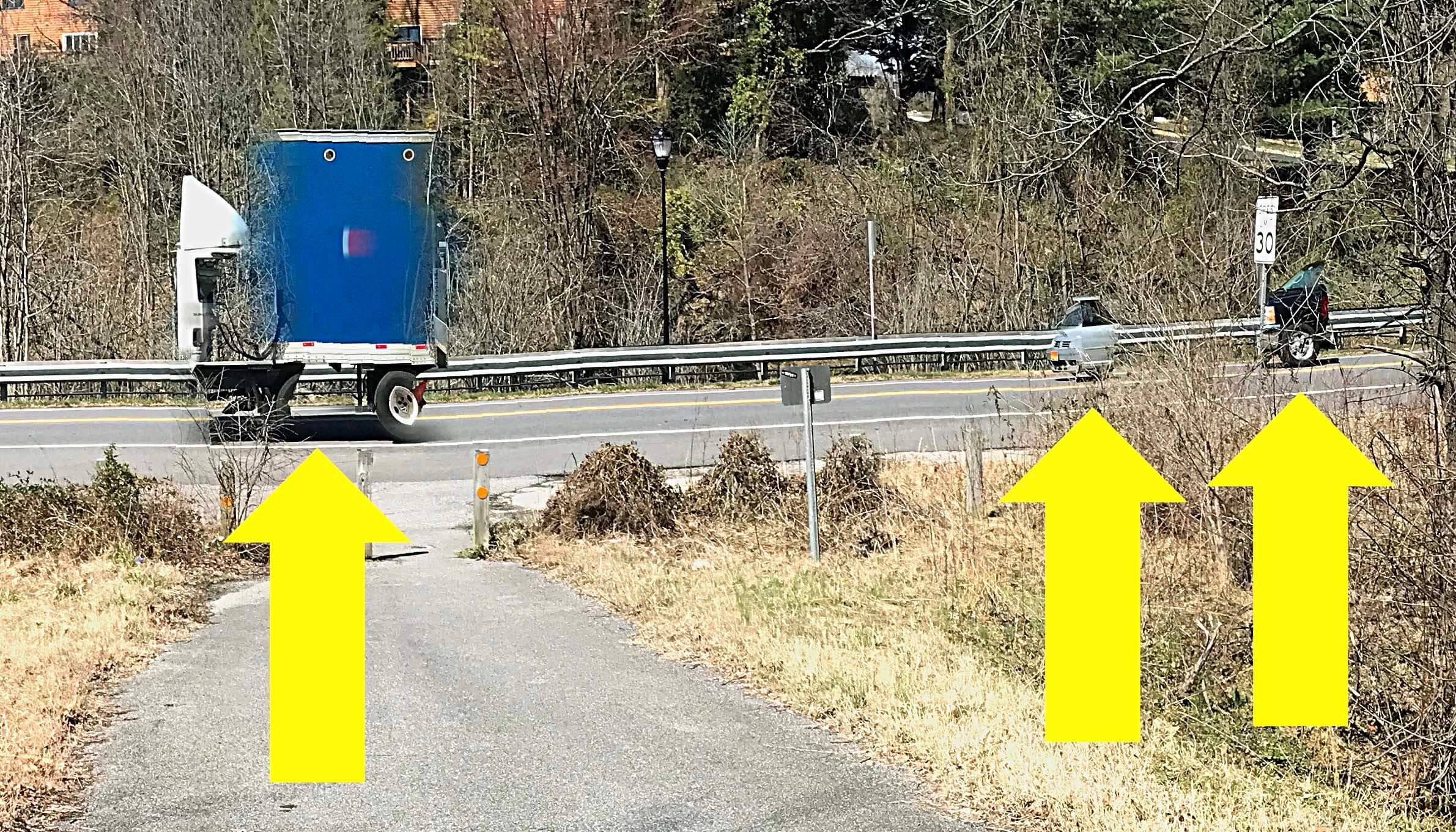
A panning smartphone camera captures moving vehicles with stitching anomalies.

=== Catadioptric cameras ===
Lens- and mirror-based (catadioptric) cameras consist of lenses and curved mirrors that reflect a 360-degree field of view into the lens' optics. The mirror shape and lens used are specifically chosen and arranged so that the camera maintains a single viewpoint. The single viewpoint means the complete panorama is effectively imaged or viewed from a single point in space. One can simply warp the acquired image into a cylindrical or spherical panorama. Even perspective views of smaller fields of view can be accurately computed.

The biggest advantage of catadioptric systems (panoramic mirror lenses) is that because one uses mirrors to bend the light rays instead of lenses (like fish eye), the image has almost no chromatic aberrations or distortions. The image, a reflection of the surface on the mirror, is in the form of a doughnut to which software is applied in order to create a flat panoramic picture. Such software is normally supplied by the company who produces the system. Because the complete panorama is imaged at once, dynamic scenes can be captured without problems. Panoramic video can be captured and has found applications in robotics and journalism. The mirror lens system uses only a partial section of the digital camera's sensor and therefore some pixels are not used. Recommendations are always to use a camera with a high pixel count in order to maximize the resolution of the final image.

There are even inexpensive add-on catadioptric lenses for smartphones, such as the GoPano micro and Kogeto Dot.

== Vertorama ==
Vertical panoramas

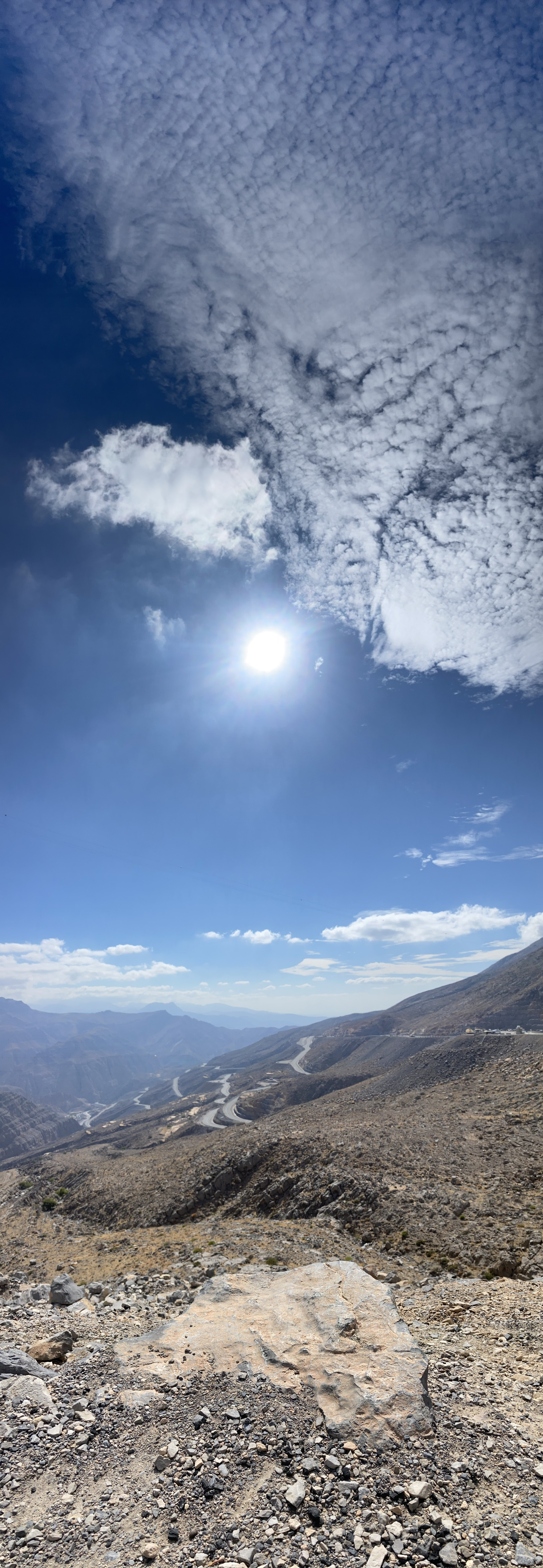
Jebel Jais on the border between Oman and United Arab Emirates

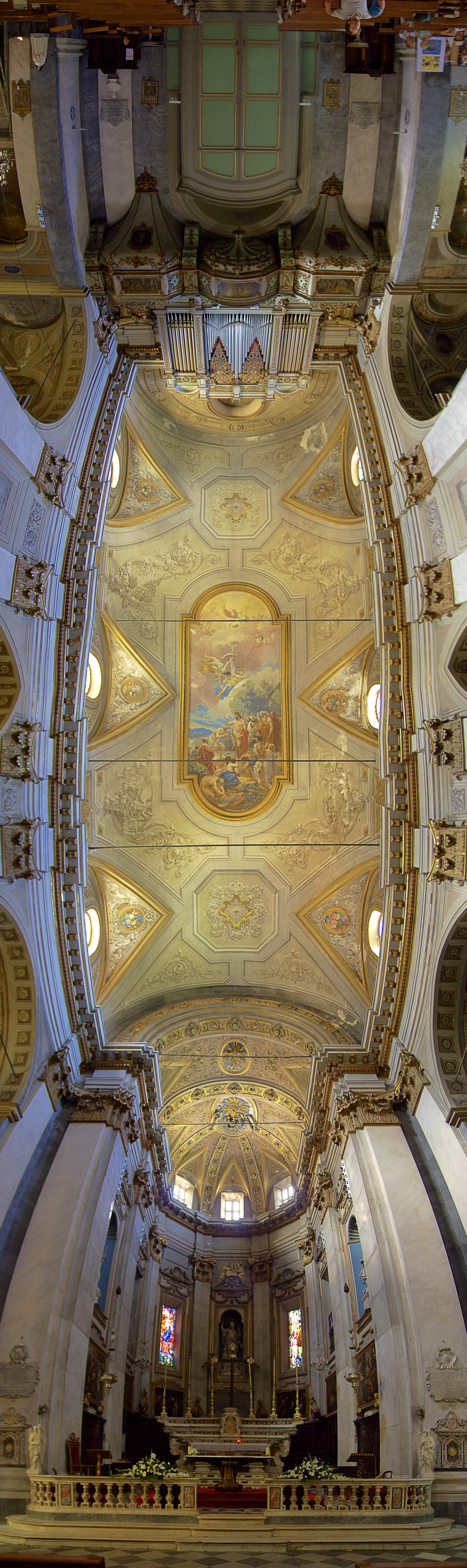
Saint-Jean-Baptiste de Bastia Church, Corsica

A vertical panorama or vertorama is a panorama with an upright orientation instead of a horizontal. It is created using the same techniques as when making a horizontal panorama.

== Artistic uses ==
=== Strip panoramas ===
Ed Ruscha's Every Building on the Sunset Strip (1966) was made by photographing building facades contiguously as seen from the back of a pickup truck traveling a 4 km length of the street. In the ironically "deadpan" spirit of his work at the time, he published the work in strip form in a foldout book, intended to be viewed from one end or the other to see either side of "The Strip" in correct orientation.

Preceding Ruscha's work, in 1954, Yoshikazu Suzuki produced an accordion-fold panorama of every building on Ginza Street, Tokyo in the Japanese architecture book Ginza, Kawaii, Ginza Haccho.

=== Joiners ===
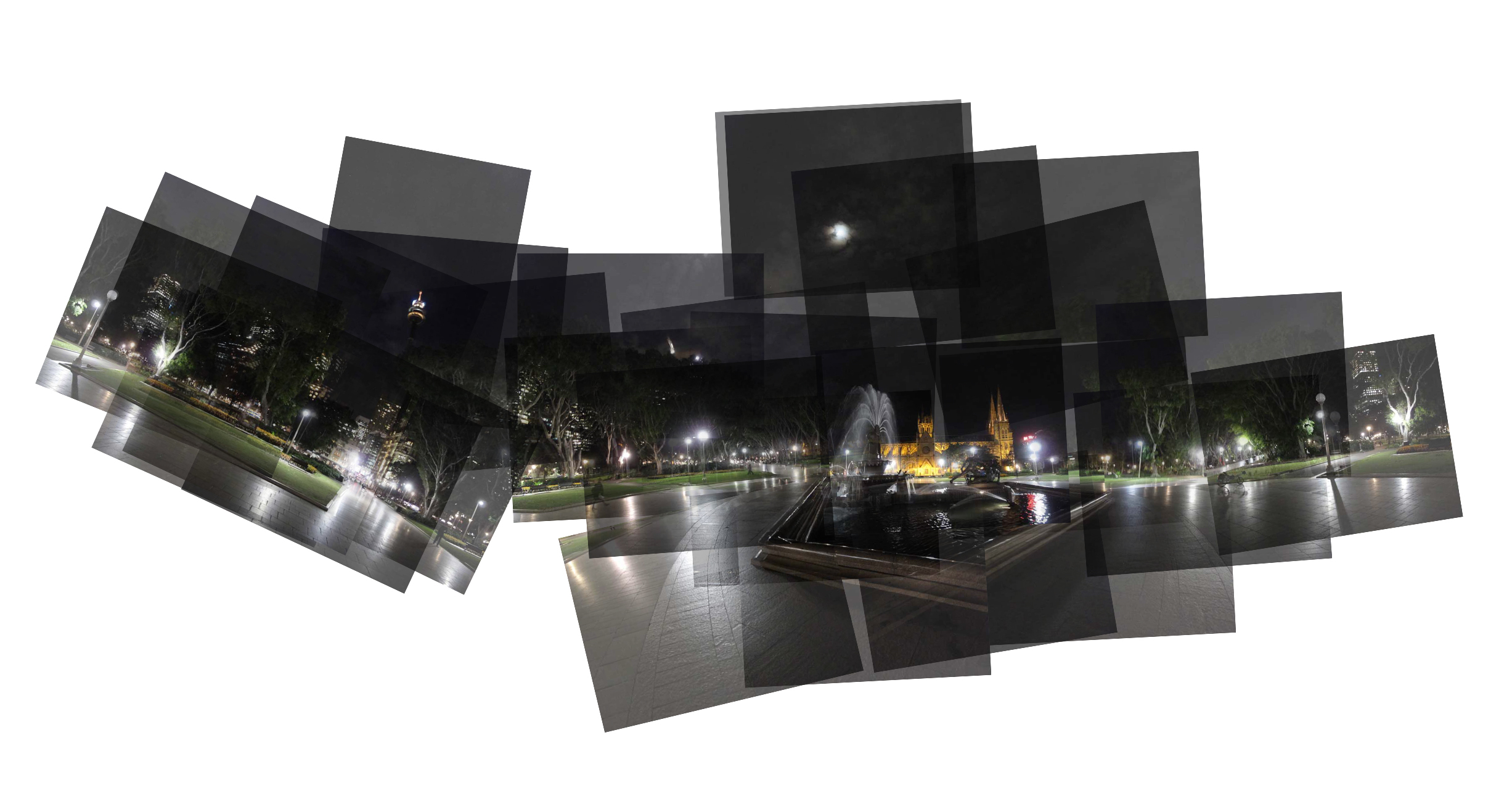
Panograph of Hyde Park in Sydney by Night

Joiners (for which the terms panography and panograph have been used) is a photographic technique in which one picture is assembled from several overlapping photographs. This can be done manually with prints or by using digital image editing software and may resemble a wide-angle or panoramic view of a scene, similar in effect to segmented panoramic photography or image stitching. A joiner is distinct because the overlapping edges between adjacent pictures are not removed; the edge becomes part of the picture. 'Joiners' or 'panography' is thus a type of photomontage and a sub-set of collage.

Artist David Hockney is an early and important contributor to this technique. Through his fascination with human vision, his efforts to render a subjective view in his artworks resulted in the manual montaging of 10x15cm high-street-processed prints of (often several entire) 35mm films as a solution. He called the resulting cut-and-paste montages "joiners", and one of his most famous is "Pearblossom Highway", held by the Getty Museum. His group was called the "Hockney joiners", and he still paints and photographs joiners today.

Jan Dibbets' Dutch Mountain series (c.1971) relies on stitching of panoramic sequences to make a mountain of the Netherlands seaside.

=== Revivalists ===
In the 1970s and 1980s, a school of art photographers took up panoramic photography, inventing new cameras and using found and updated antique cameras to revive the format. The new panoramists included Kenneth Snelson, David Avison, Art Sinsabaugh, and Jim Alinder.

=== Digital stitching ===
Andreas Gursky frequently employs digital stitching in his large-format panoramic imagery.

== See also ==
- Anamorphic format
- Cinerama
- Hemispherical photography
- Panorama portraits
- Panoramic tripod head
- Photo finish
- Photo stitching software
- Route panorama, a type of "parallel motion" or "linear" or "multi-viewpoint" panorama
- Slit-scan photography
- VR photography
