= Cirkut (camera) =

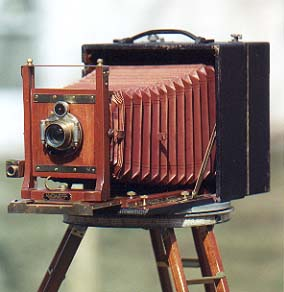
- No. 8 Cirkut

Overview
- Maker: Eastman Kodak
- Type: Panoramic

The Cirkut is a rotating panoramic camera of the type known as "full rotation". It was patented by William J. Johnston in 1904 and manufactured by Rochester Panoramic Camera Company starting in 1905; during that same year, the company was acquired by Century Camera Co. (which itself was owned by Eastman Kodak at the time). The manufacture of the camera continued through 1949.

There were several models: No. 5, No. 6, No. 8, No. 10, and No. 16, named according to the maximum width of the film accepted, in inches. The length of the film (corresponding to the width of the panorama) varied by a model as well, ranging up to 18 feet (5.5 m) for No. 16, yielding a single negative with an area of more than 24 square feet (2.2 m^{2}). Thus, the information content of Cirkut images can be in the gigapixel range.

== Operation ==
The camera captured a panoramic image by pivoting horizontally (along a vertical axis) while a roll of film moved across the film plane.

The Century Camera Company's catalog described the camera as follows:

The Cirkut Panoramic Outfit is in itself a most complete affair, being made up of a camera which can be used in the ordinary manner for plates when desired and a Panoramic Attachment which is easily and quickly attached to the camera, thus converting it into a Panoramic Outfit. The Attachment in itself is much like an ordinary Cartridge Roll Holder in that it is made to use Eastman Daylight-loading Cartridge Film. In addition it contains the mechanism which, when the outfit is in operation, unwinds the film past a slot on a roller and in so doing exposes it and at the same time revolves the camera about on an axis, a special tripod and top being furnished. A pressure on the release is all that is necessary to start the motor — another pressure stops it, thus negatives of any desired length up to 6 feet with the No. 6 and 7 feet with the No. 8 may be made. A complete circle of 360 degrees may thus be photographed if desired. There is an indicator on the top of the Film Holder showing the exact quantity of film exposed and that remaining unexposed. By another very ingenious arrangement one is enabled to determine before exposure is made how long a photograph the view decided on will be.
