= Plaubel =

Plaubel GmbH
- Type: Gesellschaft mit beschränkter Haftung
- Industry: Photography, Still cameras, lenses
- Founded: 1902
- Defunct: 2017
- Headquarters: Frankfurt, Germany
- Key people: Hugo Schrader

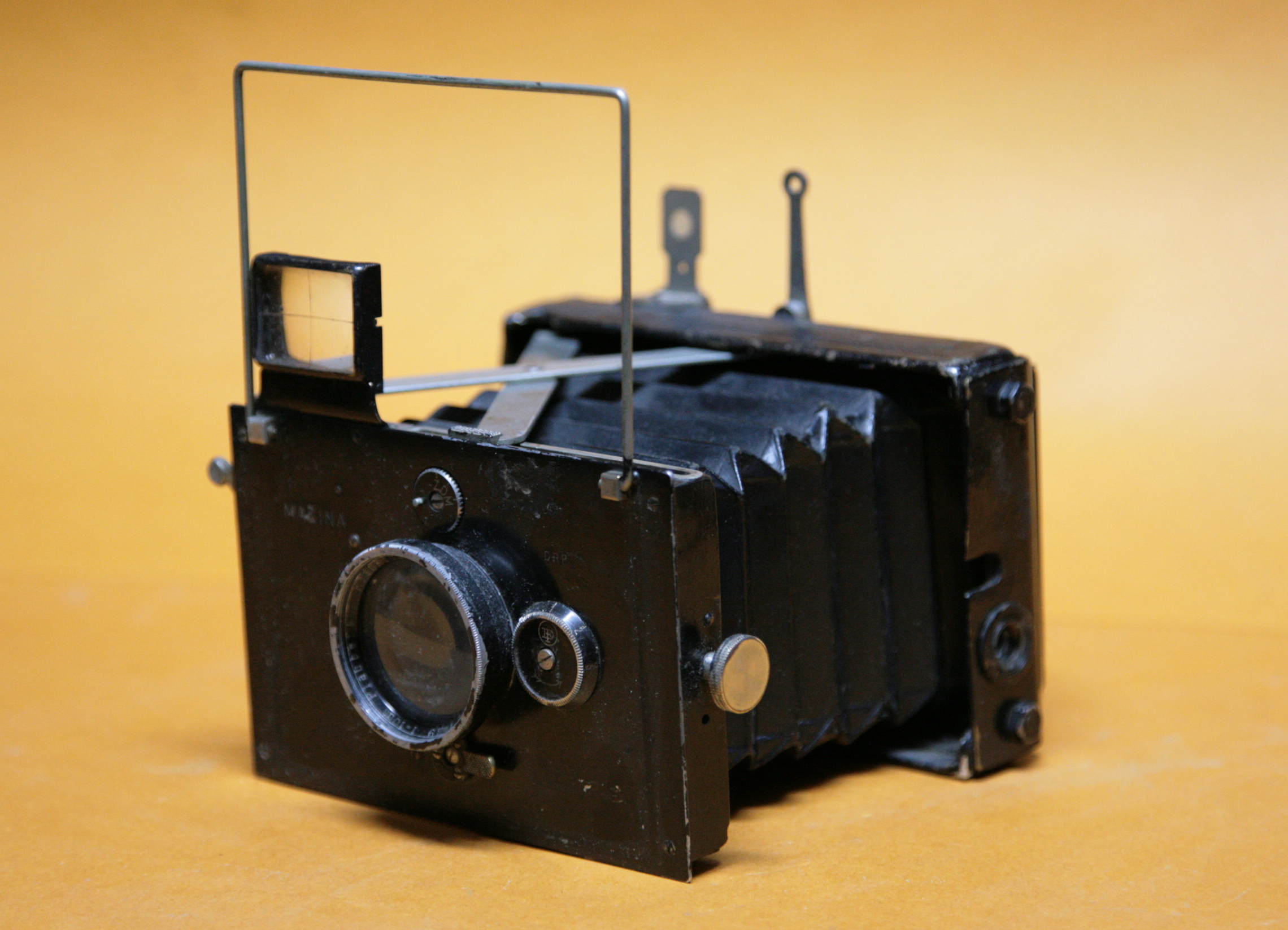
Plaubel Makina press camera from year 1912 with standard Plaubel Anticomar 7.5cm f3 lens, format 4.5x6cm film plate

Plaubel (Plaubel & Co, later Plaubel GmbH) was a German camera maker, founded in Frankfurt in November, 1902, by Hugo Schrader, who learned the technology of cameras and lenses as an apprentice at Voigtländer in Braunschweig in the late 1800s before being employed by a Frankfurt camera and lens manufacturer and distributor, Dr. R. Krügener, whose daughter he married. Hugo Schrader and his wife elected to open their own business, Plaubel & Co., as distributors and makers of cameras and lenses, naming it after his brother-in-law because he thought Plaubel was easier to remember than Schrader.

Its first product catalog was published for Christmas of 1902 and included cameras of all sizes and makes plus many accessories. In 1912 Hugo Schrader introduced the first Plaubel Makina, a compact bellows camera with a scissors-struts design. It evolved into a press camera before production was stopped 48 years later. In 1908 the Schraders had a son, Goetz, who was to become the future mainstay of the firm. He entered Plaubel in 1925 as an apprentice and became head of the technical department and in charge of camera development in 1930. A year later he became co-owner with his father. After the death of Hugo Schrader in 1940, Goetz Schrader took over the management of the company.

During World War II Plaubel was converted to manufacture precision military gear but was bombed and seriously damaged in 1944. After World War II ended in 1945, Schrader designed and produced a number of large-format Peco monorail studio view cameras. In 1961 Plaubel introduced the Makiflex and Pecoflex, 9x9cm/6x9cm/6x6cm SLR cameras, with focal-plane shutters and revolving backs, and (together with the American firm Burleigh Brooks) the Veriwide 100, a 6x10cm roll-film viewfinder camera with a fixed ultra-wide lens. In 1975, Schrader sold the company to the Japanese Kimio Doi Group. Plaubel is especially known for their 6x7 Plaubel Makina roll film cameras. In the middle of 1970's, the Makina scissors-strut camera was succeeded by a Japanese-built Makina 6x7 with Nikkor lens, first shown in exhibition in 1977 and released in 1978. The wide-angle "sister", Makina W67 came in 1982. Later the type changed to 670, adding modifications like the 220 film capability and a hot shoe. Production of the Makina 6x7 stopped in 1986. Goetz Schrader died in 1997 but Plaubel continued to produce large format monorail cameras like the Peco Profia and still serviced and repaired these cameras until 2017. They also made a 6×9 cm/2-14x3-1/4 inch medium-format Peco monorail view camera for digital and roll film photography (PL69D).

== Cameras ==
=== Film plates or cut film ===
==== Studio View Cameras ====
- Peco Junior 9x12, for 9 x 12 cm/10 x 15 cm/4" x 5" large format plates and sheet films, and 2-1/4" x 3-1/4"/ 2-1/4" x 2-1/4" roll film medium formats (1960); bellows view camera on a 320 mm-long (12-1/2") flat optical bench monorail with rack teeth and tripod socket; swings, tilts, and rise/fall/side shifts for front standard, swings and tilts on optical axis for rear standard plus revolving back; detachable bellows allows camera to be folded flat for transport or storage; ground-glass geared focusing; interchangeable leather pleated bellows and wide-angle bag bellows; wire frame for focusing cloth; quick-change lens boards; spirit levels on rear standard; accessory shoes on front and rear standards; all-metal construction of camera standards and monorail; used with plates, sheet-film, roll-film; weight: ca. 2.5 kg (about 5-1/2 lbs) without lens and shutter; 1962 list price, NYC, $239.50 less lens
- Peco Junior 6x9, for 6.5 x 9 cm / 6 x 9 cm / 6 x 6 cm / 4.5 x 6 cm / 2-1/4" x 3-1/4" / 2-1/14" x 2-1/4" medium format plates, sheet film and roll film, and 24 x 36 mm (35 mm) format (1959); bellows view camera on a 250 mm-long (ca. 10") flat optical bench monorail with rack teeth and tripod socket; rise/fall and side shift (but no swing) on front standard, swings and tilts on rear standard plus revolving back; ground-glass geared focusing; interchangeable leather pleated bellows and wide-angle bag bellows; collapsible ground-glass hood; quick-change lens boards; spirit level on rear standard; accessory shoes on front and rear standards; all-metal construction of camera standards and monorail; used with plates, sheet-film, roll-film and 35mm cassettes; weight: ca. 1.5 kg (about 3-1/4 lbs) without lens and shutter; 1962 list price, NYC, $160.00 less lens
- Peco Profia, a series of eight large-format bellows view cameras, mounted on optical bench tubular or flat monorails of different lengths, varying in format from 9 x 12 cm (4" x 5") to 18 cm x 24 cm (8" x 10"); model designations for 9 x 12 cm (4" x 5") are "V", "N" and "Z", for 13 x 18 cm (5" x 7") they are "V", "N" and "Z", and for 18 x 24 cm (8" x 10") they are "N" and "Z"; all models introduced between 1967 and 1968; all can be used with plate, sheet-film and roll-film and are capable of smaller formats down to 35 mm with appropriate accessories; ground-glass focusing; all models are distinguished by four vertical tubular poles, two suspending the lens panel between them and two suspending the rear standard between them, enabling independent rise-fall movement of each standard by moving it up and down the poles; all Profia "Z" models provide two extra 10-cm-long pole extensions for increased rise/fall capability; separate controls on each standard for shift, tilt and swivel; revolving back on rear standard; common lens board size (165 x 165 mm) for 90 mm or longer lenses for all models, or wide-angle lens board (120 x 120 mm) with reducing board (165 x 165 mm, recessed 17 mm) for 65 mm to 47 mm super-wide lenses; each model features interchangeable pleated bellows or soft wide-angle bag bellows; detachable bellows allow cameras to be folded flat for transport or storage; each model offers selection of different interchangeable or extendable monorail lengths (the "V" models have flat rails, the "N" and "Z" models have triple-grooved tubular rails and accept extension rails at each end) which range from 32 cm (approx. 12") to 70 mm (approx. 30"); many accessories; weight varies depending on format; 1976 factory prices, without lens, ranged from 952 DM to 3,281 DM
- Peco Supra, for 10 x 15 cm/9 x 12 cm/6.5 x 9 cm/6 x 6 cm/4.5 x 6 cm/4" x 5"/ 2-1/4 x 3-1/4"/ 2-1/4" x 2-1/4" large and medium formats (1954, discontinued in 1960); bellows view camera on a 500 mm-long (ca. 20") extendable flat optical bench monorail with rack teeth on extension sections atop each end, carrying the front and rear standards; swings, tilts, and rise/fall shifts on front standard, tilts and swings on rear standard plus revolving back; ground-glass geared focusing; fixed pleated leather bellows, or front-detachable to allow folding flat for transport or storage; quick-change lens boards; spirit levels on rear standard; all-metal construction of camera standards and monorail; used with plates, sheet-film, and roll-film; list price, not available
- Peco Universal III, for 18 x 24 cm/13 x 18 cm/ 12 x 16,5 cm/ 10 x 15 cm/ 9 x 12 cm, 6,5 x 8 cm/ 6x 6 cm/ or 8" x 10"/ 5" x 7"/ 4" x 5"/ 2-1/4" x 3-1/4"/ 2-1/4" x 2-1/4" large and medium formats (1960); bellows view camera on a 550 mm-long (26") tubular optical bench monorail with locking tripod collar; swings, tilts, rise/fall and side shifts for both front and rear standards; front-standard shoe for compendium; ground-glass focusing plus revolving back; interchangeable pleated leather bellows and wide-angle bellows; quick-change lens boards; all-metal construction of camera standards and monorail; used with plates, sheet-film and roll-film; camera conversion kit enabled 4" x 5" and 5" x 7" cameras to be converted to 8" x 10" format; 1962 list prices, NYC, ranged from $350 for the 4" x 5" model to $510 for the 8" x 10" model
- Peco Profia PL 1, for 9 x 12 cm to 6 x 7 cm (4" x 5" to 2-1/4 x 2-3/4") large and medium format sheet film, roll film or optional Plaubel 4" x 5" digital adapter PL70; international 4" x 5" back available (2012); bellows view camera with black front and rear L design standards (instead of U-shaped brackets) mounted on a black non-extendable 45 cm (18") tubular rack-and-pinion optical bench monorail, or optional 30 cm (12") or 75 cm (30") similar monorails; revolving back on rear standard; precision drives; center and base adjustments; zero detents; depth-of-field calculator; interchangeable standard pleated 9 x 12 cm (4" x 5") bellows ca. 55 cm (30") long for focal lengths from 110 mm; wide-angle bag bellows for focal lengths starting at 35 mm; flat lens board 165 mm x 165 mm (ca. 6-1/2" x 6-1/2"); locking tripod coupling collar; weight, 5.8 kg (ca. 12 lbs.) without lens or digital adapter; 2012 list price for the basic camera, without lens, starts at 2,375 Euros
- Peco Profia PL69D, for 6 x 9 cm to 24 x 37 mm / 2-1/4" x 3-1/4" to 35 mm medium and small film formats or optional Plaubel 6x9 digital adaptor PL69 (2012); bellows view camera with black front and rear L design standards (instead of U-shaped brackets) mounted on a black 30 cm (12") or 45 cm (ca. 18") optical bench tubular monorail; optional 30 cm (ca. 18") extension monorail; precision drives; center and base adjustments; zero detents; revolving back; three interchangeable 6 x 9 cm (2-1/4" x 3-1/4") black pleated bellows: standard is ca. 25 cm (ca. 10") long for focal lengths starting at 120 mm, optional extra-long pleated bellows is ca. 45 cm (ca. 18") long; and optional wide-angle bag bellows is ca. 15 cm (ca. 6") long for lenses ranging from 90 mm to 105 mm, or as short as 35 mm with the 24 mm-recessed lens board; all lens boards are 120 mm x 120 mm (ca. 5" x 5") but no lens boards are included in the camera price; tripod coupling collar; weight, 4.3 kg (ca. 8-1/2 lbs.) without lens or digital adaptor; 2012 list price for the basic camera, without lens or lens board, starts at 4,150 Euros, plus 1,420 Euros for the PL69D digital adaptor
- Peco Profia NT, available in three metric format sizes: 9 x 12 cm (to 6 x 7 cm with adaptor), 13 x 18 cm, and 18 x 24 cm; and three US formats: 4" x 5", 5" x 7", and 8" x 10"; all use a monorail bellows view camera design with fully adjustable front and rear U-shaped standard supports having center and base movements mounted on a black 45 cm (18") optical bench tubular monorail; optional 45 cm monorail extension with mm scale; focusing is friction-driven; revolving back; international film backs available; interchangeable standard pleated and wide-angle bellows; minimum focal length for the standard bellows is 115 mm for all formats; minimum focal length for the wide-angle bellows with tube is 45 mm for all formats; length of the 9 x 12 cm / 4" x 5" bellows is about 55 cm (ca. 22"); length of the 13 x 18 cm / 5" x 7" bellows is about 60 cm (ca. 24"); length of the 18 x 24 cm / 8" x 10" bellows is about 65 cm (ca. 26"); the flat lens board is 165 mm x 165 mm (ca. 6-1/2" x 6-1/2"); tripod coupling collar; weights without lens: 5.8 kg (ca. 12 lbs.) for the 9 x 12 cm / 4" x 5" camera; and 6.4 kg (ca. 14 lbs) for both the 13 x 18 cm / 5" x 7" and 18 x 24 cm / 8" x 10" cameras; 2012 list prices range from 1,705 Euros to 3,345 Euros, plus options and lenses
- Peco Profia ZT, upgraded version of Profia NT, with precision drive, available in three metric format sizes: 9 x 12 cm, 13 x 18 cm, and 18 x 24 cm; and three US formats: 4" x 5", 5" x 7", and 8" x 10"; all use a monorail bellows view camera design with fully adjustable front and rear U-shaped standard supports having center and base movements mounted on a black 45 cm (18") optical bench tubular monorail; optional 45 cm monorail extension with mm scale; focusing is friction-driven; revolving back; international film backs available; interchangeable pleated and wide-angle bellows; minimum focal length for the standard bellows is 115 mm for all formats; minimum focal length for the wide-angle bellows with tube is 45 mm for all formats; length of the 9 x 12 cm /4" x 5" bellows is about 55 cm (ca. 22"); length of the 13 x 18 cm / 5" x 7" bellows is about 60 cm (ca. 24"); length of the 18 x 24 cm / 8" x 10" bellows is about 65 cm (ca. 26"); the flat lens board is 165 mm x 165 mm (ca. 6-1/5" x 6-1/2"); tripod coupling collar; Note that weights are heavier than the NT cameras; weights without lens: 6.3 kg (ca. 13 lbs) for the 9 x 12 cm / 4" x 5" camera; 6.9 kg (ca. 15 lbs) for the 13 x 18 cm camera; 7.9 kg (ca. 17-1/2 lbs) for the 18 x 24 cm / 8" x 10" camera; 2012 list prices range from 2,475 Euros to 4,204 Euros, plus options and lenses.

==== 4.5×6 strut folding ====
- Baby Makina

==== 6.5×9 strut folding ====
With adaptors for 120 film.

- Makina I
- Makina II
- Makina III
- Makina IIIR

==== 45×107mm stereo strut folding ====
- Stereo Makina 45×107

==== 6×13 stereo strut folding ====
- Stereo Makina 6×13

=== roll film (120 & 220) ===
==== 4.5×6 folding ====
- Roll-Op and Roll-Op II (4.5×6 version)

==== 6×6 folding ====
- Roll-Op and Roll-Op II (6×6 version)

==== 6×7 strut folding ====
- Makinette 67
- Makina 67
- Makina W67
- Makina 670

==== 6×9 view finder ====
- 69W ProShift (with Schneider Super-Angulon 5,6/47 mm ultra-wide-angle lens)

==== 6×9 monorail view cameras ====
- PL69D

==== 6×10 Wide-Angle Camera ====
- Brooks-Plaubel Veriwide 100 (1959 - 1965); compact super-wide-angle roll-film camera with 100-degree field of view; designed in USA by Frank Rizzatti of Burleigh Brooks Inc. and manufactured in Germany by Plaubel; reportedly only 2,000 copies were built; camera body size: 4" x 6" x 1-1/2"; weight: 34 ounces; seven images 6 cm x 10 cm (2-1/4" x 3-1/2") on 120 roll-film; film advance by knob on top of camera, with automatic frame-by-frame stop; frame counter window and shutter release with cable release socket on camera top; fixed six-element Schneider Super-Angulon f:8/47mm ultra-wide-angle lens; helical zone focusing with click stops at six feet and 20 feet; extreme depth of field (when set at 10 feet, depth extends from 4-1/2 feet to infinity); diaphragm stops from f/8 to f/32; no rangefinder; built-in flip-up wire finder with parallax adjustment on rear component; optional custom precise 100-degree Zeiss optical finder fits shoe on top of camera; Synchro-Compur leaf shutter, fully synchronized with M and X settings, built-in self-timer, speeds from 1 second to 1/500th second plus B; manual cocking; double exposure prevention; standard tripod socket in camera base; most units have three spirit levels for critical monitoring of horizontal, vertical and tilt positioning

==== Large Single Lens Reflex ====
- Makiflex - large single-lens reflex bellows camera (1963) uses interchangeable adapters to produce 9 cm x 9 cm (3-1/2" x 3-1/2") square images on 9 cm x 12 cm (or 4" x 5") plates or sheet-film, or 6 cm x 9 cm (2-1/4" x 3-1/4") oblong images, vertical or horizontal, on plates, sheet-film or roll-film, or 6 cm x 6 cm (2-1/4" x 2-1/4") square images on 120 roll-film; rotating camera back for easy vertical or horizontal composition changes; special quiet focal-plane shutter, with speeds from four seconds to 1/500th second; hand-triggered mirror to minimize chance of vibration; automatic spring diaphragm; square 120 mm x 120 mm (4-3/4" x 4-3/4") lens boards are interchangeable; ground-glass focusing screen in camera topside, with interchangeable folding viewfinder hood equipped with 2.5x magnifier lens; focusing uses a twin 70-mm-long rack-and-pinion drive; minimum focal length - about 125 mm; maximum focal length - about 360 mm; lens standard is rigid with no adjustments other than focusing; bellows is not detachable
- Pecoflex - large single-lens reflex bellows camera (1963), similar to Makiflex, except it replaces the twin rack-and-pinion focusing drive with an optical bench monorail with rack teeth and tripod socket; both the camera body and the lens standard can be ratcheted back and forth separately on the monorail; an adjustable view-camera-type front standard allows lens rise/fall, tilt and shift adjustments but not swing; bellows is interchangeable

=== 127 film ===
- Makinette (3×4)

=== 35mm film ===
- Makinette 35P, prototypes only

=== 16mm film ===
- Makinette 16, prototypes only

== Lenses ==
- Anastigmat-Tele-Peconar
- Anticomar
- Heli-Orthar
- Triple-Orthar
