= Speed Graphic =

Press cameras made by Graflex from 1912 to 1973

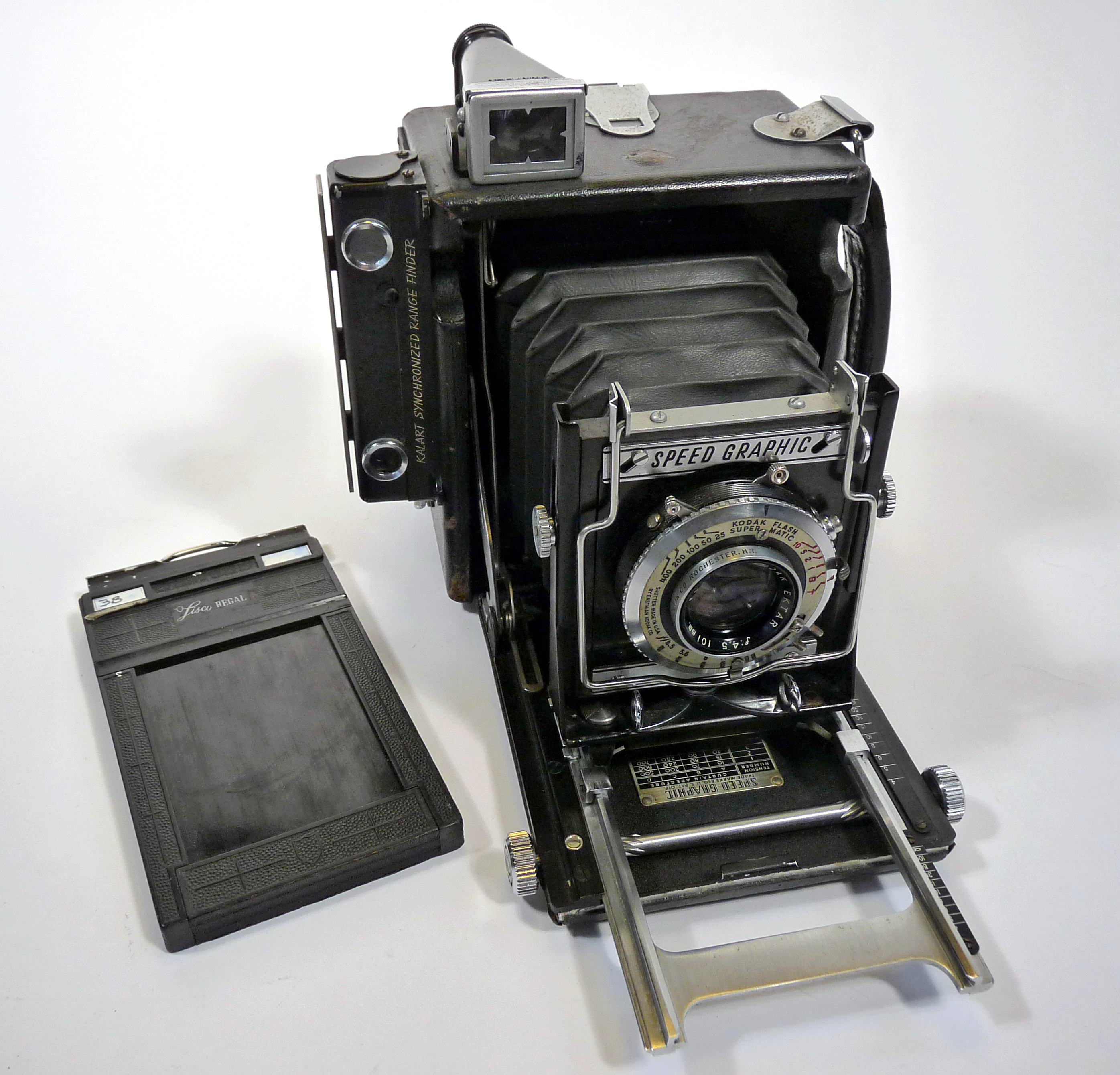
Graflex Speed Graphic format: 2.25''×3.25'' medium format, Miniature Speed Graphic, early 40s. lens: Ektar F4.5, 101mm, focal plane shutter

The Speed Graphic was a press camera produced by Graflex in Rochester, New York. Although the first Speed Graphic cameras were produced in 1912, production of later versions continued until 1973; with significant improvements occurring in 1947 with the introduction of the Pacemaker Speed Graphic (and Pacemaker Crown Graphic, which was one pound [0.45 kg] lighter and lacked the focal plane shutter).

== Description ==
Despite the common appellation of Speed Graphic, various Graphic models were produced between 1912 and 1973. The authentic Speed Graphic has a focal plane shutter that the Crown Graphic and Century Graphic models lack. The eponymous name "speed" came from the maximum speed of 1/1000 sec. that could be achieved with the focal plane shutter. The Speed Graphic was available in 2¼ × 3¼ inch, 3¼ × 4¼ inch, 5 × 7 inch and the most common format 4 × 5 inch. Because of the focal plane shutter, the Speed Graphic can also use lenses that do not have shutters (known as barrel lenses).

Using a Speed Graphic, especially with the rear shutter system, was a slow process. Setting the focal plane shutter speed required selecting both a slit width and a spring tension. Each exposure required the photographer to change the film holder, open the lens shutter, cock the focal plane shutter, remove the dark slide from the inserted film holder, focus the camera, (Note: The Speed Graphic typically had several methods to focus. This sequence describes using the quick framing view finder on the top of the camera, the wire front and rear peepsight, or the optional added rangefinder. If a ground glass plate were used to focus it would be in place of the film holder, so focusing was done on the ground glass prior to the insertion of the film and removal of the dark slide.) and release the focal plane shutter. Conversely, if the lens shutter were used, the focal plane shutter (on the Speed Graphic and Pacemaker Graphic models with both shutters) had to be opened prior to cocking using the "T" or TIME setting, and then releasing the shutter in the lens. If indoors, the photographer also had to change the flashbulb. Each film holder contained one or two pieces of sheet film, which the photographer had to load in complete darkness. Faster shooting could be achieved with the Grafmatic film holder—a six sheet film "changer" that holds each sheet in a septum. Even faster exposures could be taken if the photographer was shooting film packs of 12 exposures, or later 16 exposures (discontinued in the late 1970s). With film packs one could shoot as fast as one could pull the tab and cock the shutter, and film packs could be loaded in daylight. A roll film adapter that used 120 or 220 film was available for 2.25 × 3.25, 3.25 × 4.25 and 4 × 5 inch cameras that permitted 8 to 20 exposures per roll, depending on the model of the adapter. Photographers had to be conservative and anticipate when the action was about to take place to take the right picture. The cry, "Just one more!" if a shot was missed was common. President Harry Truman introduced the White House photographers as the "Just One More Club."

=== Operation of the focal plane shutter ===
The focal plane shutter consists of a rubberized flexible curtain with slits of varying widths that cross the film plane at speeds determined by the tension setting of the spring mechanism. There are 4 slits with widths of 1/8 in, 3/8 in, 3/4 in, 1 1/2 in and “T” (T = “time” setting, used when lens diaphragm shutter is used to control exposure duration. The focal plane shutter is left completely open until manually released. The opening covers the entire area of the film for the size of the camera.) On Speed Graphic models, there are 6 tension settings, adjusted by a butterfly winding knob that increases the speed that the slit crosses the film plane. On Pacemaker Graphic models, there are only 2 settings (high and low). The combination of the slit width and the spring tension allows for exposure speeds varying from 1/10 to 1/1000 sec.

Slit width (inches)	1/8	3/8	3/4	1 1/2	T
Tension 1	1/350 sec.	1/110 sec.	1/40 sec.	1/10 sec.	(open)
Tension 2	1/440 sec.	1/135 sec.	1/50 sec.	1/15 sec.	(open)
Tension 3	1/550 sec.	1/160 sec.	1/65 sec.	1/20 sec.	(open)
Tension 4	1/680 sec.	1/195 sec.	1/75 sec.	1/25 sec.	(open)
Tension 5	1/825 sec.	1/235 sec.	1/80 sec.	1/30 sec.	(open)
Tension 6	1/1000 sec.	1/295 sec.	1/90 sec.	1/35 sec.	(open)

== Famous users ==
A famous Speed Graphic user was New York City press photographer Arthur "Weegee" Fellig, who covered the city in the 1930s and 1940s.

The Speed Graphic was the standard issue camera used by the U.S. Army Signal Corps during World War II, despite its size and film format making it awkward to use and maintain in combat scenarios.

Barbara Morgan used a Speed Graphic to photograph Martha Graham's choreography.

Recent auctions show Irving Klaw used one in his studio for his iconic pin up & bondage photos of models such as Bettie Page.

In the 1950s and 1960s, the iconic photo-journalists of the Washington Post and the former Washington Evening Star shot on Speed Graphics exclusively. Some of the most famous photographs of this era were taken on the device by the twin brothers, Frank P. Hoy (for the Post) and Tom Hoy (for the Star).

The 1942-1953 Pulitzer Prizes for photography were taken with Speed Graphic cameras, including AP photographer Joe Rosenthal's image of Marines raising the American flag on Iwo Jima in 1945. A few winning photographs after 1954 were taken with Rolleiflex or Kodak cameras. 1961 was the last Pulitzer Prize-winning photograph with a Speed Graphic, which taken by Yasushi Nagao showing Otoya Yamaguchi assassinating Inejiro Asanuma on stage.

In 2004, American photojournalist David Burnett used his 4×5 inch Speed Graphic with a 178 mm f/2.5 Aero Ektar lens removed from a K-21 aerial camera to cover John Kerry's presidential campaign. Burnett also used a 4×5 inch Speed Graphic to shoot images at the Winter and Summer Olympics.

== Graflex manufacturing history ==
The company name changed several times over the years as it was acquired and later spun off by the Eastman Kodak Company, finally becoming a division of the Singer Corporation and then dissolved in 1973. The award-winning Graflex plant in Pittsford, New York is still standing and is home to Veramark Technologies, Inc., formerly known as the MOSCOM Corporation.

Years	Manufacturer
1887-1904	Folmer and Schwing Manufacturing Co., NY, NY
1905-1927	Folmer & Schwing Div., Eastman Kodak Co. Rochester, NY
1928-1946	Folmer Graflex Corp., Rochester, NY
1946-1955	Graflex Inc., Rochester, NY
1956-1968	Graflex Inc., Div. General Precision Equipment, Rochester, NY
1968-1973	Graflex Inc., Div. Singer Corporation
1973	Tooling bought by Sakai Special Camera Mfg. Co., Ltd., manufacturers of the Toyo View camera

== Graflex model history ==
The Speed Graphic was manufactured in a number of sizes, 4×5" being the most common, but also in 2.25×3.25", 3.25×4.25" and 5×7".

Years produced	Model name and description	Notes
1958-1973	Super Graphic	Same features as the Super Speed Graphic, but without the Graflex-1000 1/1000 front shutter.
1961-1970	Super Speed Graphic	Graflex-1000 1/1000 lens shutter, all metal body, including flash computer, electric shutter release, front standard had swing capability, & featured revolving back. (NO focal plane shutter!)
1947-1973	Pacemaker Crown Graphics (4×5, 3.25×4.25, 2.25×3.25)	Identical to the Pacemaker Speed Graphic, but made without the focal plane shutter, which reduced weight, and increased access to wide-angle lenses.
1947-1970	Pacemaker Speed Graphics (4×5, 3.25×4.25, 2.25×3.25)	Post-war production brought coated lens and lenses in shutters, body release, folding infinity stops. Side-mounted rangefinder replaced by top rangefinder on 4×5" Graphics in 1955.
1949-1970	Century Graphic (2.25×3.25)	The plastic bodied 'Century Graphic' and mahogany/metal 'Crown Graphic' were without focal plane shutters. Imported 2.25" cameras led to the design of the roll film holders, and the Graflok back (1949). Flat bar viewfinder, followed by flexible wire viewfinder. Side-mounted rangefinder replaced by top rangefinder on 4×5" Graphics in 1955. Trim on face of Pacemaker bodies is found on top, sides, and bottom.
1940-1946	Anniversary Speed Graphic (3.25×4.25 and 4×5")	No grey metal exposed, satin black with chrome trim. Wartime model: no chrome. Bed and Body track rails linked, allowing focusing of wide angle lens within body. Solid wire frame viewfinder. Trim on face of body is found only on top and sides.
1939-1946	Miniature Speed Graphic (1st small 2.25×3.25" model)	wire hoop viewfinder has curved top. Early Kalart rangefinder. Focal plane shutter.
1928-1939	Pre-Anniversary Speed Graphic (3.25×4.25, 4×5, 5×7)	4×5 - wire hoop viewfinder has curved top. There is no trim on the front of the body, unlike later models. Early Pre-Anniversary models retained the "flip-up" optical viewfinder, but later ones were produced with the tubular viewfinder. These tubular viewfinders were also available as an after-market accessory, and many early Pre-Anniversary models carry tubular viewfinders as replacements for original flip-up viewfinders.
1912-1927	Top Handle Speed Graphic 3.25×4.25, 4×5, 3.25×5.5, 5×7	Early cameras have very small lensboards and do not accommodate the larger, fast lenses (e.g. f/2.9 and larger) that came out in the 1920s

== See also ==
- Graflex
- Press camera
