= Film holder =

Device to hold photographic film

A film holder is an accessory that holds one or more pieces of photographic film, for insertion into a camera or optical scanning device such as a dedicated film scanner or a flatbed scanner with film scanning capabilities. The widest use of the term refers to a device that holds sheet film for use in large format cameras, but it can also refer to various interchangeable devices in medium format or even 135 film camera systems.

== Sheet film holders ==
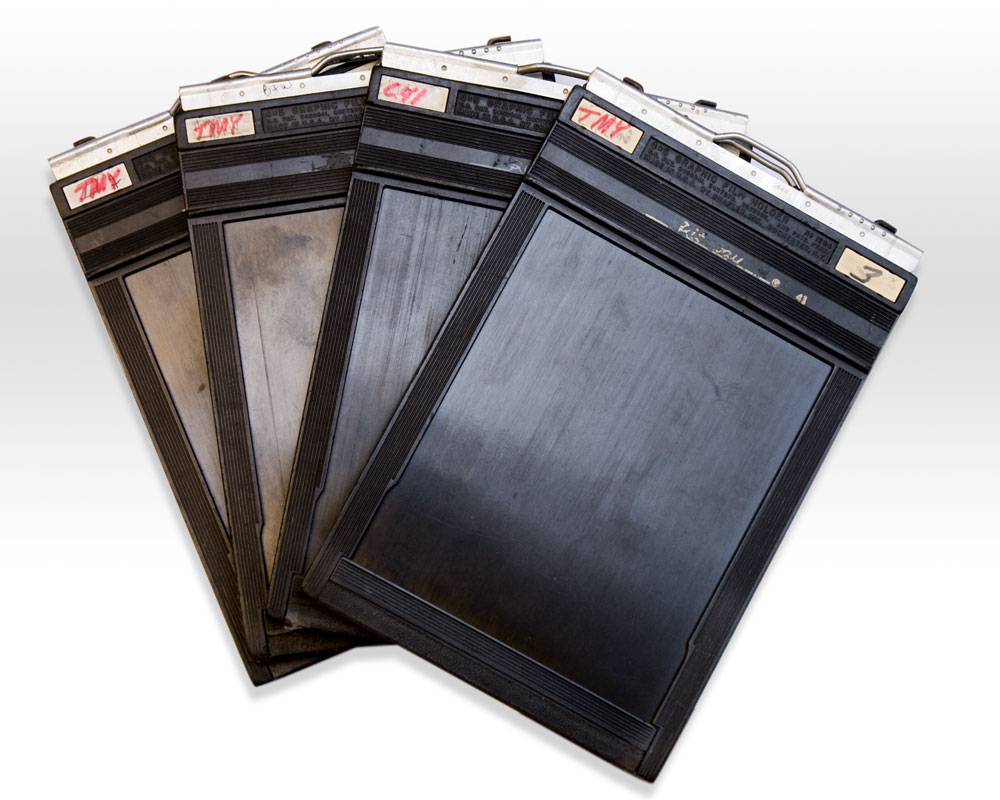
Graflex 4×5 Sheet Film Holders.

The most common instance of film holder is the sheet film holder. Also referred to as a dark slide or double dark slide, they are flat devices, slightly larger than the films they hold, which commonly hold one sheet of film on each side. The plate holder, which is a very similar device, holds glass plates instead of sheet film. A dark slide, from which the device derives its alternate name, is simply a dark cover that slides into a recess in the holder to protect the film (or plate) from exposure to light. Many dark slides have differently colored bands or handles on each side, one usually light and the other dark, so the photographer can distinguish between exposed and unexposed film.

Traditionally, sheet film and glass plate holders have been made out of wood. Wooden holders, properly treated, can last a very long time, and apart from possible warpage, many very old specimens are still in service. Some companies continue to make wood models today, particularly for more uncommon film sizes, and as many are mostly handmade, they can be quite expensive. The majority of new sheet film holders are now made out of plastic.

When using a sheet film holder, the device is inserted into the camera, often a view camera, and the dark slide is withdrawn, making the film available for exposure. After the exposure has been made, the dark slide is reinserted into the film holder, and the device is removed from the camera for later processing of the exposed film.

=== Multi-sheet holders ===
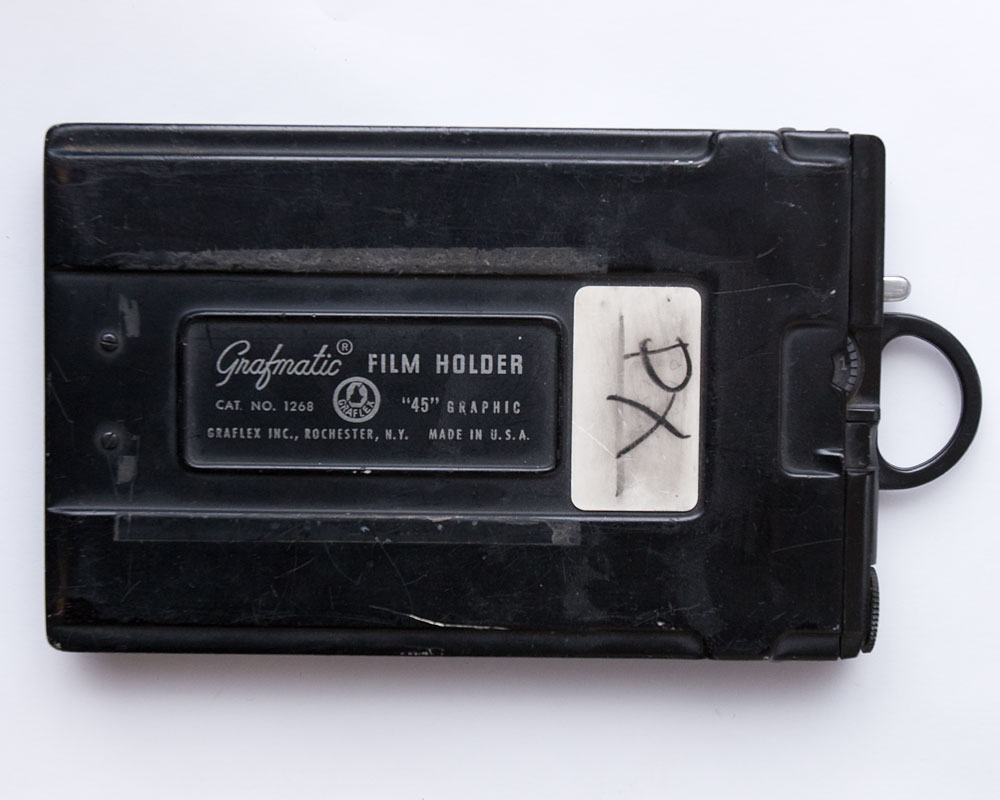
Grafmatic "45" Film Holder.

Some film holders can hold more than two sheets. One of the most common is the Grafmatic, manufactured by Graflex, which holds six sheets of film in individual septums. They were available in "23" and "45" models, corresponding to 6×9 cm (2 1/4×3 1/4 inches) and 4×5 inch sheets. It takes little effort to quickly cycle through all six sheets, which makes the Grafmatic ideal for press camera usage. Burke & James produced a similar device called the Kinematic, which holds 10 sheets, though was only available in 4×5 inch format.

Graflex also produced the Film Magazine. It is commonly referred to as a "bag magazine" (or "bag mag"), and uses a leather bag that hangs on the side of the frame to exchange the septums from front to back. It is a much more manual device than the Grafmatic, as exchanging a septum is done manually through the bag, rather than by a simple manipulation of the magazine's dark slide. They were sold in separate versions for film and glass plates, and held 12-18 sheets/plates, depending on the model. They are found in 3×4, 4×5, and 5×7 inch formats.

Though all are superficially similar (a "bag mag" film (not plate) septum is the same thickness as a Grafmatic septum, but has slightly different width and length; a Kinematic septum appears almost identical to a Grafmatic septum but is in fact considerably thinner) in fact use of a septum from a different type of holder in any of these multi-sheet holders is very likely to jam the entire magazine and bend internal parts, which can then damage yet another holder if used with it. As replacement parts are no longer available one must be careful not to interchange pieces of different types of multi-sheet holders.

Fuji created a 4×5 system in the late 1990s called QuickChange, which is somewhat similar to a Grafmatic in principle. It is made of plastic rather than metal, making it lighter, and less prone to bent septums, but also less durable. It can hold 8 shots, and inserts are purchased already loaded with film. Though not sold as such, these inserts can be reloaded a limited number of times with standard sheet film. Because, like Grafmatic or "bag mag" holders, the Fuji holders used sheet film of normal thickness, they offered higher image quality than the older "film packs" (see below), but never became widely popular before digital imaging brought much production of traditional large-format materials to a halt.

=== Film pack holders ===
Graflex and Polaroid produced film pack holders that could be loaded in subdued light. Film packs were available from various film manufacturers in 12 and 16-sheet units. The classic film pack consisted of several "sheets" of film (actually much thinner than standard sheet film, as they were cut from large-format roll film, for economy and physical flexibility) taped together and wound in a series of S-bends around a metal frame. To "advance" the film, the user pulled a paper tab that protruded from the side of the film pack. The tab was attached—facing the opposite direction—to the junction of each sheet and its intervening section of tape. The thin film and only slight tension this system provided resulted in poor film flatness, and negatives are often sharp enough only for contact printing. They were primarily used by press photographers, and demand fell off dramatically as photojournalists converted to roll film cameras.

According to former Kodak employees at the Eastman House photographic museum, Kodak stopped producing film packs when the last employee trained to assemble them (which required working with the very sharp metal frame in total darkness) retired in the 1980s. This rendered all traditional film pack holders in the world obsolete at once. Polaroid film packs, though mechanically similar, are not (and never were) available in standard film sizes. The Fuji QuickChange system was sometimes referred to as a film pack system but, as noted above, was a mechanical multi-sheet holder.

=== Instant film holders ===
Polaroid produced the widest range of instant sheet and pack film, but discontinued all production in 2008, leaving Fujifilm as the only producer of instant film and backs. The Polaroid 545, the lighter and more modern 545i, and the 545 Pro backs were 4×5 inch instant sheet film holders that many photographers used. New55 Holdings, LLC started producing a black and white P/N film for the 545 and 545i backs. This new instant sheet film produces a black and white negative and a positive image. The older Polaroid 550 packfilm back can take Fuji FP-100C film (3.25x4.25 inches), which was the last product of this type and was discontinued in February 2016. Polaroid also produced 8×10 inch film holders and films. Polaroid produced 10-sheet 4×5 inch instant film packs and holders.

=== Preloaded systems ===
Some 4×5 inch films come in light-tight envelopes that can be loaded into a special holder in daylight. The envelopes are much smaller and lighter than a dark-slide loaded with film, so a photographer can carry a larger quantity of film than the same amount of film in dark-slides. Fuji Quickload TM film and holders, and Kodak Readyload TM film and holders, are of this type. These have not been manufactured for several years, although old stock may sometimes be sold online. New55 Holdings, LLC has started producing a variety of Ready Loads called 1SHOT TM for the preloaded systems, these include Black and white negative, color negative and color slide films.

=== Rollfilm holders ===
Film holders that adapt rollfilm to sheet film cameras are usually called film backs. Film backs for 4×5 inch cameras are particularly common—there is little point in taking 6×9 cm pictures on a 20 cm × 25 cm (8 in × 10 in) camera. Horseman, Linhof, Graflex, and other manufacturers have made roll film holders in 6×7, 6×8, 6×9, 6×12, and 6×17 cm formats. Some models can slip under the ground glass like a normal sheet film holder, while others require that the photographer replace the ground glass with the roll holder.

== Medium format film holders ==
Film holders are available as accessories for some medium format cameras. The most usual case is the Polaroid back taking instant film, often used to check exposure values, color rendition, etc. before taking final photographs on conventional film.

Several of the types of holders made for large format film, including darkslide sheet holders, Grafmatic multi-sheet holders, the Graflex bag mag, and film packs were also manufactured in medium format sizes, almost always 2 1/4"×3 1/4" (6×9 cm). Press camera manufacturers often produced smaller versions of their 4×5 cameras in this size, often called "23", and while later versions of these cameras could use rollfilm adaptors, these were not widely available until almost 1950, and were expensive in their first years of production.

Sheet film or glass plate holders for medium format rollfilm cameras can be found, but are of mainly historical interest. Some rollfilm cameras have interchangeable backs to accommodate different film types. Some 35mm cameras have motorised backs that hold longer than normal film lengths, with a mechanism that automatically advances the film after each exposure.

== See also ==
- Film formats
- Film scanner
- Large format
- Medium format
- Photographic plate
- Sheet film
