= Komamura =

Komamura may refer to:

- Shunsuke Komamura (駒村 俊介, born 1979), Japanese cross-country skier
- Sajin Komamura, a soul reaper in the Bleach series
- Komamura Corporation, a company producing cameras
