= F24 camera =

British large format aerial camera

The Williamson F24 camera is a camera used for aerial reconnaissance by British and Allied armed forces from 1925 through into the mid-1950s, most particularly during World War II. It is also sometimes referred to as F.24 or F-24.

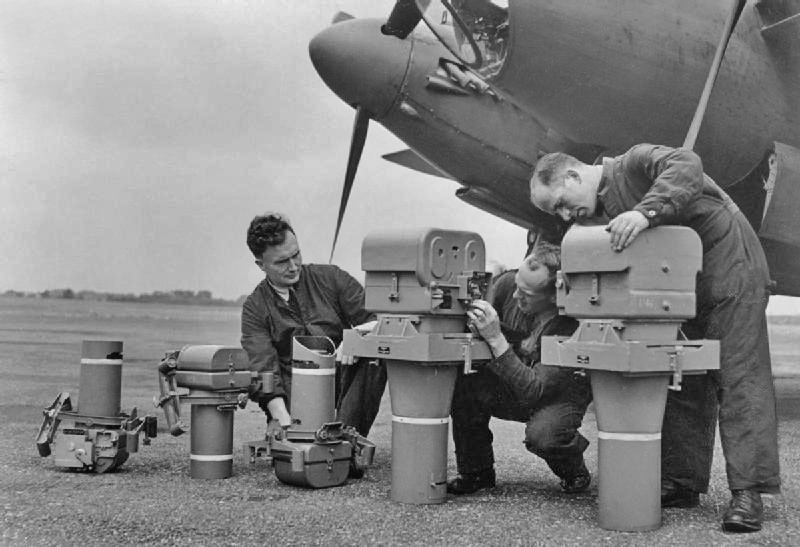
Photographers at RAF Benson testing cameras before installing them in a PR Mosquito: (left to right) two F24 14-inch lens vertical cameras, one F24 14-inch lens oblique camera, two F52 vertical cameras with 20-inch lenses

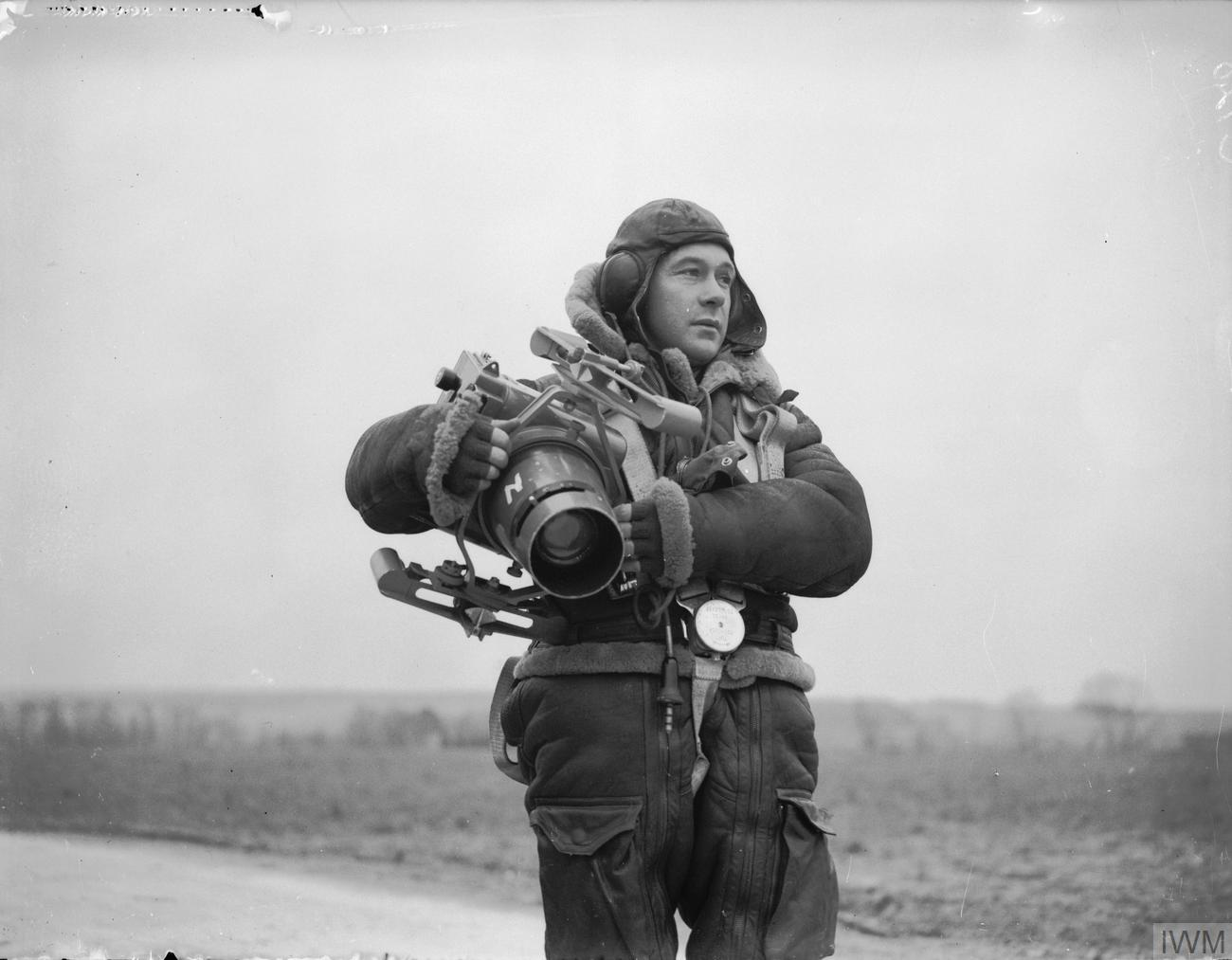
RAF airman carrying a hand-held version of F24 camera, France

== Design and development ==
The outline design of the F24 camera was carried out by the Royal Aircraft Establishment at Farnborough, and it was introduced in 1925. Detailed design, and most production, was by Williamson Manufacturing Company Ltd of Willesden Green, London NW.10. The F24 was designed to be lighter and smaller than the F8 camera of 1919, but the F8 continued to be used in less demanding installations. The main component units of the F24 are a body with roller blind focal plane shutter, gearbox, film magazine, and lens cone. Image film format is 5"×5", on 5" wide roll film, with magazine capacity up to 250 exposures (the F8 offered images up to 8"×7.5" on 9" wide film). Shutter speed is preset between 1/100s and 1/1000s.

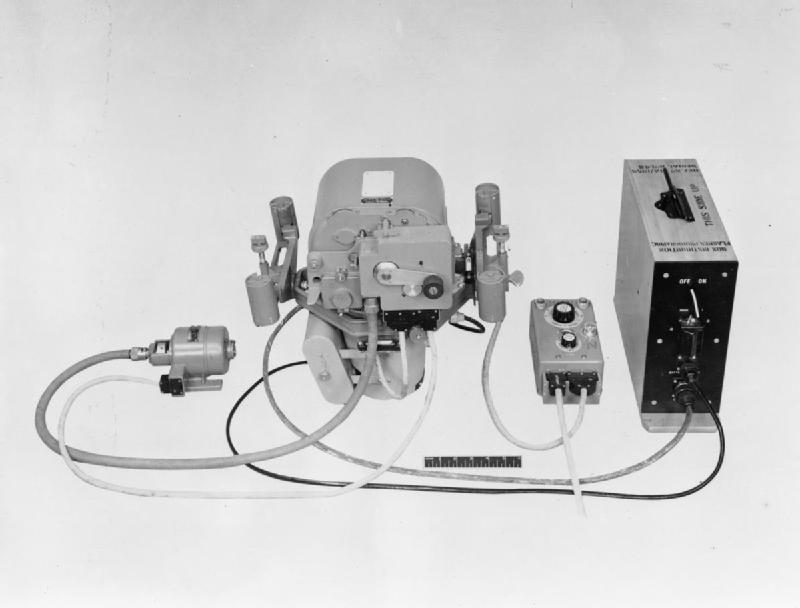
F24 Mk. 1 motorized camera for night photography, to the right is a Type 35 camera control unit

By about 1940, most configurations of the F24 included a Dallmeyer Pentac lens with focal length 8", aperture f/2.9, with either a Type 21 hand adaptor with two side handles, or a Type 25 fixed mounting and Type 35 control box and motor drive. Weight of a typical hand-held version is about 20 lb. Prior to 1940, available lenses included focal lengths of 3.25" (f/5.6), 5" (f/2.8), 6", 10.5". In 1937, a 14" (f/5.6) lens was introduced, followed in late 1940 by a 20" (f/5.6) lens, and in 1942 by a 36" lens. Longer lenses, and larger image formats, offered more detailed images from extremely high altitudes.

During the Second World War, the F24 was also manufactured by Vinten. A modified but compatible version with lower weight was designed and manufactured by Eastman Kodak as the K-24, for use by US forces. Also in 1942, the F24 was developed into the F52 that used an image format of 8.5"×7", magazines up to 500 exposures, and was better suited for 36" and 40" lenses in larger installations.

== Operational history ==
During the Second World War, the F24 was installed in aircraft types including; Avenger, Blenheim, Catalina, Corsair, Halifax, Hellcat, Hudson, Hurricane, Lancaster, Liberator, Lysander, Maryland, Meteor FR.9, Mitchell, Mosquito, Mustang, Spitfire, Stinson, Stirling, Sunderland, Wellington.

== See also ==
- Aerial photography
- Aerial reconnaissance
- Fairchild K-20

== Bibliography ==
- Cotton, Sidney (1969). Aviator Extraordinary: The Sidney Cotton Story. Chatto & Windus. ISBN 0-7011-1334-0.
- Nesbit, Roy Conyers (1996). Eyes of the RAF. Sutton Publishing. ISBN 0-7509-1130-1.
