= Graflex =

American camera manufacturer (1887-1973)

Graflex, Folmer and Schwing Manufacturing Company
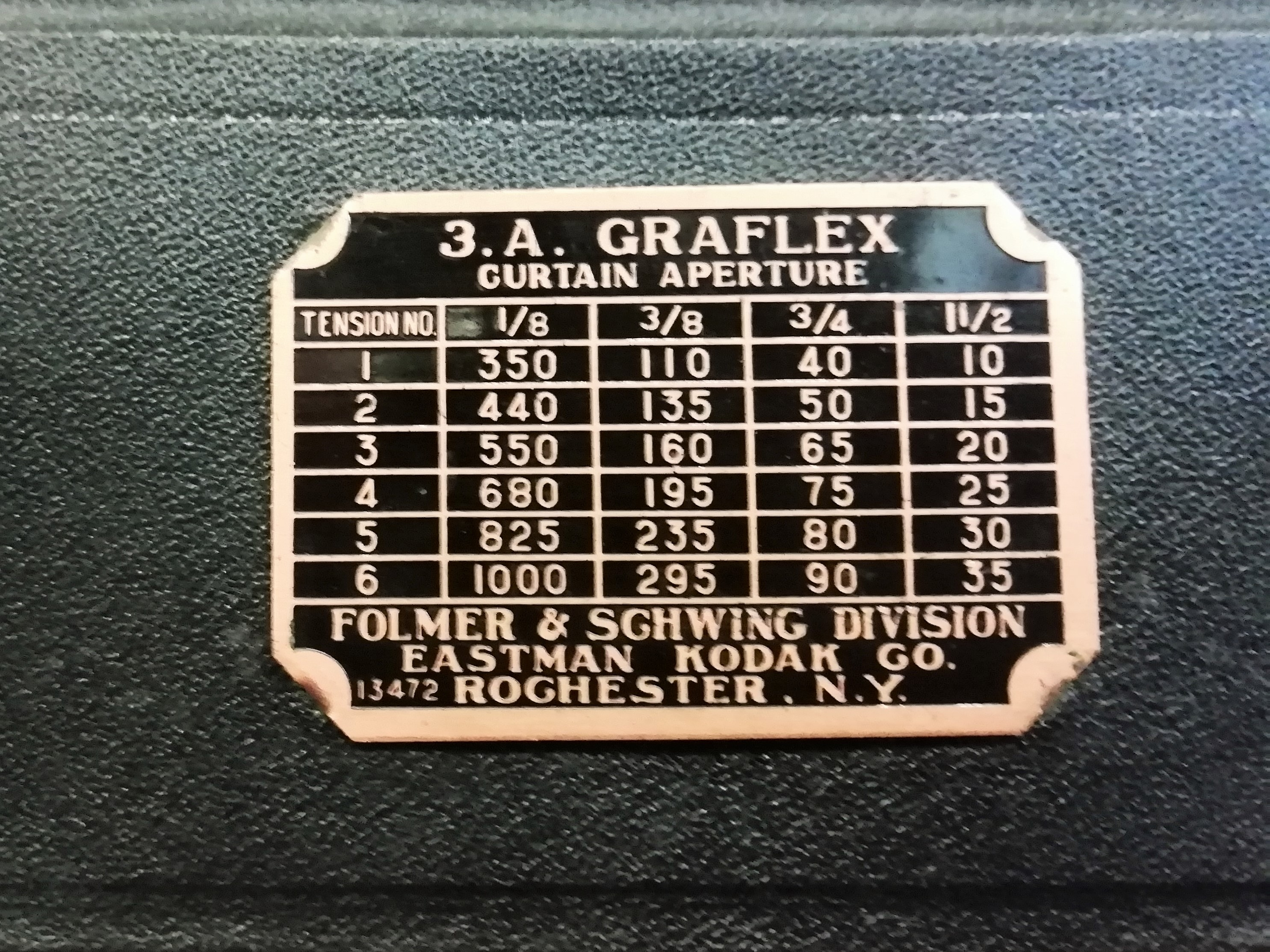
- Type: Large format and medium format press cameras and lens manufacturer
- Industry: photography
- Founded: 1887; 139 years ago
- Defunct: 1973
- Headquarters: New York City, USA
- Key people: William F. Folmer and William E. Schwing, founders
- Products: Cameras, Optical and other products
- Number of employees: 700
- Parent: Eastman Kodak Company (1909), later Singer Corporation (1968)

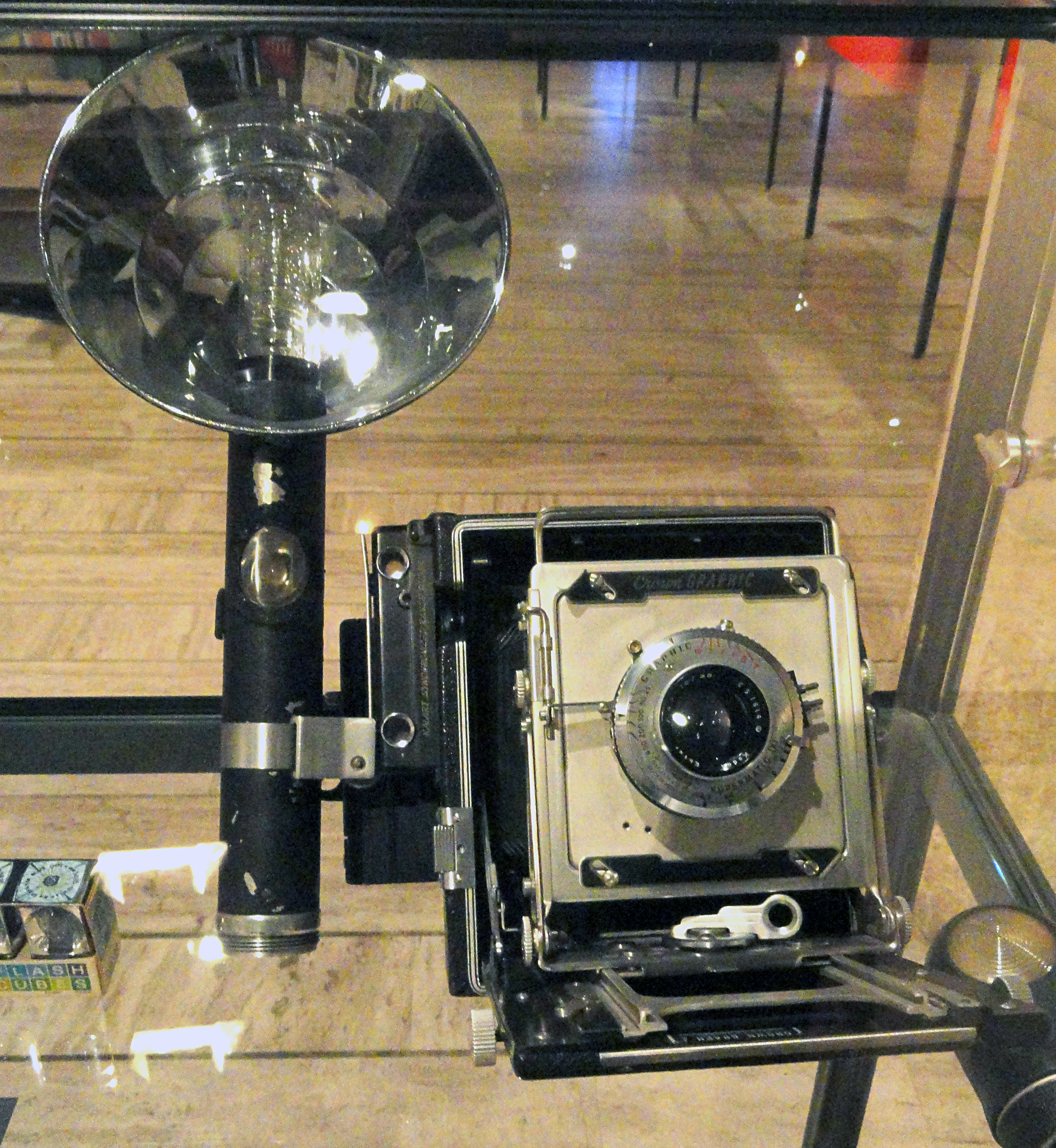
Graflex Pacemaker Crown Graphic, 1947

Graflex was a manufacturer that gave its brand name to several camera models.

The company was founded as the Folmer and Schwing Manufacturing Company in New York City in 1887 by William F. Folmer and William E. Schwing as a metal working factory, manufacturing gas light fixtures, chandeliers, bicycles and eventually, cameras.

In 1909, it was acquired by George Eastman, and the company was moved to 12 Caledonia Avenue (later renamed Clarissa Street) in Rochester, New York in 1928. It operated as the Folmer & Schwing Division of the Eastman Kodak Company.

In 1926, Kodak was forced to divest itself of the division, which was spun off forming a new company, the Folmer Graflex Corporation, which changed its name to Graflex Inc. in 1946. In 1956, it became a Division of the General Precision Equipment Corporation, and moved its offices to Pittsford, New York outside Rochester. In 1968, the company was sold to the Singer Corporation.

Graflex was known for the quintessential press camera, the Speed Graphic which was manufactured for over 60 years, and was used by most of the photojournalists in the first half of the 20th century.

== History ==
William F. Folmer, an inventor, co-owned the Folmer and Schwing Manufacturing Company, founded in New York City as a gas lamp company. As the gas lamp market declined, the company expanded into other areas including bicycles and photographic equipment, leading to the release of the first Graflex camera in 1899. As the company's success grew, it chose to focus on photography and dropped its other manufacturing lines, and in 1905 was acquired by George Eastman, in 1907 becoming the Folmer Graflex Division of Eastman Kodak. After a succession of name changes, it finally became simply "Graflex, Inc." in 1945. Eastman Kodak made all of the Graflex cameras in their professional equipment manufacturing plant on Clarrisa street in Rochester NY. In 1926, as a result of violations of the Sherman Anti-Trust Act (Comp. St. § 8820 et seq.) Kodak was forced to divest itself of its professional equipment division, which became Graflex Inc. This company existed under independent ownership until 1958, when the company was bought by the General Precision Equipment, which operated it as an independent division until 1968, when it was sold to the Singer Corporation, who also operated it as a division until 1973, when it was finally wrapped up and its tooling sold to the Toyo Corporation.

From 1912 to 1973 Graflex produced large format and medium format press cameras in film formats from 2 1/4 by 3 1/4 inches (57 mm × 83 mm) to 4 by 5 inches (100 mm × 130 mm) . They also produced rangefinder, SLR and TLR cameras in a variety of formats ranging from 35mm to 5 by 7 inches (130 mm × 180 mm).

The Rochester Folmer plant also manufactured the Century Studio Camera, which was marketed under both the Kodak and Graflex nameplates. However, because Graflex printed separate catalogs for its studio and portable offerings, many erroneously believe the Century Studios to have been manufactured elsewhere.

=== Graflex Reflex cameras ===
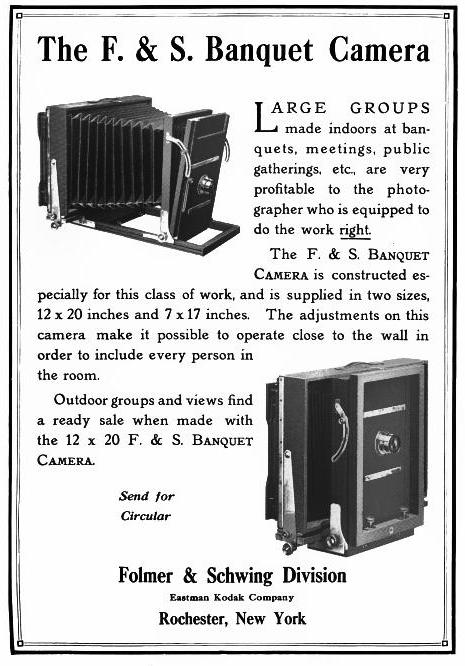
1914 ad for the Folmer and Schwing "Banquet Camera"

The first of the Graflex-branded cameras, released in 1898, was the Graflex camera, also known as the Graflex Reflex, or Graflex single lens reflex (SLR). This camera used the same swinging-mirror, through-the-lens viewing mechanism as modern single lens reflex cameras, introduced many decades later, and quickly became popular for sports and press photography in the early 20th century due largely to its use of a focal plane shutter. To produce shutter speeds fast enough to appear to freeze rapid motion, early Graflex cameras employed a cloth shutter with a narrow slit that quickly moved across the film plane, exposing only one small strip at any given moment in its travel. To set the shutter speed, the photographer wound the shutter spring to one of a series of calculated tensions using a key, and selected the slit width with another control. A table on the side of the box gave the shutter speed for each combination. The Graflex Reflex was also popular among early 20th Century fine art photographers, leading several lens manufacturers to design special soft-focus lenses, including the famous Wollensak's Verito, to support the camera's creative potential.

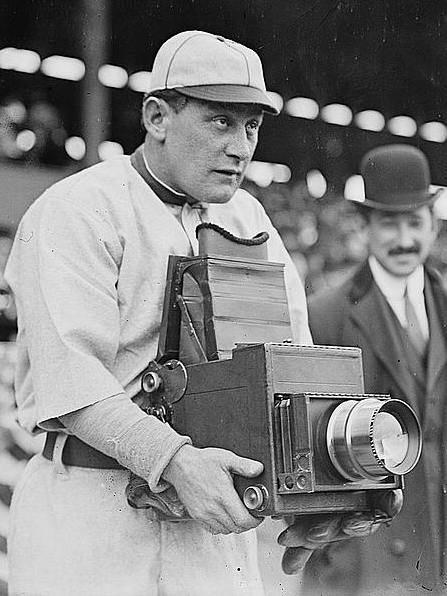
5x7 Press Graflex camera in 1911

=== Speed Graphic and Crown Graphic press cameras ===
Graflex Speed Graphic folding cameras, produced from 1912 to 1973 also employed a focal plane shutter, but omitted the SLR swinging mirror and through-the lens viewing, replacing it by an external viewfinder, while retaining a view camera's traditional ground glass for static subjects. This allowed the camera to be considerably lighter, and fold into a rugged boxy shape. These cameras could also be used with "between-the-lens" shutters mounted to the front lens board as more typically seen on large format cameras. The Speed Graphic became even more popular than the Graflex Reflex as a press and sports camera, so much so that to this type of classic press camera features in the masthead of the New York Daily News. The top-to-bottom motion of the focal plane shutter exposed the upper portion of the film first (i.e., the bottom of the inverted image as seen at the focal plane), so many photographs of automobile racing taken with Speed Graphics depicted the wheels of cars in an oval shape leaning forward. This feature was so ubiquitous in racing photography that it came to be a conventional graphical indication for speed, influencing many cartoonists who drew wheels in this same style to indicate fast motion.

Speed Graphics have also been used by fine art photographers and they work with special un-shuttered lenses that were manufactured originally for the Graflex Reflex.

The Crown Graphic models of this same period were similar in overall design to the Speed Graphics, but omitted their focal plane shutter, allowing Crown Graphic models to be about one inch (2.5 cm) smaller and 1 pound lighter (.5 kg) Furthermore, their lack of a focal plane shutter allowed lenses to be mounted closer to the film plane, enabling the use of wider angle lenses on these models.

== Graflex cameras ==
=== Press cameras ===
- 1912–1973 Speed Graphic Models
- 1912–1927 Top Handle Speed Graphic
- 1928–1939 Pre-Anniversary Speed Graphic
- 1939–1946 Miniature Speed Graphic
- 1940–1946 Anniversary Speed Graphic
- 1947–1970 Pacemaker Speed Graphic
- 1947–1973 Pacemaker Crown Graphic
- 1949–1970 Century Graphic
- 1958–1973 Super Graphic
- 1961–1970 Super Speed Graphic

=== Other large format and SLR cameras ===
- 1907–1923 Press Graflex - 5 by 7 inches (130 mm × 180 mm)
- 1909–1941 Auto Graflex
- 1923–1952 R.B.Graflex Series B (R.B. for Rotating Back)
- 1938–1942 Crown View
- 1941–1949 Graphic View
- 1949–1967 Graphic View II
- 1912–1940 5x7 Home Portrait Graflex
- 1923–1932 5x7 Series B Graflex
- 5x7, 3x5 Compact Graflex
- 5x7 Stereo Graflex
- 1928–1947 3x4 and 4x5 Series D
- 1941–1963 Super D Graflex
- 3x4 Series C Graflex with Cooke 2.5 Lens
- 3x4 and 4x5 RB Auto Graflex
- 4x5 Naturalist Graflex

(Graflex Century Studio portrait Cameras)

=== Other 120/220 and 70mm film cameras ===
- 1933–1941 National Graflex Series I, Series II
- 1952–1956 Graflex 22
- 1965–1973 Graflex XL
- 1953–1957 Combat Graphic
- 1971–1976 Graflex Norita (a.k.a. Norita 66)

=== 35mm rangefinder and stereo ===
- 1949–1953 Graflex Ciro 35
- 1955–1962 Graflex Stereo Graphic
- 1955–1957 Graflex Graphic 35
- 1957–1961 Graflex Century 35
- 1959–1963 Graphic 35 Electric (a.k.a. Iloca Electric)

=== Aerial cameras ===
- 1941–1945 Folmer Graflex K-20 Aircraft Camera (a.k.a. Fairchild K-20)
- Folmer Graflex K-21 Aircraft Camera
- Folmer Graflex K-25 Aircraft Camera

=== Military cameras ===
- 1940–1943 Graflex C-3
- 1942–1944 Graflex PH-47-F
- 1942–1944 Graflex PH-47-E
- 1947–1949 Graflex PH-47-H
- 1947–1950 Graflex C-6
- 1949–1952 Graflex PH-47-J
- 1953–1957 Graflex KE-4
- 1953–1955 Graflex KE-12
- 1965–1973 Graflex XLRF KS-98B

The company name changed several times over the years, as it was absorbed and released by the Kodak empire—finally becoming a division of the Singer Corporation. It dissolved in 1973. The Graflex plant in suburban Pittsford, New York still stands at 3750 Monroe Avenue, and was the corporate headquarters of Veramark Technologies from 1997 to 2010.

| Years | Manufacturer |
|---|---|
| 1887–1904 | Folmer & Schwing Manufacturing Co. of New York, NY |
| 1905–1907 | Folmer & Schwing Co., Rochester, NY |
| 1907–1927 | Folmer & Schwing Div., Eastman Kodak Co. Rochester, NY |
| 1928–1946 | Folmer Graflex Corp., Rochester, NY |
| 1946–1955 | Graflex Inc., Rochester, NY |
| 1956–1968 | Graflex Inc., Div. General Precision Equipment, Rochester, NY |
| 1968–1973 | Graflex Inc., Div. Singer Corporation |
| 1973 | Tooling bought by Toyo Co. |

== Popular culture and today's usage ==
Because the Speed Graphic had its historical origins as the quintessential press camera prior to the advent of 35mm and digital photography for use by press photographers, some still consider the use of a Graflex obsolete. However, both the Speed Graphic and the Graflex SLR have focal plane shutters that allow use of large un-shuttered barrel lenses. These cameras are now being used by fine art photographers to make images that excel in depth of field control and image detail. As an example, a Kodak Aero Ektar 178 mm f/2.5 lens can be fitted to Speed Graphic 4x5 cameras and used to take soft/sharp photographs with complete control of the depth of focus.

The lightsaber prop used in the 1977 release of Star Wars was a modified 1940s Graflex 3-cell flashgun, which was designed to hold flash bulbs for vintage "Speed Graphic" cameras. The model of the flashgun used in the movie had the patent #2310165 stamped onto the bottom.

A stylized logo of a Speed Graphic camera appears on the flag of the New York Daily News. Graflex, Inc., a company in Jupiter, Fla. manufactures precision optical, electronic, and mechanical devices, mostly for the military.

A Graflex Speed Graphic is plot element in the novel The Antidote by Karen Russell.

== See also ==
- Fairchild K-20 – a World War II-era aerial camera made by Folmer Graflex Corp., which became Graflex Inc. in 1945
- Linhof – similar cameras manufactured in Germany
- Press camera

== Sources ==
- Kingslake, Rudolf, The Rochester Camera and Lens Companies (Rochester NY, Photographic Historical Society, 1974) OCLC 3335854
