= Plaubel Makina =

Series of medium format press cameras

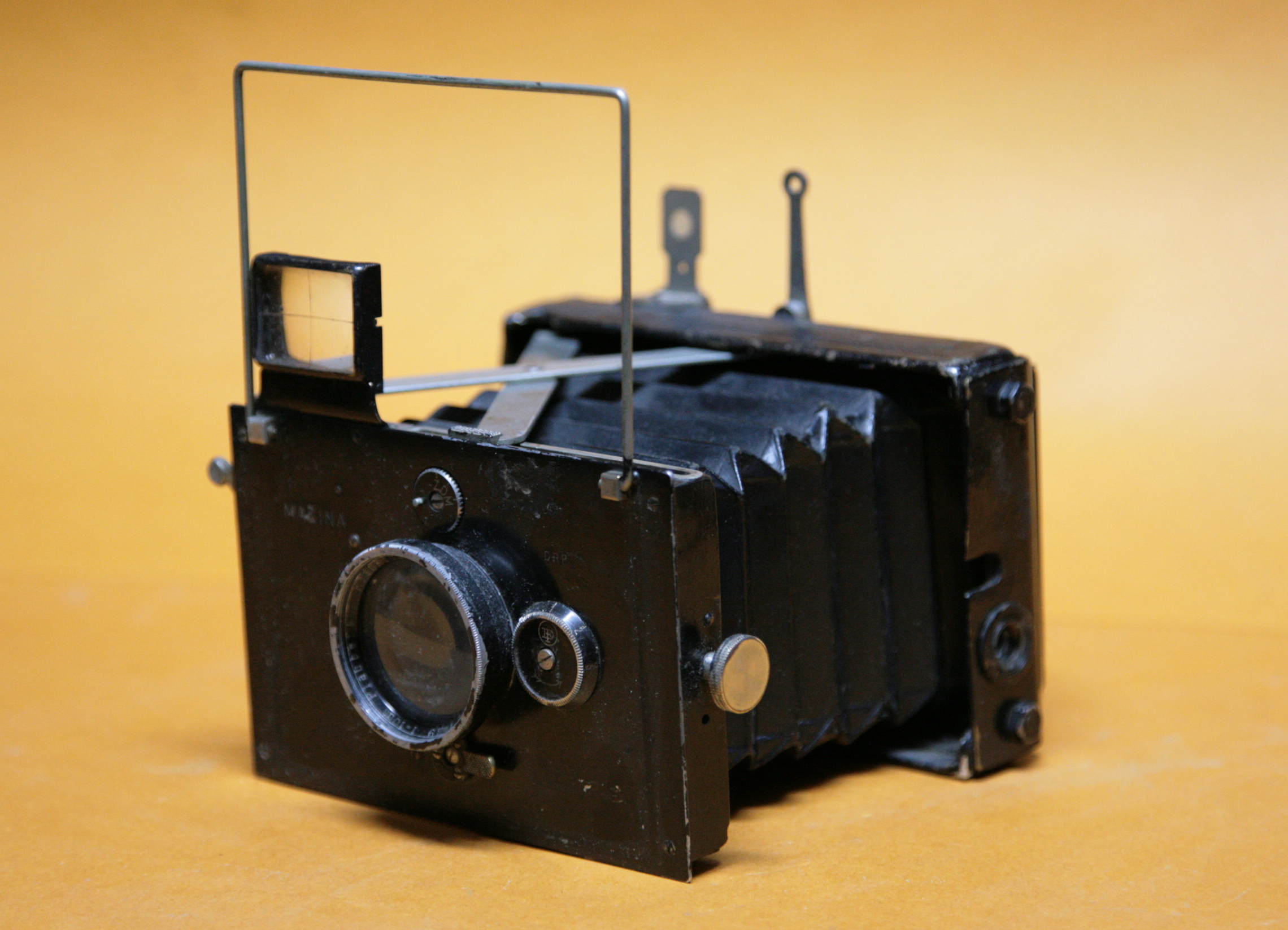
Plaubel Makina press camera from year 1912 with standard Plaubel Anticomar 7.5cm f3 lens, format 4.5x6cm film plate

The Plaubel Makina was a series of medium format press cameras. Makina cameras had leaf shutters and rangefinder focusing with collapsible bellows, except for the specialized 69W Proshift model.

The original Makina was manufactured by Plaubel & Co., in Frankfurt am Main, Germany, from 1912 to 1953. Plaubel was later sold to Doi Group, which designed new Makina cameras that sold from 1978 to the 1980s. The Japanese-made Plaubel Makina was a major redesign with Nikkor lenses and integrated metering. It was manufactured first by Copal and later by Mamiya.

== Plaubel Makina I - III ==
German-made Plaubel Makina models include the 1, 2, 2s, 3, and 3R.

== Plaubel Makina 67, W67 & 670 ==
Models 67 and 670 have Nikkor 80mm f/2.8 lenses. Both models take ten 6×7cm exposures on 120 rollfilm, while the 670 model also accepts 220 rollfilm (20 exposures per roll). Model W67 is similar to the 670 model, but with a wide-angle Nikkor 55 mm lens (roughly equivalent to a 28 mm lens in 135 format). The 55 mm was considered one of the sharpest and most flare-free of any produced during the analogue photography era.

== Plaubel Makina 69W Proshift ==
The 69W Proshift has a 47 mm Schneider Super-Angulon and makes eight 6×9cm exposures per roll of 120 film. The lens is mounted on a sliding flange which allowed for perspective control in the same manner as shifting the front standard of view camera.
