= Fairchild K-20 =

WWII aerial photography camera

The K-20 is an aerial photography camera used during World War II, famously from the Enola Gay's tail gunner position to photograph the nuclear mushroom cloud over Hiroshima. Designed by Fairchild Camera and Instrument, approximately 15,000 were manufactured under licence for military contract by Folmer Graflex Corporation in Rochester, New York between 1941 and 1945.

The K-20 uses a 5.25″×20′ to 5.25″×200′ roll film, with an image size of 4×5 inches. Lenses were 6 3/8″ f/4.5 with an adjustable diaphragm and were non-interchangeable; these were made by Kodak, Ilex, or Bausch & Lomb, as available at the time of order. The camera featured the use of a vacuum to keep the film flat.

Earlier aerial cameras, from the World War I era, included the Kodak K1, with focal-plane shutter, the Fairchild K3, K3A, K3B etc., with in-lens shutter to eliminate distortion, K5 etc., some of which used individual glass plates, some individual sheet film, and some roll film.

Similar cameras, from the World War II era are: K17, K18, K19, K21, K22, F20, F40, F56, etc., many making 9″×9″ or 9″×18″ images using 9″+ roll film.

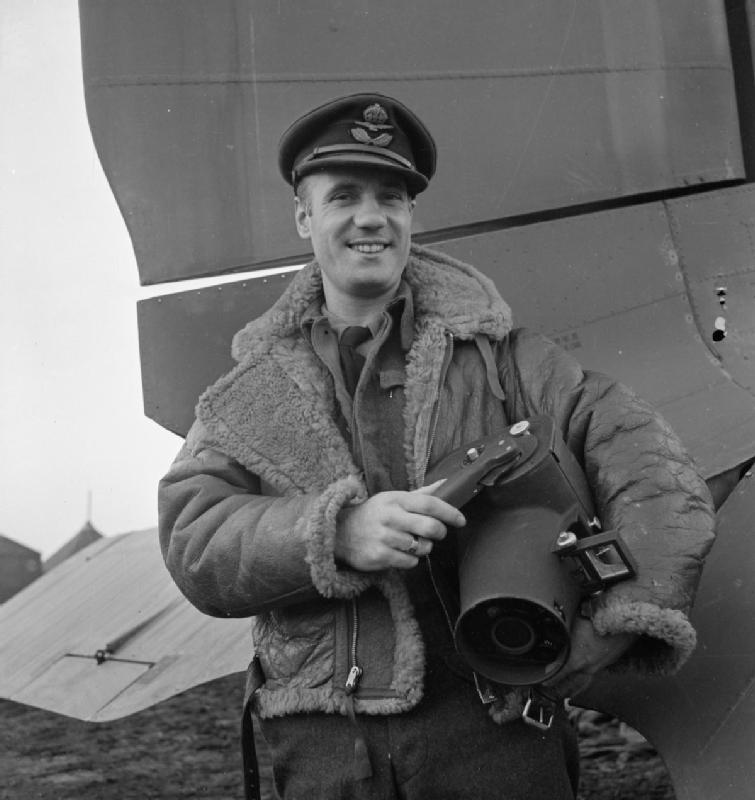
Flight Lieutenant L H Abbott, British Air Ministry official photographer, pictured holding a Fairchild K-20 hand-held aerial camera in front of a Douglas Dakota, World War II

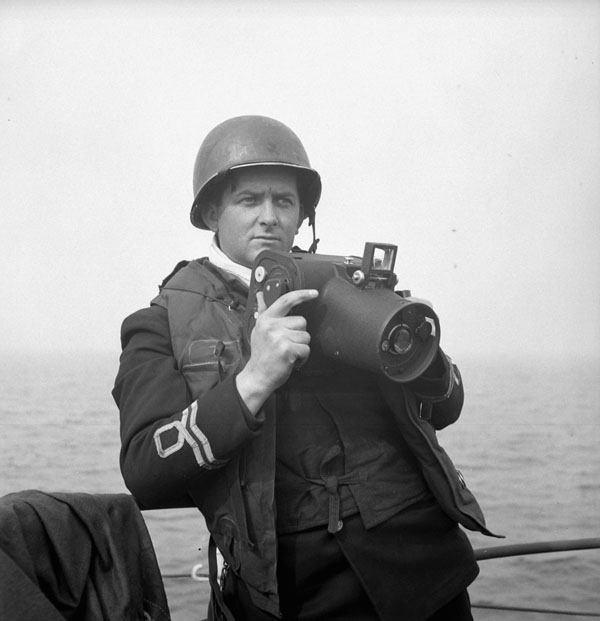
Lieutenant Gilbert A. Milne of the Royal Canadian Naval Volunteer Reserve, holding a Fairchild K-20 camera

== See also ==
- Aerial archaeology
- Aerial landscape art
- Aviation photography
- Bird's-eye view
- F24 camera
- Orthophoto
- Pictometry
- Reconnaissance
