= Frank van Neck =

Frank Lionel Milton van Neck (25 August 1873 – 8 March 1953) was the founder of a firm of manufacturing opticians that later became Peeling and Van Neck, manufacturers of the Van Neck press camera.

Frank van Neck was born in London on 25 August 1873, son of William Grant Neck (1835–1884), a stencil plate engraver, and Louisa Milton (c.1842–1932). He married Annette Rachel Howcroft (1869–1945) in 1899.

He founded Van Neck and Co, manufacturing opticians, around 1897. Their first premises were at 72 Buckingham Gate and 11 Cursiter Street, but by 1910 they had moved to 32 Grays Inn Road. In 1921 they merged with another manufacturing optician, R. E. Peeling, to become Peeling and Van Neck, with workshops at 32 Grays Inn Road and a showroom at 4-6 Holborn Circus.

Peeling and Van Neck Limited of 4-6 Holborn Circus imported photographic and cinematographic cameras, projectors, film and equipment, especially Goerz. In 1927, The Times reported that real advances had been made in colour photography by Messrs. Van Neck and Co in their transparencies made on “Lignosa” [or Lignose] natural colour film packs and roll films, which pre-dated Kodachrome and Agfacolor. The firm was best known for its portable Van Neck press camera which became widely used by press photographers until the 1950s.

The firm remained at Holborn Circus until around 1955, later moving to 79 Turnmill Street and then 120 Albert Street. There is no connection between Frank van Neck and the 1890s Belgian camera maker, Louis Van Neck. Frank van Neck of Norman Cottage, Cookham, died in hospital at Maidenhead on 8 March 1953, leaving £15,634.
