= Mind CTI =

Israeli software company

MIND CTI Ltd.
- Type: Public
- Traded as: Nasdaq: MNDO; Russell Microcap Index component
- Industry: Software; Communication systems; IT; Telecommunications billing; Customer care
- Founded: 1986; 40 years ago
- Headquarters: Yokneam, Israel
- Key people: Meir Nissensohn – Chairperson; Monica Iancu – President and CEO; Ran Mendelaw – CFO
- Products: MINDBill; PhonExOne; gtxmessaging; messagemobile
- Revenue: ▲US$ 21.6 million; fiscal year 2023
- Operating income: ▼US$ 4.7 million; fiscal year 2023
- Net income: ▼US$ 5.2 million; fiscal year 2023
- Total assets: US$ 16.6 million; cash position - end of fiscal year 2023
- Number of employees: ▼144; end of fiscal year 2023
- Subsidiaries: MIND Software SRL; MIND Software, Inc. MIND Software Limited; Mind CTI GmbH; Message Mobile GmbH; GTX Messaging GmbH

MIND CTI Ltd. is a global provider of billing and customer care solutions and messaging services for voice, data, video and content services. Headquartered in Yokneam, Israel; the company also has offices in the United States of America, Iaşi in Romania and in Germany.

== History ==
=== Inception, IPO, and growth history ===
MIND CTI Ltd. was founded in 1995 by the company's current Chief Executive Officer Monica Iancu, née Eisinger, and Lior Salansky in Yokneam, Israel.

==== 2000s ====
In August 2000 the company had an initial public offering on NASDAQ, and in 2002 the company's shares were also listed on the Tel-Aviv Stock Exchange and were included in the TA-100 Index of leading shares for a while, but in November 2009, the company delisted from the Tel-Aviv Stock Exchange (TASE: MNDO) and now is listed exclusive with NASDAQ.

At the time of its initial public offering the company reported revenues of US$ 8.196 million and net income of US$1.514 million for year 1999, and had raised funding of approximately US$15 million from ADC Teledata Communications Ltd., a subsidiary of ADC Telecommunications, and a syndicate of investors including Summit Ventures. The initial public offering yielded net proceeds of US$29.9 million for the company, and in 2001 the company reported revenues of US$15.613 million, net income of US$3.748 million, and working capital of US$46.6 million as of December 31, 2000.

In 2001, the company acquired from Veramark Technologies Inc. all the rights for the VeraBill product line, a mediation, provisioning and billing solution for wireline and wireless mid-size carriers, for US$1 million.

In 2005 the company acquired Sentori Inc., a provider of customer care and billing solutions to rural wireless carriers and MVNOs, mainly in the United States, for an estimated US$4.426 million in cash, noting that the transaction carried a goodwill of US$6.966 million, intangible assets of US$1.871 million, and current liabilities of US$5.062 million.

In 2007, the company acquired Omni Consulting Company Limited (doing business as "Abacus Billing,") a provider of billing and customer care solutions in a service bureau mode, mainly in Europe, for an estimated US$5.972 million in cash (including expenses) and performance related earn-outs providing for payments through the third quarter of 2009 of up to a maximum of approximately US$1.5 million, noting that the transaction carried goodwill of US$3.339 million (not including goodwill from the performance related earn-outs,) intangible assets of US$1.577 million, and current liabilities of US$1.159 million.

From 2007 through 2009, the company encountered difficulties with the investment of a large part of its assets in auction rate securities, causing write-offs of significant investments from 2007 through 2009. However, these write-off were eventually offset through the settlement of an arbitration action against Credit Suisse Group AG. Aggravating the difficulties with the investments, during the 2007 through 2009 time-period, the company experienced difficulties growing, recording no net-new business in 2008.

Subsequent to the 2009 settlement agreement with Credit Suisse Group AG, the company was sued by an individual investor, purportedly in a class action securities lawsuit, relating primarily to the Company's investment in auction rate securities. The lawsuit was dismissed in July 2010.

==== 2010s ====
In 2010, the company resumed its growth, securing new key wins, including wins with tier 1 operators and wins related to the deregulation and emerging MVNO market in Israel.

In 2013, the company announced that it would actively pursue acquisitions that satisfied certain criteria, including proven revenue generation, complementary technology and geography and expected accretion to earnings within two to three quarters.

As of December 31, 2013, the company had no employees in the United Kingdom.

In February 2015, the company started its second location in Romania in the city of Suceava.

In March 2019, the company acquired Message Mobile GmbH, a provider of enterprise messaging, communication and payment solutions, for a total consideration of $3 million, of which $2.25 million was paid in cash and $750,000 was paid in 345,908 Mind CTI shares. In connection with the acquisition, the Company recorded core technology, customer relationships and goodwill in an amount of approximately US$0.3 million, US$0.55 million, and US$2.2 million, respectively. The estimated useful life of the core technology and customer relationships was 10.75 years and 5.75 years, respectively.

In September 2019, the company acquired GTX Messaging GmbH, a provider of enterprise messaging communication solutions, for a total consideration of approximately US$275 thousand in cash. In connection with the acquisition, the company recorded goodwill in an amount of approximately US$0.2 million.

=== Auction Rate Securities ===
==== Mantiloking CDO 2006 and Mind CTI Ltd.'s arbitration claim against Credit Suisse ====
In the years prior to 2009, MIND CTI Ltd. had US$22.8 million, almost two-thirds of its, then, current assets, tied up in collateralized debt obligation (CDO) bond investments issued by Merrill Lynch and structured as auction rate securities (ARSs), which were subsequently written down in their entirety. In September 2009 the company recovered US$18.5 million of the failed investment in an arbitrated settlement with Credit Suisse Group AG, its financial adviser, and, subsequently, in December 2009, the company paid out an extraordinary dividend of US$0.80 per share to its shareholders.

In its Statement of Claim, filed on February 20, 2008, with the Financial Industry Regulatory Authority against Credit Suisse, its investment bank, and certain Credit Suisse employees, the company alleged, among other things, "that the bank was supposed to invest [the company's] funds in highly liquid, highly safe, 28-day auction rate securities, but - without [the company's] authorization - invested the funds ... in a security called 'Mantoloking [ARSs]'" and sought recovery of US$22.8 million.

The arbitration action was related to United States vs. Butler, an indictment of two Credit Suisse bankers, Julian Tzolov and Eric Butler, for, among other things, securities and wire fraud, alleging that Tzolov and Butler represented investments in CDO-ARSs as low risk products, guaranteed by the United States government and concealed or falsified the names of the investments to make it appear that these products were other types of ARSs than CDO-ARSs by removing the term "CDO" from the name of the investment, adding the term "student loan" or "SL," or doing both (Tzolov pleaded guilty to in July 2009 and Butler was convicted in August 2009).

As part of the arbitration settlement, the company was also reimbursed for US$0.4 million of its legal costs related to the arbitration.

==== Suit by Sarit Tamar against Mind CTI Ltd. and certain of the company's directors and officers ====
During 2009 Sarit Tamar, an individual shareholder in the company, filed a purported class action securities lawsuit against the company, certain of the company's officers, and one of the company's directors in the Southern District of New York (case 09-cv-07132-RMB), having allegedly purchased 41,900 shares of Mind CTI Ltd. and suffered losses of $21,262.08 . The complaint sought unspecified compensatory damages for, among other things, alleged misleading statements relating primarily to the Company's investment in auction rate securities. Federman and Sherwood (federmanlaw.publishpath.com) represented the plaintiff and Troutman Sanders represented the company. The company defended itself against the suit, and in July 2010 the United States District Court for the Southern District of New York issued a decision, dismissing the complaint against all defendants without leave to amend.

In the order dismissing the lawsuit, the Court noted that plaintiff had failed to establish a strong inference of scienter and failed to plead facts showing a primary violation of the securities laws.

==== Suit by Mind CTI Ltd. against its accountant, Kesselmann and Kesselmann ====
In 2009, Mind CTI Ltd. severed its ties with Kesselmann and Kesselmann, a PricewaterhouseCoopers firm and the company's accountant during the period that the company invested in auction rate securities, after 12 years of working with the accounting firm.

On or about December 2011, Mind CTI Ltd. brought suit against Kesselmann and Kesselmann, alleging breach of contract, negligence, and breach of fiduciary duty in relation to the company's investment in the auction rate securities. The lawsuit seeks compensation equal to the difference between the compensation it received from Credit Suisse Group AG and the approximately US$20 million written off (for a total of US$1.8 million,) the cost of defending itself the purported class-action suit filed against it in relation to the auction rate securities matter, and the loss of return, economic activity, and goodwill resulting from Kesselmann and Kesselmann's actions. In totality the claim was US$5 million (US$1.8 million for the investment that was written off, US$150,000 in costs related to claims by investors, over US$2 million for loss of interest and yield, and US$1 million for loss of business, goodwill, and waste of administrative resources.)

=== Share Buy-back ===
In September 2008, the company's Board of Directors authorized a plan for the repurchase of up to 2.1 million of the company's shares, in an amount of up to US$2.8 million. As of December 31, 2008, the Company had repurchased 2.1 million shares at a total purchase price of approximately US$1.6 million.

In February 2009, the Board of Directors authorized additional repurchases of the company's shares in the total amount of US$1.2 million pursuant to the 2008 repurchase plan. As of December 31, 2009, the Company had purchased an aggregate amount of 3,165,092 shares at a total purchase price of US$2.8 million.

In November 2009, the Board of Directors authorized a new plan for the repurchase of the company's shares, in an amount in cash of up to US$1.8 million. As of December 31, 2011, no repurchases had been made under this new plan and it became non-active.

In August 2012, the company authorized the re-activation of the 2009 plan allowing for the repurchase of the company's ordinary shares in the open market in an amount in cash of up to US$1.8 million.

=== Dividend ===
For a technology company, MIND CTI Ltd has an unusual dividend policy in that it, based on certain approvals by its board of directors and, in some special situations, the Courts of Israel, pays out ordinary dividends amounting to approximately the company's net income for the previous year (once a year, a cash dividend will be distributed, subject to review and approval by the company's board of directors, and the dividend amount will be equal to the company's EBITDA plus financial income (expenses) minus taxes on income.)

From 2003 the company has issued both ordinary dividends under this policy and extraordinary dividends for a total of US$5.30 per share:

Record Date	Payment Date	Dividend per share (US$) and total (US$ millions)
March 20, 2024	April 4, 2024	0.24 -
March 22, 2023	April 6, 2023	0.24 - 5.2
March 26, 2022	April 4, 2022	0.26 - 5.2
March 18, 2021	April 8, 2021	0.26 - 5.2
March 11, 2020	April 16, 2020	0.24 - 4.8
March 4, 2019	March 28, 2019	0.26 - 5.0
March 8, 2018	March 22, 2018	0.3 - 5.8
March 9, 2017	March 23, 2017	0.32 - 6.2
March 10, 2016	March 24, 2016	0.27 - 4.5
March 12, 2015	March 26, 2015	0.30 - 4.5
March 12, 2014	March 26, 2014	0.24
March 20, 2013	April 3, 2013	0.24
March 12, 2012	March 28, 2012	0.24 - 4.5
February 24, 2011	March 21, 2011	0.32 - 6.0
March 23, 2010	April 12, 2010	0.2 - 3.7
December 22, 2009	December 21, 2009	0.8 - 14.8
March 14, 2008	April 2, 2008	0.2
March 12, 2007	March 28, 2007	0.2
March 10, 2006	March 27, 2006	0.14
February 25, 2005	March 15, 2005	0.24
February 20, 2004	March 8, 2004	0.13
November 7, 2003	November 24, 2003	0.14

In March 2009, the company shares traded at $0.64 per share. In December 2009, the company paid dividends of $0.8 per share. From March 2009 through April 2020, the company has issued $3.73 in dividend per share, for a hypothetical dividend gain of 582% on a share purchase in March 2009.

== Products ==
MIND CTI products include:

- VoIP and NGN Billing
- Convergent Operational and Business Support Solutions (OSS/BSS)
- 3G Mobile Billing solutions
- MVNO and MVNE OSS/BSS solutions
- Broadband and Cable OSS/BSS solutions
- WiMAX Billing solutions
- Integrated Point of Sale solutions for GSM and CDMA operators
- Turnkey Prepaid solutions
- SMS Solutions

== Customers ==
The company's customers include communication providers as well as new service providers in over 40 countries across the globe, including CellCom, EastLink, Romtelecom, Moldtelecom, China Unicom, H3G Italy, Intelco International Telecommunications, Telefónica Del Peru, SingTel, Sri Lanka Telecom, and Verizon.

Historically, the company's OSS/BSS business has targeted tier 2 and tier 3 wireless, wireline, ISP, and cable operators. Lately, however, the company has won deals with tier 1 operators and has won significant MVNO and MVNE centric deals in Israel, and in February 2011, the company announced plans to significantly increase the company's employee base in the first half of 2012 to support new projects and the multiple requests of engineering resources it had received from its growing customer base.

== See also ==
- List of Israeli companies quoted on the Nasdaq
- List of VoIP companies
- Silicon Wadi
- Startup Village, Yokneam
