= Doi (retailer) =

Japanese photographic retailer and distributor

Doi (株式会社ドイ, Kabushiki Kaisha Doi) was a large Japanese retailer and distributor, best known outside Japan as the company that revived the Plaubel Makina 67 camera in the late 1970s and early 1980s.

Its roots go back to Doi Shōten (土居商店), also referred to as Doi Shōkai (土居商会). This was a Japanese retailer, distributor, or both, that started in 1949. (Doi here is a surname, shōten means "retailer", and shōkai means "trading company".) In the early fifties it was based in Osaka.

Kimio Doi (土居君雄, Doi Kimio), son of the Mr. Doi of Doi Shōten, started a branch in Fukuoka at some time around 1956. In 1959 this became plain Doi (株式会社ドイ, Kabushiki Kaisha Doi).

Doi provided diverse services, such as professional darkroom work. Retail stores were branded "Camera no Doi" (カメラのドイ, Kamera no Doi); these were known for the array of used cameras as well as competitive prices of new equipment.

By the 1980s, Doi was as large a presence as Yodobashi Camera in the Nishi-Shinjuku area of west-central Tokyo. Its sales peaked in March 1989. However, it faltered in the 1990s and closed down in 2003. Doi Technical Photo seems to have survived this, even running a photography gallery in Yūrakuchō, but as of 2006, it appears to be defunct.

== Sources ==
- (in Japanese) Asahi Camera (アサヒカメラ) editorial staff. Shōwa 10–40nen kōkoku ni miru kokusan kamera no rekishi (昭和10〜40年広告にみる国産カメラの歴史, Japanese camera history as seen in advertisements, 1935–1965). Tokyo: Asahi Shinbunsha, 1994. ISBN 4-02-330312-7. Item 418.
- (in Japanese) Hagiya Takeshi (萩谷剛). "Makina 67: Ribaibaru shita jabara-kamera" (マキナ67：リバイバルした蛇腹カメラ, Makina 67: A bellows camera revival). Chapter 10 of Zunō kamera tanjō: Sengo kokusan kamera jū monogatari (ズノーカメラ誕生：戦後国産カメラ10物語, The birth of the Zunow camera: Ten stories of postwar Japanese camera makers). Tokyo: Asahi Sonorama, 1999. ISBN 4-257-12023-1

This article was originally based on "Doi" in Camerapedia, retrieved at an unknown date under the GNU Free Documentation License.
