= Press camera =

Medium or large format camera

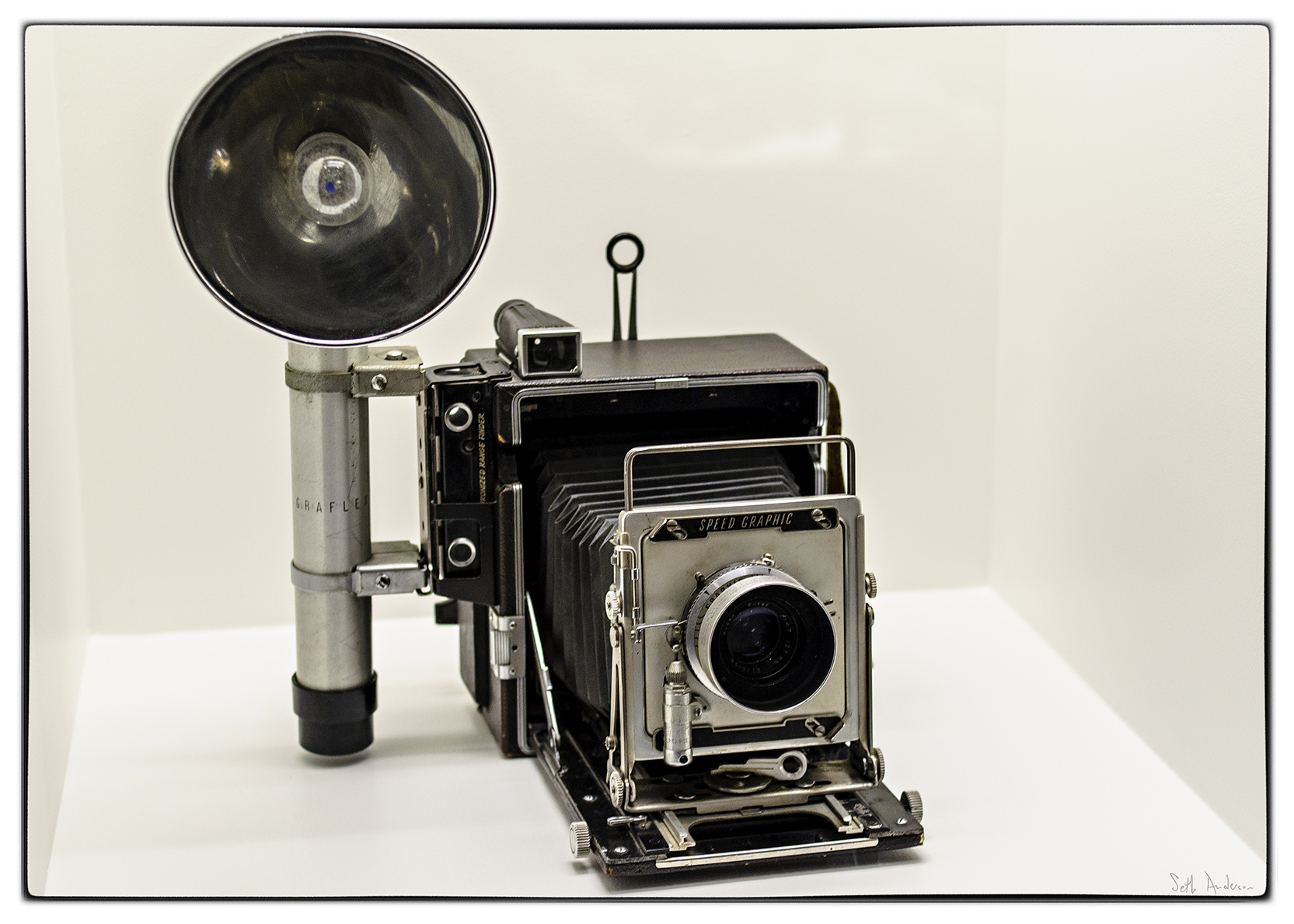
4x5" Graflex Speed Graphic press camera with optional rangefinder on left, with attached bulb flash.

A press camera is a medium or large format view camera that was predominantly used by press photographers in the early to mid-20th century. It was largely replaced for press photography by 35mm film cameras in the 1960s, and subsequently, by digital cameras. The quintessential press camera was the Speed Graphic. Press cameras are still used as portable and rugged view cameras.

== Details ==
Press cameras were widely used from the 1900s through the early 1960s and commonly have the following features:

- collapsible into strong, compact boxes
- flexible bellows, attached to a flatbed track
- easily interchangeable lenses, mounted on a solid support
- ability to accept sheet film, film packs, and roll film, through the use of interchangeable film backs and holders
- ground glass focusing screen
- optical viewfinder
- handheld operation (Note: Field cameras generally were heavier than press cameras and intended to be used on tripods rather than handheld)
- reduced number, reduced range or absence of movements, in contrast to field cameras or other view camera formats
- optical rangefinder focusing in some models
- Flash-synchronized internal iris lens shutter

Some models have both a focal plane shutter and an iris lens shutter. The focal plane shutter allows for fast shutter speeds and the use of lenses which do not have an integral shutter (known as a barrel lens), while the iris shutter allows for flash synchronization at any speed. The Graflex Speed Graphic models and the Ihagee Zweiverschluss ("two shutters") Duplex are examples of press cameras that had both focal plane and iris shutters.

The most common sheet film size for press cameras was the 4×5 inch film format. Models have also been produced for the 2.25×3.25 inch format (6×9 cm), 3.25×4.25 inch format and various 120 film formats from 6×6 cm. through 6×12 cm. European press cameras, such as the Goerz and Van Neck, used the 9×12cm format, marginally smaller than the 4"×5" format.

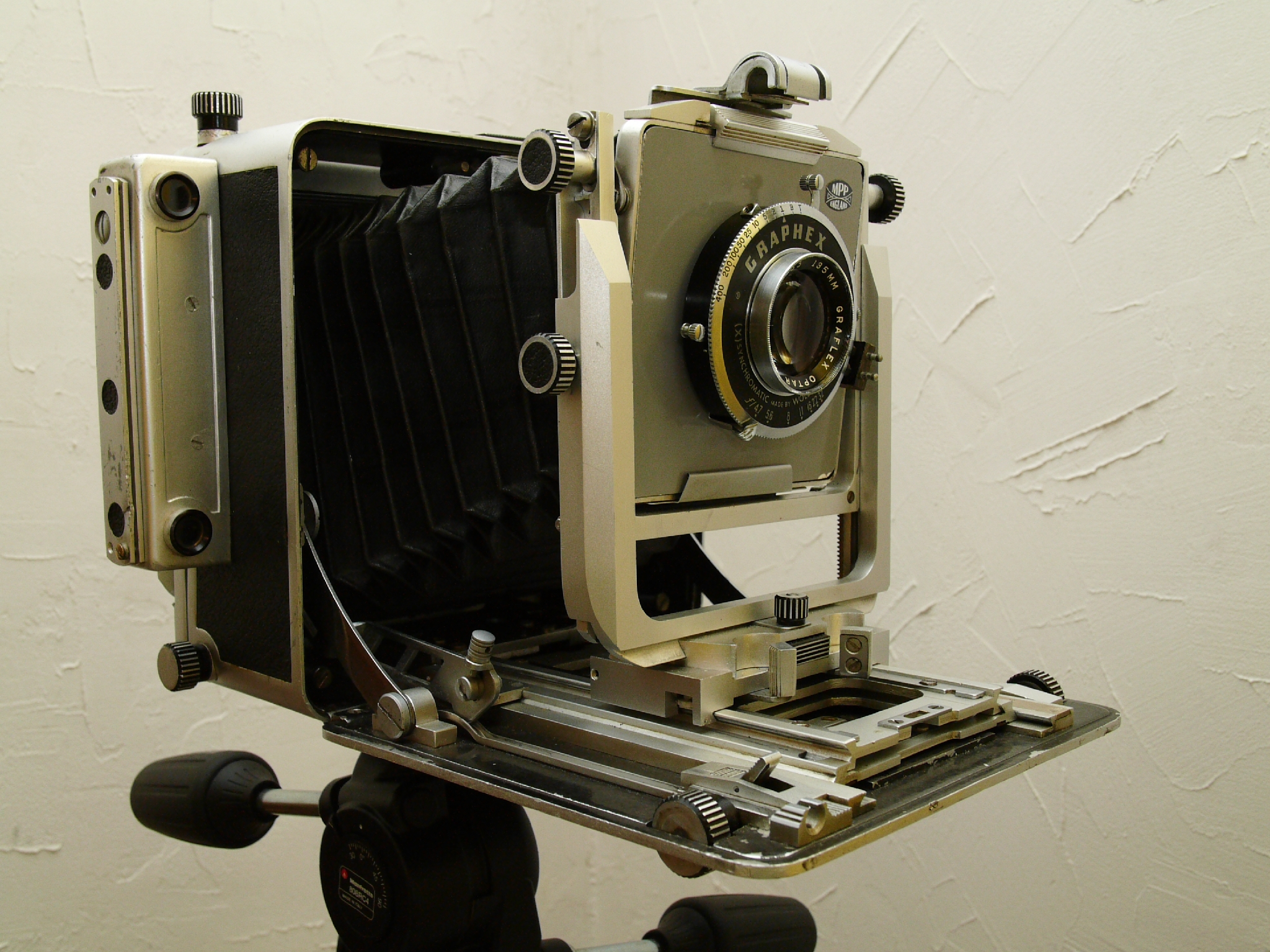
Many press cameras can be fitted with rangefinders for handheld use

The press camera is still used as a portable medium or large format film camera for photojournalism and among fine art photographers who use it as a low cost, more portable alternative to a view camera. In news photography, the press camera has been largely supplanted by the smaller formats of 120 film and 135 film, and more recently by digital cameras. The advantage of the 4×5 inch format over 35 mm format is that the size of the film negative is 16 times that of a 35 mm film negative image. (Note: Some professional DSLR cameras have an image sensor which is the same size as 35mm format (36×24 mm) while most consumer and prosumer digital cameras have significantly smaller CCDs.)

Press cameras were largely superseded by the 6x6cm medium format Rolleiflex in the early to mid-1960s and later by 35 mm rangefinder or single-lens reflex cameras. The smaller formats gained acceptance as film technology advanced and quality of the smaller negatives was deemed acceptable by picture editors. The smaller cameras generally offered lenses with faster maximum apertures and by the nature of their smaller size, were easier to transport and use. The bulk and weight of the camera itself, as well as the size of the film holders (two pictures per film holder), limited the number of exposures photographers could make on an assignment; this was less of an issue with 12 exposures on a roll of 120 film, or 36 exposures on 35 mm film.

Compared to view cameras, press cameras do not have the range of swing/tilt movements of the front standard, and rarely have back movements because many were fitted with focal plane shutters.

== List of press cameras ==
- Beseler
  - Beseler 4×5
- Burke & James Press, Burke & James Inc., Chicago, U.S.A.
  - B & J Press (4×5)
  - Watson (2×3)
- Busch Pressman
  - Model C (2×3)
  - Model D (4×5)
  - Tower Press (2×3, 4×5) = Sears Tower branded Busch Pressman
- Goerz Anschutz
  - Ango series
- Graflex, the classic American press camera
  - Speed Graphic (3¼×4¼, 4×5") (Note: The Speed Graphic was also available in 5x7 inch format, but usually limited to studio rather than press use due to weight)
  - Miniature Speed Graphic (2¼x3¼")
  - Crown Graphic (3¼×4¼, 4×5")
  - Miniature Crown Graphic (2¼x3¼")
  - Century Graphic (2¼x3¼")
  - Super Crown Graphic (4×5")
  - Super Speed Graphic (4×5")
  - Pacemaker Speed Graphic (2¼x3¼, 3¼×4¼, 4×5")
  - Pacemaker Crown Graphic (2¼x3¼, 3¼×4¼, 4×5")
- Ihagee
  - Zweiverschluss Duplex (6.5x9 cm, 9x12 cm and 10x15 cm)
- Kalart Press (3×4)
- Linhof
  - Super Technika
  - Linhof Technika Press, model of both Graflex XL and Mamiya Press
  - Linhof Press 70
  - Linhof Press (4×5) = Technika III with limited movements
- Mamiya
  - Mamiya Press
  - Mamiya Universal
- Meridan 45 (A, B, maybe C)
- Micro Precision Products
  - MPP MicroPress—English design focal plane shutter camera from 1950s, based on Speed Graphic model with the rangefinder mounted horizontally at the top
- Omega
  - Koni Omega
  - Rapid Omega
- Plaubel Makina
- Polaroid
  - Polaroid 600/600 SE
- Press King, B&W Manufacturing Co., Ontario, Canada
- Ramlose Model A (4×5)
- Thornton-Pickard,
- Topcon / Komamura
  - Topcon Horseman (2¼ x 3¼) Models 760, 960, 970, 980, 985, VH and VHR
- Toyo Super Graphic (4×5)
- Van Neck, (Note: Agents for Goerz Anschütz cameras pre-WW1, manufactured the British Anschütz camera from 1919 until 1924 when supplies of Goerz were unavailable.)
- Wista 45RF

== See also ==
- View camera
- Field camera
- Speed Graphic
- Weegee
