= Linhof =

German camera manufacturer

Linhof (Linhof Präzisions-Systemtechnik GmbH)

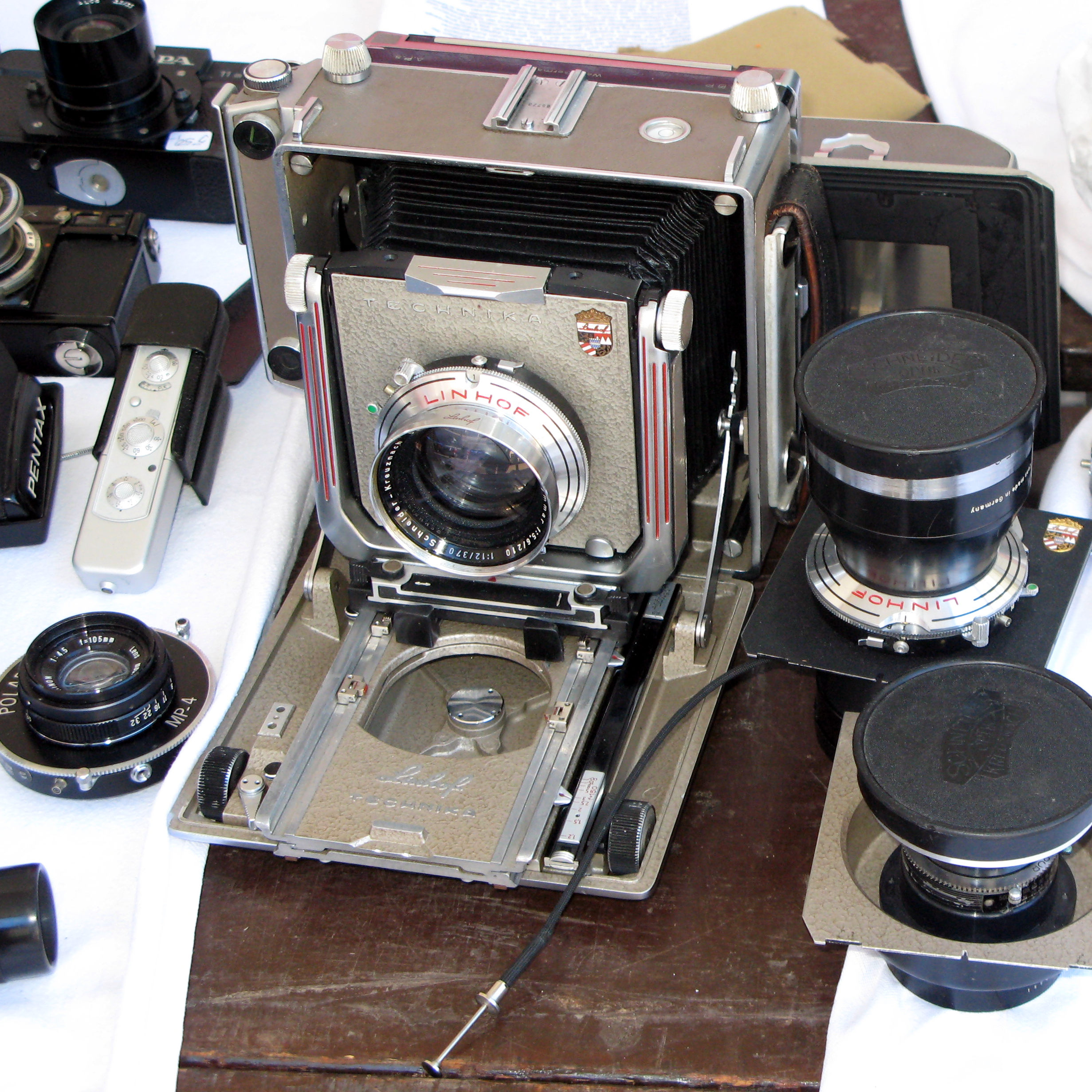
- Type: Gesellschaft mit beschränkter Haftung
- Industry: Photography, Digital Imaging, Still cameras, lenses
- Founded: 1887
- Headquarters: Munich, Germany
- Key people: Valentin Linhof
- Website: http://linhof.com/

Linhof is a German company, founded in Munich in 1887 by Valentin Linhof. The company makes premium rollfilm and large format film cameras. Linhof initially focused on making camera shutters and developed the first leaf shutter, which became part of Compur.

Nikolaus Karpf entered the company in 1934 and that year designed the Technika, the world's first all-metal folding field camera. Revised models of the Technika are still in production.

Linhof is the oldest still-producing camera manufacturer in the world after Gandolfi closed and Kodak sold their production to Calumet.

== Products ==
=== Folding bed field cameras ===
==== 6x9 cm ====
See also Linhof 6x9.

- Linhof Ur-Technika (1934)
- Linhof Technika
- Linhof Technika III, with or without RF
- Linhof Technika IV
- Linhof Super Technika IV
- Linhof Technika 70
- Linhof Studienkamera 70
- Linhof Super Technika V = Super Technika 23
- Linhof Technikardan 23S
- Linhof Techno

==== 9x12 cm ====
- Linhof Technika II (1937–1943)

==== 4x5 in. ====
- Linhof 34 (1934–1936)
- Linhof Technika Medizin (1937–1943)
- Linhof Standard Press
- Linhof Technika III, with or without RF
- Linhof Technika IV
- Linhof Super Technika IV
- Linhof Technika V
- Linhof Super Technika V
- Linhof Master Technika = Master Technika Classic
- Linhof Master Technika 2000
- Linhof Master Technika 3000
- Linhof Technikardan 45
- Linhof TechniKardan 45S
- Linhof TechniKardan 23
- Linhof TechniKardan 23S

==== 13x18 ====
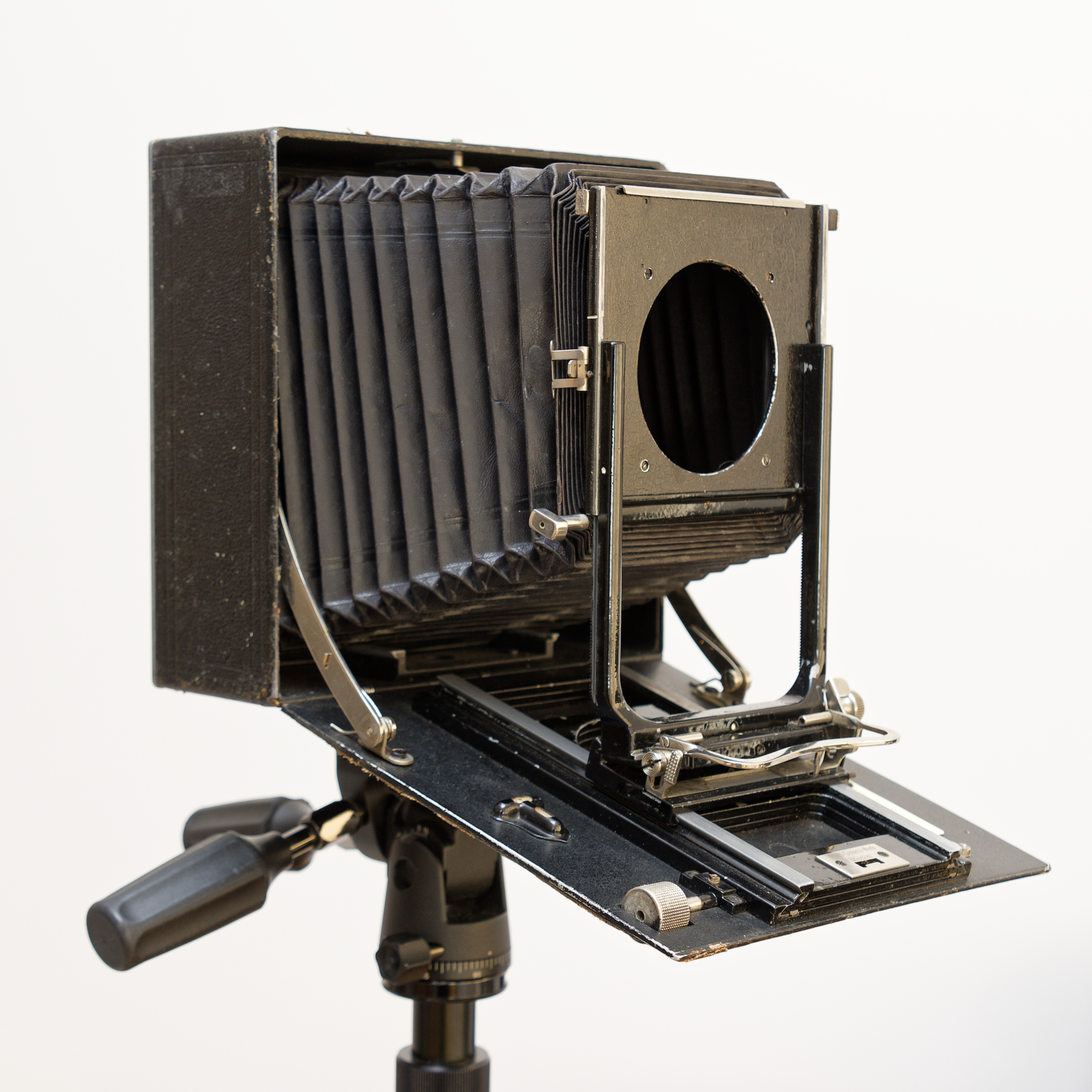
Linhof Standard 13x18 camera (between 1936-1939)

- Linhof Standard
- Linhof Technika
- Linhof Technika III, with or without RF
- Linhof Super Technika V

==== 18x24 ====
- Linhof Präzisionskamera 18x24 (Technika) (1937–1943) only 10 items made
- Linhof Präzisionskamera 18x24 (Technika "Medizin" in grey) only 1 item made (pre-owner: famous German photographer Adolf Lazi and Franz Lazi)

=== Monorail view cameras ===
- Linhof Color 4x5 (inches)
- Linhof Kardan 4x5
- Linhof Kardan Colour 4x5
- Linhof Technikardan s45 4x5
- Linhof Bi
- Linhof Super Color
- Linhof Super Color JBL
- Linhof TL
- Linhof GT
- Linhof GTL
- Linhof Kardan E
- Linhof Kardan M
- Linhof Kardan TE
- Linhof Technikardan s23 2x3 (inches)
- Linhof TechniKardan 45
- Linhof TechniKardan 45S
- Linhof M679 6x9
- Linhof M679cc 6x9
- Linhof M679cs 6x9

=== Rigid body cameras ===
- Linhof Technika Press

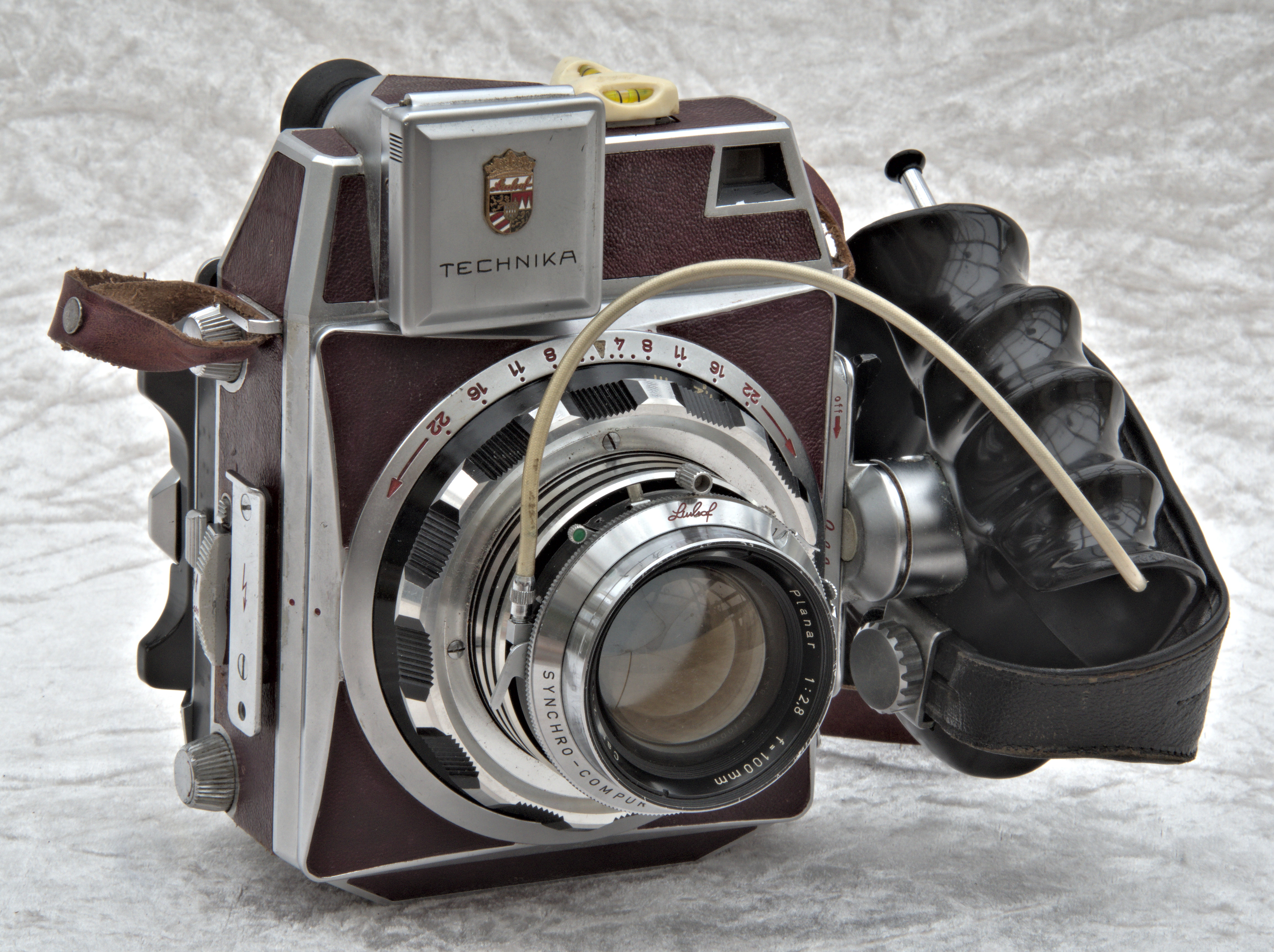
Linhof Technika Press 6x9cm Camera

- Linhof Weitwinkelkamera 65
- Linhof Press 70
- Linhof 220
- Linhof 220 PL
- Linhof 220 RS
- Linhof Technar 45 (4x5)

=== Panoramic ===
==== 6x12 ====
- Technorama 612PC
- Technorama 612PC II
- Technorama 612PC III

==== 6x17 ====
- Technorama
- Technorama 617S
- Technorama 617S III

=== Aerial photography ===
- Aero Press
- Electric 70
- Aerotronica 69 (6x9
- Aero Technika (4x5")
- Aero Technika 45 (4x5")
- Aero Technika 45EL (4x5")
- Aero Technika 18x24

=== Photogrammetry, 4x5 in. ===
- Metrika 45
- Metrika 45R

=== Digital Platform ===
- Linhof Techno
- Linhof M 679cs

=== Accessories ===
- tripods
- ballheads
- Linhof Levelling Pan/Tilt Heads
- Linhof quicklock tripod connector Quickfix

== See also ==
- Graflex – similar cameras manufactured in the United States
- Press camera

== Bibliography ==
- The Linhof camera story, edited by the company
