= Veramark Technologies =

American software company

Veramark Technologies, Inc.

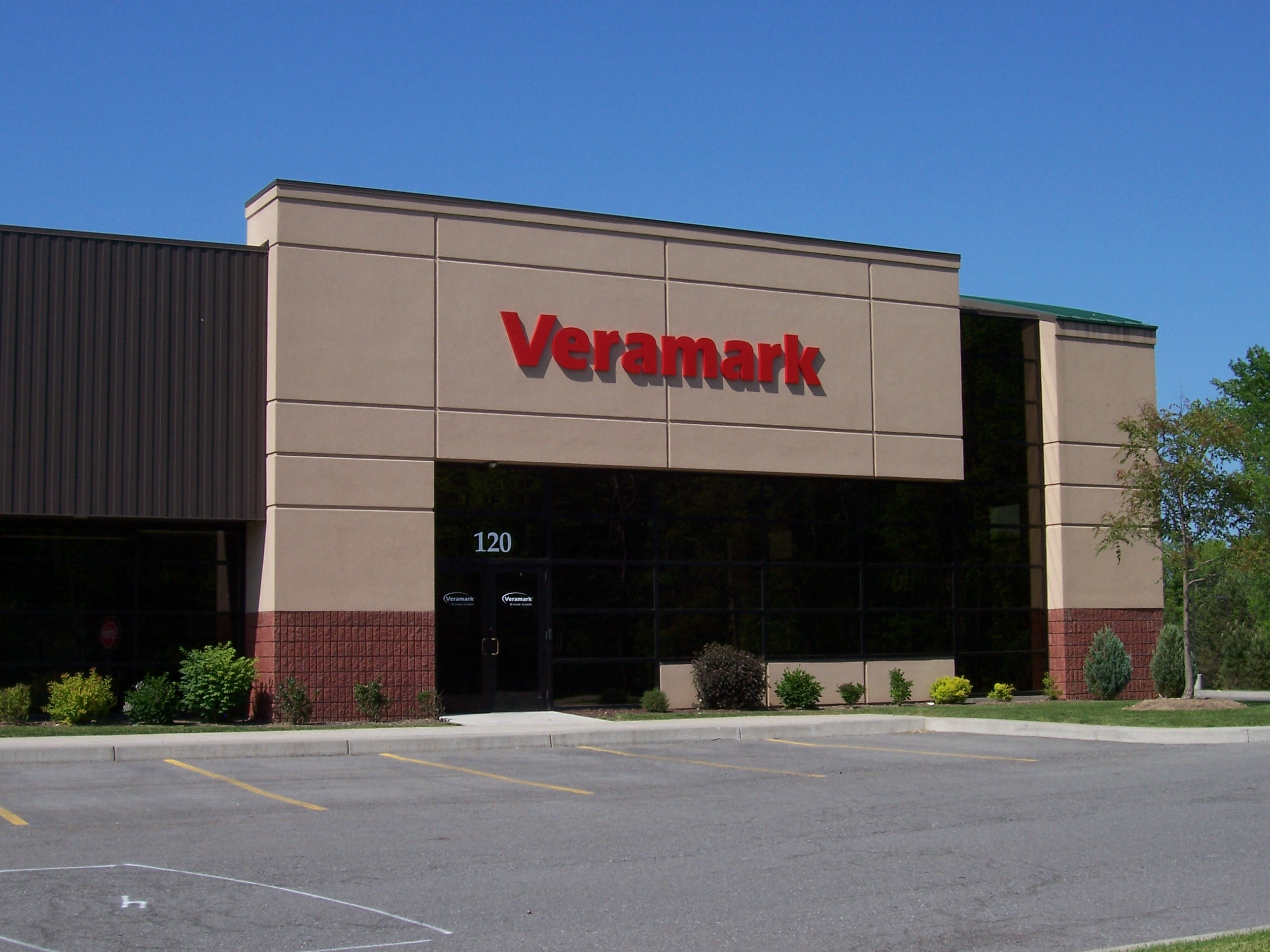
- Headquarters in Henrietta, New York
- Type: Public
- Traded as: OTCQB: VERA
- Industry: Software and managed services for Telecom Expense Management
- Predecessor: MOSCOM Corporation
- Founded: January 1983
- Founder: Albert J. Montevecchio
- Successor: Calero
- Headquarters: Henrietta, New York, U.S.
- Area served: United States, Canada
- Key people: Tony Mazzullo, President and CEO
- Products: VeraSMART Telecom Expense Management Suite; VeraSMART Call Accounting Software
- Services: Managed and professional Telecom Expense Management services
- Revenue: ▲US$13.165 million (2010)
- Operating income: ▲US$0.561 million (2010)
- Net income: ▲US$0.611 million (2010)
- Total assets: ▲US$12.873 million (2010)
- Total equity: ▲US$0.442 million (2010)
- Owner: Clearlake Capital Group
- Number of employees: ▲95 (2010)
- Subsidiaries: Calero Software
- Website: www.veramark.com

Veramark Technologies, Inc. provided services and software for Telecom Expense Management and call accounting. The company "specialized in controlling telecom expenses by managing a company's voice, data, and wireless services through a combination of auditing, consulting and software".

Veramark, originally known as MOSCOM Corporation, was founded in 1983.

In 2001, the company sold all the rights for the VeraBill product line, a mediation, provisioning and billing solution for wireline and wireless mid-size carriers, to Mind CTI Ltd. for US$ $1 million.

The company acquired the enterprise TEM and consulting businesses of Source Loop LLC, a Georgia-based telecom service provider, in June 2010. In September 2010, the company moved into 23,000 feet of new office space at Eagle's Landing Business Park in Henrietta, New York.

In a September 2010 State of the Industry Report published by AOTMP, Veramark was ranked among the top 25 suppliers of TEM and Wireless Mobility Management solutions. In December 2013, Veramark Technologies merged with PINNACLE and Movero to form Calero.

Chief executives
| Name | Tenure |
|---|---|
| Albert J. Montevecchio | January 1983 – July 1997 |
| David G. Mazzella, Jr. | July 1997 – December 2007 |
| Anthony C. Mazzullo | January 2008 – 2013 |

== Products and services ==
- Veramark TEM services included licensed software deployments, hosted Software-as-a-Service (SaaS) agreements, and fully managed services.
- The VeraSMART Telecom Expense Management software suite included capabilities for managing contracts and sourcing, ordering and provisioning, invoices and disputes, inventory, usage, and process automation.
- VeraSMART eCAS Call Accounting Software has been rated compliant with Release 6 of the Avaya Communication Server IP PBX.
