= Komamura Corporation =

Coordinates: 35.6854°N 139.77976°E

- Native name: 駒村商会
- Romanized name: Komamura Shokai
- Company type: LLC
- Founded: 1933; 92 years ago in Kyoto, Japan
- Headquarters: Tokyo, Japan
- Key people: Toshiyuki Komamura, President
- Website: komamura.co.jp

Komamura Corporation is a Japanese company that most notably manufactured medium- and large-format cameras. The company's first camera, the PC-101, was offered in 1948 as a police inspection camera; this was soon developed into a press camera, the Horseman 102, which was the first Horseman Professional branded camera.

== History ==
In 1933, Komamura Brothers was founded in Kyoto; the first camera produced was the PC-101, an inspection camera for the National Police Agency produced in 1948. This was developed into the Horseman 102, which was also designed for police inspection and offered in 1950.

Komamura relocated in Tokyo in 1982. In 1992, Komamura signed the first of several licensing agreements to be the exclusive distributor for foreign photographic and video products in Japan, including Rodenstock and Schneider Kreuznach lenses, Gossen light meters, and Anton Bauer batteries.

Komamura transferred the Horseman Professional photographic business assets to Kenko Professional Imaging in 2012; Kenko continues to market the cameras and photographic accessories developed by Komamura under the Horseman brand. Komamura's primary business is currently centered on sales of night vision scopes and cameras.

== Products ==
=== Current ===
Komamura developed and launched the Falcon Eye KC-2000 high-sensitivity camera in 2014, providing full-color imaging.

=== Past ===
Past cameras developed by Komamura and marketed under the Horseman Professional brand include:

35mm

- DigiFlex / DigiFlex II
- Horseman 3D

Medium format

- Press/Field
  - Horseman 970
  - Horseman 975
  - Horseman 980
  - Horseman 985
  - Horseman VH (VH-R)
- Limited movements (vertical/lateral shift only)
  - Horseman SW-D Pro
  - Horseman SW612 Professional
  - Horseman SW617 Professional
  - Horseman SW6x9
- Rigid camera (no movements)
  - Horseman SW612

Large format

- Press/Field
  - Horseman 45FA
  - Horseman 45HD
  - Woodman 45
- View
  - Horseman L-series (L, LS, LE, LX)
  - Horseman X-Act-D

Accessories marketed by Horseman include:

35mm

- VCC (View Camera Converter)
- LD / LD Pro (L-series View Camera for Digital SLRs)

Medium format

- VCC (View Camera Converter)

Large format

- ISS (Intelligent Shutter System)
