= Photographic film =

Visual storage media used by film cameras

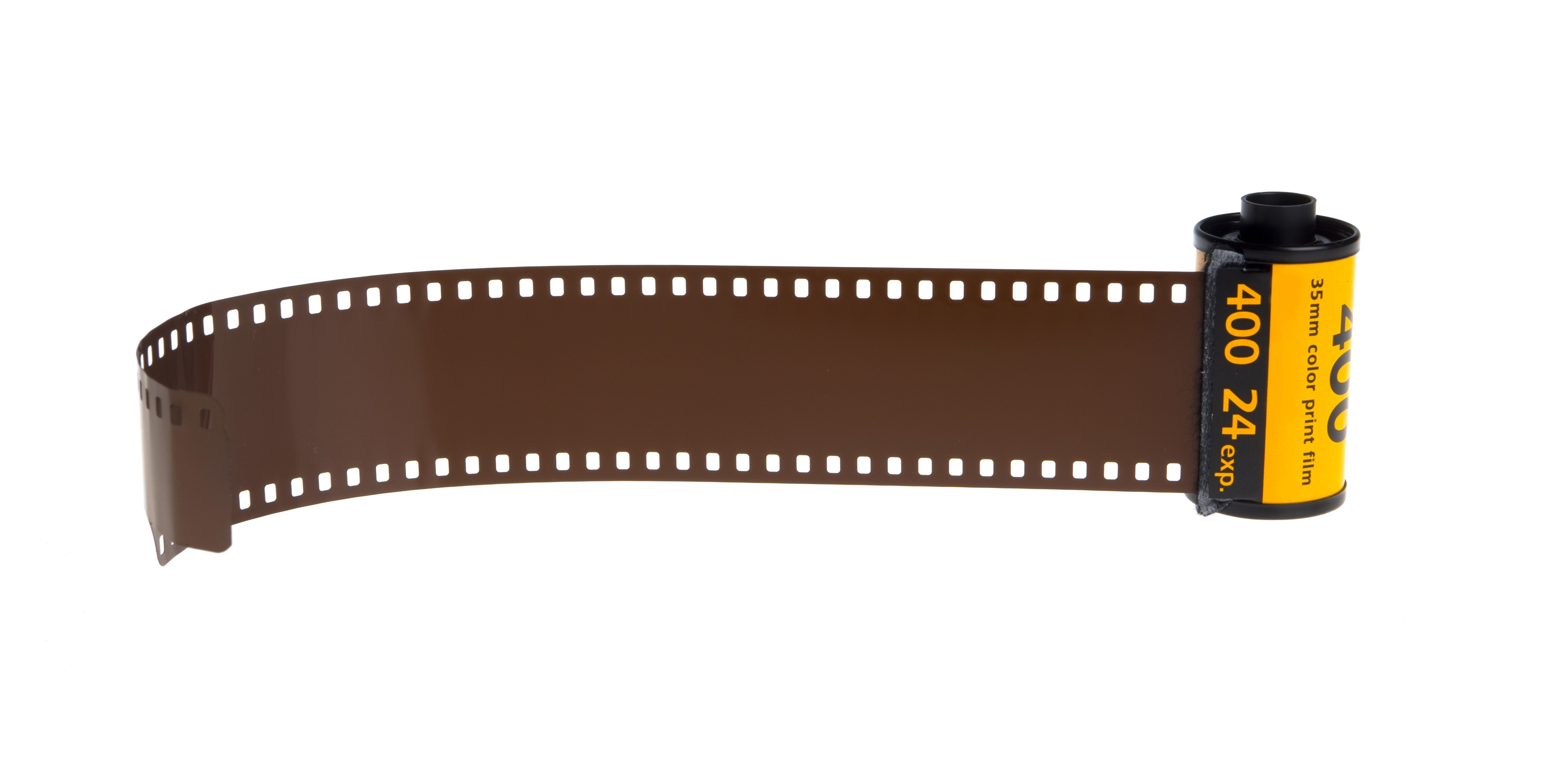
Undeveloped 24-exposure roll of Kodak Ultramax 400, a consumer-grade color negative film stock

Photographic film is a strip or sheet of transparent film base coated on one side with a gelatin emulsion containing microscopically small light-sensitive silver halide crystals, for the purpose of taking photographs. The sizes and other characteristics of the crystals determine the sensitivity, contrast, and resolution of the film. Film is typically segmented in frames, which give rise to separate photographs.

The emulsion will gradually darken if left exposed to light, but the process is too slow and incomplete to be of practical use. Instead, a very short exposure to the image made possible by a camera lens is used to produce only a very slight chemical change, proportional to the amount of light absorbed by each crystal. This creates an invisible latent image in the emulsion, which can be chemically developed into a visible photograph. In addition to visible light, most films are sensitive to ultraviolet light, X-rays, gamma rays, and high-energy particles. Unmodified silver halide crystals are sensitive only to the blue part of the visible spectrum, producing unnatural-looking renditions of some colored subjects. This problem was resolved with the discovery that certain dyes, called sensitizing dyes, when adsorbed onto the silver halide crystals, made them respond to other colors as well. First orthochromatic (sensitive to blue and green) and finally panchromatic (sensitive to all visible colors) films were developed. Panchromatic film renders all colors in shades of gray approximately matching their subjective brightness. By similar techniques, special-purpose films can be made sensitive to the infrared (IR) region of the spectrum.

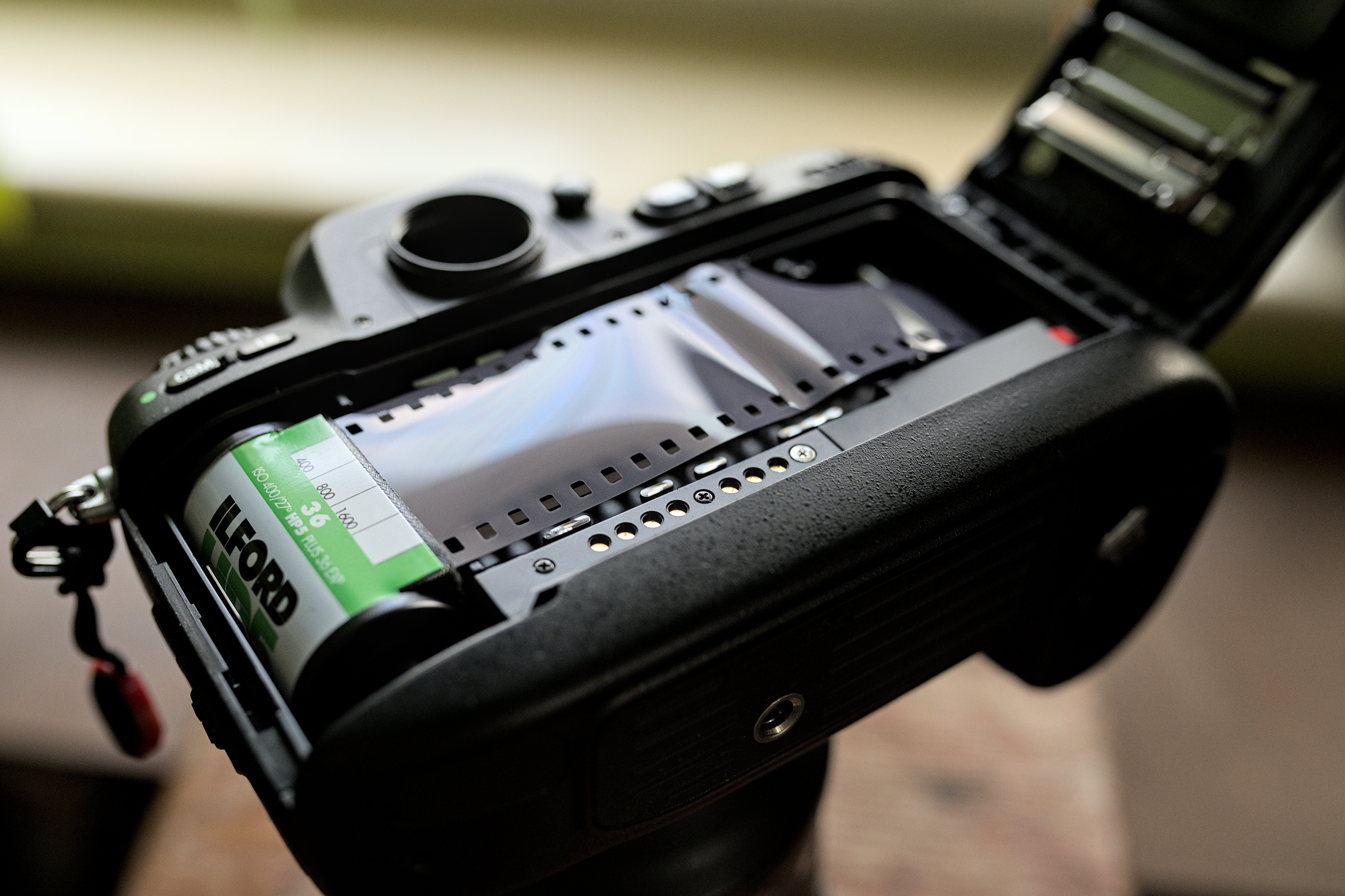
Nikon F100 analog camera during loading of 35mm film

In black-and-white photographic film, there is usually one layer of silver halide crystals. When the exposed silver halide grains are developed, the crystals are converted to metallic silver, which blocks light and appears as the black part of the film negative. Color film has at least three sensitive layers, incorporating different combinations of sensitizing dyes. Typically, the blue-sensitive layer is on top, followed by a yellow filter layer to stop any remaining blue light from affecting the layers below. Next comes a green-and-blue sensitive layer, and a red-and-blue sensitive layer, which record the green and red images respectively. During development, the exposed silver halide crystals are converted to metallic silver, just as with black-and-white film. But in a color film, the by-products of the development reaction simultaneously combine with chemicals known as color couplers that are included either in the film itself or in the developer solution to form colored dyes. Because the by-products are created in direct proportion to the amount of exposure and development, the dye clouds formed are also in proportion to the exposure and development. Following development, the silver is converted back to silver halide crystals in the bleach step. It is removed from the film during the process of fixing the image on the film with a solution of ammonium thiosulfate or sodium thiosulfate (hypo or fixer). Fixing leaves behind only the formed color dyes, which combine to make up the colored visible image. Later color films, like Kodacolor II, have as many as 12 emulsion layers, with upwards of 20 different chemicals in each layer.

Photographic film and film stock tend to be similar in composition and speed, but often not in other parameters such as frame size and length. Silver halide photographic paper is also similar to photographic film.

Before the emergence of digital photography, photographs on film had to be developed to produce negatives or projectable slides, and negatives had to be printed as positive images, usually in enlarged form. This was usually done by photographic laboratories, but many amateurs did their own processing.

== Characteristics of film ==
=== Film basics ===
Layers of 35 mm color film: 1. Film base; 2. Subbing layer; 3. Red light sensitive layer; 4. Green light sensitive layer; 5. Yellow filter; 6. Blue light sensitive layer; 7. UV Filter; 8. Protective layer; 9. Visible light exposing film

There are several types of photographic film, including:

- Print film, when developed, yields transparent negatives with the light and dark areas and colors (if color film is used) inverted to their respective complementary colors. This type of film is designed to be printed onto photographic paper, usually by means of an enlarger but in some cases by contact printing. The paper is then itself developed. The second inversion that results restores light, shade and color to their normal appearance. Color negatives incorporate an orange color correction mask that compensates for unwanted dye absorptions and improves color accuracy in the prints. Although color processing is more complex and temperature-sensitive than black-and-white processing, the wide availability of commercial color processing and scarcity of service for black-and-white prompted the design of some black-and-white films which are processed in exactly the same way as standard color film.
- Color reversal film produces positive transparencies, also known as diapositives. Transparencies can be reviewed with the aid of a magnifying loupe and a lightbox. If mounted in small metal, plastic or cardboard frames for use in a slide projector or slide viewer they are commonly called slides. Reversal film is often marketed as "slide film". Large-format color reversal sheet film is used by some professional photographers, typically to originate very-high-resolution imagery for digital scanning into color separations for mass photomechanical reproduction. Photographic prints can be produced from reversal film transparencies, but positive-to-positive print materials for doing this directly (e.g. Ektachrome paper, Cibachrome/Ilfochrome) have all been discontinued, so it now requires the use of an internegative to convert the positive transparency image into a negative transparency, which is then printed as a positive print.
- Black-and-white reversal film exists but is very uncommon. Conventional black-and-white negative film can be reversal-processed to produce black-and-white slides, as by dr5 Chrome. Although kits of chemicals for black-and-white reversal processing may no longer be available to amateur darkroom enthusiasts, an acid bleaching solution, the only unusual component which is essential, is easily prepared from scratch. Black-and-white transparencies may also be produced by printing negatives onto special positive print film, still available from some specialty photographic supply dealers.

In order to produce a usable image, the film needs to be exposed properly. The amount of exposure variation that a given film can tolerate, while still producing an acceptable level of quality, is called its exposure latitude. Color print film generally has greater exposure latitude than other types of film. Additionally, because print film must be printed to be viewed, after-the-fact corrections for imperfect exposure are possible during the printing process.

Plot of image density (D) vs. log exposure (H), yields a characteristic S-curve (H&D curve) for each type of film to determine its sensitivity. Changing the emulsion properties or the processing parameters will move the curve to the left or right. Changing the exposure will move along the curve, helping to determine what exposure is needed for a given film. Note the non-linear response at the far left ("toe") and right ("shoulder") of the curve.

The concentration of dyes or silver halide crystals remaining on the film after development is referred to as optical density, or simply density; the optical density is proportional to the logarithm of the optical transmission coefficient of the developed film. A dark image on the negative is of higher density than a more transparent image.

Most films are affected by the physics of silver grain activation (which sets a minimum amount of light required to expose a single grain) and by the statistics of random grain activation by photons. The film requires a minimum amount of light before it begins to expose, and then responds by progressive darkening over a wide dynamic range of exposure until all of the grains are exposed, and the film achieves (after development) its maximum optical density.

Over the active dynamic range of most films, the density of the developed film is proportional to the logarithm of the total amount of light to which the film was exposed, so the transmission coefficient of the developed film is proportional to a power of the reciprocal of the brightness of the original exposure. The plot of the density of the film image against the log of the exposure is known as an H&D curve. This effect is due to the statistics of grain activation: as the film becomes progressively more exposed, each incident photon is less likely to impact a still-unexposed grain, yielding the logarithmic behavior. A simple, idealized statistical model yields the equation density = 1 – ( 1 – k) ^{light}, where light is proportional to the number of photons hitting a unit area of film, k is the probability of a single photon striking a grain (based on the size of the grains and how closely spaced they are), and density is the proportion of grains that have been hit by at least one photon. The relationship between density and log exposure is linear for photographic films except at the extreme ranges of maximum exposure (D-max) and minimum exposure (D-min) on an H&D curve, so the curve is characteristically S-shaped (as opposed to digital camera sensors which have a linear response through the effective exposure range). The sensitivity (i.e., the ISO speed) of a film can be affected by changing the length or temperature of development, which would move the H&D curve to the left or right (see figure).

If parts of the image are exposed heavily enough to approach the maximum density possible for a print film, then they will begin losing the ability to show tonal variations in the final print. Usually those areas will be considered overexposed and will appear as featureless white on the print. Some subject matter is tolerant of very heavy exposure. For example, sources of brilliant light, such as a light bulb or the sun, generally appear best as a featureless white on the print.

Likewise, if part of an image receives less than the beginning threshold level of exposure, which depends upon the film's sensitivity to light – or speed – the film there will have no appreciable image density, and will appear on the print as a featureless black. Some photographers use their knowledge of these limits to determine the optimum exposure for a photograph; for one example, see the Zone System. Most automatic cameras instead try to achieve a particular average density.

Color films can have many layers. The film base can have an antihalation layer applied to it or be dyed. This layer prevents light from reflecting from within the film, increasing image quality. This also can make films exposable on only one side, as it prevents exposure from behind the film. This layer is bleached after development to make it clear, thus making the film transparent. The antihalation layer, besides having a black colloidal silver sol pigment for absorbing light, can also have two UV absorbents to improve lightfastness of the developed image, an oxidized developer scavenger, dyes for compensating for optical density during printing, solvents, gelatin and disodium salt of 3,5- disulfocatechol. If applied to the back of the film, it also serves to prevent scratching, as an antistatic measure due to its conductive carbon content, and as a lubricant to help transport the film through mechanisms. The antistatic property is necessary to prevent the film from getting fogged under low humidity, and mechanisms to avoid static are present in most if not all films. If applied on the back it is removed during film processing. If applied it may be on the back of the film base in triacetate film bases or in the front in PET film bases, below the emulsion stack. An anticurl layer and a separate antistatic layer may be present in thin high resolution films that have the antihalation layer below the emulsion. PET film bases are often dyed, specially because PET can serve as a light pipe; black and white film bases tend to have a higher level of dying applied to them. The film base needs to be transparent but with some density, perfectly flat, insensitive to light, chemically stable, resistant to tearing and strong enough to be handled manually and by camera mechanisms and film processing equipment, while being chemically resistant to moisture and the chemicals used during processing without losing strength, flexibility or changing in size.

The subbing layer is essentially an adhesive that allows the subsequent layers to stick to the film base. The film base was initially made of highly flammable cellulose nitrate, which was replaced by cellulose acetate films, often cellulose triacetate film (safety film), which in turn was replaced in many films (such as all print films, most duplication films and some other specialty films) by a polyethylene terephthalate (also known as Mylar) plastic film base. Films with a triacetate base can suffer from vinegar syndrome, a decomposition process accelerated by warm and humid conditions, that releases acetic acid which is the characteristic component of vinegar, imparting the film a strong vinegar smell, accelerating damage within the film and possibly even damaging surrounding metal and films. Films are usually spliced using a special adhesive tape; those with PET layers can be ultrasonically spliced or their ends melted and then spliced.

The emulsion layers of films are made by dissolving pure silver in nitric acid to form silver nitrate crystals, which are mixed with other chemicals to form silver halide grains, which are then suspended in gelatin and applied to the film base. The size and hence the light sensitivity of these grains determines the speed of the film; since films contain real silver (as silver halide), faster films with larger crystals are more expensive and potentially subject to variations in the price of silver metal. Also, faster films have more grain, since the grains (crystals) are larger. Each crystal is often 0.2 to 2 microns in size; in color films, the dye clouds that form around the silver halide crystals are often 25 microns across. The crystals can be shaped as cubes, flat rectangles, tetradecadedra, or be flat and resemble a triangle with or without clipped edges; this type of crystal is known as a T-grain crystal or a tabular grain (T-grains). Films using T-grains are more sensitive to light without using more silver halide since they increase the surface area exposed to light by making the crystals flatter and larger in footprint instead of simply increasing their volume. T-grains can also have a hexagonal shape. These grains also have reduced sensitivity to blue light which is an advantage since silver halide is most sensitive to blue light than other colors of light. This was traditionally solved by the addition of a blue-blocking filter layer in the film emulsion, but T-grains have allowed this layer to be removed. Also the grains may have a "core" and "shell" where the core, made of silver iodobromide, has higher iodine content than the shell, which improves light sensitivity, these grains are known as Σ-Grains.

The exact silver halide used is either silver bromide or silver bromochloroiodide, or a combination of silver bromide, chloride and iodide. Silver iodobromide may be used as a silver halide.

Silver halide crystals can be made in several shapes for use in photographic films. For example, AgBrCl hexagonal tabular grains can be used for color negative films, AgBr octahedral grains can be used for instant color photography films, AgBrl cubo-octahedral grains can be used for color reversal films, AgBr hexagonal tabular grains can be used for medical X-ray films, and AgBrCl cubic grains can be used for graphic arts films.

In color films, each emulsion layer has silver halide crystals that are sensitized to one particular color (wavelength of light) via sentizing dyes, to that they will be made sensitive to only one color of light, and not to others, since silver halide particles are intrinsically sensitive only to wavelengths below 450 nm (which is blue light). The sensitizing dyes are absorbed at dislocations in the silver halide particles in the emulsion on the film. The sensitizing dyes may be supersensitized with a supersensitizing dye, that assists the function of the sensitizing dye and improves the efficiency of photon capture by silver halide. Each layer has a different type of color dye forming coupler: in the blue sensitive layer, the coupler forms a yellow dye; in the green sensitive layer the coupler forms a magenta dye, and in the red sensitive layer the coupler forms a cyan dye. Color films often have an UV blocking layer. Each emulsion layer in a color film may itself have three layers: a slow, medium and fast layer, to allow the film to capture higher contrast images. The color dye couplers are inside oil droplets dispersed in the emulsion around silver halide crystals, forming a silver halide grain. Here the oil droplets act as a surfactant, also protecting the couplers from chemical reactions with the silver halide and from the surrounding gelatin. During development, oxidized developer diffuses into the oil droplets and combines with the dye couplers to form dye clouds; the dye clouds only form around exposed silver halide crystals. The fixer then removes the silver halide crystals leaving only the dye clouds: this means that developed color films may not contain silver while undeveloped films do contain silver; this also means that the fixer can start to contain silver which can then be removed through electrolysis. Color films also contain light filters to filter out certain colors as the light passes through the film: often there is a blue light filter between the blue and green sensitive layers and a yellow filter before the red sensitive layer; in this way each layer is made sensitive to only a certain color of light.

The couplers need to be made resistant to diffusion (non-diffusible) so that they will not move between the layers of the film and thus cause incorrect color rendition as the couplers are specific to either cyan, magenta or yellow colors. This is done by making couplers with a ballast group such as a lipophilic group (oil-protected) and applying them in oil droplets to the film, or a hydrophilic group, or in a polymer layer such as a loadable latex layer with oil-protected couplers, in which case they are considered to be polymer-protected.

The color couplers may be colorless and be chromogenic or be colored. Colored couplers are used to improve the color reproduction of film. The first coupler which is used in the blue layer remains colorless to allow all light to pass through, but the coupler used in the green layer is colored yellow, and the coupler used in the red layer is light pink. Yellow was chosen to block any remaining blue light from exposing the underlying green and red layers (since yellow can be made from green and red). Each layer should only be sensitive to a single color of light and allow all others to pass through. Because of these colored couplers, the developed film appears orange. Colored couplers mean that corrections through color filters need to be applied to the image before printing. Printing can be carried out by using an optical enlarger, or by scanning the image, correcting it using software and printing it using a digital printer.

Kodachrome films have no couplers; the dyes are instead formed by a long sequence of steps, limiting adoption among smaller film processing companies.

Black and white films are very simple by comparison, only consisting of silver halide crystals suspended in a gelatin emulsion which sits on a film base with an antihalation back.

Many films contain a top supercoat layer to protect the emulsion layers from damage. Some manufacturers manufacture their films with daylight, tungsten (named after the tungsten filament of incandescent and halogen lamps) or fluorescent lighting in mind, recommending the use of lens filters, light meters and test shots in some situations to maintain color balance, or by recommending the division of the ISO value of the film by the distance of the subject from the camera to get an appropriate f-number value to be set in the lens.

Examples of Color films are Kodachrome, often processed using the K-14 process, Kodacolor, Ektachrome, which is often processed using the E-6 process and Fujifilm Superia, which is processed using the C-41 process. The chemicals and the color dye couplers on the film may vary depending on the process used to develop the film.

=== Film speed ===
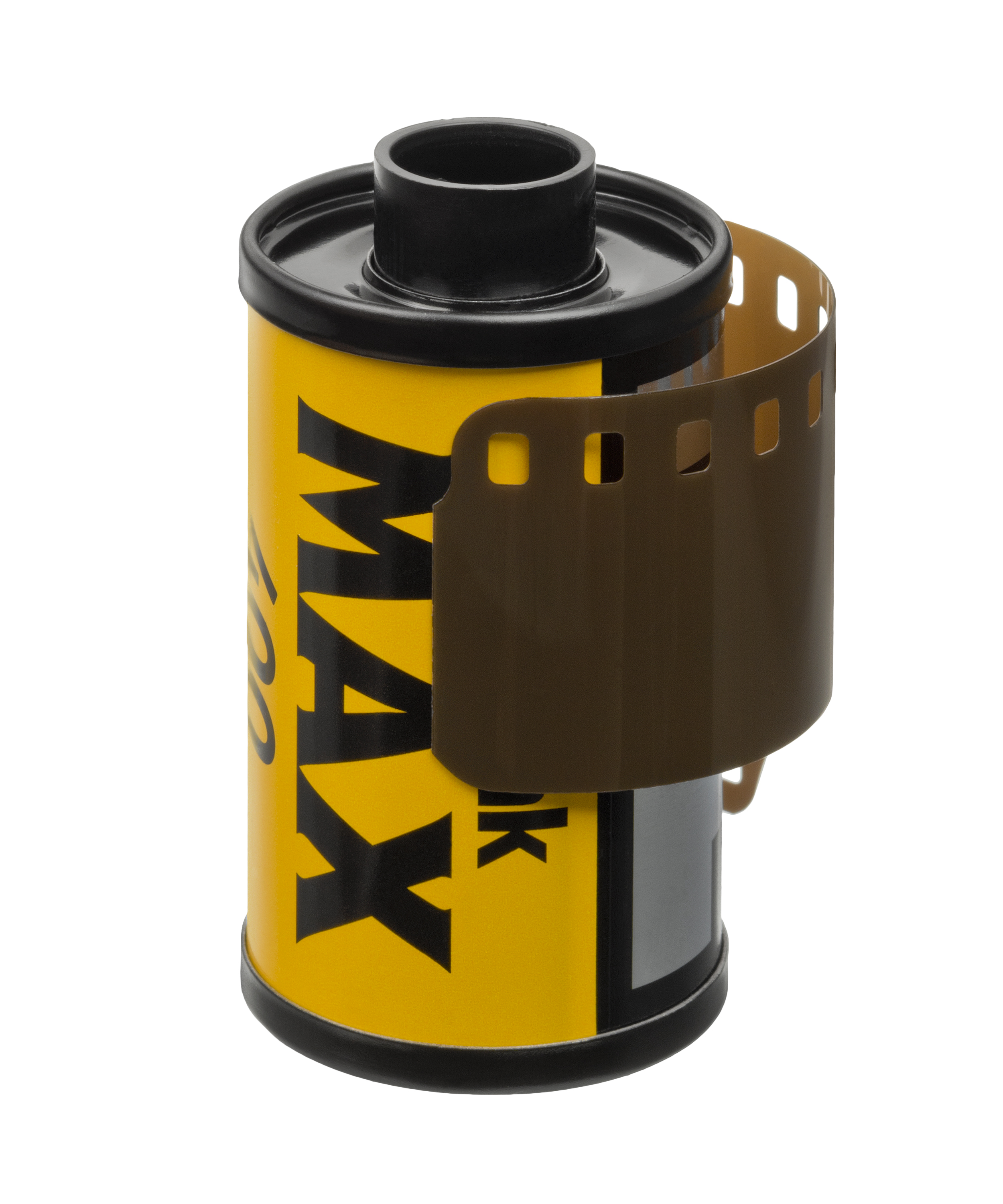
A roll of 400 speed Kodak 35 mm film

Film speed describes a film's threshold sensitivity to light. The international standard for rating film speed is the ISO scale, which combines both the ASA speed and the DIN speed in the format ASA/DIN. Using ISO convention film with an ASA speed of 400 would be labeled 400/27°. A fourth naming standard is GOST, developed by the Russian standards authority. See the film speed article for a table of conversions between ASA, DIN, and GOST film speeds.

Common film speeds include ISO 25, 50, 64, 100, 160, 200, 400, 800, 1600 and 3200. Consumer print films are usually in the ISO 100 to ISO 800 range. Some films, like Kodak's Technical Pan, are not ISO rated and therefore careful examination of the film's properties must be made by the photographer before exposure and development. ISO 25 film is very "slow", as it requires much more exposure to produce a usable image than "fast" ISO 800 film. Films of ISO 800 and greater are thus better suited to low-light situations and action shots (where the short exposure time limits the total light received). The benefit of slower film is that it usually has finer grain and better color rendition than fast film. Professional photographers of static subjects such as portraits or landscapes usually seek these qualities, and therefore require a tripod to stabilize the camera for a longer exposure. A professional photographing subjects such as rapidly moving sports or in low-light conditions will inevitably choose a faster film.

A film with a particular ISO rating can be push-processed, or "pushed", to behave like a film with a higher ISO, by developing for a longer amount of time or at a higher temperature than usual. More rarely, a film can be "pulled" to behave like a "slower" film. Pushing generally coarsens grain and increases contrast, reducing dynamic range, to the detriment of overall quality. Nevertheless, it can be a useful tradeoff in difficult shooting environments, if the alternative is no usable shot at all.

=== Special films ===
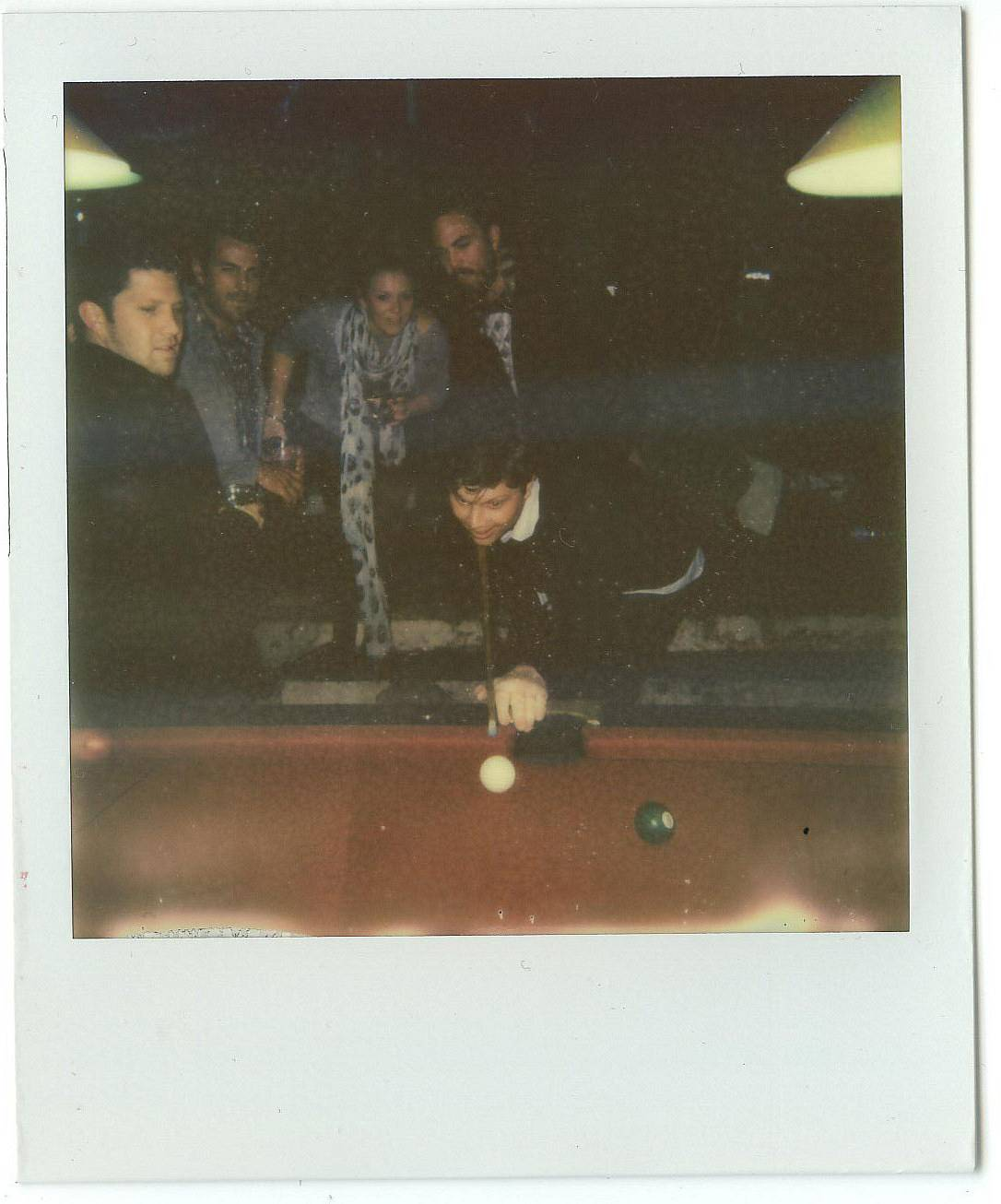
A Polaroid instant photograph

Instant photography, as popularized by Polaroid, uses a special type of camera and film that automates and integrates development, without the need of further equipment or chemicals. This process is carried out immediately after exposure, as opposed to regular film, which is developed afterwards and requires additional chemicals. See instant film.

Films can be made to record non-visible ultraviolet (UV) and infrared (IR) radiation. These films generally require special equipment; for example, most photographic lenses are made of glass and will therefore filter out most ultraviolet light. Instead, expensive lenses made of quartz must be used. Infrared films may be shot in standard cameras using an infrared band- or long-pass filters, although the infrared focal point must be compensated for.

Exposure and focusing are difficult when using UV or IR film with a camera and lens designed for visible light. The ISO standard for film speed only applies to visible light, so visual-spectrum light meters are nearly useless. Film manufacturers can supply suggested equivalent film speeds under different conditions, and recommend heavy bracketing (e.g., "with a certain filter, assume ISO 25 under daylight and ISO 64 under tungsten lighting"). This allows a light meter to be used to estimate an exposure. The focal point for IR is slightly farther away from the camera than visible light, and UV slightly closer; this must be compensated for when focusing. Apochromatic lenses are sometimes recommended due to their improved focusing across the spectrum.

Film optimized for detecting X-ray radiation is commonly used for medical radiography and industrial radiography by placing the subject between the film and a source of X-rays or gamma rays, without a lens, as if a translucent object were imaged by being placed between a light source and standard film. Unlike other types of film, X-ray film has a sensitive emulsion on both sides of the carrier material. This reduces the X-ray exposure for an acceptable image – a desirable feature in medical radiography. The film is usually placed in close contact with phosphor screen(s) and/or thin lead-foil screen(s), the combination having a higher sensitivity to X-rays. Because film is sensitive to x-rays, its contents may be wiped by airport baggage scanners if the film has a speed higher than 800 ISO. This property is exploited in Film badge dosimeters.

Film optimized for detecting X-rays and gamma rays is sometimes used for radiation dosimetry.

Film has a number of disadvantages as a scientific detector: it is difficult to calibrate for photometry, it is not re-usable, it requires careful handling (including temperature and humidity control) for best calibration, and the film must physically be returned to the laboratory and processed. Against this, photographic film can be made with a higher spatial resolution than any other type of imaging detector, and, because of its logarithmic response to light, has a wider dynamic range than most digital detectors. For example, Agfa 10E56 holographic film has a resolution of over 4,000 lines/mm – equivalent to a pixel size of 0.125 micrometers – and an active dynamic range of over five orders of magnitude in brightness, compared to typical scientific CCDs that might have pixels of about 10 micrometers and a dynamic range of 3–4 orders of magnitude.

Special films are used for the long exposures required by astrophotography.

Lith films used in the printing industry. In particular when exposed via a ruled-glass screen or contact-screen, halftone images suitable for printing could be generated.

=== Encoding of metadata ===
Some film cameras have the ability to read metadata from the film canister or encode metadata on film negatives.

==== Negative imprinting ====
Negative imprinting is a feature of some film cameras, in which the date, shutter speed and aperture setting are recorded on the negative directly as the film is exposed. The first known version of this process was patented in the United States in 1975, using half-silvered mirrors to direct the readout of a digital clock and mix it with the light rays coming through the main camera lens. Modern SLR cameras use an imprinter fixed to the back of the camera on the film backing plate. It uses a small LED display for illumination and optics to focus the light onto a specific part of the film. The LED display is exposed on the negative at the same time the picture is taken. Digital cameras can often encode all the information in the image file itself. The Exif format is the most commonly used format.

==== DX codes ====
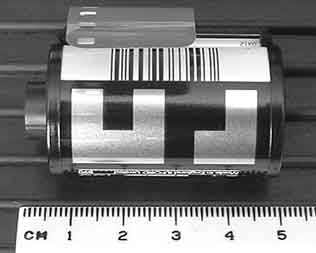
135 Film Cartridge with DX barcode (top) and DX CAS code on the black and white grid below the barcode. The CAS code shows the ISO, number of exposures, exposure latitude (+3/−1 for print film).

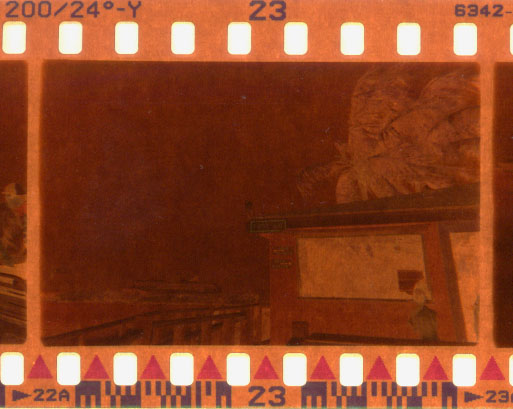
DX film edge barcode

In the 1980s, Kodak developed DX Encoding (from Digital indeX), or DX coding, a feature that was eventually adapted by all camera and film manufacturers. DX encoding provides information on both the film cassette and on the film regarding the type of film, number of exposures, speed (ISO/ASA rating) of the film. It consists of three types of identification. First is a barcode near the film opening of the cassette, identifying the manufacturer, film type and processing method (see image below left). This is used by photofinishing equipment during film processing. The second part is a barcode on the edge of the film (see image below right), used also during processing, which indicates the image film type, manufacturer, frame number and synchronizes the position of the frame. The third part of DX coding, known as the DX Camera Auto Sensing (CAS) code, consists of a series of 12 metal contacts on the film cassette, which beginning with cameras manufactured after 1985 could detect the type of film, number of exposures and ISO of the film, and use that information to automatically adjust the camera settings for the speed of the film.

=== Sizes of film ===
==== Common formats ====
Film Designation	Film width (mm)	Image size (mm)	Number of images	Notes
110	16	13 × 17	12/20/24	Single perforations, cartridge loaded
APS/IX240	24	17 × 30	15/25/40	e.g., Kodak "Advantix", different aspect ratios possible, data recorded on magnetic strip, processed film remains in cartridge
126	35	26 × 26	12/20/24	Single perforations, cartridge loaded, e.g., Kodak Instamatic camera
135	35	24 × 36 (1.0 x 1.5 in.)	12–36	Double perforations, cassette loaded, "35 mm film"
127	46	40 x 40 (also 40 x 30 or 60)	8–16	Unperforated, rolled in backing paper.
120	62	45 × 60	16 or 15	Unperforated, rolled in backing paper. For medium format photography
120	62	60 × 60	12	Unperforated, rolled in backing paper. For medium format photography
120	62	60 × 70	10	Unperforated, rolled in backing paper. For medium format photography
120	62	60 × 90	8	Unperforated, rolled in backing paper. For medium format photography
220	62	45 × 60	32 or 31	Same as 120, but rolled with no backing paper, allowing for double the number of images. Unperforated film with leader and trailer.
220	62	60 × 60	24	Same as 120, but rolled with no backing paper, allowing for double the number of images. Unperforated film with leader and trailer.
220	62	60 × 70	20	Same as 120, but rolled with no backing paper, allowing for double the number of images. Unperforated film with leader and trailer.
220	62	60 × 90	16	Same as 120, but rolled with no backing paper, allowing for double the number of images. Unperforated film with leader and trailer.
Sheet film		Various sizes, from 2 ¼ x 3 ¼ to 20 x 24 in. and larger	1	Individual sheets of film, notched in corner for identification, for large format photography
Disc film		10 × 8 mm	15	
Motion picture films	Super 8		50 ft cassette	Packaged in a drop-in cassette, loaded in daylight.
Motion picture films	8 mm		25 ft spools (50 ft of footage)	16mm film with twice the number of perforations. Loaded in the camera on a spool in subdued light and flipped over halfway through filming to expose both sides of the film.
Motion picture films	16 mm		100 ft spools, 400 ft rolls	100 ft spool loaded in subdued light, 400 ft rolls loaded in darkness.
Motion picture films	35 mm		100 ft spools, 400, 1000 ft rolls	100 ft spool loaded in subdued light (discontinued), 400 and 1000 ft rolls loaded in darkness.
Motion picture films	65 mm		400, 500, 1000 ft rolls	All rolls loaded in darkness.

==== Special/uncommon sizes ====
Film type	Film width	Notes
Microfilm	16 mm, 35 mm, 105 mm	Very high resolution films for archiving documents such as newspapers, books, engineering drawings, and other materials and records that may need to be preserved for long periods of time.
70mm film	70 mm	Format for use in medium format cameras where reloading frequently is undesirable or impossible. Notably used in the Apollo Program by NASA.
Cirkut camera film	5 in, 6 in, 8 in, 10 in, 16 in	Rolls of film meant for use in Cirkut cameras to make extremely large and detailed Panoramic images
Aerial films	70 mm, 80 mm, 5 in, 19 cm, 9.5 in/24 cm, 32 cm	Previously used for aerial reconnaissance by military organizations via reconnaissance aircraft, high-altitude balloons, and reconnaissance satellites. Used by civilian organizations for land surveying and land management.

== History ==
The earliest practical photographic process was the daguerreotype; it was introduced in 1839 and did not use film. The light-sensitive chemicals were formed on the surface of a silver-plated copper sheet. The calotype process produced paper negatives. Beginning in the 1850s, thin glass plates coated with photographic emulsion became the standard material for use in the camera. Although fragile and relatively heavy, the glass used for photographic plates was of better optical quality than early transparent plastics and was, at first, less expensive. Glass plates continued to be used long after the introduction of film, and were used for astrophotography and electron micrography until the early 2000s, when they were supplanted by digital recording methods. Ilford continues to manufacture glass plates for special scientific applications.

The first flexible photographic roll film was sold by George Eastman in 1885, but this original "film" was actually a coating on a paper base. As part of the processing, the image-bearing layer was stripped from the paper and attached to a sheet of hardened clear gelatin. The first transparent plastic roll film followed in 1889. It was made from highly flammable cellulose nitrate film.

Although cellulose acetate or "safety film" had been introduced by Kodak in 1908, at first it found only a few special applications as an alternative to the hazardous nitrate film, which had the advantages of being considerably tougher, slightly more transparent, and cheaper. The changeover was completed for X-ray films in 1933, but although safety film was always used for 16 mm and 8 mm home movies, nitrate film remained standard for theatrical 35 mm films until it was finally discontinued in 1951.

Hurter and Driffield began pioneering work on the light sensitivity of photographic emulsions in 1876. Their work enabled the first quantitative measure of film speed to be devised. They developed H&D curves, which are specific for each film and paper. These curves plot the photographic density against the log of the exposure, to determine sensitivity or speed of the emulsion and enabling correct exposure.

=== Spectral sensitivity ===
Early photographic plates and films were usefully sensitive only to blue, violet and ultraviolet light. As a result, the relative tonal values in a scene registered roughly as they would appear if viewed through a piece of deep blue glass. Blue skies with interesting cloud formations photographed as a white blank. Any detail visible in masses of green foliage was due mainly to the colorless surface gloss. Bright yellows and reds appeared nearly black. Most skin tones came out unnaturally dark, and uneven or freckled complexions were exaggerated. Photographers sometimes compensated by adding in skies from separate negatives that had been exposed and processed to optimize the visibility of the clouds, by manually retouching their negatives to adjust problematic tonal values, and by heavily powdering the faces of their portrait sitters.

In 1873, Hermann Wilhelm Vogel discovered that the spectral sensitivity could be extended to green and yellow light by adding very small quantities of certain dyes to the emulsion. The instability of early sensitizing dyes and their tendency to rapidly cause fogging initially confined their use to the laboratory, but in 1883 the first commercially dye-sensitized plates appeared on the market. These early products, described as isochromatic or orthochromatic depending on the manufacturer, made possible a more accurate rendering of colored subject matter into a black-and-white image. Because they were still disproportionately sensitive to blue, the use of a yellow filter and a consequently longer exposure time were required to take full advantage of their extended sensitivity.

In 1894, the Lumière Brothers introduced their Lumière Panchromatic plate, which was made sensitive, although very unequally, to all colors including red. New and improved sensitizing dyes were developed, and in 1902 the much more evenly color-sensitive Perchromo panchromatic plate was being sold by the German manufacturer Perutz. The commercial availability of highly panchromatic black-and-white emulsions also accelerated the progress of practical color photography, which requires good sensitivity to all the colors of the spectrum for the red, green and blue channels of color information to all be captured with reasonable exposure times.

However, all of these were glass-based plate products. Panchromatic emulsions on a film base were not commercially available until the 1910s and did not come into general use until much later. Many photographers who did their own darkroom work preferred to go without the seeming luxury of sensitivity to red – a rare color in nature and uncommon even in human-made objects – rather than be forced to abandon the traditional red darkroom safelight and process their exposed film in complete darkness. Kodak's popular Verichrome black-and-white snapshot film, introduced in 1931, remained a red-insensitive orthochromatic product until 1956, when it was replaced by Verichrome Pan. Amateur darkroom enthusiasts then had to handle the undeveloped film by the sense of touch alone.

=== Introduction to color ===
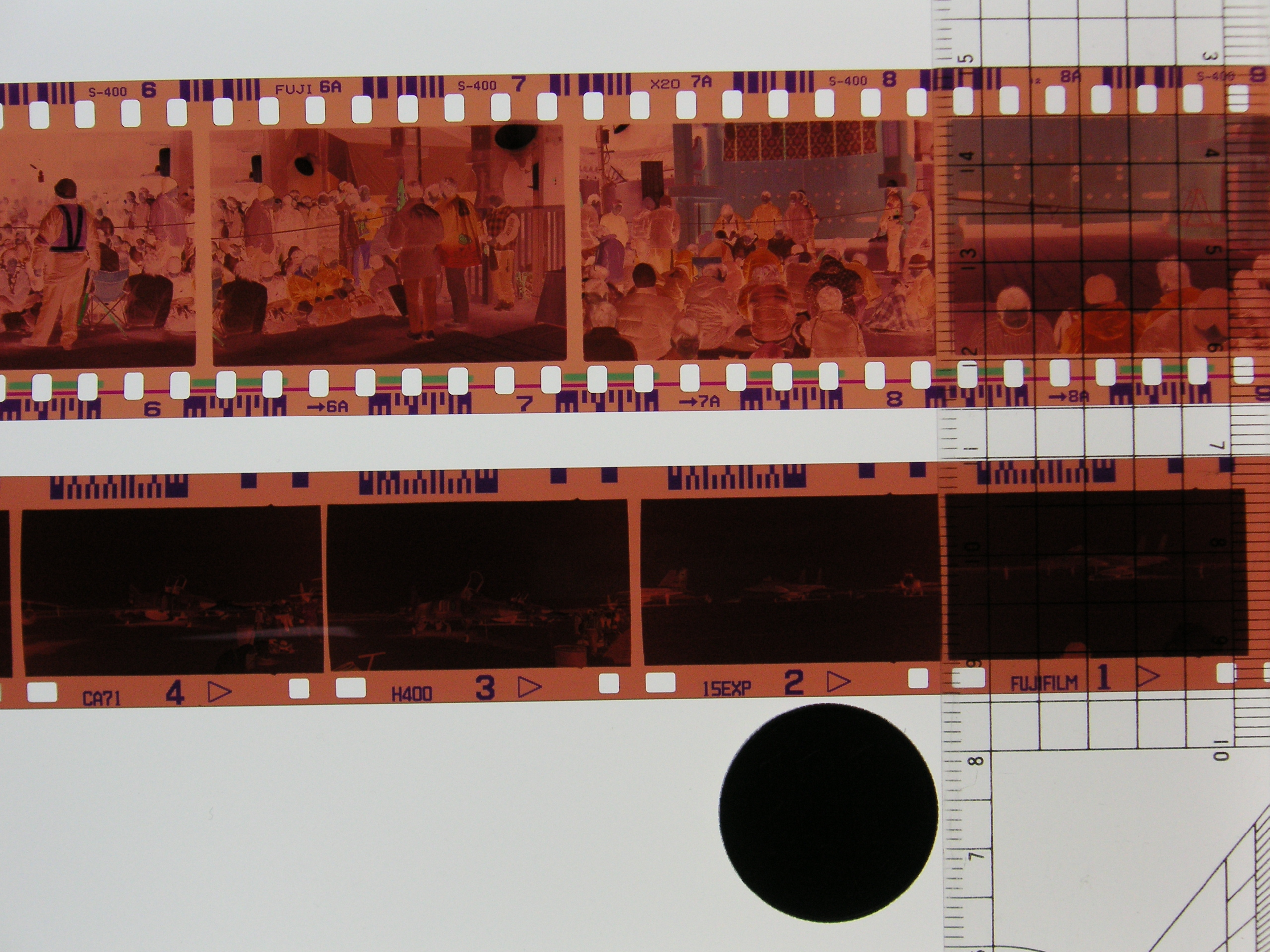
35mm film (top) and APS film (bottom).

Experiments with color photography began almost as early as photography itself, but the three-color principle underlying all practical processes was not set forth until 1855, not demonstrated until 1861, and not generally accepted as "real" color photography until it had become an undeniable commercial reality in the early 20th century. Although color photographs of good quality were being made by the 1890s, they required special equipment, separate and long exposures through three color filters, complex printing or display procedures, and highly specialized skills, so they were then exceedingly rare.

The first practical and commercially successful color "film" was the Lumière Autochrome, a glass plate product introduced in 1907. It was expensive and not sensitive enough for hand-held "snapshot" use. Film-based versions were introduced in the early 1930s and the sensitivity was later improved. These were "mosaic screen" additive color products, which used a simple layer of black-and-white emulsion in combination with a layer of microscopically small color filter elements. The resulting transparencies or "slides" were very dark because the color filter mosaic layer absorbed most of the light passing through. The last films of this type were discontinued in the 1950s, but Polachrome "instant" slide film, introduced in 1983, temporarily revived the technology.

"Color film" in the modern sense of a subtractive color product with a multi-layered emulsion was born with the introduction of Kodachrome for home movies in 1935 and as lengths of 35 mm film for still cameras in 1936; however, it required a complex development process, with multiple dyeing steps as each color layer was processed separately. 1936 also saw the launch of Agfa Color Neu, the first subtractive three-color reversal film for movie and still camera use to incorporate color dye couplers, which could be processed at the same time by a single color developer. The film had some 278 patents. The incorporation of color couplers formed the basis of subsequent color film design, with the Agfa process initially adopted by Ferrania, Fuji and Konica and lasting until the late 70s/early 1980s in the West and 1990s in Eastern Europe. The process used dye-forming chemicals that terminated with sulfonic acid groups and had to be coated one layer at a time. It was a further innovation by Kodak, using dye-forming chemicals which terminated in 'fatty' tails which permitted multiple layers to coated at the same time in a single pass, reducing production time and cost that later became universally adopted along with the Kodak C-41 process.

Despite greater availability of color film after WWII during the next several decades, it remained much more expensive than black-and-white and required much more light, factors which combined with the greater cost of processing and printing delayed its widespread adoption. Decreasing cost, increasing sensitivity and standardized processing gradually overcame these impediments. By the 1970s, color film predominated in the consumer market, while the use of black-and-white film was increasingly confined to photojournalism and fine art photography.

=== Effect on lens and equipment design ===
Photographic lenses and equipment are designed around the film to be used. Although the earliest photographic materials were sensitive only to the blue-violet end of the spectrum, partially color-corrected achromatic lenses were normally used, so that when the photographer brought the visually brightest yellow rays to a sharp focus, the visually dimmest but photographically most active violet rays would be correctly focused, too. The introduction of orthochromatic emulsions required the whole range of colors from yellow to blue to be brought to an adequate focus. Most plates and films described as orthochromatic or isochromatic were practically insensitive to red, so the correct focus of red light was unimportant; a red window could be used to view the frame numbers on the paper backing of roll film, as any red light which leaked around the backing would not fog the film; and red lighting could be used in darkrooms. With the introduction of panchromatic film, the whole visible spectrum needed to be brought to an acceptably sharp focus. In all cases a color cast in the lens glass or faint colored reflections in the image were of no consequence as they would merely change the contrast a little. This was no longer acceptable when using color film. More highly corrected lenses for newer emulsions could be used with older emulsion types, but the converse was not true.

The progression of lens design for later emulsions is of practical importance when considering the use of old lenses, still often used on large-format equipment; a lens designed for orthochromatic film may have visible defects with a color emulsion; a lens for panchromatic film will be better but not as good as later designs.

The filters used were different for the different film types.

=== Decline ===
Film remained the dominant form of photography until the early 21st century, when advances in digital photography drew consumers to digital formats. The first consumer electronic camera, the Sony Mavica was released in 1981, the first digital camera, the Fuji DS-X released in 1989, coupled with advances in software such as Adobe Photoshop which was released in 1989, improvements in consumer level digital color printers and increasingly widespread computers in households during the late 20th century facilitated uptake of digital photography by consumers.

The initial take up of digital cameras in the 1990s was slow due to their high cost and relatively low resolution of the images (compared to 35mm film), but began to make inroads among consumers in the point and shoot market and in professional applications such as sports photography where speed of results including the ability to upload pictures direct from stadia was more critical for newspaper deadlines than resolution. A key difference compared to film was that early digital cameras were soon obsolete, forcing users into a frequent cycle of replacement until the technology began to mature, whereas previously people might have only owned one or two film cameras in their lifetime. Consequently, photographers demanding higher quality in sectors such as weddings, portraiture and fashion where medium format film predominated were the last to switch once resolution began to reach acceptable levels with the advent of 'full frame' sensors, 'digital backs' and medium format digital cameras.

Film camera sales based on CIPA figures peaked in 1998, before declining rapidly after 2000 to reach almost zero by the end of 2005 as consumers switched en masse to digital cameras (sales of which subsequently peaked in 2010). These changes foretold a similar reduction in film sales. Figures for Fujifilm show global film sales, having grown 30% in the preceding five years, peaked around the year 2000. Film sales then began a period of year-on-year falling sales, of increasing magnitude from 2003 to 2008, reaching 30% per annum before slowing. By 2011, sales were less than 10% of the peak volumes. Similar patterns were experienced by other manufacturers, varying by market exposure, with global film sales estimated at 200 million rolls in 1999 declining to only 5 million rolls by 2009. This period wreaked havoc on the film manufacturing industry and its supply chain optimised for high production volumes, plummeting sales saw firms fighting for survival. Agfa-Gevaert's decision to sell off its consumer facing arm (Agfaphoto) in 2004, was followed by a series of bankruptcies of established film manufacturers: Ilford Imaging UK in 2004, Agfaphoto in 2005, Forte in 2007, Foton in 2007, Polaroid in 2001 and 2008, Ferrania in 2009, and Eastman Kodak in 2012 (the latter only surviving after massive downsizing whilst Ilford was rescued by a management buyout). Konica-Minolta closed its film manufacturing business and exited the photographic market entirely in 2006, selling its camera patents to Sony, and Fujifilm successfully moved to rapidly diversify into other markets. The impact of this paradigm shift in technology subsequently rippled though the downstream photo processing and finishing businesses.

Although modern photography is dominated by digital users, film continues to be used by enthusiasts. Film remains the preference of some photographers because of its distinctive "look". (Note: The distinctive "look" of film-based photographs compared to digital images is likely due to a combination of factors, including (1) differences in spectral and tonal sensitivity (S-shaped density to exposure with film, vs. linear response curve for digital CCD sensors c.f.), (2) resolution, and (3) continuity of tone.)

=== Renewed interest in recent years ===
Despite the fact that digital cameras are by far the most commonly used photographic tool and that the selection of available photographic films is much smaller than it once was, sales of photographic film have been on a steady upward trend. Kodak (which was under bankruptcy protection from January 2012 to September 2013) and other companies have noticed this upward trend: Dennis Olbrich, president of the Imaging Paper, Photo Chemicals and Film division at Kodak Alaris, has stated that sales of their photographic films have been growing over the past three or four years. UK-based Ilford have confirmed this trend and conducted extensive research on this subject matter, their research showing that 60% of current film users had only started using film in the past five years and that 30% of current film users were under 35 years old. Annual film sales, which were estimated to reach a low of 5 million rolls in 2009, have since doubled to around 10 million rolls in 2019. A key challenge for the industry is that production relies on the remaining coating facilities that were built for the peak years of demand, but as demand has grown capacity constraints in some of the other process steps which have been downscaled, such as converting film, have caused production bottlenecks for companies such as Kodak.

In 2013 Ferrania, an Italy-based film manufacturer which ceased production of photographic films between the years 2009 and 2010, was acquired by the new Film Ferrania S.R.L taking over a small part of the old company's manufacturing facilities using its former research facility, and re-employed some workers who had been laid off three years earlier when the company stopped production of film. In November of the same year, the company started a crowdfunding campaign with the goal of raising $250,000 to buy tooling and machines from the old factory, with the intention of putting some of the films that had been discontinued back into production, the campaign succeeded and in October 2014 was ended with over $320,000 being raised. In February 2017, Film Ferrania unveiled their "P30" 80 ASA, Panchromatic black and white film, in 35mm format.

Kodak announced on January 5, 2017, that Ektachrome, one of Kodak's most well known transparency films that had been discontinued between 2012 and 2013, would be reformulated and manufactured once again, in 35 mm still and Super 8 motion picture film formats. Following the success of the release, Kodak expanded Ektachrome's format availability by also releasing the film in 120 and 4x5 formats.

Japan-based Fujifilm's instant film "Instax" cameras and paper have also proven to be very successful, and have replaced traditional photographic films as Fujifilm's main film products, while they continue to offer traditional photographic films in various formats and types.

=== Reusable film ===
In 2023, a Finnish chemist Sami Vuori invented a reusable film that uses synthetic hackmanite (Na_{8}Al_{6}Si_{6}O_{24}(Cl,S)_{2}) as the photosensitive medium. The film contains small hackmanite particles that color purple with exposure to ultraviolet radiation (e.g. 254 nm), after which the film is loaded into the camera. Visible light bleaches the hackmanite particles back to white, which gives rise to the formation of a positive image. The film can then be scanned with a typical document scanner and then colored again with UV. If the user wants to spare the image, the film can be put into a dark place, as the bleaching process stops completely in the absence of light.

On top of reusability and not needing any developing or chemicals, another advantage with this type of photochromic film is that it does not need gelatin, which renders it a vegan alternative. However, the main disadvantage is still the film's very slow exposure, requiring hours of exposure time. This means that currently this type of film can be used only in ultra-long-exposure film photography where the subject is e.g. a city center where the photographer wants to fade all movement.

Another reusable film invented by Liou et al. is based on 9-methylacridinium-intercalated clay particles, but erasing the image requires dipping the material in sulfuric acid.

== Image gallery ==
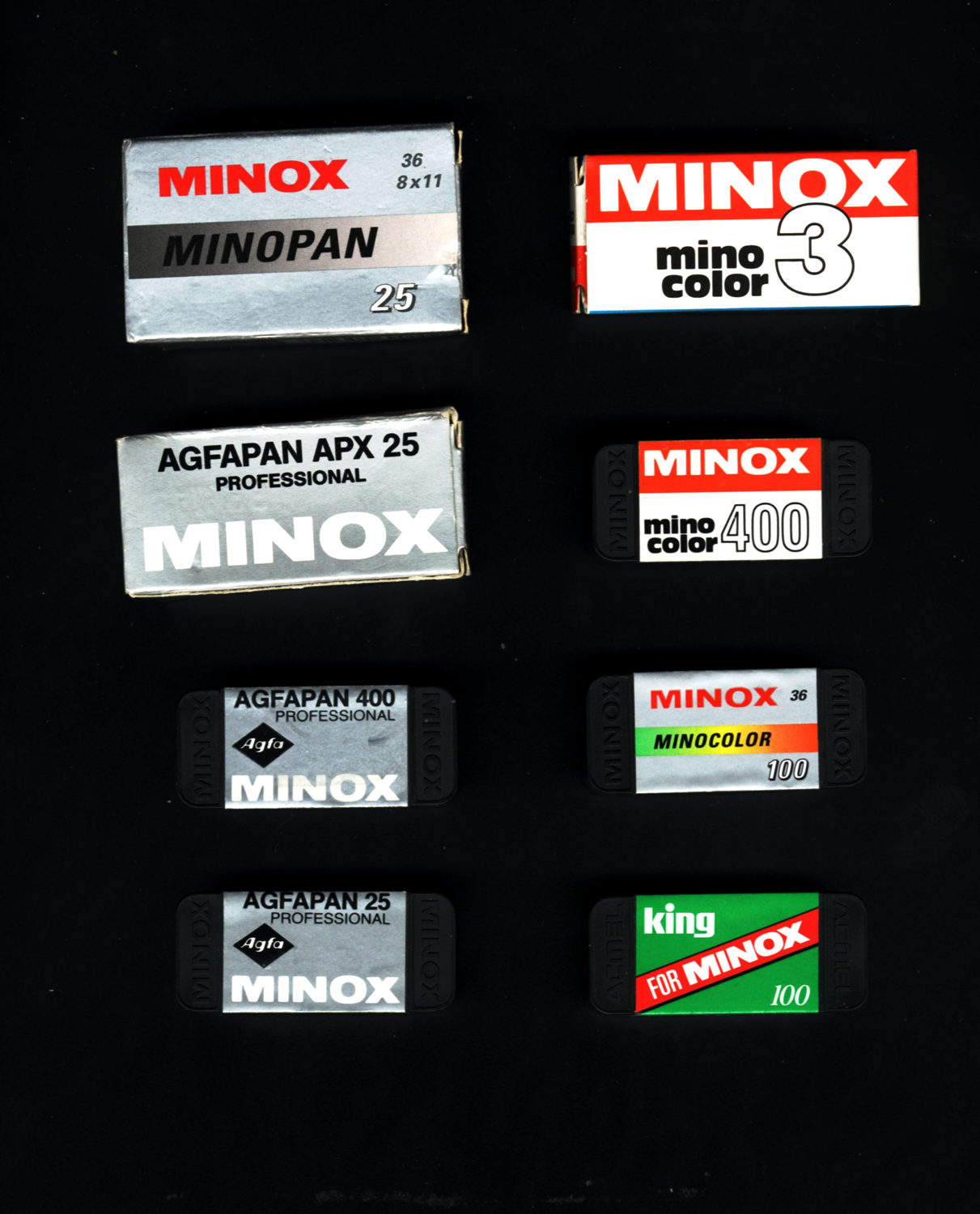
9.5mm film

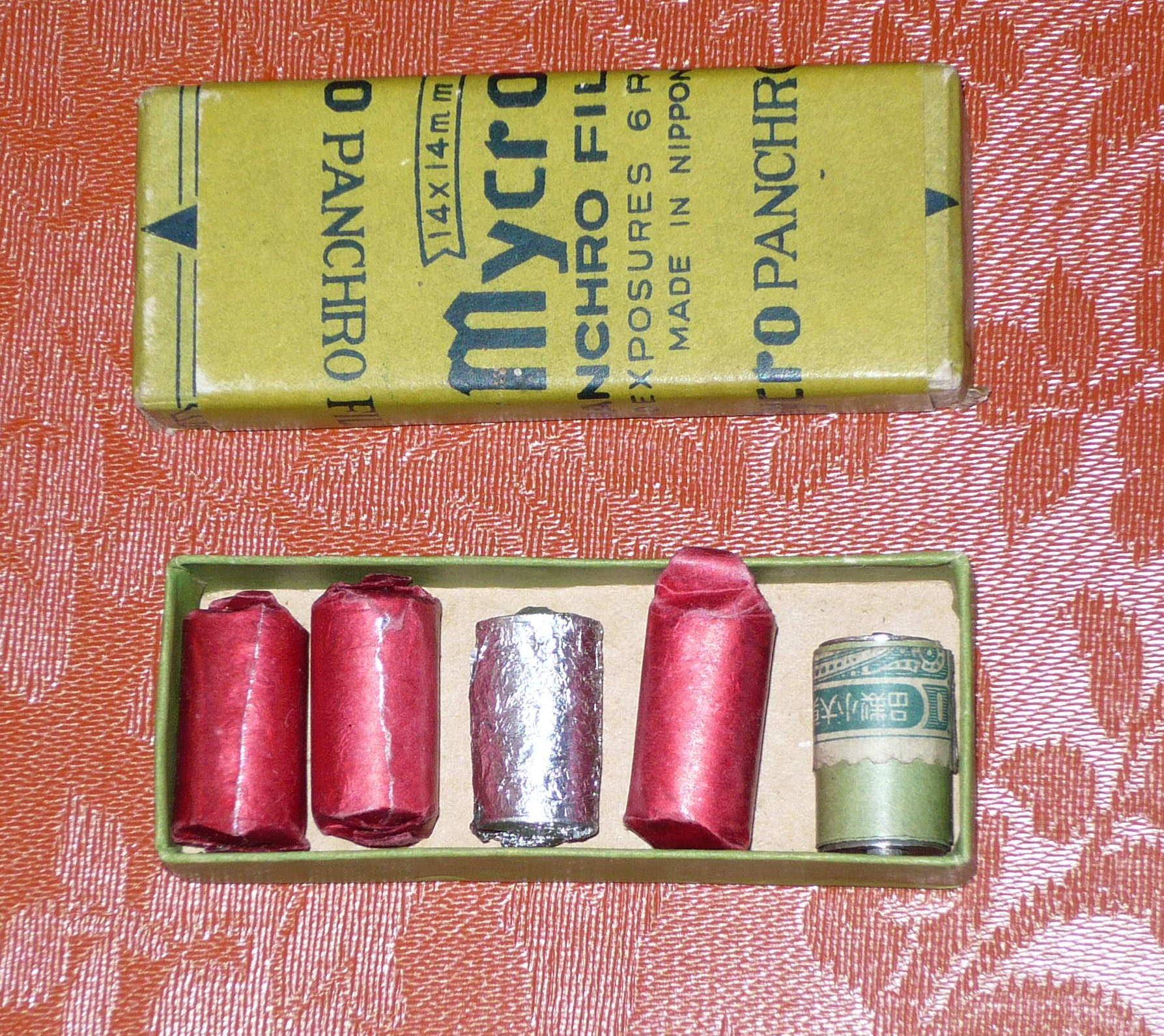
Mycro 17.5mm film

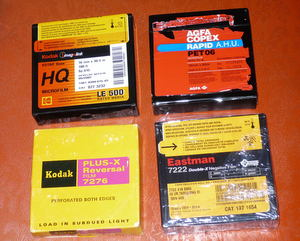
Kodak Agfa 16 mm film

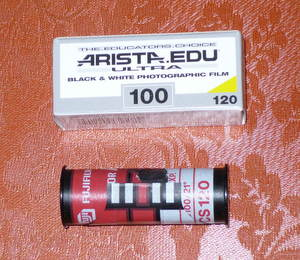
120 film

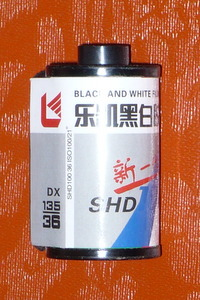
35mm film

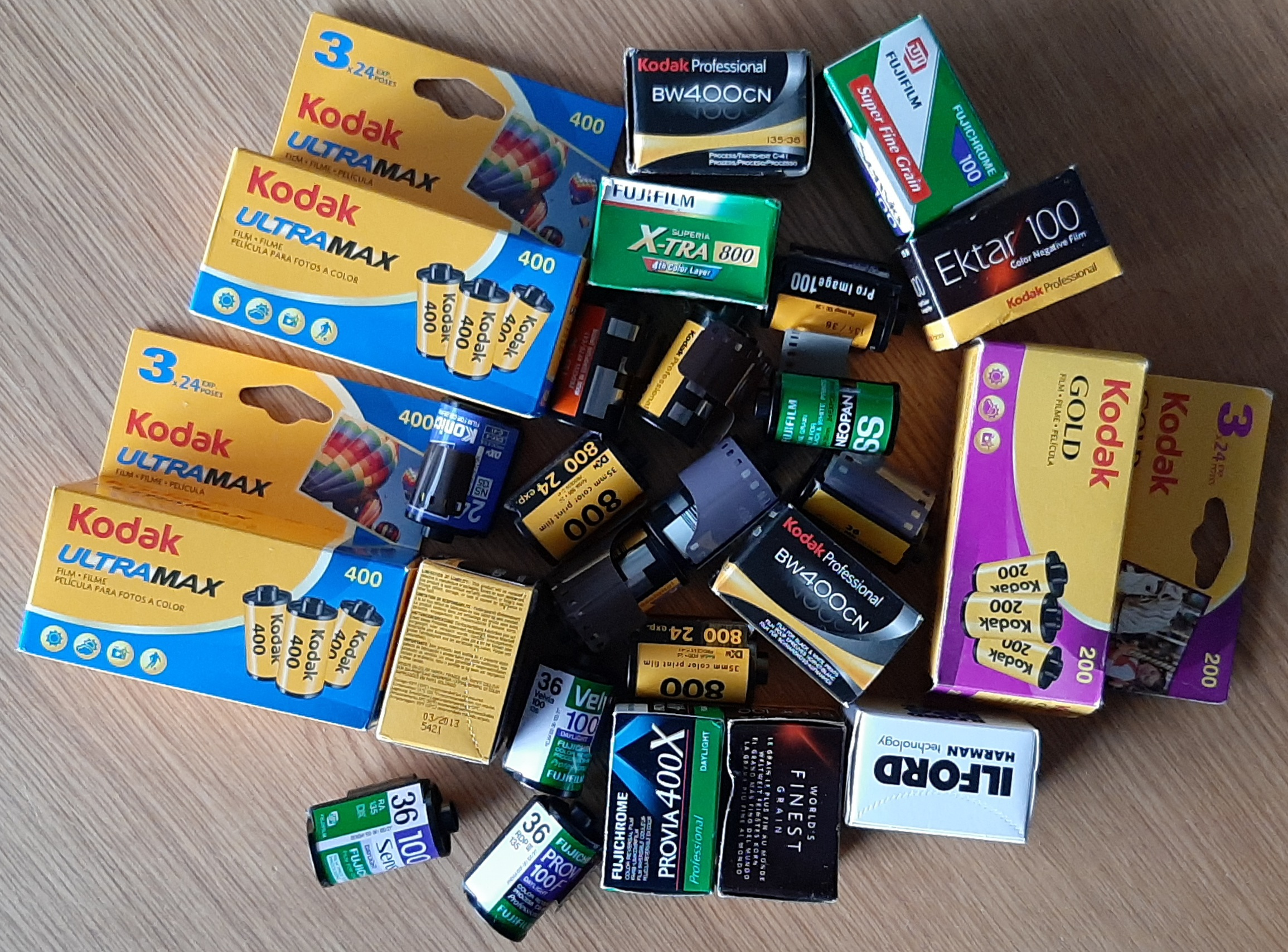
A range of 35mm film

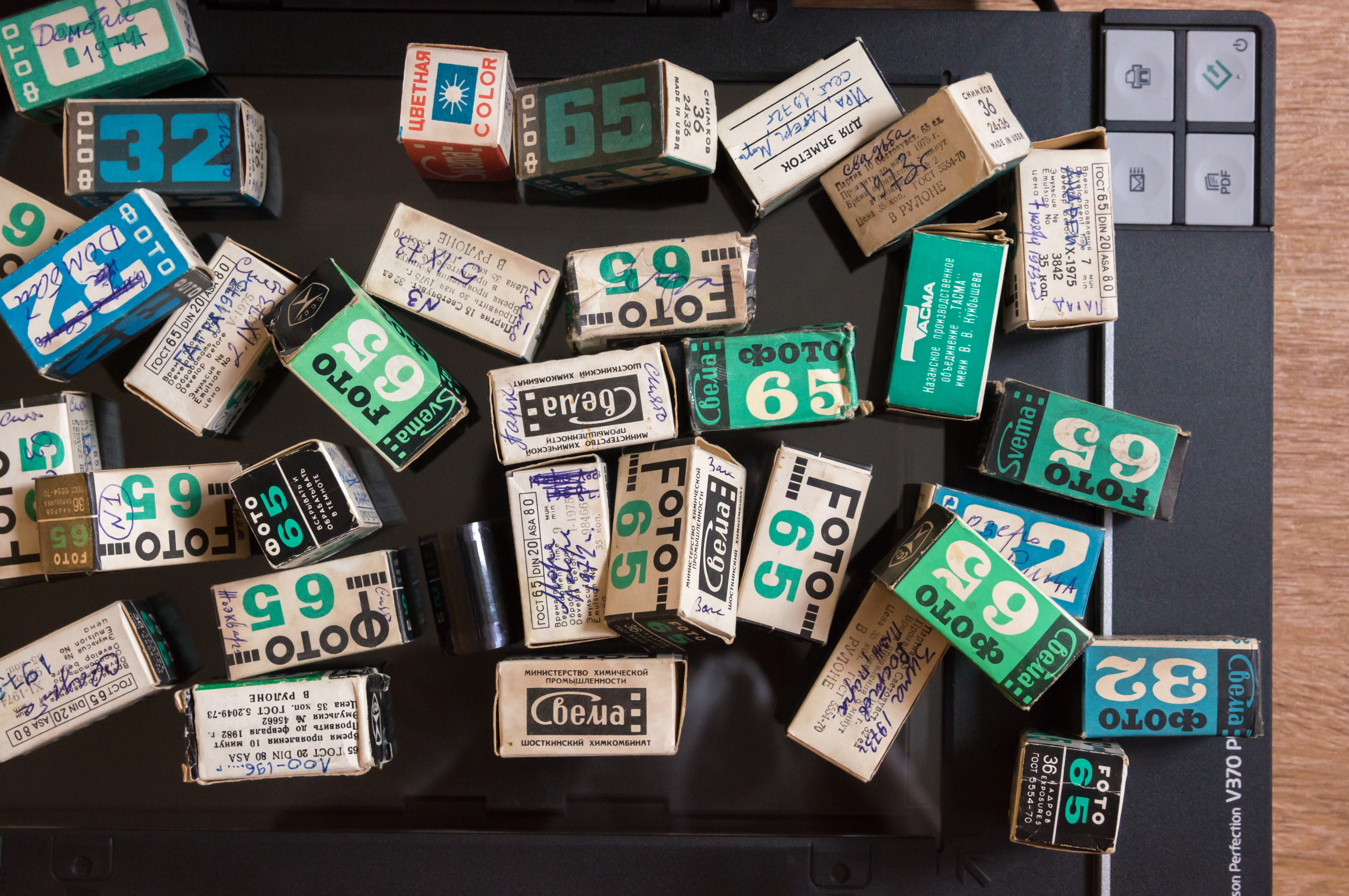
A range of Soviet Svema film

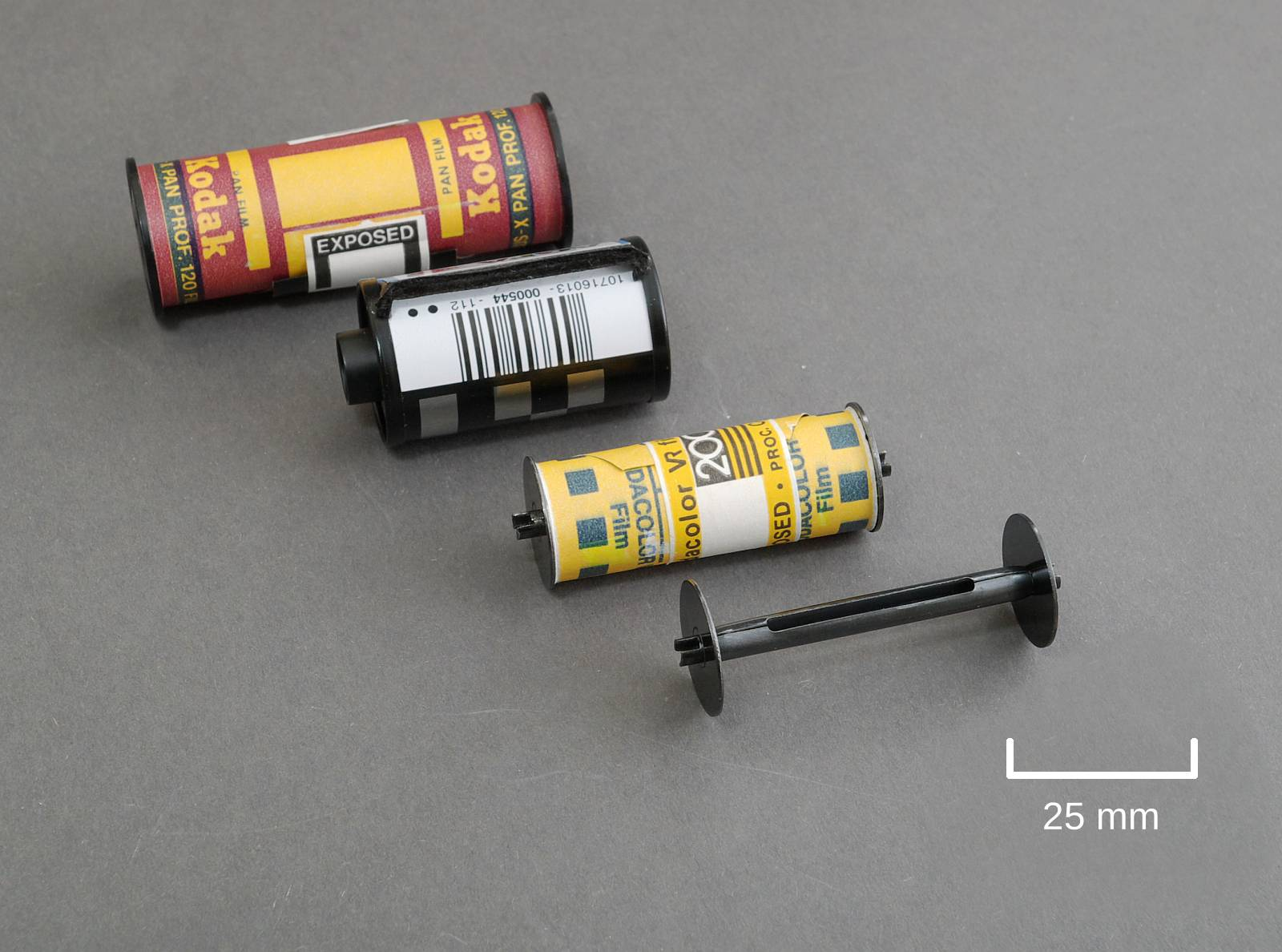
From top: 120, 135 (35mm) and 127 film with a 127 film spool

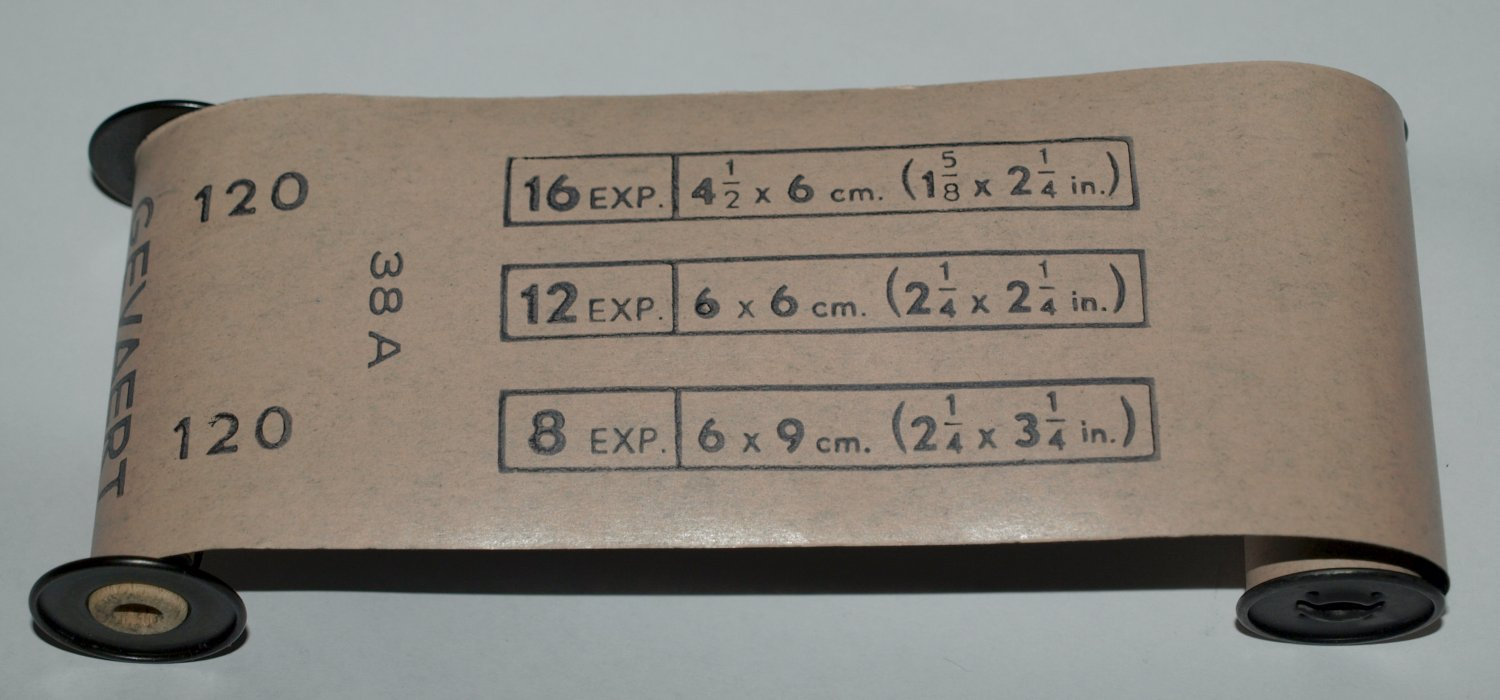
A guide on a roll of 120 film showing how many exposures it can take with different frame sizes

== See also ==
- Videotape
- Fogging (photography)
- List of photographic equipment makers
- List of photographic films
- Oversampled binary image sensor
- Photrio (formerly APUG)
- Tungsten film

== Bibliography ==
- Jacobson, Ralph E. (2000). The Focal Manual of Photography: Photographic and Digital Imaging (9th ed.). Boston: Focal Press. ISBN 978-0-240-51574-8.
- Mees, Kenneth; James, T.H. (1966). Theory of the Photographic Process. Collier Macmillan Ltd. ISBN 978-0023601903.
