= Dark slide (photography) =

Large format photography equipment

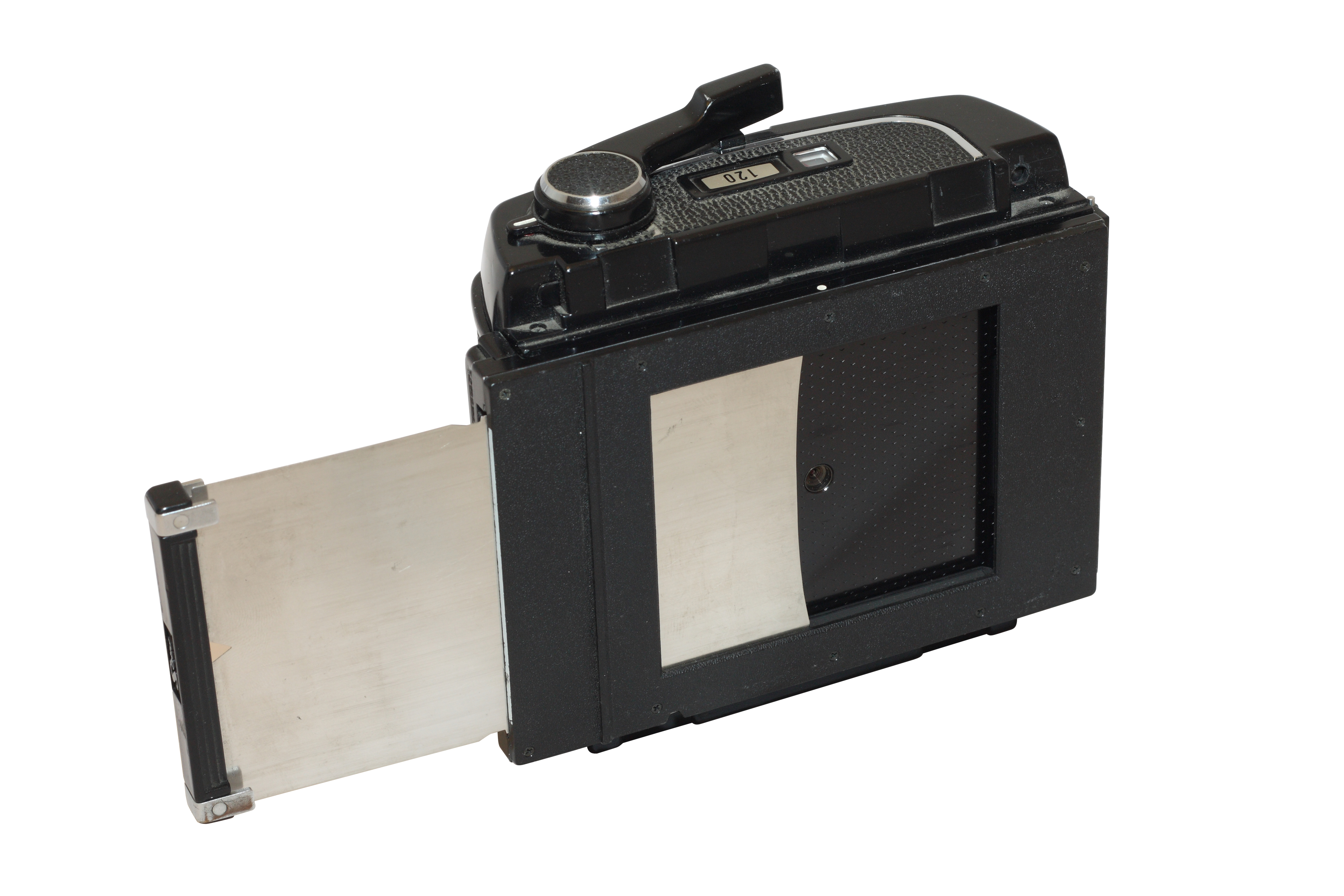
A dark slide on the back of a Mamiya RB67

In photography, a dark slide is a wooden or metal plate that covers the sensitized emulsion side of a photographic plate. In use, a pair of plates joined back to back were used with both plates covered with a dark slide. When used, the dark slide is removed for the period of the exposure and then replaced. Modern dark slides are used in conjunction with a film holder, that either holds in place pieces of cut sheet film or, if modified, some piece of light sensitive material such as glass.

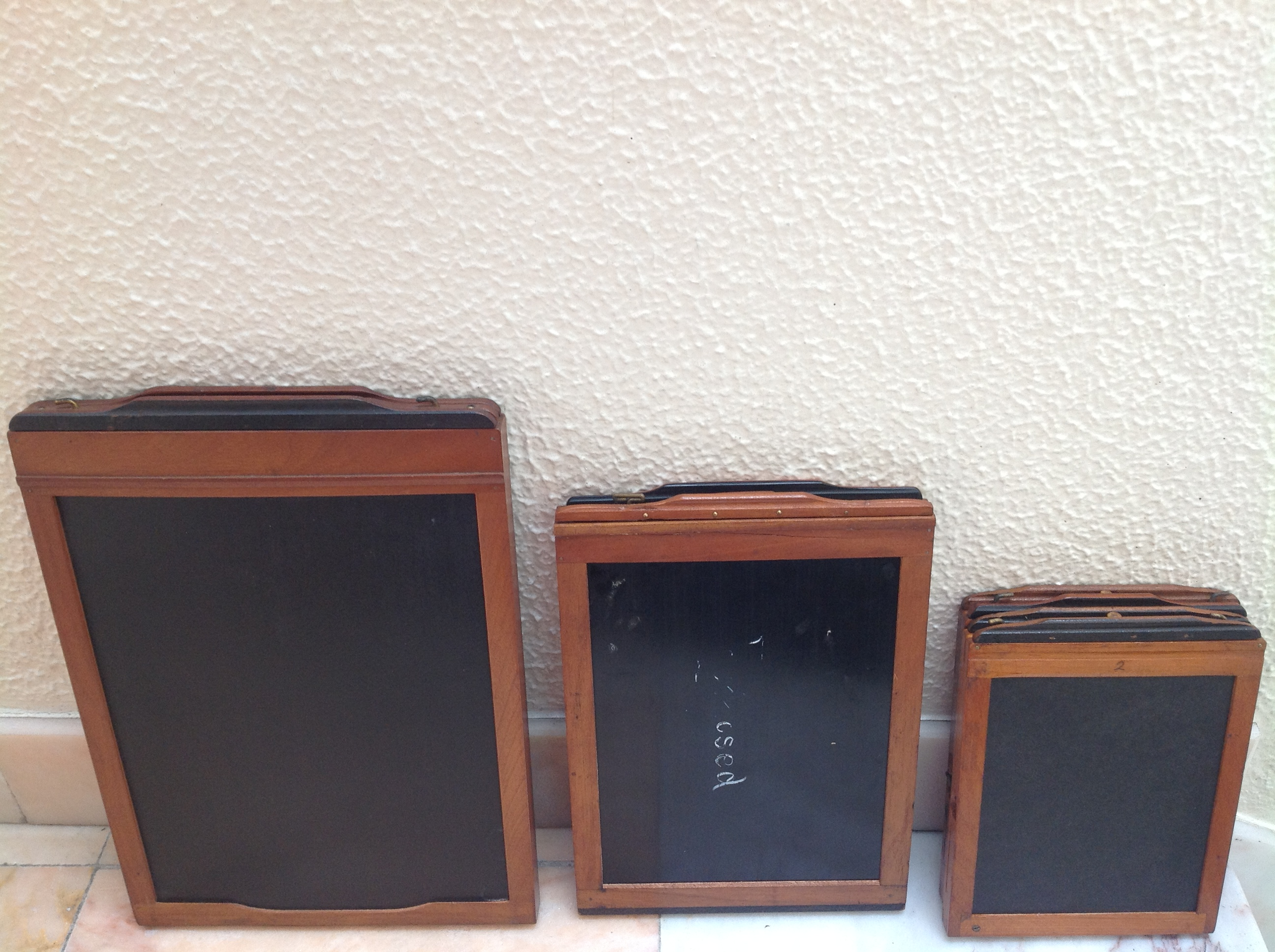
Mahogany double dark slides

In place, the dark slide is in a film holder or magazine. Film holders usually refer to cut sheet film and magazines refer to roll film. Vintage film holders were made of wood and held in place either photo-sensitized plates or photo sensitive film. In either case, the construction must be such to reduce light leaks, or any unwanted light from striking the film until the holder is held in place by a camera and considered "light tight". Some holders held only one piece of light sensitive material, some are double sided and hold two pieces of film.

Once in the camera with a light tight back and light tight bellows, the dark slide may be pulled out for the exposure to be made from a lens. After the exposure, the dark slide is put back in place and the array is put away, usually in a light tight cloth bag or box until it can be taken into a darkroom for development. The term "dark slide" refers to the fact the slide is pulled or slid out of the frame either plastic or wooden. On sliding it back in, the same channels for holding the dark slide are used to cover the film. Ordinarily, in modern film holders, the opening to permit the dark slide to be removed is protected by a strip of black velour or other black baffling that permits the dark slide to move in and out of the holder while restraining the amount of light used by the dark slide while either in place or removed.

A dark slide is used for magazine backs on medium format cameras such as Hasselblad and Mamiya, and plate or sheet film holders on view cameras, like the earlier Reisekamera.
