= Reisekamera =

Historic camera type popular in the late 1800s

Reisekamera 18x24
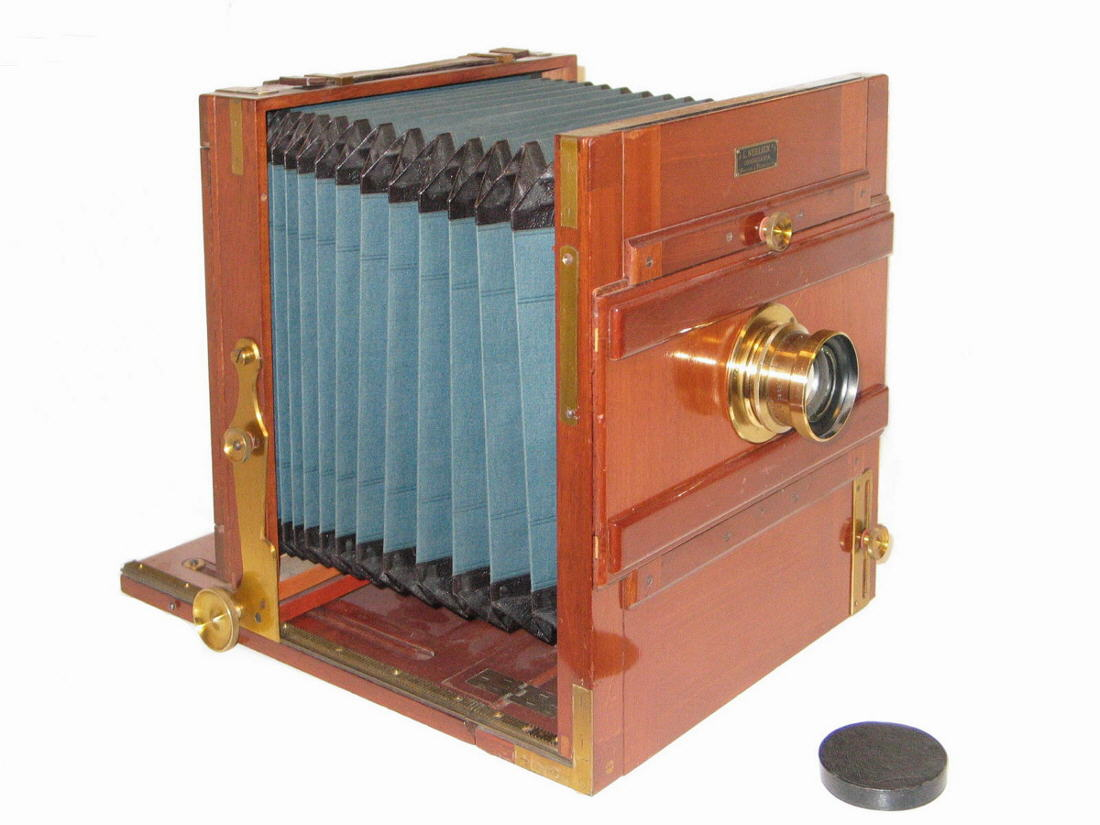

Overview
- Type: Globus M, manufactured by Ernst Herbst & Firl, Görlitz

Focusing
- Focus: 51cm max travel (extension)

General
- Dimensions: 28 ×32 ×38cm body (W×H×D)

The Reisekamera, meaning a "travel camera", is a large-format wooden bellows tailboard view camera of almost standardised design, unlike the much lighter and more flexible field camera, but not as cumbersome as the studio camera. A sturdy tripod is always brought along, but it might just as well be placed on a tabletop. It has equally sized rectangular front and back panels on a full-width double-extension baseboard that is hinged near the front. The front panel, holding the lens plate, has horizontal and vertical movements, while the back is tilt-suspended on brass standards running on brass tracks on either side of the baseboard, providing rack and pinion focusing on the film plane. An almost non-tapering calico double-extension bellows is employed; allowing the projected image to freely reach the photographic plate regardless of lens offset position. The camera folds flat, after the back panel is brought forward to the lens panel, by folding the hinged base board up, and thus conveniently protecting the focusing screen. For insertion of the wooden dark slide plate cassette, the hinged focusing screen is swung up and away. The Reisekamera was made available for several plate sizes; most common are the 13×18 cm, 18×24 cm and 24×30 cm versions. Shutter and lens were normally not part of the original delivery. However, some were made available with a spectacular focal-plane shutter, recognisable by the brass mechanisms either side of the back panel.

The Reisekamera might be considered the portable version of the studio camera, to be used outside the professional photographic studio, on assignment at location, for architectural work or documentation away from the studio, in homes or museums. It is collapsible, yet not small, and it is much too cumbersome and large for the travelling amateur to bring along. The bellows extension would allow a selection of focal length lenses to be employed covering the required field of view. The back panel may be tilted and turned slightly, and at the front, the lens plate may slide vertically and horizontally to control perspective and distortion. The Reisekamera would be one of several cameras suitable for field assignments. A black cloth is required to keep stray light out while observing the image on the ground glass focusing screen. When the image is composed and focused, the focusing screen is replaced by the plate holder. The lens cap is placed on the lens, the dark slide removed from the plate holder, and the lens cap is removed for the required exposure time and replaced. If an auxiliary shutter is present, it may perform the function of the lens cap. After the exposure the dark slide is replaced to protect the exposed plate from stray light. The plate holder is either turned for a second photo, or brought to the darkroom for plate development and copying. The camera would be supplied with a number of plate holders, each usually holding two plates, one on either side.

The Reisekamera was a popular wooden bellows view camera of the tailboard design, manufactured in large quantities in specialised cabinetmaker's workshops of the eastern regions of Germany from about 1860, but reaching peak popularity in the decades around 1900. These cameras would be distributed through well-known camera manufacturers situated in cities like Görlitz or Dresden, but would also emerge elsewhere and abroad, sometimes nameless and sometimes with the distributor or warehouse names attached, a fact causing considerable confusion with regard to origin. The Reisekamera is, regardless of the maker, quite similarly built and of almost standardised design, often without maker's identification. The collector's usual practice to identify some of these cameras by its name plate, if present, or even by the lens attached, results in almost identical cameras being attributed to more than one brand name. The original designer or manufacturer has not been ascertained, but it is thought to originate in the Saxony region of Germany around 1860, and in fact, many Reisekameras came from Dresden or Görlitz in particular. This region had a highly specialised woodwork industry well suited for camera manufacture. As the type became popular, manufacture of similar cameras took place worldwide, but these are more often than not clearly marked with the manufacturer's name.

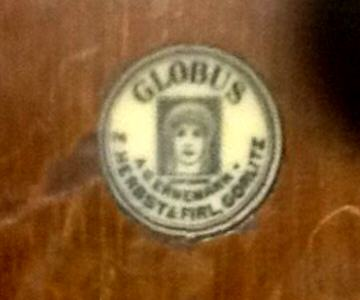
Possibly the best known Reisekamera is the Globus, manufactured by Ernst Herbst & Firl, Görlitz for the camera manufacturer Heinrich Ernemann in Dresden.
