= Large format =

Imaging format of 4×5 inches or larger

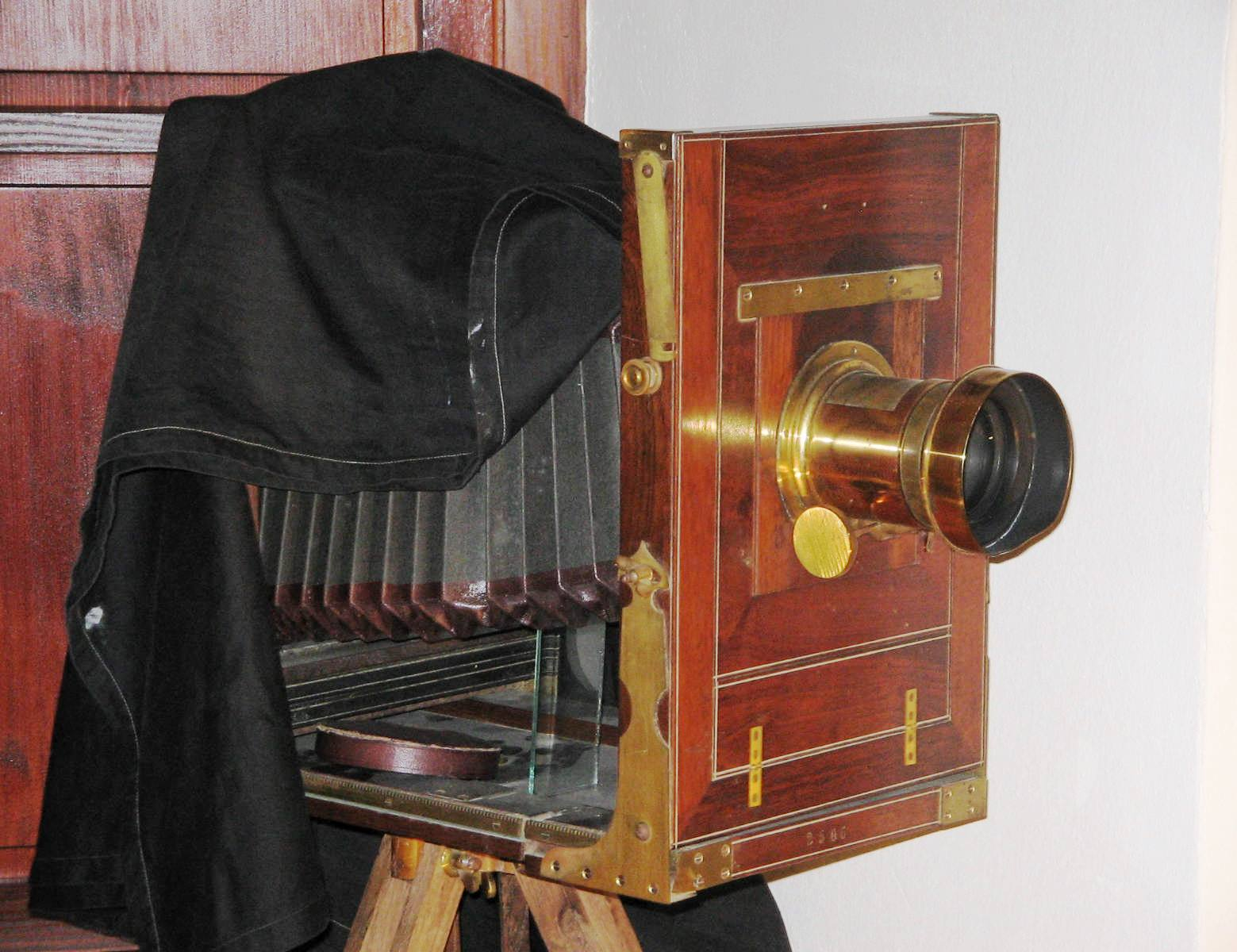
Old studio camera

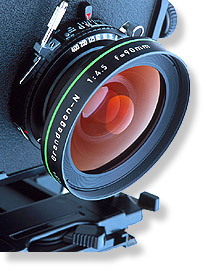
Lens and mounting of a large format camera

Comparison of 35 mm, medium format, and large format

Large format photography refers to any imaging format of 9 cm × 12 cm (3.5 in × 4.7 in) or larger. Large format is larger than "medium format", the 6 cm × 6 cm (2.4 in × 2.4 in) or 6 cm × 9 cm (2.4 in × 3.5 in) size of Hasselblad, Mamiya, Rollei, Kowa, and Pentax cameras (using 120- and 220-roll film), and much larger than the 24 mm × 36 mm (0.94 in × 1.42 in) frame of 35 mm format.

The main advantage of a large format, film or digital, is a higher resolution at the same pixel pitch, or the same resolution with larger pixels or grains. A 4×5 inch image (12,903 mm^{2}) has about 15 times the area, and thus 15 times the total resolution, of a 35 mm frame (864 mm^{2}).

Large format cameras were some of the earliest photographic devices, and before enlargers were common, it was normal to just make 1:1 contact prints from a 4×5, 5×7, or 8×10-inch negative.

== Formats ==
The most common large format is 4 in × 5 in (10 cm × 13 cm), which was the size used by cameras like the Graflex Speed Graphic and Crown Graphic, among others. Less common formats include quarter-plate (3.25 in × 4.25 in (8.3 cm × 10.8 cm)), 5 in × 7 in (13 cm × 18 cm), and 8 in × 10 in (20 cm × 25 cm); the size of many old 1920s Kodak cameras (various versions of Kodak 1, 2, and 3 and Master View cameras, to much later Sinar monorail studio cameras) are 11 in × 14 in (28 cm × 36 cm), 16 in × 20 in (41 cm × 51 cm), 20 in × 24 in (51 cm × 61 cm), various panoramic or "banquet" formats (such as 4 × 10 and 8 × 20 inches (10 × 25 and 20 × 51 cm), and metric formats, including 9 cm × 12 cm (3.5 in × 4.7 in), 10 cm × 13 cm (3.9 in × 5.1 in), and 13 cm × 18 cm (5.1 in × 7.1 in) and assorted old and current aerial image formats of 9 in × 9 in (23 cm × 23 cm), 9 in × 18 in (23 cm × 46 cm) (K17, K18, K19, K22 etc.), using roll film of 4, 5, 6, 7, 9, or 10 inches width or, view cameras (including pinhole cameras), reproduction/process cameras, and x-ray film.

Above 8 × 10 inches, the formats are often referred to as Ultra Large Format (ULF) and may be 11 × 14, 16 × 20, or 20 × 24 inches or as large as film, plates, or cameras are available. Many large formats (e.g., 24 × 24, 36 × 36, and 48 × 48 inches) are horizontal cameras designed to make big negatives for contact printing onto press-printing plates.

The Polaroid 20×24 camera is one of the largest format instant cameras in common usage and can be hired from Polaroid agents in various countries. Many well-known photographers have used the 235 pounds (107 kg), wheeled-chassis Polaroid.

== Control ==
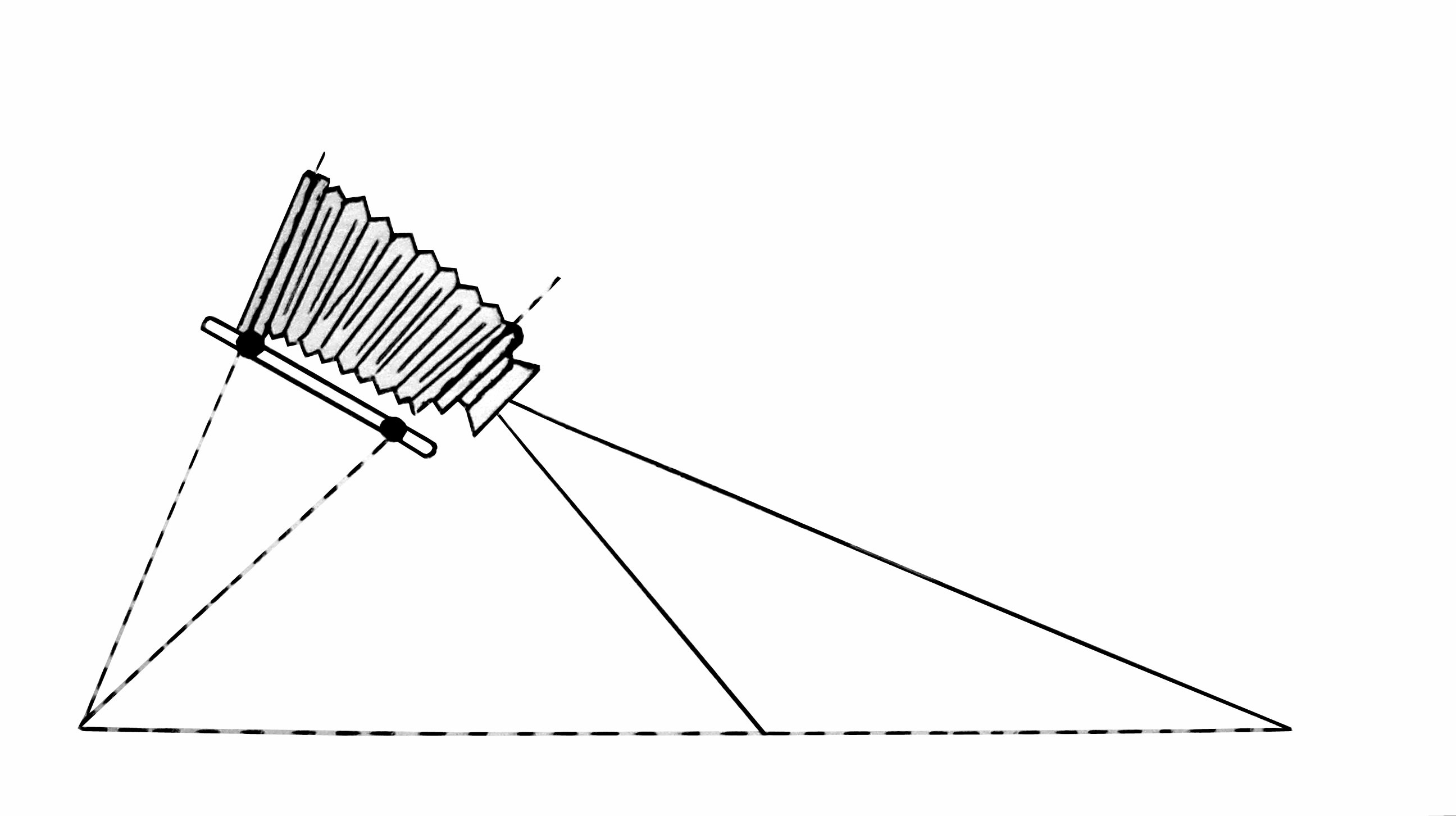
Scheimpflug principle

Most, but not all, large format cameras are view cameras, with fronts and backs called "standards" that allow the photographer to better control rendering of perspective and increase apparent depth of field. Architectural and close-up photographers in particular benefit greatly from this ability. These allow the front and back of the camera to be shifted up/down and left/right (useful, for example, in architectural photography when the subject is higher or lower than the camera), and tilted out of parallel with each other left/right, up/down, or both; based on the Scheimpflug principle. The shift and tilt movements make it possible to solve otherwise impossible depth-of-field problems, and to change perspective rendering, and create special effects that would be impossible with a conventional fixed-plane fixed-lens camera.

Ansel Adams' photographs, and those of the other Group f/64 photographers, demonstrate how the use of front (lens plane) and back (film plane) adjustments can secure great apparent depth of field when using the movements available on large format view cameras.

== Operation ==
A number of actions need to be taken to use a typical large format camera, resulting in a slower, often more contemplative, photographic style. For example, film loading using sheet film holders requires a dark space to load and unload the film, typically a changing bag or darkroom, although prepackaged film magazines and large format roll films have also been used in the past.

A tripod is typically used for view camera work, but some models are designed for hand-held use. These "technical cameras" have separate viewfinders and rangefinders for faster handling.

In general large format camera use, the scene is composed on the camera's ground glass, and then a film holder is fitted to the camera back prior to exposure. A separate Polaroid back using instant film is used by some photographers, allowing previewing of the composition, correctness of exposure and depth of field before committing the image to film to be developed later. Failure to "Polaroid" an exposure risks discovery later, at the time of film development, that there was an error in camera setup.

== Uses ==
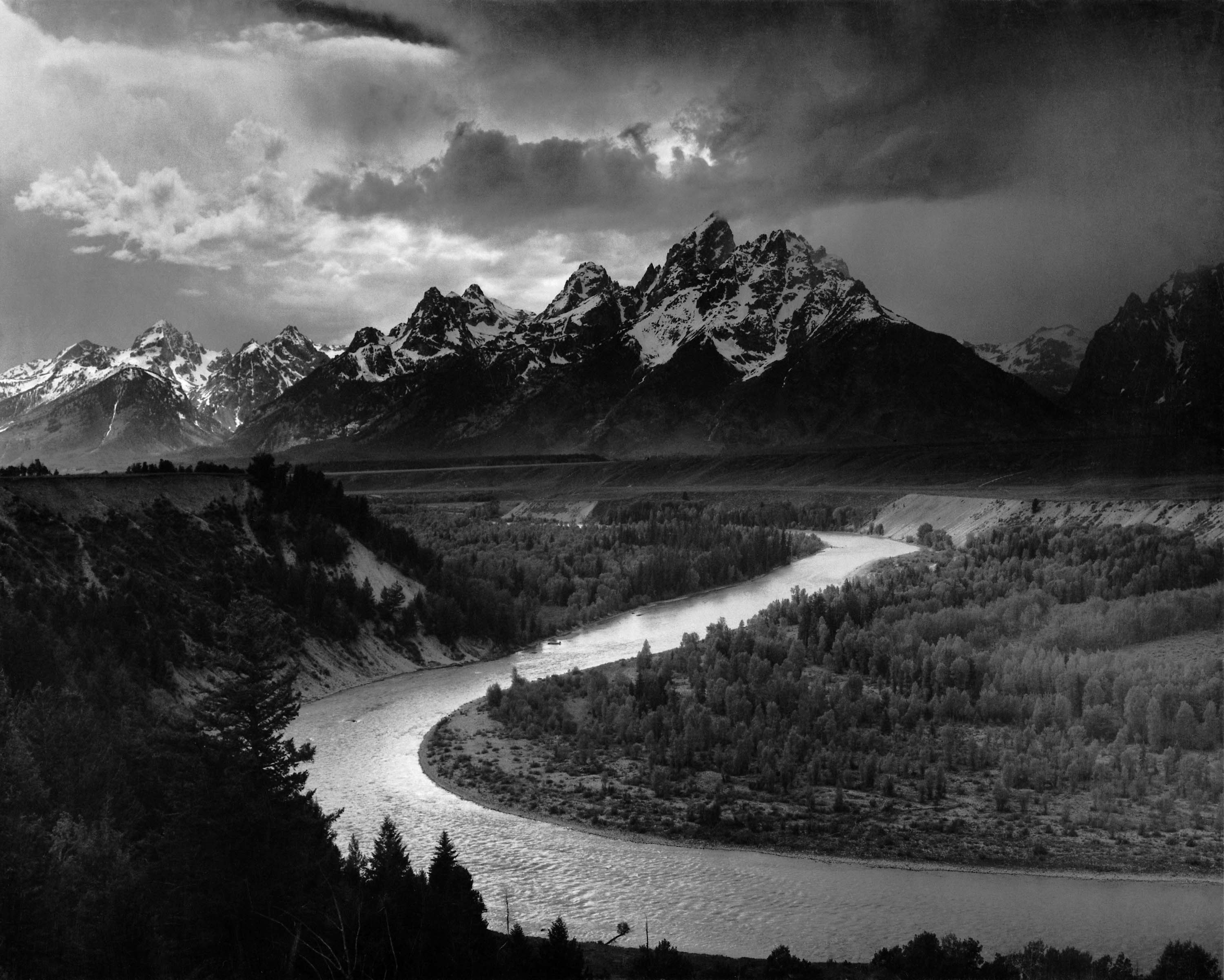
Ansel Adams's large format photograph The Tetons and the Snake River (1942)

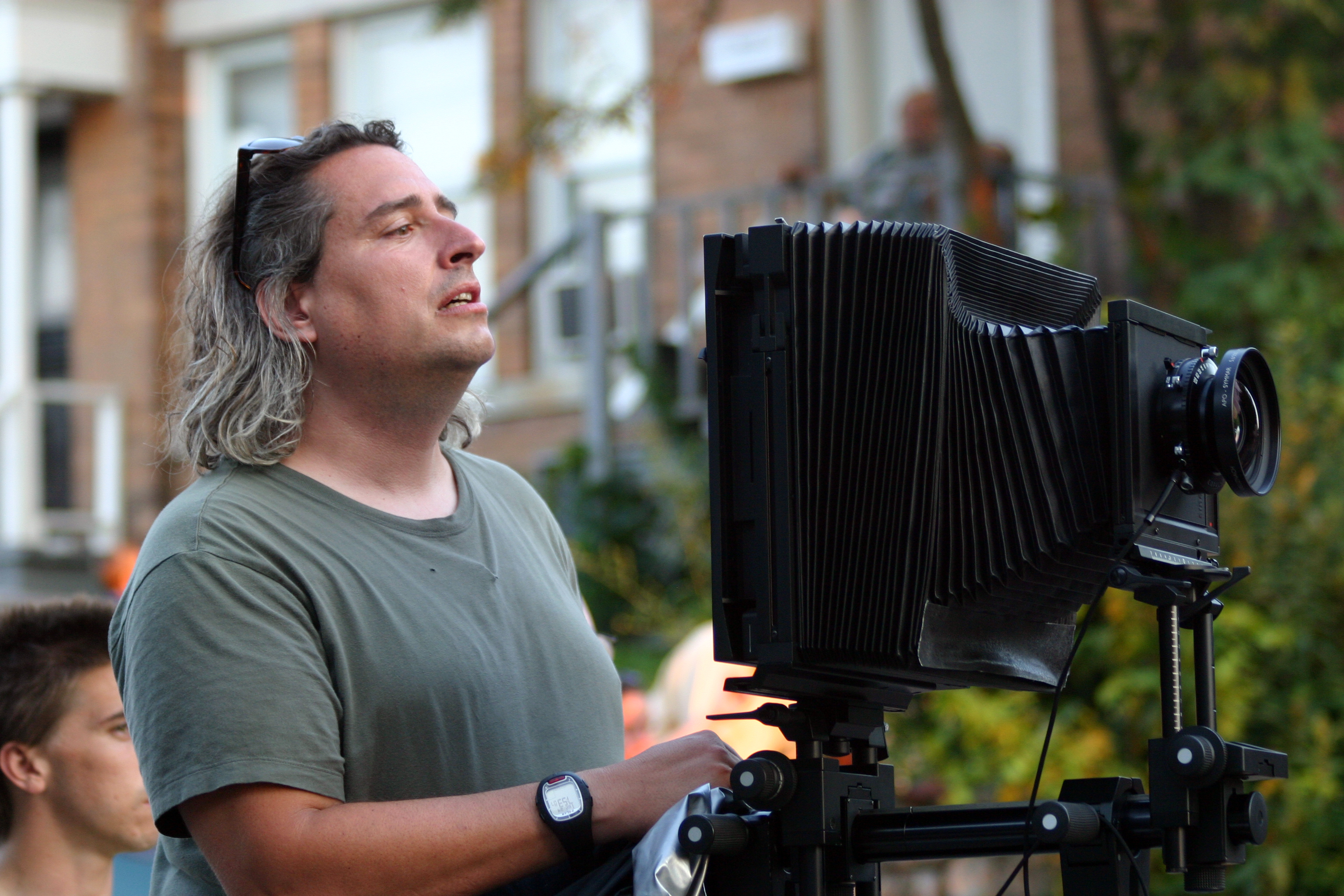
Photographer Gregory Crewdson with a large format camera in 2007

The 4×5 inch sheet film format was very convenient for press photography since it allowed for direct contact printing on the printing plate, hence it was widely used in press cameras. This was done well into the 1940s and 1950s, even with the advent of more convenient and compact medium format or 35 mm roll-film cameras which started to appear in the 1930s. The 35 mm and medium format SLR which appeared in the mid-1950s were soon adopted by press photographers.

Large format photography is not limited to film; large digital camera backs are available to fit large format cameras. These are either medium-format digital backs adapted to fit large format cameras (sometimes resulting in cropped images), step and repeat Multishot systems, or scanning backs (which scan the image area in the manner of a flat-bed scanner). Scanning backs can take seconds or even several minutes to capture an image. When using a Sinar Macroscan unit and 54H data files, over 1 gigabyte of data is produced.

Large format, both film-based and digital, is still used for many applications, such as landscape photography, advertising photos, fine-art photography, scientific applications and generally for images that will be enlarged to a high magnification while requiring a high level of detail. High quality fine art prints can be made at sizes in the range of 40x50″ from a 4×5″ original, and well beyond that for larger negatives.

In the printing industry, very large fixed cameras were also used to make large films for the preparation of lithographic plates before computer to film and computer to plate techniques were introduced. These are generally referred to as a "process camera" and consist of vertically mounted models for smaller work and horizontal units mounted on rails for very large works such as maps and plans.

=== National Park Service documentation programs ===
Large format film is also used to create a record of historic places and things for the National Park Service documentation programs. The Historic American Buildings Survey (HABS), the Historic American Engineering Record (HAER), and the Historic American Landscapes Survey (HALS) require large format film-based photography. 4×5″, 5×7″, and 8×10″ large format film formats are the only acceptable formats for inclusion in these collections at the Library of Congress. 4x5 and 5x7 are generally used in the field (5×7″ is preferred for very significant buildings) and 8×10″ is generally used for photo-duplication of historic photographs, documents and blueprints. Through HABS/HAER/HALS, buildings and sites of historic significance are recorded with large format cameras and black and white film and using techniques that document the key features of the historic resource with special care not to distort the angles and views. This rectified photography can be accomplished with large format cameras by keeping the film, lens and subject perfectly parallel. Smaller format cameras need to be tilted to view high or low subjects, but the same subjects can be captured by shifting the lens element of a large format camera up or down to keep the film, lens, and subject planes parallel.

HABS, HAER, and HALS also requires the increased resolution of large format film. A sheet of 5×7″ film has almost twice the area of 4×5″ film, and 4×5″ is about 15 times larger than a 35 mm film image (24×36 mm). This added negative size not only allows for more detail, but the large format polyester film is also far more durable than acetate 35 mm stock. HABS, HAER, and HALS require that all submissions to the Library of Congress include the original film (archivally washed) and it must also include contact prints on fiber-based paper; these contacts are the same size as the film being submitted, 4×5″, 5×7″, or 8×10″, and the large size allows people to readily see the prints, while 35 mm contacts would be too small and would require magnification. The programs' photography guidelines (2011, updated 2015) specify black-and-white film on a polyester base, as acetate film is to be avoided; digital contact prints made from scanned negatives are accepted if the paper, printer and ink combination has a permanence rating of at least 150 years, while resin-coated papers, and film or prints processed in automatic processors, are not accepted.

== See also ==
- APUG
- Large format lens
- Reisekamera (tailboard view camera)
- Wide-format printer (In digital printing, the term "large format" is also used as a synonym for "wide format".)
