= Photrio =

Photrio (formerly APUG) is a website and Internet forum for an international group of photographers who use analog photography. The website was founded in September 2002, and has attracted approximately 60,000 members, including paying subscribers. The group's website is maintained through users' donations, subscriptions, advertising revenue as well as corporate sponsorship.

The website's primary subject is analog photography that involves using film and darkroom techniques to produce negatives, slides or prints. Subjects discussed in the forums are concerned with aspects of traditional photography, including processes like cyanotype, platinum printing and other alternative processes. Each subject area has a forum.

The galleries have scanned photographic materials posted, which concern the methods and results of traditional processes. The website has an image gallery that encourages peer review.

The founder of APUG is Sean Ross from New Zealand.

== Events ==
In 2006 the first annual APUG conference was held in Toronto, Canada, sponsored in part by Ilford Photo.
